= 1952 in Australia =

- Monarch: George VI, then Elizabeth II
- Governor-General: William McKell
- Prime minister: Robert Menzies
- Population: 8,636,458
- Elections: VIC

The following lists events that happened during 1952 in Australia.

- Decades: 1930s; 1940s; 1950s; 1960s; 1970s
- See also: 1952 in Australian literature; Other events of 1952; Timeline of Australian history

== Incumbents ==
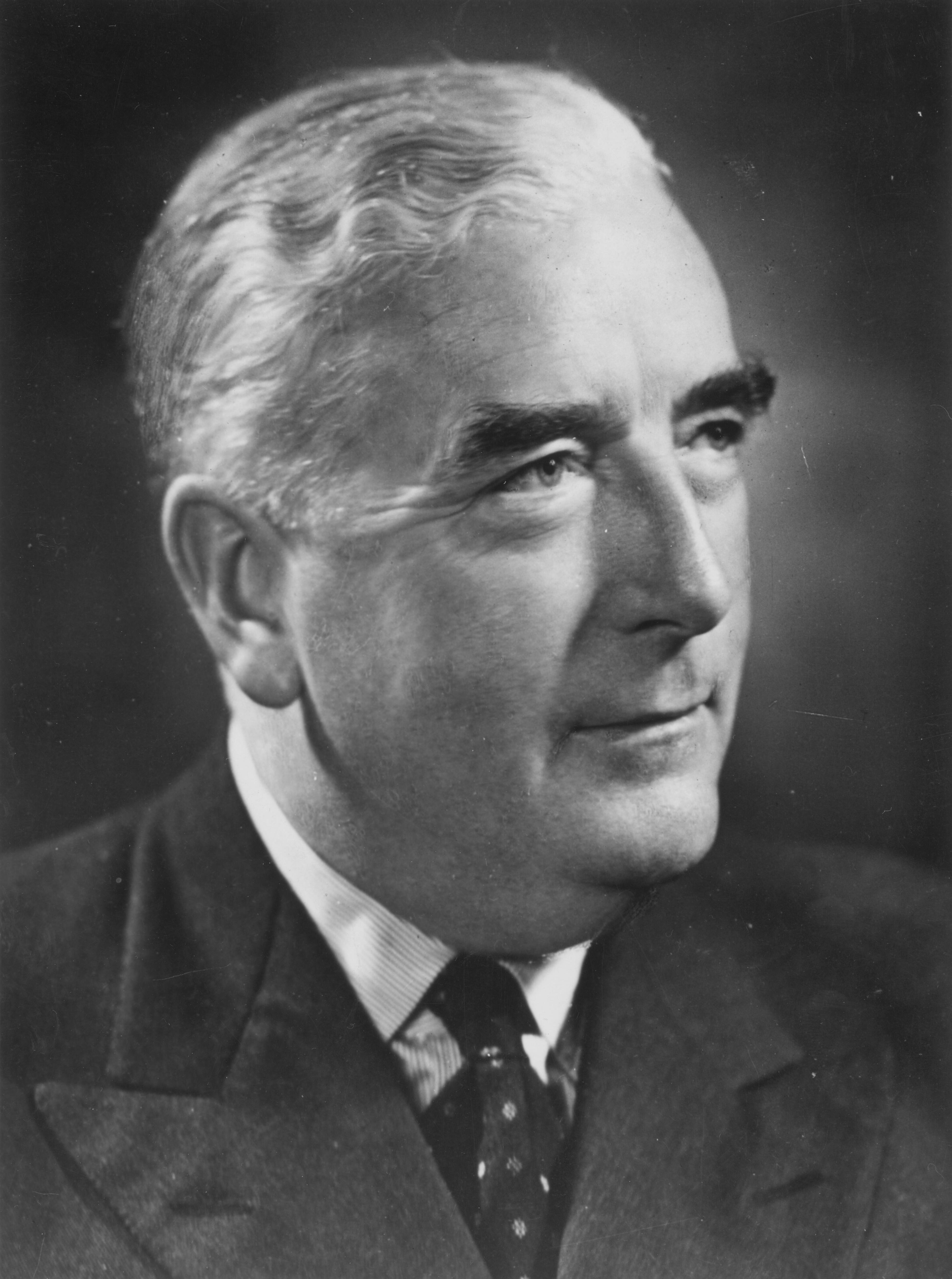
Robert Menzies

- Monarch – George VI (until 6 February), then Elizabeth II
- Governor-General – Sir William McKell
- Prime Minister – Robert Menzies
- Chief Justice – Sir John Latham (until 7 April) then Sir Owen Dixon

=== State Premiers ===
- Premier of New South Wales – James McGirr (until 2 April), then Joseph Cahill
- Premier of Queensland – Ned Hanlon (until 17 January), then Vince Gair
- Premier of South Australia – Thomas Playford IV
- Premier of Tasmania – Robert Cosgrove
- Premier of Victoria – John McDonald (until 28 October), then Thomas Hollway (until 31 October), then John McDonald (until 17 December), then John Cain I
- Premier of Western Australia – Ross McLarty

=== State Governors ===
- Governor of New South Wales – Sir John Northcott
- Governor of Queensland – Sir John Lavarack
- Governor of South Australia – Sir Charles Norrie (until 19 June)
- Governor of Tasmania – Sir Ronald Cross, 1st Baronet
- Governor of Victoria – Sir Dallas Brooks
- Governor of Western Australia – Sir Charles Gairdner

== Events ==
- 20 January – The first express trains run between Melbourne and Adelaide, following the completion of a railway between the two cities.
- 6 February – King George VI dies, and is succeeded as Queen of Australia by his daughter, Elizabeth II.
- 18 April – Owen Dixon becomes Chief Justice of the High Court of Australia.
- 29 April – The ANZUS Treaty between Australia, New Zealand and the United States comes into force.
- 14–18 June – Disastrous floods in the southeast corner leave 600 homeless and render a major rail line near Moss Vale unusable throughout the winter
  - The winter season is especially wet in the southeast of the continent, being the wettest on record in Melbourne and the fifth wettest on record in Sydney
- 1 September – Qantas Empire Airways commences the first air service between Australia and South Africa.
- 19 September – Betty Shanks is murdered in Brisbane. The case ultimately becomes Queensland's oldest unsolved murder.
- 28 October – Premier of Victoria John McDonald resigns after the Victorian Legislative Council refuses supply. Thomas Hollway forms a short-lived ministry which lasts four days.
- 30 November – Lang Hancock discovers the world's largest deposit of iron ore in the Hamersley Range of Western Australia's Pilbara region.
- 6 December – A state election is held in Victoria.

== Science and technology ==
- 3 October – The first British nuclear test in Australia, Operation Hurricane, commences on the Monte Bello Islands with the detonation of an atomic bomb of 25 kilotons yield.

== Arts and literature ==
- 28 April – Joan Sutherland makes her debut at Covent Garden
- William Dargie wins the Archibald Prize with his portrait of Essington Lewis
- Frank Hinder wins the Blake Prize for Religious Art with his work Flight into Egypt

== Sport ==
- Athletics
  - 16 February – Robert Prentice wins his second men's national marathon title, clocking 3:19:26 in Melbourne.
  - Olympics: Marjorie Jackson wins gold medals in the Women's 100m and 200m
  - Olympics: Shirley Strickland wins the gold medal in the 80m Hurdles
- Cricket
  - New South Wales wins the Sheffield Shield
- Cycling
  - Olympics: Russell Mockridge wins the gold medal in the Men's 1000m Time Trial
  - Olympics: Lionel Cox and Russell Mockridge win the gold medal in the Men's 2000m tandem
- Football
  - 14 and 16 June – for the only time in its history, the VFL plays matches for premiership points in country centres. Three other games are the first played interstate for premiership points since 1904 but flooding rains affect attendances and cause one game to be postponed and played under lights.
  - Victorian Football League premiership: Geelong defeated Collingwood 86-40
  - South Australian National Football League premiership: won by North Adelaide
- Rugby
  - Bledisloe Cup: retained by the All Blacks
  - Brisbane Rugby League premiership: Wests defeated Brothers 15-14
  - New South Wales Rugby League premiership: Wests defeated South Sydney 22-12
- Golf
  - Australian Open: won by Norman Von Nida
  - Australian PGA Championship: won by William C Holder
- Horse racing
  - Peshawar wins the Caulfield Cup
  - Hydrogen wins the Cox Plate
  - Dalray wins the Melbourne Cup
- Motor racing
  - The Australian Grand Prix was held at Bathurst and won by Doug Whiteford driving a Talbot-Lago
- Swimming
  - Olympics: John Davies wins the gold medal in the Men's 200m breaststroke
- Tennis
  - Australian Open men's singles: Ken McGregor defeats Frank Sedgman 7-5 12-10 2–6 6-2
  - Australian Open women's singles: Thelma Coyne Long defeats Helen Angwin 6-2 6-3
  - Davis Cup: Australia defeats the United States 4–1 in the 1952 Davis Cup final
  - Wimbledon: Ken McGregor and Frank Sedgman win the Men's Doubles
  - Wimbledon: Frank Sedgman wins the Men's Singles
- Yachting
  - Nocturne takes line honours and Ingrid wins on handicap in the Sydney to Hobart Yacht Race

== Births ==
- 2 January – Graeme Strachan (died 2001), singer
- 20 January – Patrick Smith (died 2023), sports journalist
- 26 January – Bethany Lee (died 2003), actress
- 6 February – Ric Charlesworth, sportsman
- 1 March – Leigh Matthews, Australian Rules football player and coach
- 6 March – Ian Cooke, field hockey player
- 2 May
  - Chris Anderson, rugby league footballer and coach
  - Campbell McComas (died 2005), impersonator and broadcaster
- 6 June – Ross Stretton (died 2005), ballet dancer
- 11 June – Tony Barnett, basketball player
- 15 June – Clare Martin, Chief Minister of the Northern Territory
- 25 June – Peter Farmer, hammer thrower
- 28 June – Ken Gillespie, Vice Chief of the Defence Force (2005–2008), Chief of Army (2008–2011)
- 28 July – Glenn A. Baker (died 2026), music historian
- 5 August – John Jarratt, actor
- 7 October – Graham Yallop, cricketer
- 2 September – Pru Goward, politician
- 4 September – Tom Maher, basketball coach
- 12 October – Trevor Chappell, cricketer
- 22 October – John Howard (Australian actor), stage and screen actor
- 18 November – Peter Beattie, Premier of Queensland
- 18 December – Frank Holden, entertainer
- 19 December – Andrew Fraser, politician

== Deaths ==
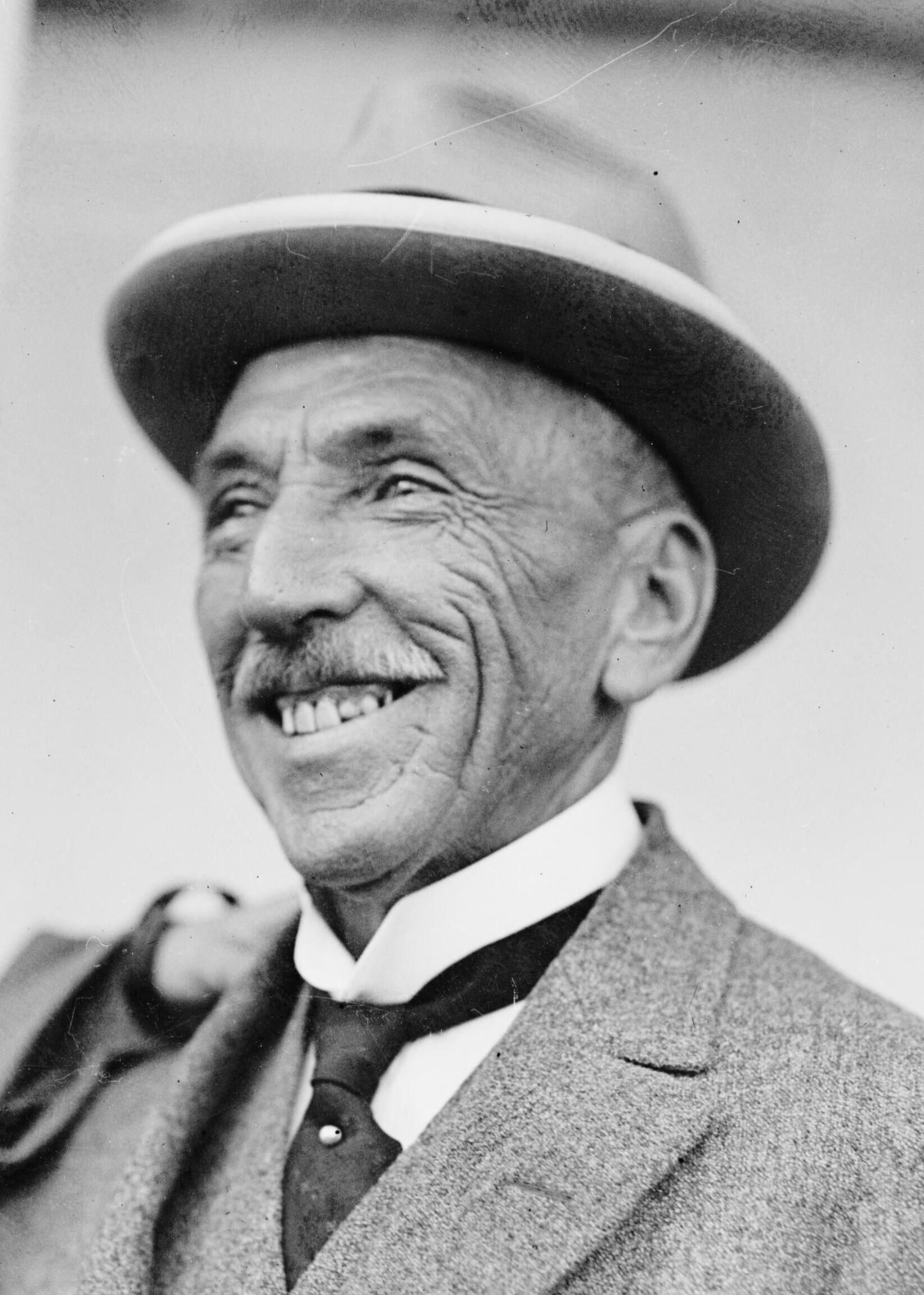
Billy Hughes

- 26 March – J.P. McGowan, actor and director (b. 1880)
- 28 March– Rose Hanigan, Australian Sister of Mercy, hospital founder and administrator (b. 1864)
- 12 June – Sir Harry Lawson, 27th Premier of Victoria (b. 1875)
- 24 June – Sir George Pearce, Western Australian politician (b. 1870)
- 22 July – James Vinton Smith, Victorian politician (b. 1897)
- 27 July – Roland Pope, cricketer, ophthalmologist and philanthropist (b. 1864)
- 6 August – Betty Allan, statistician and biometrician (b. 1905)
- 14 September – Sir John McPhee, 27th Premier of Tasmania (b. 1878)
- 4 October – Sir Keith Murdoch, journalist, businessman and news proprietor (b. 1885)
- 12 October – Madge Connor, police officer (born in Ireland) (b. 1874)
- 28 October – Billy Hughes, 7th Prime Minister of Australia (born in the United Kingdom) (b. 1862)
- 30 November – Elizabeth Kenny, nurse (b. 1880)
- 14 December – Colin William Wright, cattle breeder, grazier, local government councillor and local government head (b. 1867)

== See also ==
- List of Australian films of the 1950s
