= 1955 in Australia =

- Monarch: Elizabeth II
- Governor-General: William Slim
- Prime minister: Robert Menzies
- Population: 9,199,729
- Elections: Federal, TAS, VIC

The following lists events that happened during 1955 in Australia.

- Decades: 1930s; 1940s; 1950s; 1960s; 1970s
- See also: 1955 in Australian literature; Other events of 1955; Federal election; Timeline of Australian history

== Incumbents ==
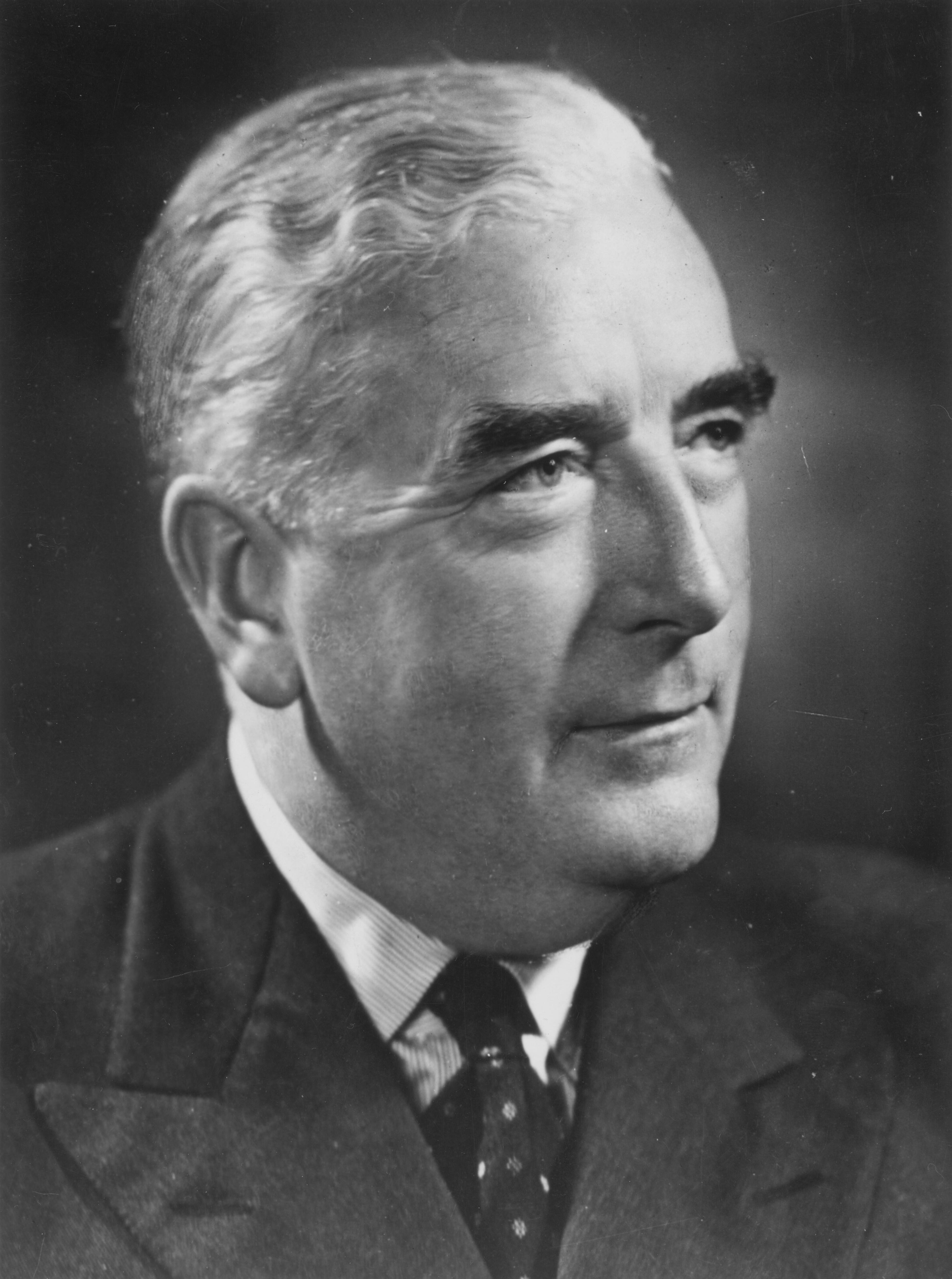
Robert Menzies

- Monarch – Elizabeth II
- Governor-General – Sir William Slim
- Prime Minister – Robert Menzies
- Chief Justice – Sir Owen Dixon

=== State Premiers ===
- Premier of New South Wales – Joseph Cahill
- Premier of Queensland – Vince Gair
- Premier of South Australia – Thomas Playford IV
- Premier of Tasmania – Robert Cosgrove
- Premier of Victoria – John Cain I (until 7 June), then Henry Bolte
- Premier of Western Australia – Albert Hawke

=== State Governors ===
- Governor of New South Wales – Sir John Northcott
- Governor of Queensland – Sir John Lavarack
- Governor of South Australia – Sir Robert George
- Governor of Tasmania – Sir Ronald Cross, 1st Baronet
- Governor of Victoria – Sir Dallas Brooks
- Governor of Western Australia – Sir Charles Gairdner

== Events ==
=== January ===
- 1 January – A cyclone hits Roebourne, Western Australia causing extensive damage.
- 2 January –
  - Bushfires burn through the Mount Lofty Ranges in South Australia destroying many properties, including the vice-regal summer residence of South Australian governor Sir Robert George.
  - Bushfires burn through Victoria, destroying properties and stock with towns in the far west of the state such as Dergholm, Casterton, Tarrenlea and Merino suffering the worst losses.
  - About 100 protestors from the Australian League for a Non-Divided Ireland gather at Melbourne's Spencer Street railway station awaiting the arrival of Prime Minister of Northern Ireland Lord Brookeborough from Adelaide on The Overland.
  - A 34-year-old man, a 12-year-old-boy and an 8-year-old boy drown in three separate incidents at Palm Beach, Cowan Creek and Lane Cove River.
- 3 January –
  - A tidal wave reportedly occurs at Nubeena, Tasmania flooding roads, causing dinghies to be torn from their moorings and vessels to be swept into the bay.
  - As New South Wales experiences a severe heatwave, water consumption in Sydney reaches a record high with some residents unable to access water as service reservoirs struggle to keep up with demand.
- 4 January –
  - Three people are killed when a light plane crashes into a mountainside near Yarra Glen, 15 minutes after taking off from Moorabbin Airport enroute to Canberra. Those killed were the 26-year-old pilot, a 25-year-old CSIRO typist and a 22-year-old first year diplomatic cadet with the Department of External Affairs.
  - A family is killed when their car collides with a semi-trailer on the Hume Highway near Wagga Wagga.
  - Lieutenant-General Sir Iven Mackay and his wife are injured in a car accident near Gosford.
- 7 January – Women's Royal Australian Naval Service director Blair Bowden arrives in Sydney on her last official visit ahead of her final day of service on 14 January 1955.
- 14 January – A 19-year-old National Service trainee is killed when his Tiger Moth aircraft crashes after colliding with another 3000 feet above Werribee.
- 31 January – Six people are killed and 16 others injured when a truck carrying two families consisting of 22 people plunged into a ravine after it lost control down the Toowoomba Range. A 40-year-old man and three of his children aged 11, 3 and 18 months were all killed in the accident along with another man, aged 45, and one of his children - a 15-year-old daughter.

=== February ===
- 1 February –
  - For the first time since 1916, hotel bars in New South Wales are permitted to stay open until 10pm marking the end of early closing hours in the state.
  - Chairman of the New South Wales milk board John Ferguson announces that all pasteurised milk supplied to residents of Sydney, Newcastle and Wollongong will be in milk bottles from 8 February as the delivery of bulk milk is completely phased out.
- 19 February – The Southeast Asia Treaty Organization (SEATO) is established at a meeting in Bangkok.
- 22–28 February – 1955 Hunter Valley floods: Enormous flooding of the Hunter River and adjacent areas of the Murray–Darling basin causes loss of life and set many rainfall and streamflow records.

=== March ===
- 14 March – A 40-year-old woman and a 2-year-old son are killed, and a rail motor derailed when the woman's car collided with the train at a level crossing at Molong on the Great Western Highway near Dubbo.

=== April ===
- 19 April – Australian Labor Party split of 1955. Expelled members form the Australian Labor Party (Anti-Communist), predecessor of the Democratic Labor Party (DLP).

=== May ===
- 28 May – A state election is held in Victoria. John Cain's Labor government is defeated by the Liberal and Country Party, led by Henry Bolte.

=== June ===
- 19 June – Minister for Trade and Customs, Senator O'Sullivan confirms the federal government has abandoned with control of tea with merchants now free to resume private trading of tea making their own arrangements with tea producing countries.

=== July ===
- A 5,500-ton freighter carrying 7,800 tons of coal is run onto a reef in Port Phillip Bay to prevent it from sinking after it struck rocks while traversing The Rip.

=== August ===
- August – Widespread floods and exceedingly persistent rainfall effect the southern fringe of the continent.
- 9 August – Margaret Telfer becomes the first woman to be appointed as a registrar of any Australian university when University of Sydney vice chancellor Stephen Henry Roberts announces her appointment.
- 12 August – The aircraft carrier HMAS Vengeance is returned to the British Royal Navy.
- 21 August – The Consolidated Zinc Corporation announced it has discovered bauxite at Weipa, Queensland.
- 22 August – The mayor of the Victorian town of Daylesford collapses and dies during a town hall meeting.

=== September ===
- 14 September – Attorney-General Senator John Spicer is sworn in as the Minister for Shipping and Transport following the death of Senator George McLeay.

=== October ===
- 28 October – The aircraft carrier HMAS Melbourne is commissioned into the Royal Australian Navy.

=== November ===
- 6 November – The 1955 Queensland Road Racing Championship is held at Southport.
- 16 November – The Adelaide suburb of Elizabeth, South Australia is established.
- 23 November – The Cocos Islands in the Indian Ocean are transferred from British to Australian control.

=== December ===
- 10 December – Federal election: The incumbent Liberal Party led by Prime Minister Robert Menzies with coalition partner the Country Party led by Arthur Fadden defeat the Labor Party led by H. V. Evatt. Malcolm Fraser first enters Parliament as Liberal member for Wannon.

== Science and technology ==
- The Guthega power station becomes the first to generate electricity in the Snowy Mountains Scheme

== Arts and literature ==
- 4 January – English humorist and writer Sir Alan Herbert arrives in Australia for a two-week stay.
- 6 January – American singer Nat King Cole arrives in Australia for a 10-day visit, during which he will perform in Sydney, Melbourne and Brisbane.
- 28 November – Ray Lawler's Summer of the Seventeenth Doll receives its stage premiere by the Union Theatre Repertory Company in Melbourne with the playwright in a leading role; this is influential as the first authentically naturalistic modern drama in the theatre of Australia
- 19 December – Dame Edna Everage makes her first stage appearance, in Melbourne
- John Brack paints The Car and Collins St., 5 pm in Oakleigh, Victoria
- Ivor Hele wins the Archibald Prize with his portrait of Robert Campbell Esq.
- Donald Friend wins the Blake Prize for Religious Art with his work St John and Scenes from the Apocalypse
- Patrick White's novel The Tree of Man is published
- Alan Marshall's childhood autobiography I Can Jump Puddles is published

== Film and television ==
- 3 January – Jedda, a film by Charles Chauvel premieres in Darwin.
- 5 January – A list of applicants vying for commercial television licences for Sydney and Melbourne is released by postmaster-general Hubert Lawrence Anthony. There are eight applicants competing for the two Sydney licences, while there are four applicants for the Melbourne licences. Among the applicants are federal opposition leader Doc Evatt and AWU general-secretary, Tom Dougherty who are applying for licences in both cities as "joint and provisional trustees of the Australian Workers Union and the Australian Labor Party".
- 7 January – Australian actor John McCallum returns to Australia for the first time in 8 years, bringing his wife Googie Withers with him. After their arrival in Australia, McCallum confirms he plans to make a film in Australian within a few months.
- 1 February – As the Australian Broadcasting Control Board commences the hearing of applicants for the two available Sydney television licences, managing director of Amalgamated Television Services Clive Ogilvy tells the board that he could have television programs on the air within 18 months if their bid was successful.

== Sport and recreation ==
- Athletics
- 7 January – John Landy is presented with the ABC's Sportsman of the Year Award at a special ceremony at Sydney Town Hall.
- Board games
- 19 January – Australian debut of Scrabble
- Cricket
- 16 February – New South Wales retains the Sheffield Shield after winning the 1954-55 season.
- 3 March – England wins the 1954-55 Ashes series defeating Australia 3–1.
- Football
  - South Australian National Football League premiership: won by Port Adelaide
  - Victorian Football League premiership: Melbourne defeated Collingwood 64–36
- Rugby
  - Bledisloe Cup: won by the All Blacks
  - Brisbane Rugby League premiership: Valleys defeat Brothers 17–7
  - New South Wales Rugby League premiership: South Sydney defeat Newtown 12–11
- Golf
  - Australian Open: won by Bobby Locke
  - Australian PGA Championship: won by Ossie Pickworth
- Horse racing
  - Rising Fast wins the Caulfield Cup
  - Kingster wins the Cox Plate
  - Toparoa wins the Melbourne Cup
- Motor racing
  - 31 January – The 1955 South Pacific Championship for racing cars is held in Orange, New South Wales which is won by British driver Peter Whitehead in a Ferrari 500. Driver Ian Mountain and spectator James Young are killed when Mountain lost control of his Peugeot which crashed through a fence and into a group of spectators during a preliminary race. Prince Bira also withdraws from all events after his car suffers engine troubles in a preliminary race.
  - The Australian Grand Prix is held at Port Wakefield and won by Jack Brabham driving a Cooper Bristol
- Tennis
  - Australian Open men's singles: Ken Rosewall defeats Lew Hoad 9–7 6–4 6–4
  - Australian Open women's singles: Beryl Penrose Collier defeats Thelma Coyne Long 6–4 6–3
  - Davis Cup: Australia defeats the United States 5–0 in the 1955 Davis Cup final
  - Wimbledon: Rex Hartwig and Lew Hoad win the Gentlemen's Doubles
- Yachting
  - Even takes line honours and Moonbi wins on handicap in the Sydney to Hobart Yacht Race

== Births ==
- 1 January – Mario Andreacchio, film director
- 6 January – Graham Murray (died 2013), rugby league footballer and coach
- 13 January – Paul Kelly, rock musician
- 10 February – Greg Norman, golfer
- 4 March – Tim Costello, Baptist minister and CEO of World Vision
- 6 April - Ray Blacklock (died 2020), rugby league footballer
- 10 April - Mike Rinder (died 2025), scientologist
- 23 April – Judy Davis, actress
- 2 May – Ian Callen, cricketer
- 3 May – David Hookes (died 2004), cricketer
- 31 May – Tommy Emmanuel, guitarist
- 23 June – Alan J. Gow, motorsport executive
- 5 July – Peter McNamara (died 2019), tennis player
- 24 July – David Smith, race walker
- 26 July – Ron Peno (died 2023), rock singer/songwriter
- 27 July – Allan Border, cricketer
- 5 August – Robert Flower (died 2014), footballer
- 19 August – Mary-Anne Fahey, actress and comedian
- 18 September - Jim Saleam, far right activist
- 5 October – Wilbur Wilde, saxophonist
- 8 October – Paul Lennon, Premier of Tasmania
- 24 October – Katherine Knight, murderer
- 30 November – Deborra-Lee Furness, actress and producer
- 11 December – David Atkins, actor and dancer
- 19 December– Lincoln Hall (died 2012), mountain climber

== Deaths ==
- 1 January – Reginald Rudall, politician (b. 1885)
- 3 January – Katie Ardill Brice, doctor (b. 1886)
- 10 May – John Radecki, stained-glass artist (born in Poland) (b. 1865)
- 6 June – Max Meldrum, artist (born in the United Kingdom) (b. 1875)
- 19 July – Pattie Fotheringhame, journalist (b. 1853)
- 1 August – Charles Shaw, journalist and novelist (b. 1900)
- 8 August – Madge Elliott, actress (b. 1896) (died in the United States)
- 26 August – P.C. Anderson, golfer and educator (born in the United Kingdom) (b. 1871)
- 5 September – Haydn Bunton Sr., Australian rules footballer (Fitzroy) (b. 1911)
- 14 September – George McLeay, politician (b. 1892)
- 11 November – Harry Cobby, military aviator (b. 1894)
- 19 December – Sir Keith Smith, aviator (b. 1890)

== See also ==
- List of Australian films of the 1950s
