= 1953 in Australia =

- Monarch: Elizabeth II
- Governor-General: William McKell, then William Slim
- Prime minister: Robert Menzies
- Population: 8,815,362
- Elections: Senate, WA, NSW, SA, QLD

The following lists events that happened during 1953 in Australia.

- Decades: 1930s; 1940s; 1950s; 1960s; 1970s
- See also: 1953 in Australian literature; Other events of 1953; Federal election; Timeline of Australian history

== Incumbents ==
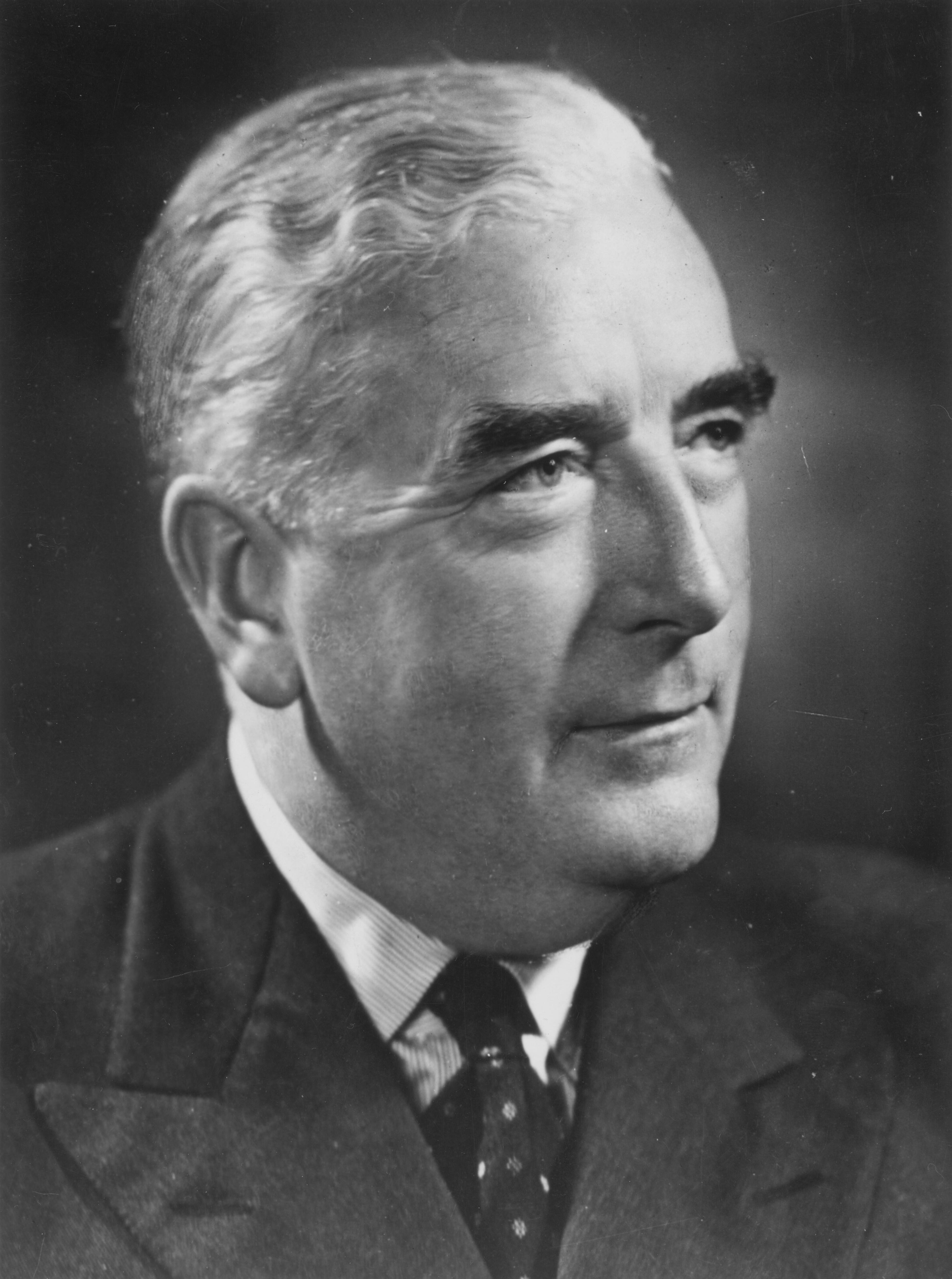
Robert Menzies

- Monarch – Elizabeth II
- Governor-General – William McKell (until 8 May), then Sir William Slim
- Prime Minister – Robert Menzies
- Chief Justice – Sir Owen Dixon

=== State Premiers ===
- Premier of New South Wales – Joseph Cahill
- Premier of Queensland – Vince Gair
- Premier of South Australia – Thomas Playford IV
- Premier of Tasmania – Robert Cosgrove
- Premier of Victoria – John Cain I
- Premier of Western Australia – Ross McLarty (until 23 February), then Albert Hawke

=== State Governors ===
- Governor of New South Wales – Sir John Northcott
- Governor of Queensland – Sir John Lavarack
- Governor of South Australia – Sir Robert George (from 23 February)
- Governor of Tasmania – Sir Ronald Cross, 1st Baronet
- Governor of Victoria – Sir Dallas Brooks
- Governor of Western Australia – Sir Charles Gairdner

== Events ==
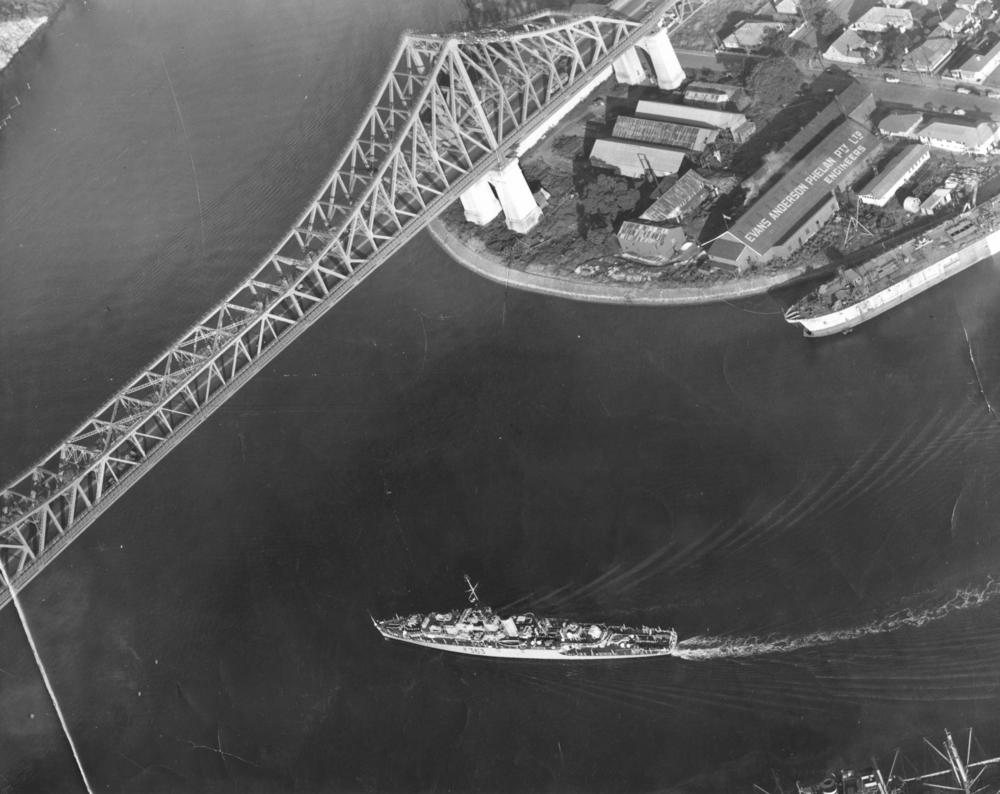
Aerial view of the Story Bridge, 1953

- 20 March – The Television Act is passed by parliament, setting regulations for the broadcast of television in Australia, although television transmission did not commence until 1956.
- 2 June – Elizabeth II's coronation as Queen of Australia takes place at Westminster Abbey
- 29 October – British Commonwealth Pacific Airlines Douglas DC-6, registration VH-BPE, en route from Sydney, crashes on approach to San Francisco, killing 19 people.
- 4 December – Oil is discovered in the Exmouth Gulf off the coast of Western Australia.

== Science and technology ==
The first town to fluoridate the water supply in Australia was Beaconsfield, Tasmania.

== Arts and literature ==
- John Brack paints Men's Wear and The New House in Oakleigh, Victoria
- Ivor Hele wins the Archibald Prize with his portrait of Sir Henry Simpson Newland
- Michael Kmit wins the Blake Prize for Religious Art with his work The Evangelist John Mark

== Sport ==
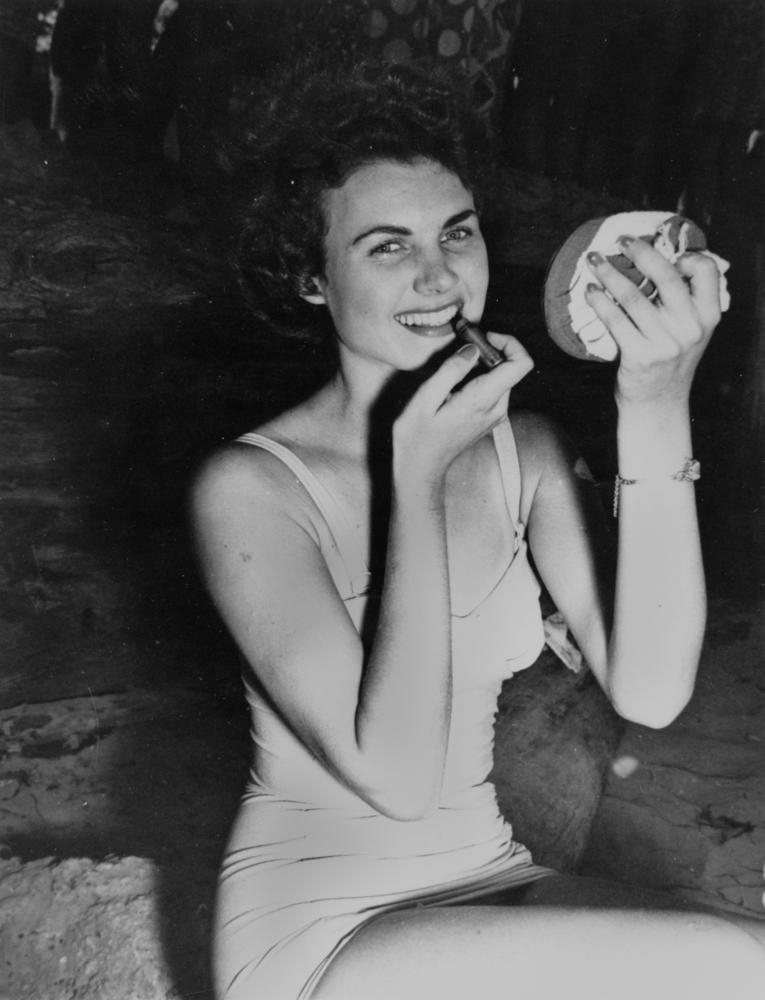
Winner of the Sun Girl Quest at Suttons Beach, 1953

- Athletics
  - 26 September – Roland Guy wins the men's national marathon title, clocking 2:24:48 in Sydney.
- Cricket
  - South Australia wins the Sheffield Shield
- Football
  - 23 May: Fitzroy go within ten minutes of a team score of 0.0 (0), which would have been a VFL first, against Footscray in appalling conditions. Allan Ruthven kicks a late goal to save them from this ignominy.
  - 1 August: Collingwood end Geelong's record 26-game unbeaten streak, which still stand, when they win 10.15 (75) to 7.13 (55).
  - South Australian National Football League premiership: won by West Torrens
  - Victorian Football League premiership: Collingwood defeated Geelong 77–65
- Rugby league
  - Brisbane Rugby League premiership: Souths defeated Easts 21–4
  - 1953 NSWRFL season ends with South Sydney defeating St. George 31–12 in the Grand Final
  - 1953 American All Stars tour of Australia and New Zealand takes place with the Americans playing matches hosted by various Australian teams including the New South Wales Blues and Queensland Maroons.
- Golf
  - Australian Open: won by Norman Von Nida
  - Australian PGA Championship: won by Ossie Pickworth
- Horse racing
  - My Hero wins the Caulfield Cup
  - Hydrogen wins the Cox Plate
  - Wodalla wins the Melbourne Cup
- Motor racing
  - The Australian Grand Prix was held at Albert Park and won by Doug Whiteford driving a Talbot-Lago
- Tennis
  - Australian Open men's singles: Ken Rosewall defeats Mervyn Rose 6–0 6–3 6–4
  - Australian Open women's singles: Maureen Connolly defeats Julie Sampson Haywood 6–3 6–2
  - Davis Cup: Australia defeats the United States 3–2 in the 1953 Davis Cup final
  - Wimbledon: Lew Hoad and Ken Rosewall win the Men's Doubles
- Yachting
  - Solveig IV takes line honours and Ripple wins on handicap in the Sydney to Hobart Yacht Race

== Births ==
- 16 January – Vic Aanensen, Australian rules football player
- 4 February – Pam Allan, politician
- 5 February – Rod Jones, Australian novelist
- 14 February – Greg Browning, field hockey player
- 4 March
  - Scott Hicks, film director
  - Ray Price, rugby league footballer
- 7 March – Peter Webb, politician
- 15 March – Randall Goff, water polo player
- 17 March
  - Margaret Jackson, businesswoman
  - Mary-Louise McLaws, epidemiologist (died 2023)
- 12 April – Mike Munro, journalist
- 16 April – Peter Garrett, singer and politician
- 21 April
  - John Brumby, politician
  - Ron Hoenig, politician and barrister
- 30 April – Craig Baumann, politician
- 8 May
  - Linda Dessau, 29th Governor of Victoria (2015–2023)
  - Tony Doyle, politician (died 1994)
- 20 May – Robert Doyle, politician
- 16 June – Sandra Nori, politician
- 24 June – Michael Tuck, Australian Rules football player
- 1 July
  - David Gulpilil, actor (died 2021)
  - Allan Shearan, politician
- 5 July – David Morrow, sports commentator (died 2024)
- 13 July – Andrew Tink, politician
- 21 July – Jeff Fatt, musician (The Cockroaches and The Wiggles)
- 23 July – Geoff Corrigan, politician
- 27 July – Yahoo Serious, filmmaker
- 17 August – Noni Hazlehurst, actress
- 26 August – General David Hurley, AC, DSC, Chief of the Defence Force (2011–2014)
- 9 September – Janet Fielding, actress
- 11 September – Renée Geyer, singer (died 2023)
- 27 September – Greg Ham, musician (Men at Work) (died 2012)
- 13 November – Bob Brett, tennis coach (died 2021)
- 25 November – Graham Eadie, rugby league footballer
- 12 December – Martin Ferguson, politician

== Deaths ==
- 7 January – Frank Bottrill, blacksmith and inventor of a variant of the dreadnaught wheel (b. 1871)
- 28 January – James Scullin, 9th Prime Minister of Australia (b. 1876)
- 12 February – Sir Hal Colebatch, 12th Premier of Western Australia (born in the United Kingdom) (b. 1872)
- 18 February – Denis Lutge, rugby league and union footballer (b. 1879)
- 6 March – Stephen Moreno, composer (born in Spain and died in France) (b. 1889)
- 2 May – Trevor Oldham, 13th Deputy Premier of Victoria (died in India) (b. 1900)
- 22 May – Louis Lavater, composer (b. 1867)
- 25 August – Jessie Aspinall, doctor, first female junior medical resident at the Royal Prince Alfred Hospital (b. 1880)
- 1 September – Bernard O'Dowd, journalist, author, and poet (b. 1866)
- 2 December – Reginald Baker, athlete, sports promoter and film actor (died in the United States) (b. 1884)
- 20 December – King O'Malley, Tasmanian politician (born in the United States) (b. 1858)

== See also ==
- List of Australian films of the 1950s
