= 1954 in Australia =

- Monarch: Elizabeth II
- Governor-General: William Slim
- Prime minister: Robert Menzies
- Population: 8,986,530
- Elections: Federal

The following lists events that happened during 1954 in Australia.

- Decades: 1930s; 1940s; 1950s; 1960s; 1970s
- See also: 1954 in Australian literature; Other events of 1954; Federal election; Timeline of Australian history

== Incumbents ==
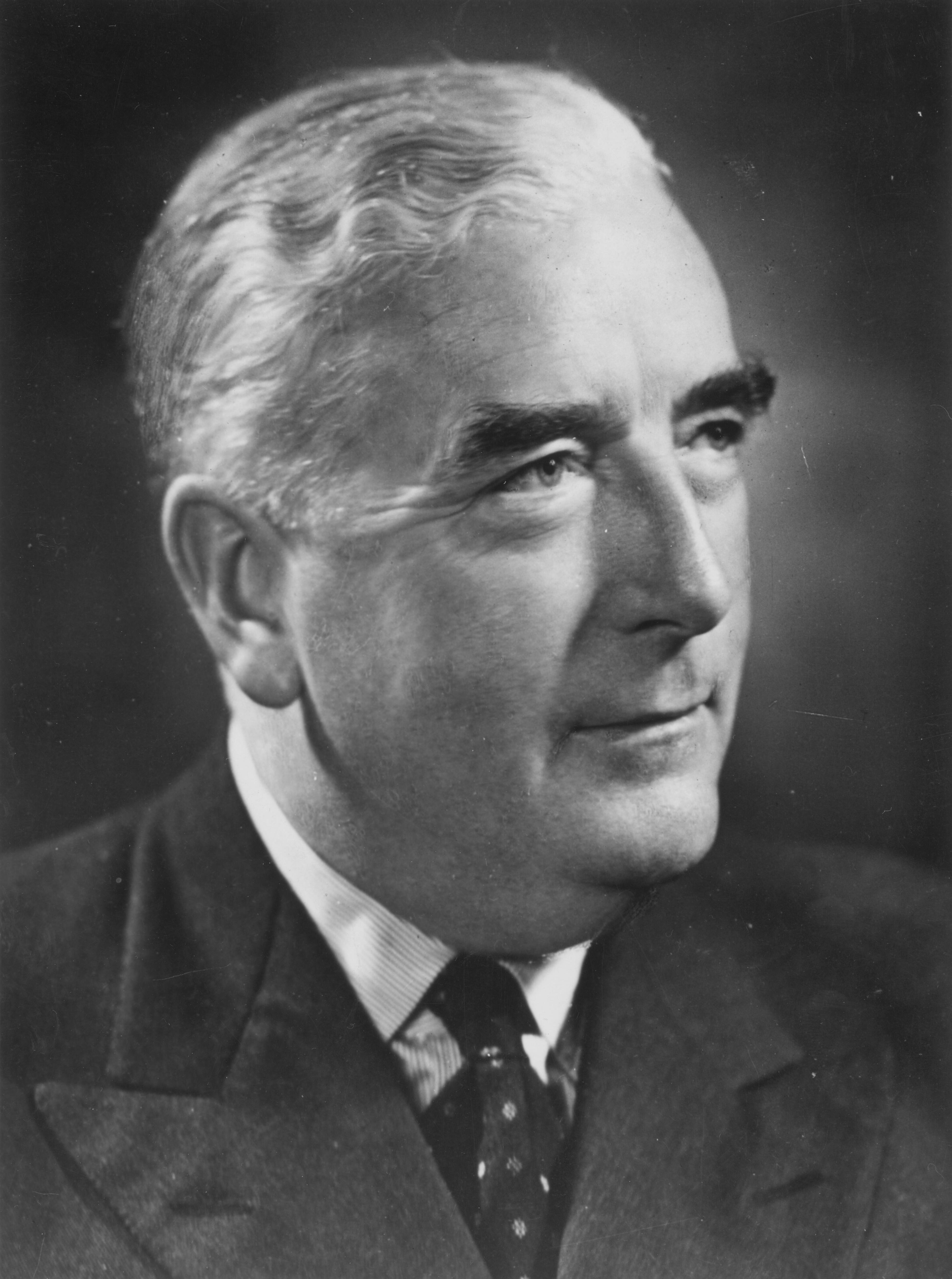
Robert Menzies

- Monarch – Elizabeth II
- Governor-General – Sir William Slim
- Prime Minister – Robert Menzies
- Chief Justice – Sir Owen Dixon

=== State Premiers ===
- Premier of New South Wales – Joseph Cahill
- Premier of Queensland – Vince Gair

=== State Governors ===
- Governor of New South Wales – Sir John Northcott
- Governor of Queensland – Sir John Lavarack
- Governor of South Australia – Sir Robert George
- Governor of Tasmania – Sir Ronald Cross, 1st Baronet
- Governor of Western Australia – Sir Charles Gairdner

== Events ==
- 3 February – Elizabeth II arrives in Sydney on her first visit as monarch
- 13 February – Mawson Station in the Australian Antarctic Territory is established
- During February, a cyclone hits the Gold Coast and northern New South Wales, killing 26
- 1 March - Adelaide and large parts of southern South Australia are shaken by a 5.6 magnitude earthquake, resulting in the injuries of 16 people, and a damage bill of £17 million (2017: $578 million).
- 3 April – Vladimir Petrov, a Soviet diplomat, defects to Australia, sparking the Petrov Affair
- Shirley Bliss wins the Miss Australia Quest
- On 31 October, the first Vickers Viscount aircraft delivered to Australia crashed at Mangalore Airport while on a training flight only days after its arrival in Australia, killing 3 of the 7 people on board.

== Science and technology ==
- The Australian Academy of Science is established.

== Arts and literature ==
- Ivor Hele wins the Archibald Prize with his portrait of Rt Hon R G Menzies, PC, CH, QC, MP
- Charles Bannon wins the Blake Prize for Religious Art with his work Judas Iscariot
- Overland literary magazine is founded, edited by Stephen Murray-Smith

== Sport ==
- Cricket
  - New South Wales wins the Sheffield Shield
- Football
  - Brisbane Rugby League premiership: Wests defeated Brothers 35-18
  - New South Wales Rugby League premiership: South Sydney defeated Newtown 23-15
  - South Australian National Football League premiership: won by Port Adelaide
  - Victorian Football League premiership: Footscray defeated Melbourne 102-51
- Golf
  - Australian Open: won by Ossie Pickworth
  - Australian PGA Championship: won by Kel Nagle
- Horse racing
  - Rising Fast wins the Caulfield Cup
  - Rising Fast wins the Cox Plate
  - Rising Fast wins the Melbourne Cup
- Motor racing
  - The Australian Grand Prix was held at Southport and won by Lex Davison driving a HWM Jaguar
- Tennis
  - Australian Open men's singles: Mervyn Rose defeats Rex Hartwig 6-2 0–6 6-4 6-2
  - Australian Open women's singles: Thelma Coyne Long defeats Jenny Staley Hoad 6-3 6-4
  - Davis Cup: Australia is defeated by the United States 2–3 in the 1954 Davis Cup final
  - Wimbledon: Rex Hartwig and Mervyn Rose win the Gentlemen's Pairs
  - Wimbledon: Jaroslav Drobný defeats Ken Rosewall 13–11 4–6 6–2 9–7 in the Gentlemen's Singles
- Yachting
  - Kurrewa IV takes line honours and Solveig IV wins on handicap in the Sydney to Hobart Yacht Race

== Births ==
- 10 January – Greg Towns, footballer
- 25 January – Kay Cottee, sailor
- 26 January – Kim Hughes, cricketer
- 26 March - Clive Palmer, businessman and politician
- 27 April – Mark Holden, singer and media personality
- 1 May – Garry Who, actor and comedian
- 2 May – Don Cameron, water polo player and coach
- 19 May – Phil Rudd, musician
- 27 May – Pauline Hanson, politician
- 17 June – Kerry Greenwood, novelist and lawyer (died 2025)
- 30 June – Wayne Swan, Deputy Prime Minister of Australia
- 2 July – Scott W. Sloan, professor of civil engineering (died 2019)
- 11 July – Paul Blackwell, actor (died 2019)
- 11 August – Wally Carr, boxer (died 2019)
- 12 August – Rob Borbidge, Premier of Queensland
- 2 September – Gai Waterhouse, horse trainer
- 13 September – Steve Kilbey, musician
- 20 September – James Moloney, author
- 27 September – Ray Hadley, 2GB radio announcer
- 13 October – Banduk Marika, Indigenous artist and printmaker (died 2021)
- 15 October – Steve Bracks, 44th Premier of Victoria
- 24 October – Malcolm Turnbull, 29th Prime Minister of Australia
- 12 November – Paul McNamee, tennis player
- 22 November – Carol Tomcala, sports shooter
- 26 November – Jacki MacDonald, media personality
- 29 November – Steve Rogers (died 2006), Rugby league footballer

== Deaths ==
- 10 January – Chester Wilmot, war correspondent (b. 1911)
- 19 September – Miles Franklin, writer and feminist (b. 1879)
- 14 November – Inigo Owen Jones, meteorologist and farmer (born in the United Kingdom) (b. 1872)
- 22 November – Roy Rene, comedian (b. 1891)

== See also ==
- List of Australian films of the 1950s
