= 1957 in Australia =

- Governor-General: William Slim
- Prime minister: Robert Menzies
- Population: 9,640,138
- Elections: QLD

The following lists events that happened during 1957 in Australia.

- Decades: 1930s; 1940s; 1950s; 1960s; 1970s
- See also: 1957 in Australian television; 1957 in Australian literature; Other events of 1957; Timeline of Australian history

== Incumbents ==
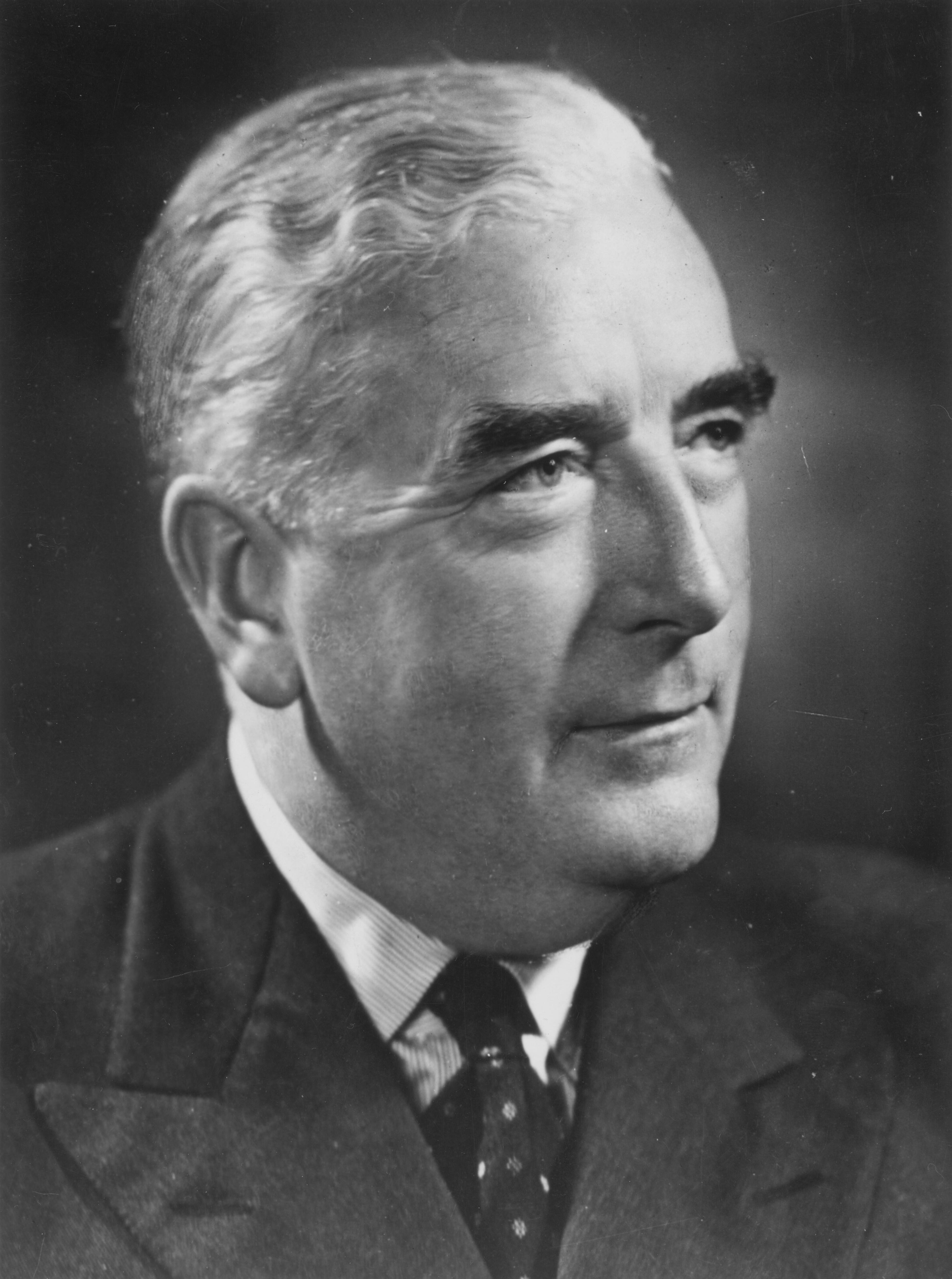
Robert Menzies

- Monarch – Elizabeth II
- Governor-General – Sir William Slim
- Prime Minister – Robert Menzies
- Chief Justice – Sir Owen Dixon

=== State Premiers ===
- Premier of New South Wales – Joseph Cahill
- Premier of South Australia – Thomas Playford IV
- Premier of Queensland – Vince Gair (until 12 August), then Frank Nicklin
- Premier of Tasmania – Robert Cosgrove
- Premier of Western Australia – Albert Hawke
- Premier of Victoria – Henry Bolte

=== State Governors ===
- Governor of New South Wales – Sir John Northcott (until 3 July), then Sir Eric Woodward (from 1 August)
- Governor of Queensland – Sir John Lavarack (until 4 December)
- Governor of South Australia – Sir Robert George
- Governor of Tasmania – Sir Ronald Cross, 1st Baronet
- Governor of Victoria – Sir Dallas Brooks
- Governor of Western Australia – Sir Charles Gairdner

== Events ==
- 19 January – The last edition of The Argus newspaper is published.
- 29 July – The Bega bombing occurs in Bega, New South Wales when Senior Constable Kenneth Desmond Coussens (31), his wife Elizabeth (34) and 7-month-old son Bruce are instantly killed by a bomb placed on their home's veranda. The house was demolished by the explosion at about 2 AM. 8-year-old Roger McCampbell, Coussens step-son, survived. A six-gallon metal cream container filled with 240 sticks of gelignite, stolen from a mine, was placed there by Myron Bertram Kelly. Coussens dealt with Kelly regarding traffic offences and issued him several traffic fines. Kelly appears to have become angered because Coussens issued further fines and defect notices regarding Kelly's tractor and rotary hoe. On 6 December 1957 Justice McClemens sentenced Kelly to life imprisonment for the 3 murders.
- 27 August – The Democratic Labor Party DLP votes at its national conference to reject the White Australia policy. Becoming the largest party in Australia to oppose the policy at that time.
- 15 September – Hobart has its wettest day on record with 156.2 millimetres as a result of a slow-moving low pressure system redeveloping over the Tasman Sea
- 3 October – Australian National Airways (ANA) is merged with Ansett to form Ansett-ANA.
- Slim Dusty wins his first gold record for A Pub With No Beer.

== Science and technology ==
The CSIRO develop radar and microwave navigation systems for aircraft.

== Arts and literature ==
- Architect Jørn Utzon wins the design competition for the Sydney Opera House
- Ivor Hele wins the Archibald Prize with his Self Portrait
- Elwynn Lynn wins the Blake Prize for Religious Art with his work Betrayal
- Voss by Patrick White wins the inaugural Miles Franklin Literary Award

== Film ==
- Robbery Under Arms, film adaptation of the novel of the same name.
- Three in One, a television show of three short stories about life in Australia in the 1950s.

== Television ==
- 19 January – GTV-9 television station is officially opened in Melbourne.
- 6 May – In Melbourne Tonight, TV-Series 1957–1970 (GTV-9's first major production).
- Pick-A-Box, TV-Series 1957–1971 (first broadcast as a radio program in 1948)
- The Tarax Show, TV-Series 1957–1970 (sponsored by Tarax, a soft drink bottling company from Melbourne.

== Sport ==
- Cricket
  - New South Wales wins the Sheffield Shield
- Football
  - South Australian National Football League premiership: won by Port Adelaide
  - Victorian Football League premiership: Melbourne defeated Essendon 116-55
- Rugby league
  - Brisbane Rugby League premiership: Valleys defeated Brothers 18-17
  - New South Wales Rugby League premiership: St. George defeated Manly-Warringah 31-9
  - Australia hosted and won the 1957 Rugby League World Cup tournament
- Rugby union
  - Bledisloe Cup: won by the All Blacks
- Golf
  - Australian Open: won by Frank Phillips
  - Australian PGA Championship: won by Gary Player
- Horse racing
  - Tulloch wins the Caulfield Cup
  - Red Craze wins the Cox Plate
  - Todman wins the inaugural Golden Slipper
  - Straight Draw wins the Melbourne Cup
- Motor racing
  - The Australian Grand Prix was held at Caversham and won by Lex Davison and Bill Patterson driving a Ferrari
- Tennis
  - Australian Open men's singles: Ashley Cooper defeats Neale Fraser 6-3 9-11 6-4 6-2
  - Australian Open women's singles: Shirley Fry defeats Althea Gibson 6–3 6–4
  - Davis Cup: Australia defeats the United States 3–2 in the 1957 Davis Cup final
  - Wimbledon: Lew Hoad wins the Men's Singles
- Yachting
  - Kurrewa IV takes line honours and Anitra V wins on handicap in the Sydney to Hobart Yacht Race

== Births ==
- 2 January – Destiny Deacon, photographer and artist (died 2024)
- 5 January – Kevin Hastings, rugby league player and trainer
- 27 February – Robert de Castella, marathon runner
- 20 March – David Foster, axeman
- 30 March – Debra Byrne, entertainer
- 30 March – Alan Fletcher, Australian actor
- 9 April – Jamie Redfern, singer
- 13 April – Mark Tonelli, swimmer
- 18 April – Ian Campbell, long and triple jumper
- 22 May – Gary Sweet, actor
- 13 July – Penny Cook, actress (died 2018)
- 26 July – Wayne Grady, golfer
- 14 August – Peter Costello, politician
- 16 August – Peter Van Miltenburg, track and field sprinter
- 21 September – Kevin Rudd, Prime Minister of Australia (2007–2010)
- 22 September – Nick Cave, musician
- 4 November – Tony Abbott, Prime Minister of Australia (2013–2015)
- 21 December – Tracy Mann, actress
- 30 December – Simon Madden, Australian Rules footballer

== Deaths ==
- 11 January – Sir Robert Garran (born 1867), Solicitor-General of Australia
- 31 January – John Marshall (born 1930), freestyle swimmer
- 4 August – John Cain I (born 1882), Premier of Victoria
- 27 October – James McGirr (born 1890), Premier of New South Wales

== See also ==
- List of Australian films of the 1950s
