= 1950 in Australia =

- Monarch: George VI
- Governor-General: William McKell
- Prime minister: Robert Menzies
- Population: 8,178,696
- Elections: NSW, VIC, QLD, WA, SA, TAS

The following lists events that happened during 1950 in Australia.

- Decades: 1930s; 1940s; 1950s; 1960s; 1970s
- See also: 1950 in Australian literature; Other events of 1950; Timeline of Australian history

== Incumbents ==
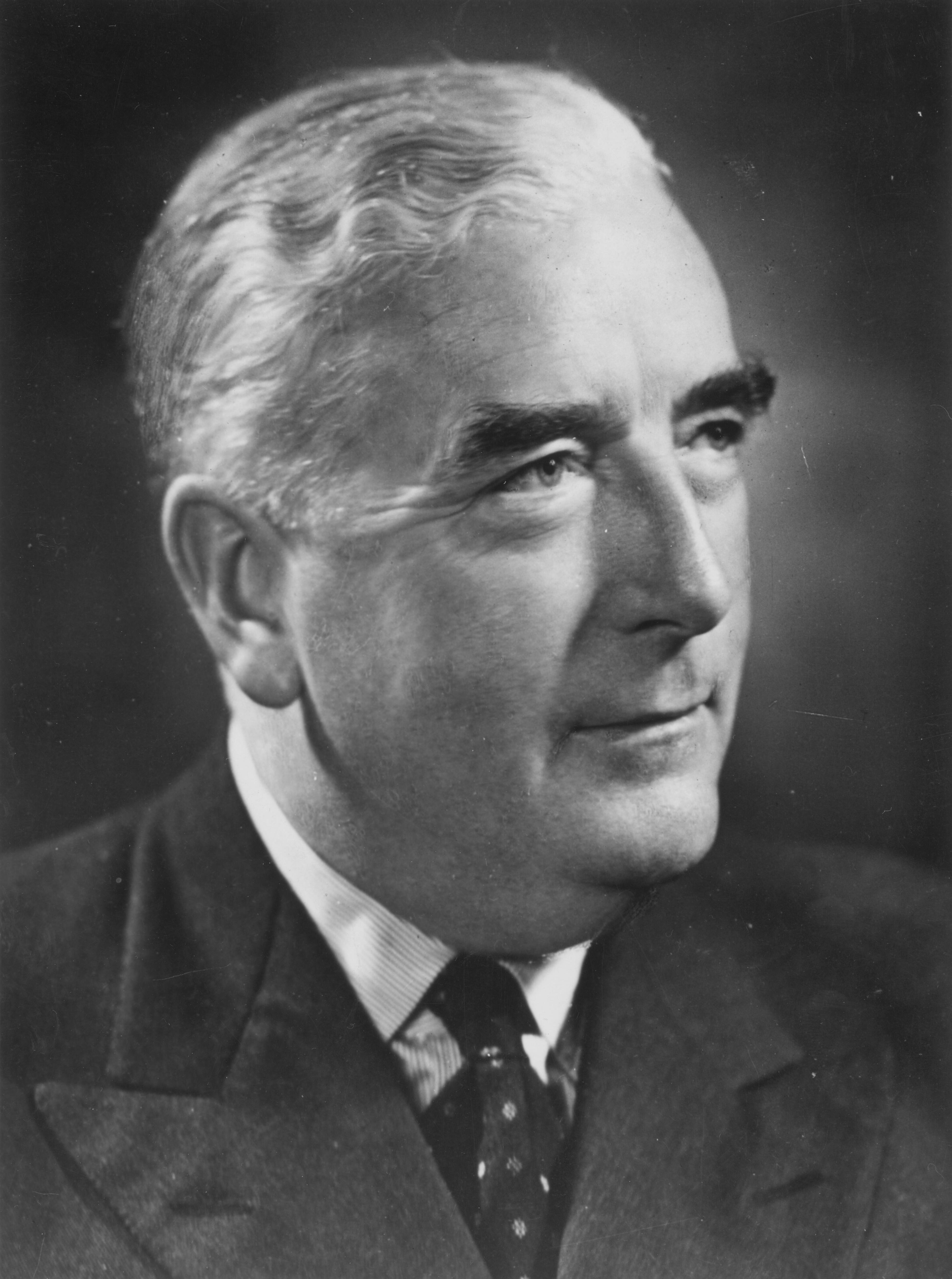
Robert Menzies

- Monarch – George VI
- Governor-General – William McKell
- Prime Minister – Robert Menzies
- Chief Justice – Sir John Latham

=== State Premiers ===
- Premier of New South Wales – James McGirr
- Premier of Queensland – Ned Hanlon
- Premier of South Australia – Thomas Playford IV
- Premier of Tasmania – Robert Cosgrove
- Premier of Victoria – Thomas Hollway (until 27 June), then John McDonald
- Premier of Western Australia – Ross McLarty

=== State Governors ===
- Governor of New South Wales – Sir John Northcott
- Governor of Queensland – Sir John Lavarack
- Governor of South Australia – Sir Charles Norrie
- Governor of Tasmania – Sir Hugh Binney
- Governor of Victoria – Sir Dallas Brooks
- Governor of Western Australia – Sir James Mitchell

== Events ==
- 25 January – The Tank Landing Ship HMAS Tarakan explodes at Garden Island in Sydney, killing 8 people.
- 8 February – Petrol rationing ends, nearly ten years after it was introduced during World War II.
- 6 May – A state election is held in Tasmania. The result is a hung parliament, but Robert Cosgrove's Labor Party remains in power with independent support.
- 13 May – A state election is held in Victoria.
- 23 June – The Parliament of Australia passes the Communist Party Dissolution Bill, effectively banning the operation of the Communist Party of Australia.
- 26 June – Douglas DC-4 Amana crashes near Perth, Western Australia, killing all 29 people on board.
- 26 July – The government announces that Australia will send troops to fight in the Korean War. The first Australian forces land in Korea on 17 September.
- 28 October – The Smith's Weekly newspaper, founded in 1919, is published for the last time.
- New South Wales and Queensland receive extraordinary annual rainfall.

== Arts and literature ==
- 11 December – A Town Like Alice by Nevil Shute is published.

=== Unknown dates ===
- William Dargie wins the Archibald Prize with his portrait of Sir Leslie McConnan
- The novel Power Without Glory by Frank Hardy is published.
- The Ballet Corroboree, by John Antill, is first performed

== Sport ==
- General
  - Australia wins 34 gold medals at the 4th British Empire Games, held in Auckland, New Zealand
- Cricket
  - New South Wales wins the Sheffield Shield
- Cycling
  - Sid Patterson wins the world amateur pursuit cycling title in Belgium
- Football
  - Brisbane Rugby League premiership: Easts defeated Wests 14-10
  - New South Wales Rugby League premiership: South Sydney defeated Western Suburbs 21-15
  - South Australian National Football League premiership: won by Norwood
  - Victorian Football League premiership: Essendon defeated North Melbourne 92-54
- Golf
  - Australian Open: won by Norman Von Nida
  - Australian PGA Championship: won by Norman Von Nida
- Horse racing
  - Grey Boots wins the Caulfield Cup
  - Alister wins the Cox Plate
  - Comic Court wins the Melbourne Cup
- Motor racing
  - The Australian Grand Prix was held at Nuriootpa and won by Doug Whiteford driving a Ford
- Tennis
  - Australian Open men's singles: Frank Sedgman defeats Ken McGregor 6-3 6-4 4-6 6-1
  - Australian Open women's singles: Louise Brough defeats Doris Hart 6-4 3-6 6-4
  - Davis Cup: Australia defeats the United States 4–1 in the 1950 Davis Cup final
  - US Open: John Bromwich and Frank Sedgman win the Men's Doubles
  - Wimbledon: John Bromwich and Adrian Quist win the Men's Doubles
- Yachting
  - Margaret Rintoul takes line honours and Nerida wins on handicap in the Sydney to Hobart Yacht Race

== Births ==
- 1 January – Wayne Bennett, rugby league footballer and coach
- 26 January – Barry Round, Australian rules footballer (died 2022)
- 30 January – Jack Newton, golfer (died 2022)
- 11 February – John Cobb, politician
- 14 February – Phil Dent, tennis player
- 16 February – Malcolm Blight, Australian Rules football player
- 20 February – Garry Manuel, football (soccer) player
- 1 March – Estelle Blackburn, journalist
- 11 March – Sam Kekovich, Australian Rules football player
- 18 March – Larry Perkins, ATCC/V8 Supercars racing driver
- 20 March – Warren Snowdon, politician
- 10 April – Mick Dodson, indigenous leader
- 11 April – Jim Molan, politician and army officer (died 2023)
- 13 April – Tommy Raudonikis, rugby league player and coach (died 2021)
- 15 April – Peter Cochrane, historian
- 21 April – Bruce Duperouzel, footballer and cricketer
- 29 April – Phillip Noyce, film director
- 11 May – Gary Foley, indigenous activist
- 15 May – Jim Bacon, Premier of Tasmania (2001–2004, died 2004)
- 26 May – Paul Omodei, WA politician
- 29 May – Lesley Hunt, tennis player
- 31 May – Warren Entsch, politician
- 13 June – Belinda Bauer, actress
- 13 July – Kevin McQuay, businessman (died 2005)
- 15 July
  - Colin Barnett, WA politician
  - Alan Hurst, cricketer
  - Peter Reith, politician (died 2022)
- 17 July – Nick Bolkus, politician (died 2025)
- 21 July – Allan Maher, football (soccer) goalkeeper
- 28 July – Jim Maxwell, cricket commentator
- 8 August – Philip Salom, poet and novelist
- 16 August – Jeff Thomson, cricketer
- 19 August – Graeme Beard, cricketer
- 6 September – Robyn Davidson, writer
- 8 September – Mark Gable, singer-songwriter
- 11 September – Bruce Doull, Australian Rules football player
- 27 September – John Marsden, writer (died 2024)
- 14 October – Kate Grenville, novelist
- 30 October – Tim Sheens, rugby league footballer and coach
- 2 November – Graeme Murphy, choreographer
- 7 November – John Lang, rugby league footballer and coach
- 25 November – Alexis Wright, writer
- 1 December – Ross Hannaford, guitarist (Daddy Cool) (died 2016)
- 10 December – Robert Cusack, swimmer
- 12 December
  - Louis Nowra, writer and playwright
  - Judy Wajcman, sociologist
- 18 December – Gillian Armstrong, film director
- 22 December – Nick Enright, playwright, director (died 2003)

=== Unknown date ===
- Heather Goodall, historian (died 2026)

== Deaths ==
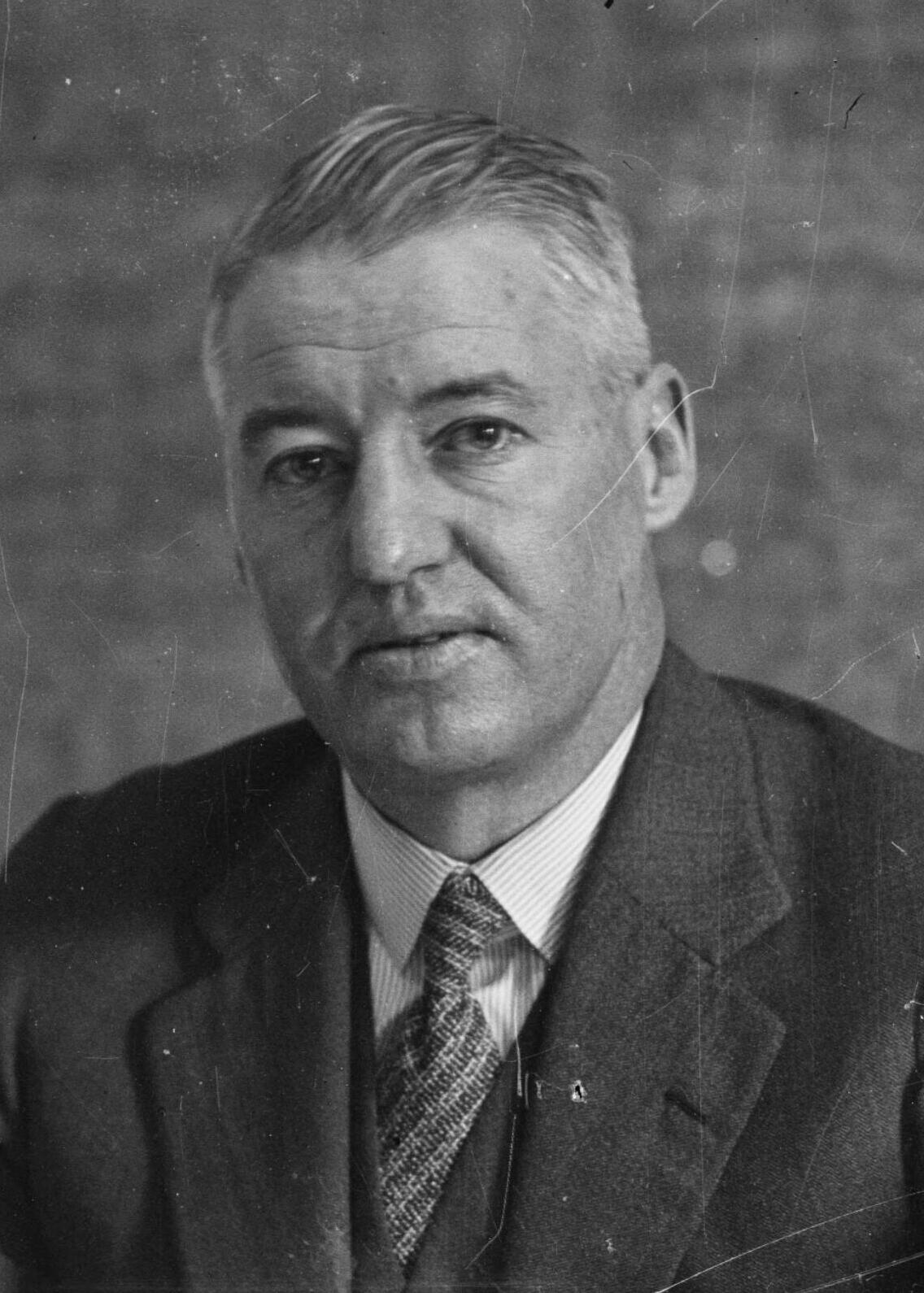
Ted Theodore

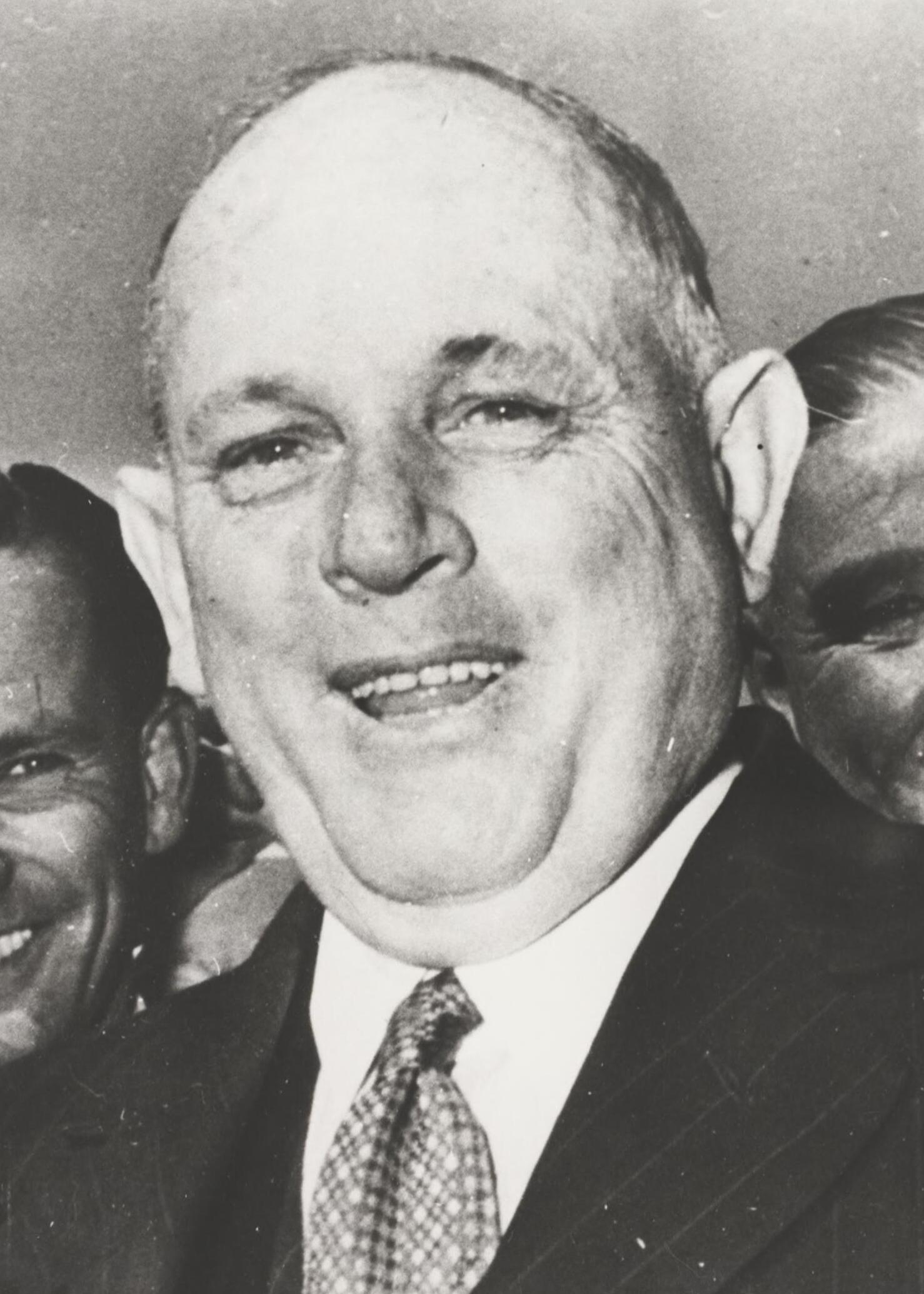
Sir Albert Dunstan

- 2 January
  - James Dooley, 21st Premier of New South Wales (born in Ireland) (b. 1877)
  - Beaumont Smith, film director and producer (b. 1885)
- 20 January – Ray Duggan, speedway racer (b. 1913)
- 25 January – Chummy Fleming, trade unionist (born in the United Kingdom) (b. 1863)
- 9 February – Ted Theodore, 20th Premier of Queensland (b. 1884)
- 23 February – Henry Willis, New South Wales politician (b. 1860)
- 19 March – Harry Wright, Australian rules footballer (Essendon) (b. 1870)
- 14 April – Sir Albert Dunstan, 33rd Premier of Victoria (b. 1882)
- 6 May – Lancelot De Mole, engineer and inventor (b. 1880)
- 15 May – Jack Hickey, Olympic rugby union and league player (b. 1887)
- 11 June – Ernest Henshaw, Western Australian politician (b. 1870)
- 20 June – Claude Jennings, cricketer (b. 1884)
- 14 July – Bill Howell, cricketer (b. 1869)
- 31 July – George Wise, Victorian politician and solicitor (b. 1853)
- 6 August – Edwin Corboy, Western Australian politician (b. 1896)
- 8 August – Sir Fergus McMaster, businessman and aviation pioneer (b. 1879)
- 3 September – Michael Durack, Western Australian politician and pastoralist (b. 1865)
- 22 September – Edward Fowell Martin, public servant and soldier (b. 1875)
- 24 September – Dame Mary Cook, 6th Spouse of the Prime Minister of Australia (born in the United Kingdom) (b. 1863)
- 6 November – Frank Brennan, Victorian politician (b. 1873)
- 20 November – Erle Cox, journalist and science fiction author (b. 1873)
- 2 December – James Fenton, Victorian politician (b. 1864)
- 29 December – Albert Lane, New South Wales politician (b. 1873)

== See also ==
- List of Australian films of the 1950s
