= 1951 in Australia =

- Monarch: George VI
- Governor-General: William McKell
- Prime minister: Robert Menzies
- Population: 8,421,775
- Elections: Federal

The following lists events that happened during 1951 in Australia.

- Decades: 1930s; 1940s; 1950s; 1960s; 1970s
- See also: 1951 in Australian literature; Other events of 1951; Federal election; Timeline of Australian history

== Incumbents ==
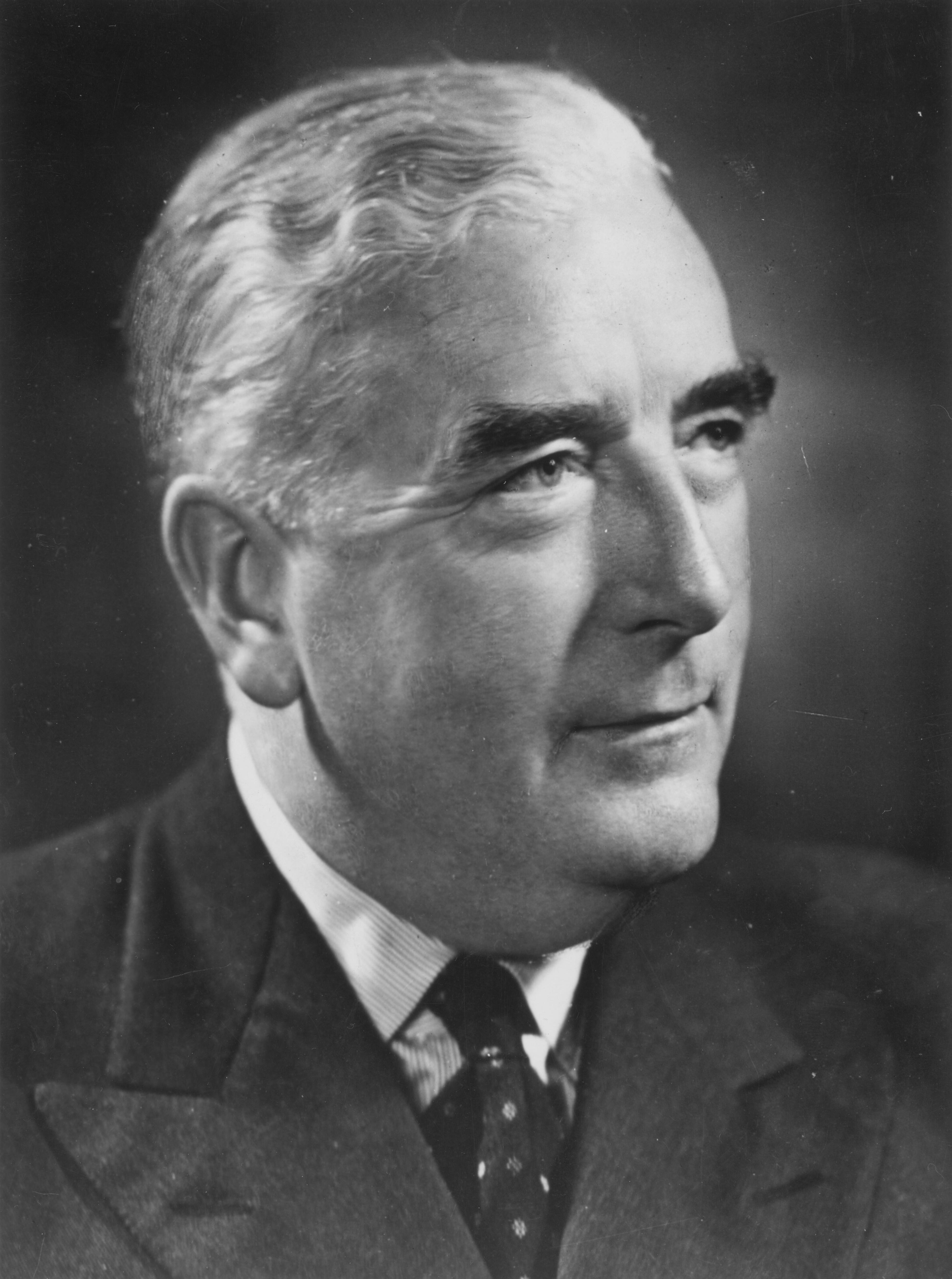
Robert Menzies

- Monarch – George VI
- Governor-General – (Sir) William McKell
- Prime Minister – Robert Menzies
- Chief Justice – Sir John Latham

=== State Premiers ===
- Premier of New South Wales – James McGirr
- Premier of Queensland – Ned Hanlon
- Premier of South Australia – Thomas Playford IV
- Premier of Tasmania – Robert Cosgrove
- Premier of Victoria – John McDonald
- Premier of Western Australia – Ross McLarty

=== State Governors ===
- Governor of New South Wales – Sir John Northcott
- Governor of Queensland – Sir John Lavarack
- Governor of South Australia – Sir Charles Norrie
- Governor of Tasmania – Sir Hugh Binney (until 8 May), then Sir Ronald Cross, 1st Baronet (from 22 August)
- Governor of Victoria – Sir Dallas Brooks
- Governor of Western Australia – Sir James Mitchell (until 1 July), then Sir Charles Gairdner (from 6 November)

== Events ==
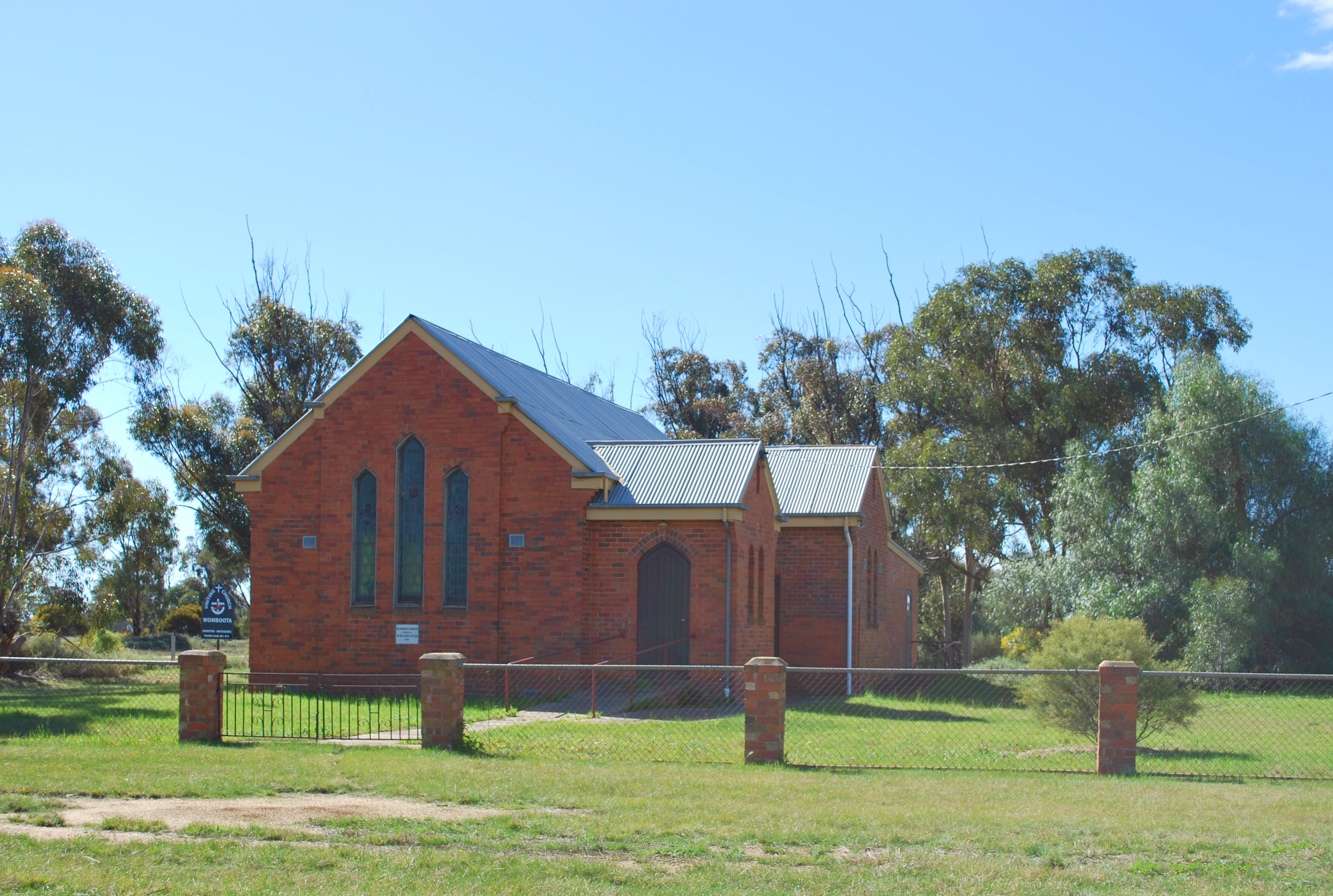
Womboota Uniting Church, built in 1951

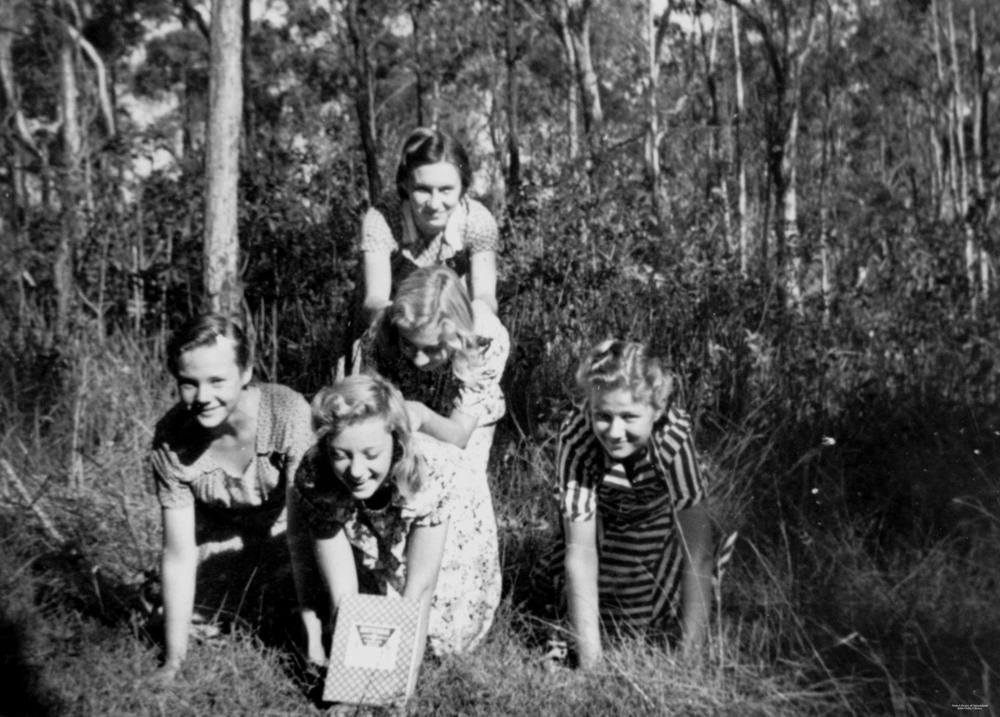
Five Latvian girls in the bush near Brisbane, 1951

- 1 January – The 50th anniversary of Australian federation is celebrated.
- 19 February – Jean Lee becomes the last woman to be hanged in Australia, when she, Robert Clayton and Norman Andrews are executed in Melbourne for the murder of a 73-year-old man.
- 1 March – The Bank of Australasia merges with the Union Bank of Australia to form the ANZ Bank.
- 9 March – The High Court of Australia rules in the case Australian Communist Party v Commonwealth that the Communist Party Dissolution Bill 1950, passed by the parliament to ban the Communist Party of Australia, was unconstitutional.
- 19 March – The Governor-General, William McKell, issues a double dissolution of parliament for the second time in its history, citing the Senate's referral of the Commonwealth Bank Bill as a "failure to pass" the bill.
- 12 April – Conscription begins as the first call-up notice is issued under the National Service Act (1951), requiring Australian 18-year-old males to undergo compulsory military training.
- 28 April – A federal election is held. The Liberal government of Robert Menzies retains power.
- 8 June – The first lessons of the School of the Air are broadcast from the Royal Flying Doctor Service in Adelaide.
- 13 June – Labor leader and former Prime Minister Ben Chifley suddenly dies of a heart attack.
- 20 June – Herbert Vere Evatt succeeds Ben Chifley as leader of the Labor Party.
- 16 August – The Australian Financial Review is first published.
- 1 September – The Anzus Treaty, between Australia, New Zealand and the United States, is signed.
- 9 September – Australia signs the Treaty of San Francisco, formalising peace with Japan.
- 22 September – A federal referendum is held, proposing to alter the Australian Constitution to allow the banning of the Communist Party. The referendum was not carried.
- 4 October – Francis McEncroe sells the first Chiko Rolls at the Wagga Wagga agricultural show.
- 15 October – A De Havilland Dove aircraft crashes near Kalgoorlie killing all 7 on board.
- 13 November – William McKell is gazetted a Knight Grand Cross of the Order of St Michael and St George, becoming the only Governor-General of Australia to be knighted during their term.

== Arts and literature ==
- Ivor Hele wins the Archibald Prize with his portrait of Laurie Thomas
- Justin O'Brien wins the inaugural Blake Prize for Religious Art with his work The Virgin Enthroned

== Sport ==
- Athletics
  - 5 March – Gordon Stanley wins the men's national marathon title, clocking 2:59:44.6 in Hobart.
- Cricket
  - Victoria wins the Sheffield Shield
  - Australia defeats England 4–1 in The Ashes
- Football
  - The 1951 French rugby league tour of Australia and New Zealand is conducted
  - Bledisloe Cup: won by the All Blacks
  - Brisbane Rugby League premiership: Souths defeated Easts 20-10
  - New South Wales Rugby League premiership: South Sydney defeated Manly-Warringah 42-14
  - South Australian National Football League premiership: won by Port Adelaide
  - Victorian Football League premiership: Geelong defeated Essendon 81-70
- Golf
  - Australian Open: won by Peter Thomson
  - Australian PGA Championship: won by Norman Von Nida
- Horse racing
  - Basha Felika wins the Caulfield Cup
  - Bronton wins the Cox Plate
  - Delta wins the Melbourne Cup
- Motor racing
  - The Australian Grand Prix was held at Narrogin and won by Warwick Pratley driving a George Reed Special
- Tennis
  - Australian Open men's singles: Dick Savitt defeats Ken McGregor 6-3 2–6 6-3 6-1
  - Australian Open women's singles: Nancye Wynne Bolton defeats Thelma Coyne Long 6-1 7-5
  - Davis Cup: Australia defeats the United States 3–2 in the 1951 Davis Cup final
  - US Open: Frank Sedgman wins the Men's Singles
  - Wimbledon: Ken McGregor and Frank Sedgman win the Men's Doubles
- Yachting
  - Margaret Rintoul takes line honours and Struen Marie wins on handicap in the Sydney to Hobart Yacht Race

== Births ==
- 19 January – Charles Blunt, politician
- 20 January – Clyde Sefton, road cyclist
- 22 January – Steve J. Spears, actor, singer, and playwright (died 2007)
- 26 February – Wayne Goss, Premier of Queensland (died 2014)
- 29 April – Jon Stanhope, Chief Minister of the ACT
- 29 May – Don Baird, pole vaulter
- 4 July – John Alexander, tennis player and politician
- 6 July – Geoffrey Rush, actor
- 31 July – Evonne Goolagong Cawley, tennis player
- 6 August – Daryl Somers, television personality
- 20 August – Mark Kennedy, drummer (died 2026)
- 30 August
  - Danny Clark, track cyclist and road bicycle racer
  - Brad Hazzard, politician
- 9 September – Alexander Downer, politician
- 27 September – Geoff Gallop, Premier of Western Australia
- 9 October – Rod Galt, Australian rules footballer (died 2019)
- 14 November – Shelley Hancock, politician
- 1 December – Doug Mulray, radio personality (died 2023)
- 18 December – Andy Thomas, astronaut
- 22 December – Jan Stephenson, professional golfer

== Deaths ==
- 29 January – Frank Tarrant, cricketer (b. 1880)
- 18 April – Daisy Bates, journalist and anthropologist (born in Ireland) (b. 1859)
- 27 May – Sir Thomas Blamey, field marshal (b. 1884)
- 11 June – William Higgs, Queensland politician (b. 1862)
- 13 June – Ben Chifley, 16th Prime Minister of Australia (b. 1885)
- 17 June - Vin Coutie, footballer (b. 1881)
- 3 July – Sydney Jephcott, poet (b. 1864)
- 4 October – Bartlett Adamson, journalist, poet, author and political activist (b. 1884)
- 10 December – Ernest Edwin Mitchell, composer (b. 1865)

== See also ==
- List of Australian films of the 1950s
