= 1959 in Australia =

- Monarch: Elizabeth II
- Governor-General: William Slim
- Prime minister: Robert Menzies
- Population: 10,056,479
- Elections: SA, WA, NSW, TAS

The following lists events that happened during 1959 in Australia.

- Decades: 1930s; 1940s; 1950s; 1960s; 1970s
- See also: 1959 in Australian television; 1959 in Australian literature; Other events of 1959; Timeline of Australian history

== Incumbents ==
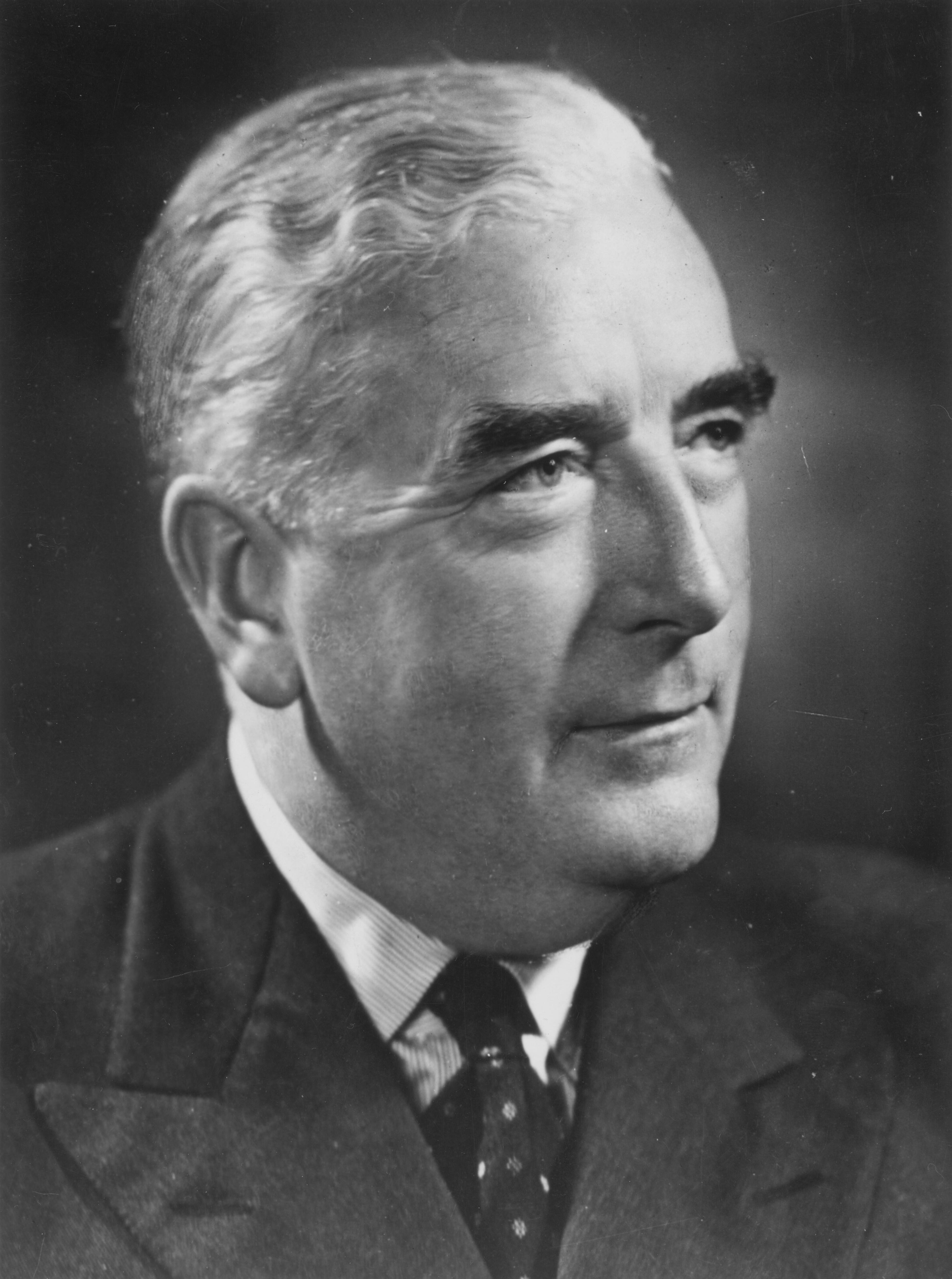
Robert Menzies

- Monarch – Elizabeth II
- Governor-General – Sir William Slim
- Prime Minister – Robert Menzies
- Chief Justice – Sir Owen Dixon

=== State Premiers ===
- Premier of New South Wales – Joseph Cahill (until 22 October), then Robert Heffron
- Premier of South Australia – Sir Thomas Playford
- Premier of Queensland – Frank Nicklin
- Premier of Tasmania – Eric Reece
- Premier of Western Australia – Albert Hawke (until 2 April), then David Brand
- Premier of Victoria – Henry Bolte

=== State Governors ===
- Governor of New South Wales – Sir Eric Woodward
- Governor of Queensland – Sir Henry Abel Smith
- Governor of South Australia – Sir Robert George
- Governor of Tasmania – Thomas Corbett, 2nd Baron Rowallan (from 21 October)
- Governor of Victoria – Sir Dallas Brooks
- Governor of Western Australia – Sir Charles Gairdner

== Events ==
- 26 January (Australia Day) – Darwin was granted city status
- 12 February – The Melbourne outdoor performance venue the Sidney Myer Music Bowl is officially opened by Prime Minister Robert Menzies.
- 15 February – American evangelist Billy Graham begins a tour of Australia.
- February – major floods in Queensland
- March – formal construction of the Sydney Opera House began
- 4 June – the Soviet embassy in Canberra was reopened. It had been closed since 29 April 1954 as a result of the Petrov Affair
- July - Westfield open its first location. Westfield Plaza in Blacktown. With 12 shops, 2 department stores and a supermarket, people flocked to see the plaza which newspapers of the day described as 'the most modern American-type combined retail centre'. By year-end Westfield Plaza was established as Blacktown's commercial hub.
- 29 July – Qantas launched its first jet service from Sydney to San Francisco via Nadi and Honolulu.
- August and September – Princess Alexandra toured Australia
- September – Australian National University building an "Atom Smasher"
- 23 September the M/S Princess of Tasmania Australia's first passenger Roll-on/roll-off diesel ferry makes maiden voyage across Bass Strait.
- November – Donald Bradman batted for 15 minutes in a demonstration. He retired from cricket.
- 11 December – Georgian-born Australian amateur ocean rower Michael 'Tarzan' Fomenko arrives in Dutch New Guinea having paddled a dugout canoe from Queensland for months via the islands of the Torres Strait for supplies. National papers such as The Canberra Times had been following his progress throughout.

== Arts and literature ==
- 23 February – The National Institute of Dramatic Art is officially opened at the University of New South Wales in Sydney by chairman of the Australian Elizabethan Theatre Trust, Nugget Coombs.
- William Dobell wins the Archibald Prize with a portrait of Dr Edward MacMahon
- The Big Fellow by Vance Palmer wins the Miles Franklin Literary Award

== Film ==
On the Beach starring Gregory Peck and Ava Gardner was shot around Melbourne. The film was based on the novel by Nevil Shute.

== Television ==
Six O'Clock Rock screened on the Australian Broadcasting Commission's channel. It was compered by Johnny O'Keefe and was the ABC's response to Bandstand on Channel Nine.

Adelaide's first television station, NWS-9, begins broadcasting on 5 September

== Sport ==
- Cricket
  - New South Wales won the Sheffield Shield
  - England toured Australia in the summer of 1958/59 for The Ashes; Australia won the series 4–0.
- Football
  - Brisbane Rugby League premiership: Northern Suburbs defeated Brothers 24–18
  - New South Wales Rugby League premiership: St. George defeated Manly–Warringah 20–0
  - South Australian National Football League premiership: won by Port Adelaide
  - Victorian Football League premiership: Melbourne defeated Essendon 115–78
- Golf
  - Australian Open: won by Kel Nagle
- Horse racing
  - Regal Wench wins the Caulfield Cup
  - Noholme wins the Cox Plate
  - Fine and Dandy wins the Golden Slipper
  - Macdougal wins the Melbourne Cup
- Motor racing
  - Jack Brabham wins the 1959 Formula One Drivers' Championship
  - The Australian Grand Prix was held at Longford, Tasmania and won by Stan Jones driving a Maserati
- Tennis
  - Australian Open men's singles: Alex Olmedo defeats Neale Fraser 6–1 6–2 3–6 6–3
  - Australian Open women's singles: Mary Carter defeats Renee Schuurman 6–2 6–3
  - Davis Cup: Australia defeats the United States 3–2 in the 1959 Davis Cup final
- Yachting
  - Solo takes line honours and Cherana wins on handicap in the Sydney to Hobart Yacht Race

== Births ==
- 8 January – Mike Harwood, golfer
- 29 January – Nick Xenophon, lawyer and politician
- 31 January – Anthony LaPaglia, actor
- 8 February – Andrew Hoy, equestrian rider
- 12 February – Sigrid Thornton, actress
- 24 February – Mike Whitney, cricketer
- 5 June – Mark Ella, rugby union player
- 8 July – Rhoda Roberts, arts journalist and administrator (died 2026)
- 21 July
  - Paul Vautin, rugby league footballer, coach and media personality
  - Gene Miles, rugby league footballer
- 26 July – Gary Honey, long jumper
- 12 August – Kerry Boustead, rugby league footballer
- 19 August – Rodney Adler, businessman
- 30 August – Mark "Jacko" Jackson, footballer and actor
- 12 September – Brad Dalton, basketball player
- 6 October – Robyn Maher, basketball player
- 11 October – Wayne Gardner, motorcycle and touring car racer
- 16 October – Martin Sacks, actor
- 24 October – Rowland S. Howard, musician (died 2009)
- 4 September – Kevin Harrington, Australian actor
- 4 November – Mark Speakman, politician
- 13 November – Anne Manning, racewalker
- 1 December – Wally Lewis, rugby league footballer and coach
- 12 December – Christine Stanton, high jumper
- 15 December – Greg Matthews, cricketer

== Deaths ==
- 2 January – William Douglas Francis b. 1889), botanist
- 22 February – Harold Hardwick (b. 1888), freestyle swimmer
- 20 June – Sir Ian Clunies Ross (b. 1899), scientist
- 21 July – Lydia Abell (b. 1872), military nurse, recipient of Royal Red Cross (RRC)
- 3 August – Herb Byrne (b. 1887), Australian rules footballer
- 8 August – Albert Namatjira (b. 1902), Aboriginal artist
- 11 August – Marjorie Margaret Conley (b. 1931), operatic soprano
- 19 September – Arthur Hennessy (b. 1876), Australia's first rugby league captain
- 14 October – Errol Flynn (b. 1909), actor (died in Canada)
- 14 October – Jack Davey (b. 1907), radio comedian and quiz show host
- 22 October – Joseph Cahill (b. 1891), Premier of New South Wales (1952–1959)
- 2 November – Michael Considine (b. 1885), politician
- 11 November – Charles Chauvel (b. 1897), filmmaker
- 24 November – Dally Messenger (b. 1883), rugby union and league footballer
- 18 December – Edouard Borovansky (b. 1902), Czech born ballet dancer and choreographer; founder of the Borovansky Australian Ballet

== See also ==
- 1959 in Australian television
- List of Australian films of the 1950s
