= 1956 in Australia =

- Monarch: Elizabeth II
- Governor-General: William Slim
- Prime minister: Robert Menzies
- Population: 9,425,563
- Elections: WA, SA, NSW, TAS, QLD

The following lists events that happened during 1956 in Australia.

- Decades: 1930s; 1940s; 1950s; 1960s; 1970s
- See also: 1956 in Australian television; 1956 in Australian literature; Other events of 1956; Timeline of Australian history

== Incumbents ==
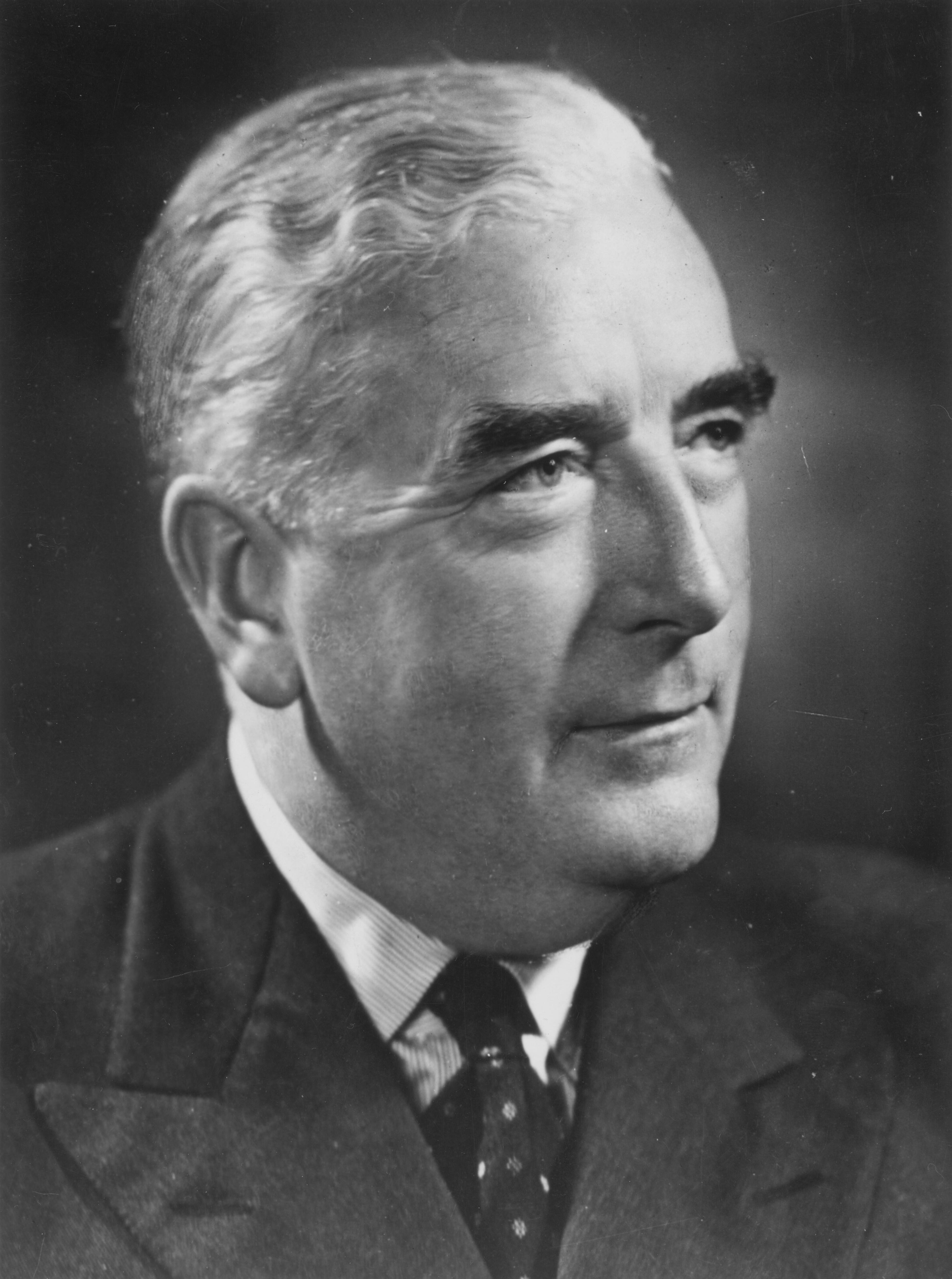
Robert Menzies

- Monarch – Elizabeth II
- Governor-General – Sir William Slim
- Prime Minister – Robert Menzies
- Chief Justice – Sir Owen Dixon

=== State Premiers ===
- Premier of New South Wales – Joseph Cahill
- Premier of Queensland – Vince Gair
- Premier of South Australia – Thomas Playford IV
- Premier of Tasmania – Robert Cosgrove
- Premier of Victoria – Henry Bolte
- Premier of Western Australia – Albert Hawke

=== State Governors ===
- Governor of New South Wales – Sir John Northcott
- Governor of Queensland – Sir John Lavarack
- Governor of South Australia – Sir Robert George
- Governor of Tasmania – Sir Ronald Cross, 1st Baronet
- Governor of Victoria – Sir Dallas Brooks
- Governor of Western Australia – Sir Charles Gairdner

== Events ==
- August - The Murray River flooded (the biggest flood in recorded history), affecting many towns near the river.
- 22 November – The 1956 Summer Olympics opened in Melbourne. The opening ceremony was held at the Melbourne Cricket Ground with 107,700 people watching.

== Arts and literature ==
- William Dargie wins the Archibald Prize for his portrait of Albert Namatjira
- Quadrant literary magazine is founded, edited by James McAuley

== Television ==
- 16 September – Australia's first TV station TCN-9 begins regular transmission in Sydney
- 4 November - HSV-7 begins as Melbourne's first TV Station.
- 5 November – The first TV station of the Australian Broadcasting Commission is launched; ABN-2 Sydney.

== Sport ==
- 8 September – John Russell wins his first men's national marathon title, clocking 2:26:37.8 in Melbourne.
- Melbourne Cup winner in 1956 was Evening Peal, ridden by George Podmore Trained by E.D.Lawson
- New South Wales wins the Sheffield Shield
- Kurrewa IV takes line honours and Solo wins on handicap in the Sydney to Hobart Yacht Race
- New South Wales Rugby League premiership: St George defeated Balmain
- Victorian Football League premiership: Melbourne defeated Collingwood
- Australian Men's Tennis Championship was won by Lew Hoad from NSW aged 22
- Australian Women's Tennis Championship was won by Miss Mary Carter

== Births ==
- 9 January – Bill Leak, editorial cartoonist (d. 2017)
- 20 January – Richard Morecroft, English-Australian journalist (d. 2026)
- 29 January – Ian Davies, basketball player (d. 2013)
- 6 February – Ken Lorraway, triple jumper (d. 2007)
- 27 February – Andrea Mitchell, Western Australian politician and sports administrator (d. 2020)
- 7 March – David Koch, television personality
- 9 March – Steve Vizard, actor
- 9 May – Jana Wendt, journalist
- 22 May – Peter Ali, basketball player
- 15 July – Steve Mortimer, rugby league footballer
- 21 July – Andy Campbell, basketball player
- 31 July – Ernie Dingo, actor
- 12 August – Suzanne Twelftree, Paralympic wheelchair tennis player and powerlifter (d. 2019)
- 17 August – John Kosmina, soccer player and manager
- 17 September – Ross Glendinning, Australian Rules footballer
- 17 September – Yunupingu, musician (Yothu Yindi) and community leader (d. 2013)
- 7 November
  - Michael Wooldridge, politician
  - Gordon McLeod, basketball player and assistant coach.
- 14 November – John Anderson, politician
- 23 November – Shane Gould, swimmer
- 21 December – Mark McArdle, Queensland politician (d. 2020)

== Deaths ==
- 20 March – Fanny Durack, (b. 1889), swimmer
- 29 May – Frank Beaurepaire, (b. 1891), swimmer and politician
- 12 July – John Hayes, (b. 1868), Premier of Tasmania
- 9 August – Archie Cameron, politician (b. 1895)

== See also ==
- List of Australian films of the 1950s
