= List of Australian films of the 1950s =

This is a chronological list of Australian films of the 1950s. For a complete alphabetical list, see Category:Australian films.

== 1950s ==
Title	Director	Cast	Genre	Notes
1950
Bitter Springs	Ralph Smart	Tommy Trinder, Chips Rafferty, Gordon Jackson, Jean Blue, Michael Pate, Bud Tingwell, Nonnie Piper, Nicky Yardley		IMDb
The Kangaroo Kid				
1951
The Glenrowan Affair				
1952
Mike and Stefani	R. Maslyn Williams		Documentary	NFSA
Night Club				
1953
Captain Thunderbolt				
King of the Coral Sea				
The Phantom Stockman	Lee Robinson	Chips Rafferty, Victoria Shaw, Guy Doleman		
Wherever She Goes	Michael Gordon	Eileen Joyce, Suzanne Parrett, Muriel Steinbeck, Nigel Lovell, John Wiltshire, George Wallace, Tim Drysdale, Syd Chambers, Rex Dawe, Sefton Daly, Jacqueline Cat	Drama	IMDb
1954
The Back of Beyond	John Heyer	Tom Kruse	Documentary	IMDb
Long John Silver	Byron Haskin	Robert Newton, Rod Taylor	Adventure	IMDb
1955
Jedda	Charles Chauvel	Ngarla Kunoth, Robert Tudawali, Betty Suttor, Paul Reynall, George Simpson-Lyttle, Tas Fitzer, Wason Byers, Willie Farrar, Margaret Dingle, Nosepeg		
1956
Olympic Games 1956				
Walk Into Paradise	Marcello Pagliero, Lee Robinson	Chips Rafferty, Francoise Christophe, Reg Lye, Pierre Cressoy, Sergeant Major Somu, District Officer Fred Kaad, Captain Richard Davis	Adventure	Entered into the 1956 Cannes Film Festival; Co-production with France
Smiley				IMDb
1957
Robbery Under Arms				IMDb
Three in One				
1958
Conquest of the Rivers				AFI winner for Best Film
Dust in the Sun				
Hard to Windward				AFI winner for Best Film
Smiley Gets a Gun				
The Stowaway	Lee Robinson, Ralph Habib	Martine Carol, Karlheinz Böhm, Roger Livesey, Serge Reggiani, Arletty	Adventure, Drama	Co-production with France
1959
The Restless and the Damned	Yves Allégret	Edmond O'Brien, Richard Basehart, Andrea Parisy, Nicole Berger, Nigel Lovell, Reg Lye, Jean Marchat, Denise Vernac	Drama	IMDb; Co-production with France and Italy
Edge of the Deep				AFI winner for Best Film
The Power Makers				AFI winner for Best Film
Summer of the Seventeenth Doll	Leslie Norman	Ernest Borgnine, Anne Baxter	Comedy	IMDb

== See also ==
- 1950 in Australia
- 1951 in Australia
- 1952 in Australia
- 1953 in Australia
- 1954 in Australia
- 1955 in Australia
- 1956 in Australia
- 1957 in Australia
- 1958 in Australia
- 1959 in Australia
- 1959 in Australian television
