= Carol Tomcala =

Australian sports shooter

Personal information
- Born: 22 November 1954 (age 71) Perth, Western Australia

Sport
- Country: Australia
- Sport: Sports shooting

Carol Tomcala (born 22 November 1954) is an Australian sports shooter. She competed in two events at the 1996 Summer Olympics.

Tomcala won bronze at the Oceanian Championships in Adelaide in the 10m pistol and 25m air pistol events in 1991. In the 1993 events in Auckland, she won silver and came seventh, respectively.
