= Randall Goff =

Australian water polo player

Personal information
- Born: March 15, 1953 (age 72); Cronulla, Australia

Sport
- Sport: Water polo

Randall Goff (born 15 March 1953) is a former water polo player from Australia, who competed for his native country at two consecutive Summer Olympics, starting in 1976. He finished in 11th and 7th position with the Australian National Men's Team.
