= Colin William Wright =

Australian cattle breeder and politician (1867–1952)

Colin William Wright (10 October 1867 – 14 December 1952) was an Australian cattle breeder, grazier, local government councillor, and local government head. Wright was born in Oxley, Brisbane, Queensland and died in Rockhampton, Queensland.

== See also ==
- Ralph Bodkin Kelley
- James Lockie Wilson
- Frank William Bulcock
