= Bega bombing =

1957 bombing in Australia

The Bega bombing occurred at 2:10 am on 29 July 1957 in the Australian town of Bega, New South Wales.

== Bombing ==
The bombing occurred when agricultural contractor Myron Bertrand Kelly detonated a bomb at a private residence in Bega to murder local police officer, Senior Constable Kenneth Desmond Coussens, his wife Elizabeth Mary Hamilton Coussens and their eight-month-old son Bruce James John Coussens. Elizabeth Coussens's 9-years-old son from a previous marriage, Roger McCampbell, survived the explosion.

The large explosion destroyed the front of the house, killing Kenneth Coussens, Elizabeth Coussens and Bruce Coussens instantly. Roger McCampbell was cared for by a neighbour during the aftermath until his uncle collected him from the scene. The blast was heard up to a mile away and damaged many buildings in Bega, including at the Bega Hospital where 100 windows were shattered.

Around 1,500 people attended the Coussens's funeral service which was held in Bega on 31 July 1957 with many local businesses in Bega closed for the day as a mark of respect.

=== Suspect interviewed and charged ===
Kelly was interviewed at Bega Police Station on 14 August 1957. In the interview, Kelly admitted that he had stolen five cases of gelignite from a silica mine and a six-gallon cream can from the Bega Creamery Society factory, and stored them on a property at Nethercote. Kelly said he had packed 240 sticks of gelignite into the can and then fit the can with a 20-feet long fuse and a detonator. He said he snuck over to the Coussens's residence in Girraween Crescent just before midnight on 28 July 1957 and placed the bomb on the front veranda. Kelly said he returned two hours later to light the fuse and then returned home just before the bomb exploded.

Kelly was charged with the three murders on 9 August 1957 and was remanded in custody.

=== Coroner's inquiry ===
It emerged during the coroner's inquiry which commenced on 14 October 1957 that Kelly had a long-standing grudge against Coussens. Kelly accused Coussens of harassment and claimed he was unfairly targeted by Coussens, having been stopped by Coussens on numerous occasions to issue him with fines and defect notices for his tractor and rotary hoe. Despite admitting to wanting to scare Coussens and cause superficial damage to his house after becoming frustrated at unsuccessful requests to local councillors and police officials to have Coussens transferred, Kelly said he hadn't intended to kill the family. Despite this, the coroner ruled the deaths were caused by the explosion which had been "feloniously and maliciously" caused by Kelly, who was committed for trial at the Central Criminal Court in Sydney.

=== Trial and verdict ===
After five days of evidence, a jury found Kelly guilty of murder at the Sydney Central Criminal Court on 6 December 1957, and he was sentenced to life imprisonment for the murders.

== Legacy ==
Kelly was released from prison in 1980 and lived at Austral Farm in Nimmitabel before moving to the Sir William Hudson Memorial Centre in Cooma. He died at the age of 83 on 4 July 2007.

There are current and former members of the Bega community who continue to believe Kelly was provoked and believed his claims that he hadn't wanted to cause physical harm to anybody during the bombing. However, the New South Wales Police Force disputes this, claiming Kelly had a fixation with explosives and that it was unreasonable to believe Kelly had simply wanted to scare Coussens with 240 sticks of gelignite. In 2007, a senior sergeant serving in Bega described Kelly as a "cold reckless killer".

The community of Bega regularly pauses to remember the tragedy and held commemorations for the 50th and 60th anniversaries of the bombing in 2007 and 2017 respectively.

In 2007, a monument at the Bega Police Station was unveiled by the New South Wales Police Force, dedicated to the Coussens family.

Coussens' stepson Roger McCampbell who survived the bombing turned 70 in October 2017 and early that year recalled in a newspaper interview his memories of that night and the long-lasting affects it had on him throughout his life.

The Bega bombing continues to be referenced as one of Australia's most shocking crimes.
