= Murder of Betty Shanks =

1952 case in Queensland, Australia

Betty Shanks
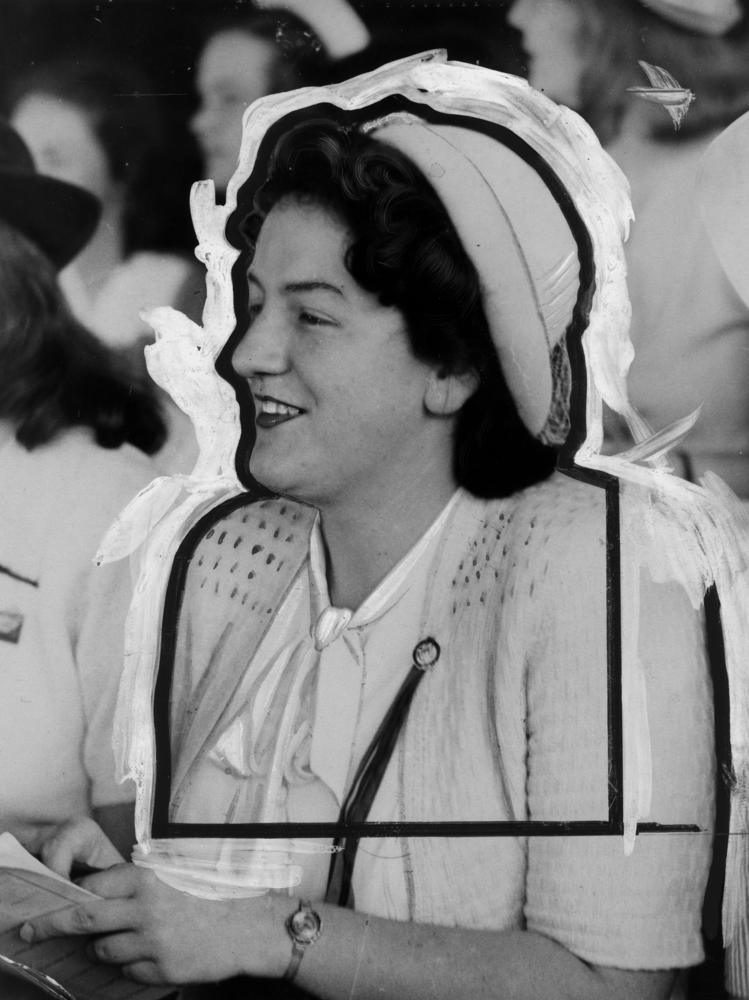
- Betty Shanks in September 1952
- Born: 10 October 1929; Wilston, Queensland, Australia
- Died: 19 September 1952 (aged 22); Grange, Queensland, Australia
- Education: The University of Queensland

On the night of 19 September 1952, Betty Shanks was brutally murdered while walking home in Grange, Brisbane, after getting off a tram. Her body was discovered the next morning, leading to Queensland's largest criminal investigation at the time. While various theories and false confessions have surfaced over the years, the case remains Queensland's oldest unsolved murder.

== Overview ==
Betty Shanks was a University of Queensland graduate and worked as a public servant for the Commonwealth's Department of Interior. She had grown up in the neighbourhood of Grange and continued to live with her parents.

On the night of 19 September 1952, Shanks attended a night lecture at the State Commercial High School in Brisbane, finishing around 9:00 PM. Her lecturer drove her to a tram stop in Windsor, where she boarded a tram to Grange. She was last seen alive disembarking at Days Road Terminus in Grange shortly after 9:30 PM. From there, she began her 400-meter walk along Thomas Street towards her home on Montpelier Street.

Shanks' father stayed up waiting for her, and when she did not return home, her parents reported her missing to the local police at 1:30 AM.

Her violently beaten body was found in the garden of a house on the corner of Carberry and Thomas Streets the next morning at 5:35 AM, by a nearby resident who was a policeman.

== Investigation ==
Police believe Shanks was murdered within a narrow 12-minute window between 9:38 PM and 9:53 PM. Witnesses reported hearing screams between 9:38 PM and 9:45 PM, and Shanks' wristwatch stopped at 9:53 PM.

Early in the investigation, police considered the possibility that Shanks was attacked by a sex offender. Another theory suggests that the murderer may have targeted the wrong woman, intending to attack a doctor's receptionist who walked the same route at the same time and had keys to a surgery containing drugs. Over the years, several individuals have confessed to the crime, but all confessions have been proven false.

At the time it was Queensland's biggest criminal investigation. As of 2024, a reward of A$50,000 remains current for information leading to the apprehension and conviction of those responsible for the murder.

== Related works ==
=== Books ===
Several books have been written about the murder and the authors have outlined who they believe the murderer to be. These works include:

- Who Killed Betty Shanks? (2006 (revised in 2012), author: Ken Blanch) Blanch suggested that Shanks was killed by a soldier.
- I Know Who Killed Betty Shanks (First edition 2014; Second edition 2019; Third edition 2022; author: Ted Duhs) Duhs theorized that Eric Sterry killed Shanks.
- The Thomas St Affair (2016, author: Lyle Reed) Reed proposed that Shanks was killed by a police officer riding a motorbike. The author did not reveal the killer's name in interviews prior to the book being published but did indicate he was a member of his family.

=== Film ===
- The Wilston Murder: The story of Betty Shanks (2012) This documentary was produced and directed by student filmmakers Maya Weidner and Becky Newman as a university project. The women believed the story was one that could resonate with a modern-day audience. Newman recalled learning about the murder at a young age, as her family was interested in history and had read Ken Blanch's book, Who Killed Betty Shanks? but believed the story was largely forgotten among her generation.

== See also ==
- List of unsolved murders (1900–1979)
