= Rose Hanigan =

Australian Sister of Mercy and hospital administrator

Mother Francis

Personal life
- Born: Rose Hanigan; 19 October 1864 Castlemaine, Victoria, Australia
- Died: 28 March 1952 (aged 87) East Melbourne, Australia
- Known for: First Superior of Mercy Hospital

Religious life
- Religion: Roman Catholic
- Order: Sisters of Mercy
- Profession: April 1895

Rose Hanigan (1864-1952), known by her religious name of Mother Francis, was an Australian Sister of Mercy and hospital administrator who was the founder and first Superior of the Mercy Private Hospital in East Melbourne, which opened in 1934.

== Early years ==
Rose Hanigan was born on 19 October 1864 at Barkers Creek, near Castlemaine, Victoria. Her Irish-born parents were John Hanigan, who was a labourer, and Anne Hanigan (née Cahill), who was a teacher. She was their sixth child. Rose left school to become a trainee milliner with McCreery & Hopkins, the leading emporium in Castlemaine and while achieving some success and becoming a senior salesperson, she decided instead to follow a religious vocation.

== Career ==
=== Religious life ===
In June 1892, at the age of 28, Hanigan started her novitiate and entered the Convent of Mercy in Bendigo. She made her vows in April 1895, choosing the religious name of Francis and became known as Sister (later Mother) Francis. Five years later she led a group of four sisters who were appointed to establish a Mercy foundation at Tatura.

The Sisters of Mercy is a religious order founded by Mother Catherine McAuley. It was established in 1831 in Dublin, Ireland; foundations were later established globally. The first Sisters of Mercy foundation in Australia was founded in Freemantle by Mother Ursula Frayne who travelled from Ireland to Australia in 1846. The Geelong convent was established by Mother Xavier Maguire in 1860.

After her work in Tatura, Sister Francis returned to Bendigo, where she was the superior of the convent between 1911 and 1916.

During her time in Bendigo, Sister Francis acted on medical advice and implemented precautions to protect the Sisters against the threat of tuberculosis which was of widespread concern in the area. She advocated for holistic healthcare which included fresh air, good diet and exercise.

=== Hospital administration ===
In 1920, in the aftermath of the worldwide threat of the pneumonic Spanish flu epidemic, which had infected 500 million people worldwide, the Sisters of Mercy decided to establish a private hospital in Melbourne to care for the sick. Coonil House, a mansion and former private residence in Malvern, was purchased and converted into St Benedict’s Hospital, the first hospital to be opened by the Sisters of Mercy in Victoria. Mother Francis was nominated to take on the role as the first Superior of the hospital in 1921 by members of the counsellors of the Chapter of the Sisters of Mercy. Mother Francis was required to attend to all aspects of the hospital’s management including overseeing renovations, appointing staff, registering the institution, and building relationships with leading doctors. (Sir) Hugh Devine was involved early and helped to ensure that his surgeon colleagues were well acquainted with St Benedicts. Prior to 1923 Victoria had no requirement for nurses and midwives to be trained or registered. However, the Sisters of Mercy had been training their nurses for some years, and Mother Francis and three other sisters were sent to Sydney and Brisbane to learn about nursing and hospital administration from the sisters who had been operating health services in New South Wales and Queensland from as early as 1906.

In 1946, the Mercy sisters decided to close the hospital because of staffing and financial difficulties. They continued to manage the hospital until 1948 when the Cabrini Sisters arrived in Melbourne and took over its administration. By that time, the Mercy Private Hospital in East Melbourne was well established. Mother Francis had the foresight to purchase a one-acre (0.4 ha) site on Clarendon Street in East Melbourne for the Mercy order in 1930. That same year, Mother Francis, accompanied by her assistant Sister Philippa Brazill (later Dame Philippa Brazil), researched the latest in hospital design by visiting the best and most modern hospitals in the United States. The sisters joined forces with architect Arthur George Stephenson, who was commissioned to design the 120-bed state-of-the-art Mercy Private Hospital. Work was delayed because of the difficulty in raising finance during the Depression but excavations began in February 1934 and the Mercy Hospital opened on 2 December 1934 with Mother Francis as its first Superior.

In 1940, the Mercy Private Hospital was declared a first-class hospital. This meant that trainees at the Mercy no longer had to go to other hospitals in order to gain their nursing skills. Sister Philippa had been the hospital’s nursing director since the hospital opened. In 1948 she succeeded Mother Francis as the Superior of the Mercy Private Hospital and community. In 1971 the Mercy Maternity Hospital opened on an adjoining site to the Mercy Private Hospital on Clarendon Street. It later became the Mercy Hospital for Women public hospital, which in 2004 moved to Heidelberg, Victoria.

== Death and legacy ==
On 28 March 1952, only four years after concluding her role as Superior, Mother Francis died at the Mercy Hospital. A requiem mass was held for her at St Patrick’s Cathedral in East Melbourne.

Her legacy is as a pioneer of nursing, of hospital design, and healthcare innovation, and as a leader in the Mercy tradition.

== Selected works ==
- Sister Mary Ignatius M. Ignatius O'Sullivan, “The wheel of time : a brief survey of the ninety-six years' work of the Sisters of Mercy in Victoria, 1857-1953” (Melb, 1954)

== See also ==
- Sisters of Mercy
