= 1955 Queensland Road Racing Championship =

Motor Road Race

The 1955 Queensland Road Racing Championship was a motor race held at the Southport circuit in Queensland, Australia on 6 November 1955. The race was held over 20 laps of the 5.7 mile (9.17 kilometre) circuit, a total distance of 114 miles (247.6 km). The meeting was conducted by the Queensland Motor Sporting Club in association with the Pacific Car Club.

The race was won by Steve Ames driving an Alfa Romeo.

== Classification ==
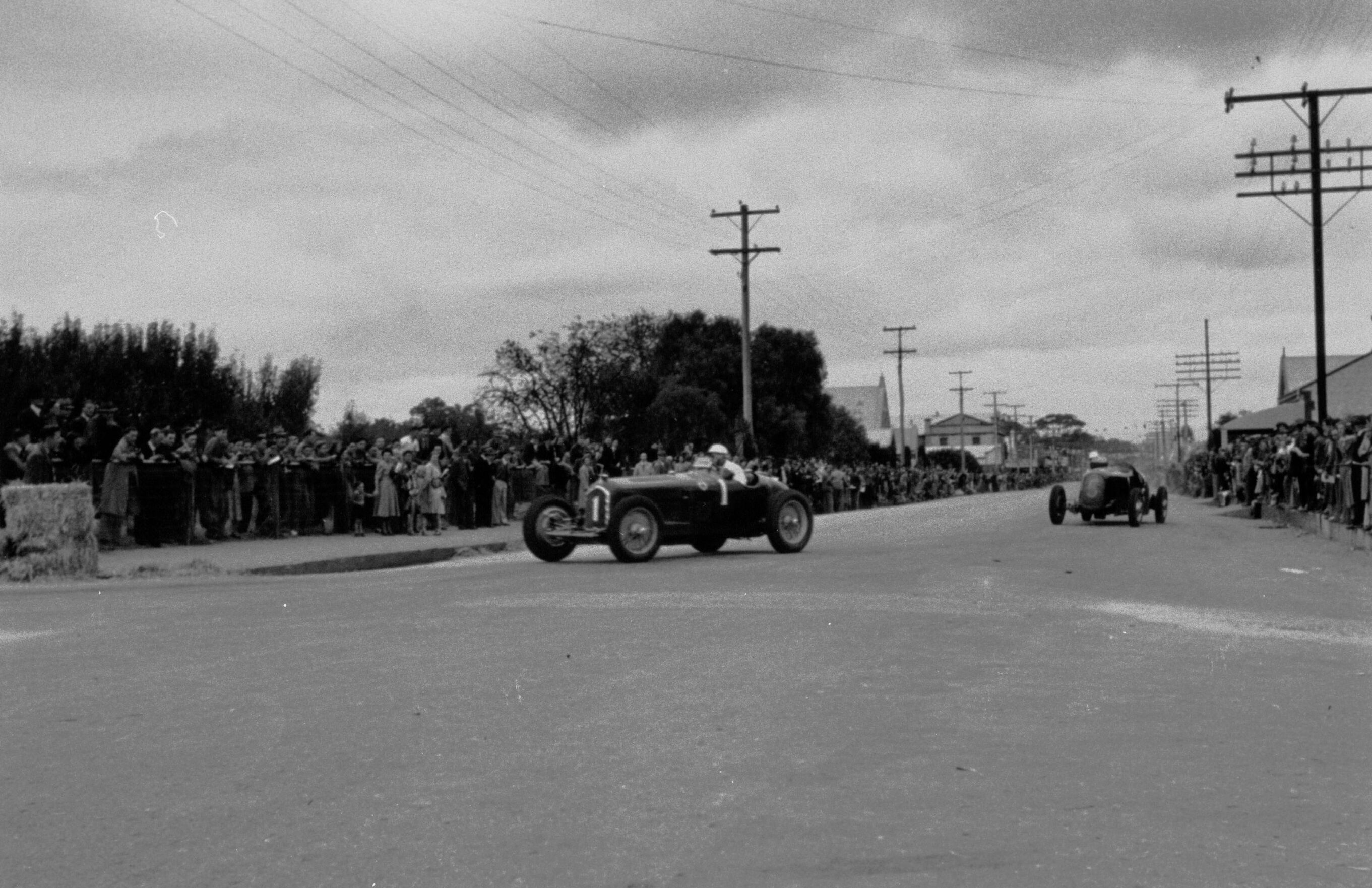
The winning Alfa Romeo P3 pictured in 1949 being driven by Lex Davison at the Nuriootpa circuit

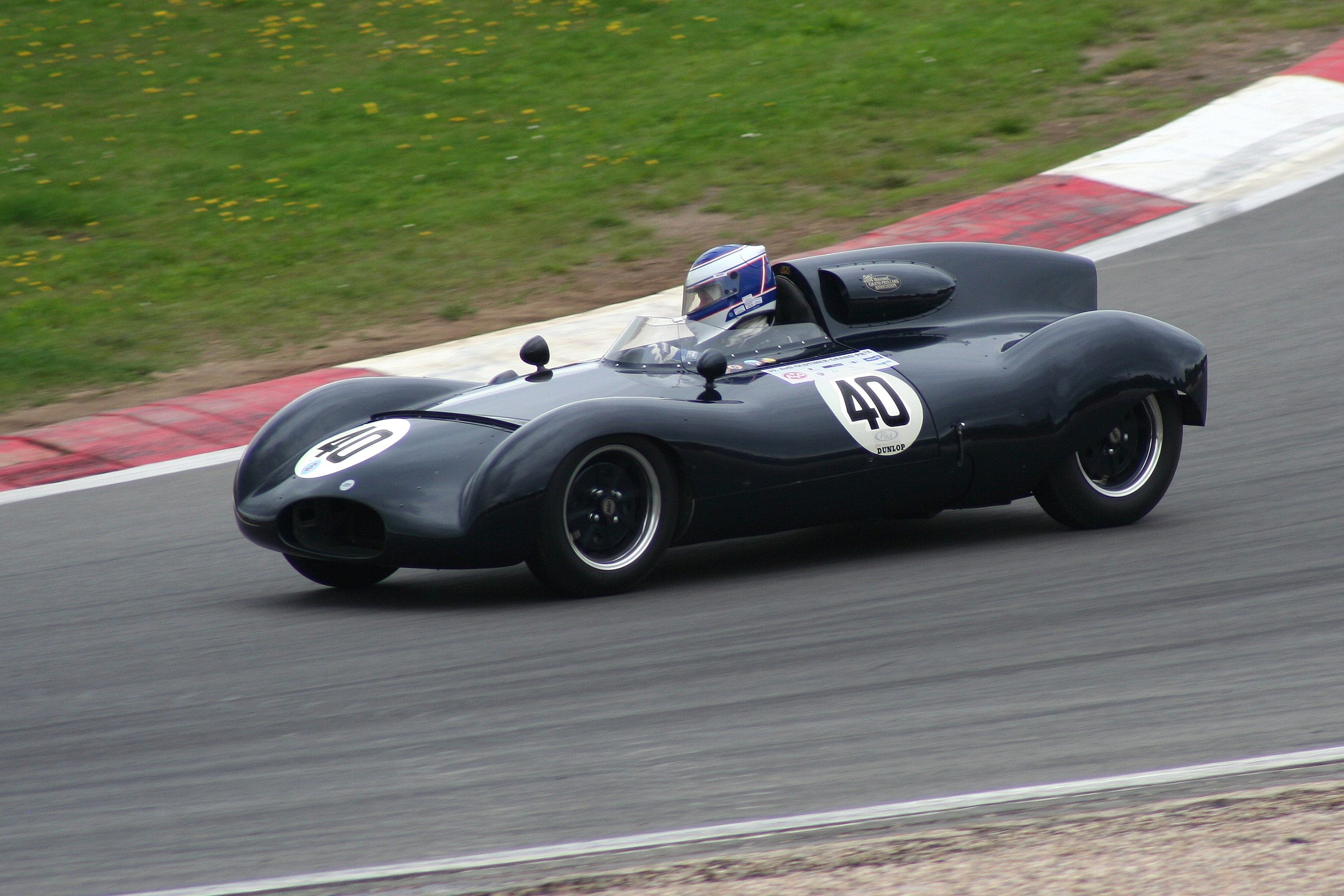
The Cooper T40, driven by Jack Brabham in the race, pictured in 2011

Position	Driver	No.	Car	Laps	Time / remarks
1	Steve Ames	8	Alfa Romeo P3		85m 27.3s
2	Ken Richardson		Talbot-Lago T26C		
3	Rex Taylor	25	Jaguar XK120		
4	Barry Griffiths	28	Triumph TR2		
5	Beau Mossetter		MG TC s/c		
6	N. Barnes		MG Special s/c		
?	?		?		
?	?		?		
?	?		?		
Did not finish	Lex Davison		HWM Jaguar	6	Broken steering arm
Did not finish	Jack Brabham	6	Cooper T40 Bristol	5	Bent valves

== Notes ==
- Attendance: nearly 15,000
- Starters: 11
- Finishers: 6
- Winning margin: 27 seconds
- Fastest lap: Jack Brabham, 3m 53s (88 mph)
- Handicap placings (over the first twelve laps): Griffiths, Taylor and Mossetter
