= Margaret Alison Telfer =

Australian university administrator (1904–1974)

Margaret Alison Telfer OBE
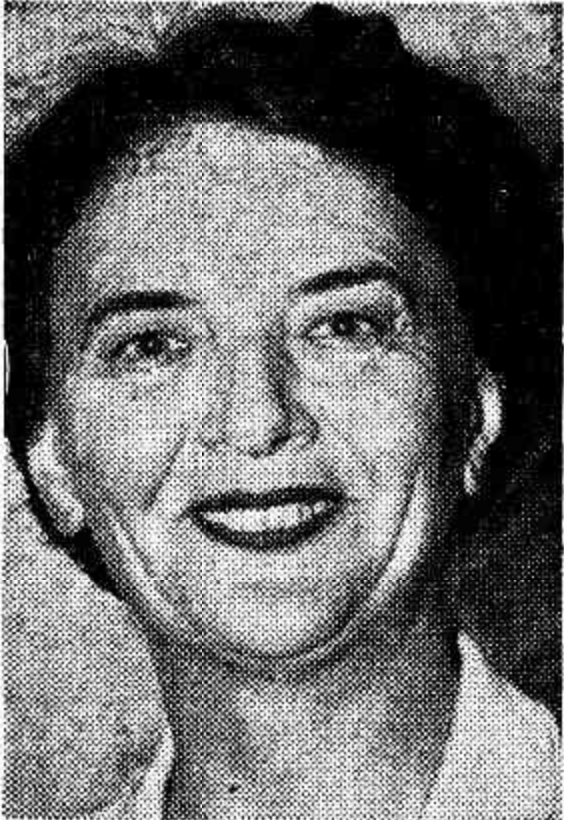
- Born: 21 October 1904; Lismore, New South Wales, Australia
- Died: 24 May 1974 (aged 69); Wollstonecraft, New South Wales, Australia
- Education: University of Sydney (BA 1925, DipEd 1926)
- Occupation: University administrator

Margaret Alison Telfer OBE (21 October 1904 – 24 May 1974) was a university administrator at the University of Sydney.

== Early life and education ==
Telfer was born in Lismore, New South Wales and attended high school in Tamworth and Newcastle. She entered the Women's College at the University of Sydney, completing a Bachelor of Arts in 1925 and a Diploma of Education in 1926. Telfer served as secretary of the Sydney University Women's Union from 1926, and later was appointed adviser to women students in 1939.

== Career ==
She became deputy assistant registrar in 1944, and was promoted to assistant registrar in 1947 and deputy registrar in 1950. In 1955 Telfer accepted the university senate's offer of the position of registrar, becoming the first woman to hold a top administrative post in any Australian university.

In 1956 she was awarded a travel grant from the Carnegie Corporation of New York which enabled her to study administration and student services in British and North American universities.

Telfer was a member of the Board of Social Studies (1940–55), and in 1956 was appointed to the committee that surveyed secondary education in New South Wales. One of the key recommendations of this committee was to extend high school courses by one year, introducing the idea of a school certificate examination after completing four years of secondary schooling, followed by two additional years that would result in acquiring a higher school certificate that would be accepted for university matriculation.

The committee also advocated for a wider curriculum rather than a secondary education system that comprised numerous specialised courses, their idea was that secondary schooling was "to educate for living and to awaken in the student the desire for knowledge"

Telfer was the president of the Australian Federation of University Women between 1958 and 1960.

In 1966, Telfer became the first woman to be appointed to the New South Wales Parole Board.

== Honours and recognition ==
In 1960 she was appointed as an Officer of the Order of the British Empire. In 1970, the University of Sydney conferred on her an honorary Doctor of Letters.

An administration building at the University of Sydney was named the Margaret Telfer Building in her honour.

== Personal life ==
Telfer enjoyed skiing, and was described as dignified, efficient, courteous, patient and sympathetic. At the time of her retirement in 1967, Professor W. M. O'Neil wrote of her as a "traditionalist" in a period of change who was "constantly reminding us whence we came and where we originally set out to go." He further pointed out that "she has of course not been able to please everyone. That was not possible and she knew it. That, indeed, is why she has made her way to the top."

== Death ==
Telfer died on 24 May 1974, of a coronary occlusion, at her Wollstonecraft home.
