= List of Wimbledon doubles champions =

The list of Doubles champions at the Wimbledon Championships can be found at:

- List of Wimbledon Gentlemen's Doubles champions
- List of Wimbledon Ladies' Doubles champions
- List of Wimbledon Mixed Doubles champions
