= 1971 in Australia =

- Monarch: Elizabeth II
- Governor-General: Sir Paul Hasluck
- Prime minister: John Gorton, then William McMahon
- Population: 12,507,349
- Australian of the Year: Evonne Goolagong
- Elections: NSW, WA

The following lists events that happened during 1971 in Australia.

- Decades: 1950s; 1960s; 1970s; 1980s; 1990s
- See also: 1971 in Australian literature; Other events of 1971; Timeline of Australian history

== Incumbents ==
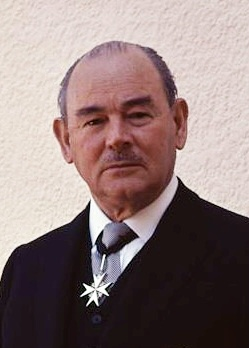
Sir Paul Hasluck

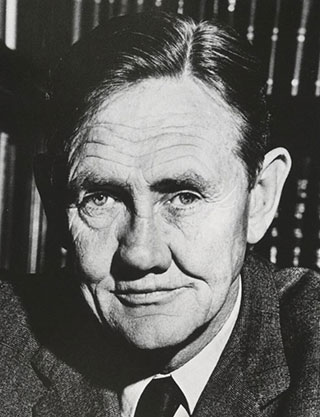
John Gorton

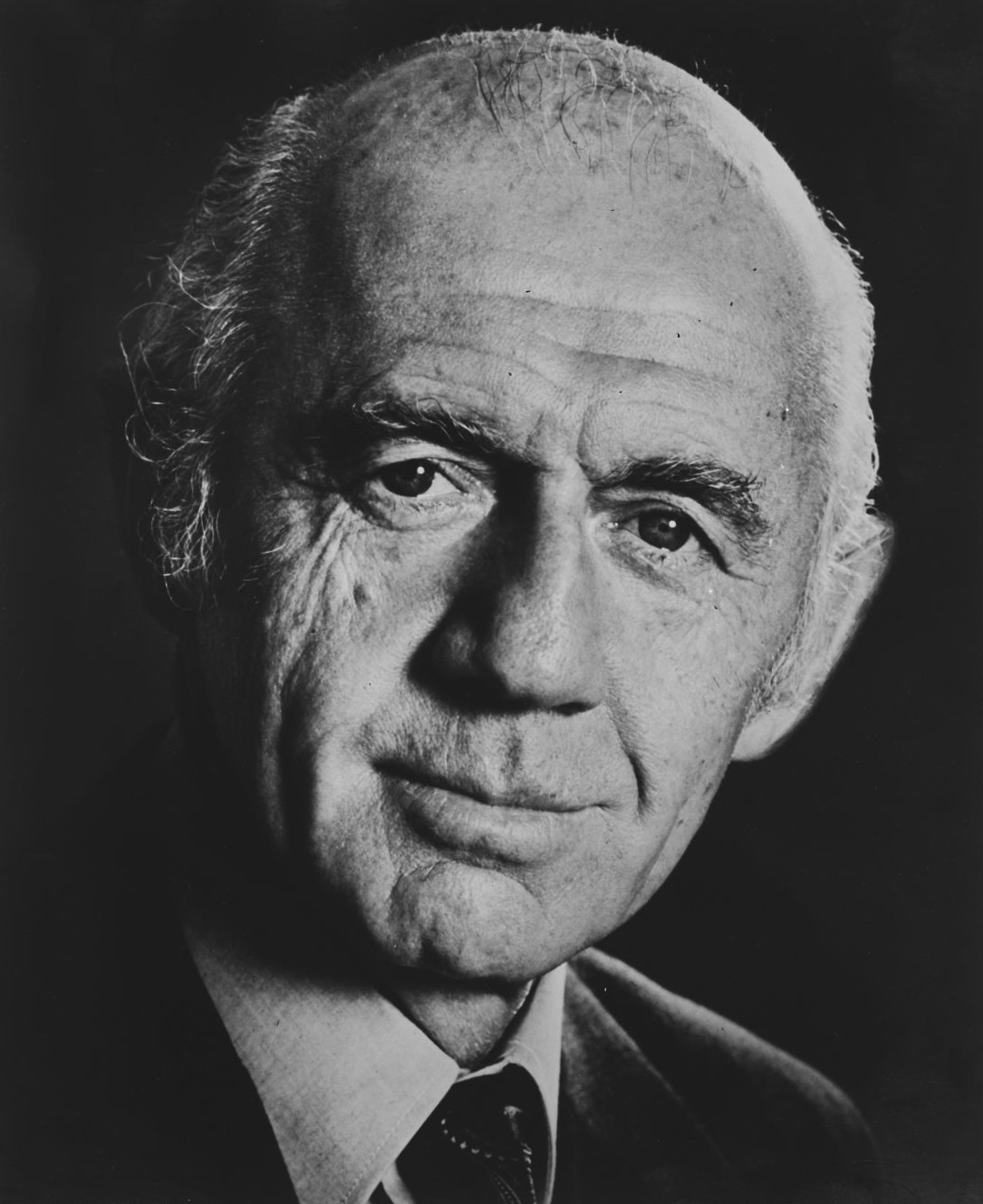
William McMahon

- Monarch – Elizabeth II
- Governor-General – Sir Paul Hasluck
- Prime Minister – John Gorton (until 10 March), then William McMahon
  - Deputy Prime Minister – John McEwen (until 5 February), then Doug Anthony
  - Opposition Leader – Gough Whitlam
- Chief Justice – Sir Garfield Barwick

=== State and territory leaders ===
- Premier of New South Wales – Robert Askin
  - Opposition Leader – Pat Hills
- Premier of Queensland – Joh Bjelke-Petersen
  - Opposition Leader – Jack Houston
- Premier of South Australia – Don Dunstan
  - Opposition Leader – Steele Hall
- Premier of Tasmania – Angus Bethune
  - Opposition Leader – Eric Reece
- Premier of Victoria – Sir Henry Bolte
  - Opposition Leader – Clyde Holding
- Premier of Western Australia – Sir David Brand (until 3 March), then John Tonkin
  - Opposition Leader – John Tonkin (until 3 March), then Sir David Brand

=== Governors and administrators ===
- Governor of New South Wales – Sir Roden Cutler
- Governor of Queensland – Sir Alan Mansfield
- Governor of South Australia – Major General Sir James William Harrison (until 16 September), then Sir Mark Oliphant (from 1 December)
- Governor of Tasmania – Lieutenant General Sir Edric Bastyan
- Governor of Victoria – Major General Sir Rohan Delacombe
- Governor of Western Australia – Major General Sir Douglas Kendrew
- Administrator of Norfolk Island – Robert Dalkin
- Administrator of the Northern Territory – Frederick Chaney
- Administrator of Papua and New Guinea – Les Johnson

== Events ==
- Neville Bonner becomes first Indigenous Australian to sit as a member in the Parliament of Australia
- Evonne Goolagong is named Australian of the Year.

=== January ===
- 3 January -
  - Sudden hailstorms lash the Sydney area causing widespread damage to houses and properties, as well as traffic chaos and nearly $150,000 worth of damage to fruit and vegetable crops at Cobbity.
  - New South Wales Transport Minister announces that intensified police weekend patrols might become a regular part of the campaign to cut the road toll after 8,148 New South Wales motorists were arrested or charged over the New Year holiday weekend.
- 4 January -
  - Federal Opposition Leader Gough Whitlam says in Port Moresby that Papuan leaders seem to accept completely the Australian Labor Party's timetable for independence of Papua New Guinea. The timetable provides for self-government as soon as a Labor government comes to power in Australia, and independence in 1976.
  - Immigration Minister Phillip Lynch gives a ruling that three Asian doctors at St Vincent's Hospital Sydney, who entered Australia under the private overseas student program, will be sent home, but may apply to return to Australia as migrants conditionally.

=== March ===
- 10 March - William McMahon replaces John Gorton as Prime Minister of Australia after a party room ballot on a motion of confidence in John Gorton as Prime Minister. The ballot was divided 33:33 until Mr. Gorton, as chairman, gave his casting vote against the motion, effectively voting himself out of office. He stood for and won the position of Deputy Party Leader, after William McMahon beat Billy Snedden for the leadership. Later, John Gorton publishes an article critical of Cabinet leaks.

=== July ===
- 24 July - Queensland Premier Joh Bjelke-Petersen declares a State of Emergency to allow the touring South African Springboks football team to play.

=== October ===
- 13 October - Enrolment, but not voting, is made compulsory for Aborigines and Torres Strait Islanders in Queensland.

=== November ===
- 2 November -
  - President Richard Nixon gives Prime Minister William McMahon an unqualified endorsement of the Anzus alliance, saying that the United States would honour its commitments under the alliance, which he described as one of America's fundamental pillars in the Pacific.
  - Sonia McMahon, wife of Prime Minister William McMahon, captures international attention when she wears a daring full-length dress, with a long slit down the sides revealing her legs, to a White House reception. The dress was designed by South Yarra fashion designer Victoria Ciscijo of Valencia House. Sonia McMahon would be most remembered in years to come for this dress.

=== December ===
- 24 December – Cyclone Althea hits Townsville and surrounding islands, killing 3
- Australia and New Zealand announce pullout of troops from Vietnam

=== Date unknown ===
- Plumbers and Gasfitters Employees Union Building, construction in Melbourne is completed.

== Arts and literature ==
- David Williamson writes The Removalists
- David Ireland's novel The Unknown Industrial Prisoner wins the Miles Franklin Award

== Film ==
- Walkabout
- Wake in Fright

== Television ==
- 4 January – American children's educational TV series Sesame Street premieres on ABC.
- 26 March – The Logie Awards of 1971 are held in Melbourne where Division 4's Gerard Kennedy and Maggie Tabberer from Maggie win the Gold Logies for being the most popular male and female personalities on Australian television. A special Gold Logie is also presented to Pick-A-Box hosts Bob and Dolly Dyer in recognition of their contribution to Australian television.
- 21 June – The final regular edition of Pick-A-Box, hosted by Bob and Dolly Dyer, airs for the final time. First broadcast as a radio program in 1948, a final special Pick-a-Box program showing highlights from previous years subsequently airs on 28 June.

== Sport ==
- 18 September – South Sydney defeated St. George 16–10 in the NSWRL Grand Final at the Sydney Cricket Ground; thus winning four premierships in five years and their 20th overall. It would become their final premiership win until 2014.
- 25 September – Hawthorn defeated St. Kilda 12.10 (82) to 11.9 (75) in the VFL Grand Final at the Melbourne Cricket Ground; thus winning their second senior premiership.
- 25 September – Derek Clayton wins his third men's national marathon title, clocking 2:11:08.8 in Hobart.
- Silver Knight wins the Melbourne Cup
- South Australia wins the Sheffield Shield
- Kialoa takes line honours in the Sydney to Hobart Yacht Race. Pathfinder takes handicap honours
- 1971 South Africa rugby union tour of Australia

== Births ==
- 17 January – Peter Winter, track and field decathlete
- 25 January – Brett Aitken, track cyclist
- 26 January – Lee Naylor, track and field athlete
- 14 February – Lisa-Marie Vizaniari, discus thrower
- 19 February
  - Lisa McCune, actress and singer
  - Richard Green, golfer
- 20 March – Murray Bartlett, actor
- 26 March – Rennae Stubbs, tennis player
- 1 April – Lachy Hulme, actor and screenwriter
- 2 April – Todd Woodbridge, tennis player
- 20 April
  - John Senden, golfer
  - Grant Smith, field hockey player
- 1 May – Stuart Appleby, golfer
- 4 May – Miles Stewart, triathlete
- 7 May – Billy Moore, Australian rugby league player
- 17 May
  - Mark Connors, rugby union player
  - Shaun Hart, footballer, coach, and sportscaster
- 27 May – Wayne Carey, Australian rules footballer
- 3 June – Mary Grigson, cyclist
- 10 June
  - Kyle Sandilands, DJ, Australian Idol judge and TV presenter.
- 21 June
  - Jason Costigan, politician and rugby league commentator.
- 3 July - Julian Assange, activist
- 12 July – Robert Allenby, golfer
- 28 August – Daniel Goddard, actor and model
- 2 September – Gregory Corbitt, field hockey striker
- 18 September
  - Kate Starre, field hockey midfielder
  - Kevin Campion, rugby league player
- 1 October – Andrew O'Keefe, highest-rating television personality
- 20 October – Dannii Minogue, singer, actress and television personality
- 29 October – Matthew Hayden, cricket player
- 10 November - Monique Allen, gymnast
- 14 November
  - Adam Gilchrist, cricket player
  - John Barilaro, politician, 18th Deputy Premier of New South Wales
- 19 November – Michelle Andrews, field hockey midfielder
- 6 December – Brendan Garard, field hockey player
- date unknown – Janine Deakin, geneticist

== Deaths ==
- 9 February – Arthur Smith (b. 1893), public servant
- 16 March – Chuck Fleetwood-Smith (b. 1908), cricketer
- 27 May – Chips Rafferty (b. 1909), actor
- 30 June – Kenneth Slessor (b. 1901), poet
- 3 August – Beatrice Kerr (b. 1887), swimmer, diver, and aquatic performer
- 11 August – Sir John Burton Cleland (b. 1878), naturalist, microbiologist, mycologist and ornithologist
- 14 August – Jack Cato (b. 1889), photographer
- 19 August – Jack Emanuel (b. 1918), George Cross recipient
- 16 October – Robin Boyd (b. 1919), architect
- 26 October – Hedwig Ross (d. 1900), New Zealand-born political activist
