= 1968 in Australia =

- Monarch: Elizabeth II
- Governor-General: Lord Casey
- Prime minister: John McEwen, then John Gorton
- Population: 11,799,078
- Australian of the Year: Lionel Rose
- Elections: NSW, SA, WA

The following lists events that happened during 1968 in Australia.

- Decades: 1940s; 1950s; 1960s; 1970s; 1980s
- See also: 1968 in Australian literature; Other events of 1968; Timeline of Australian history

== Incumbents ==
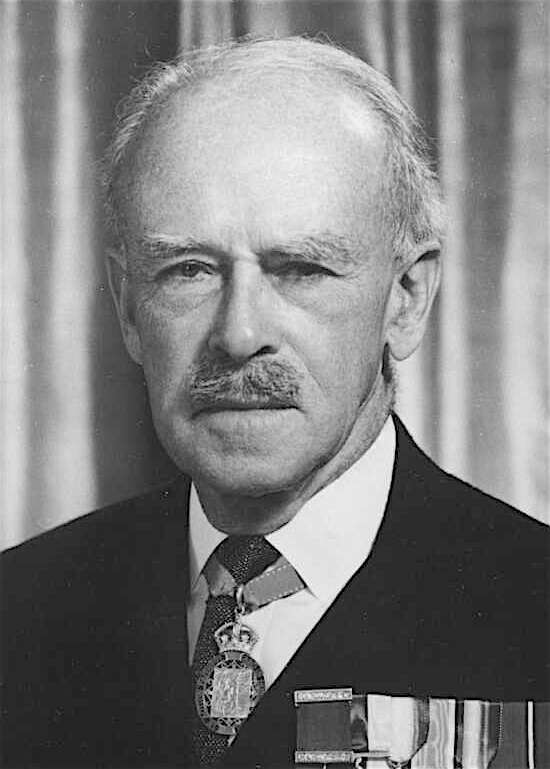
Lord Casey

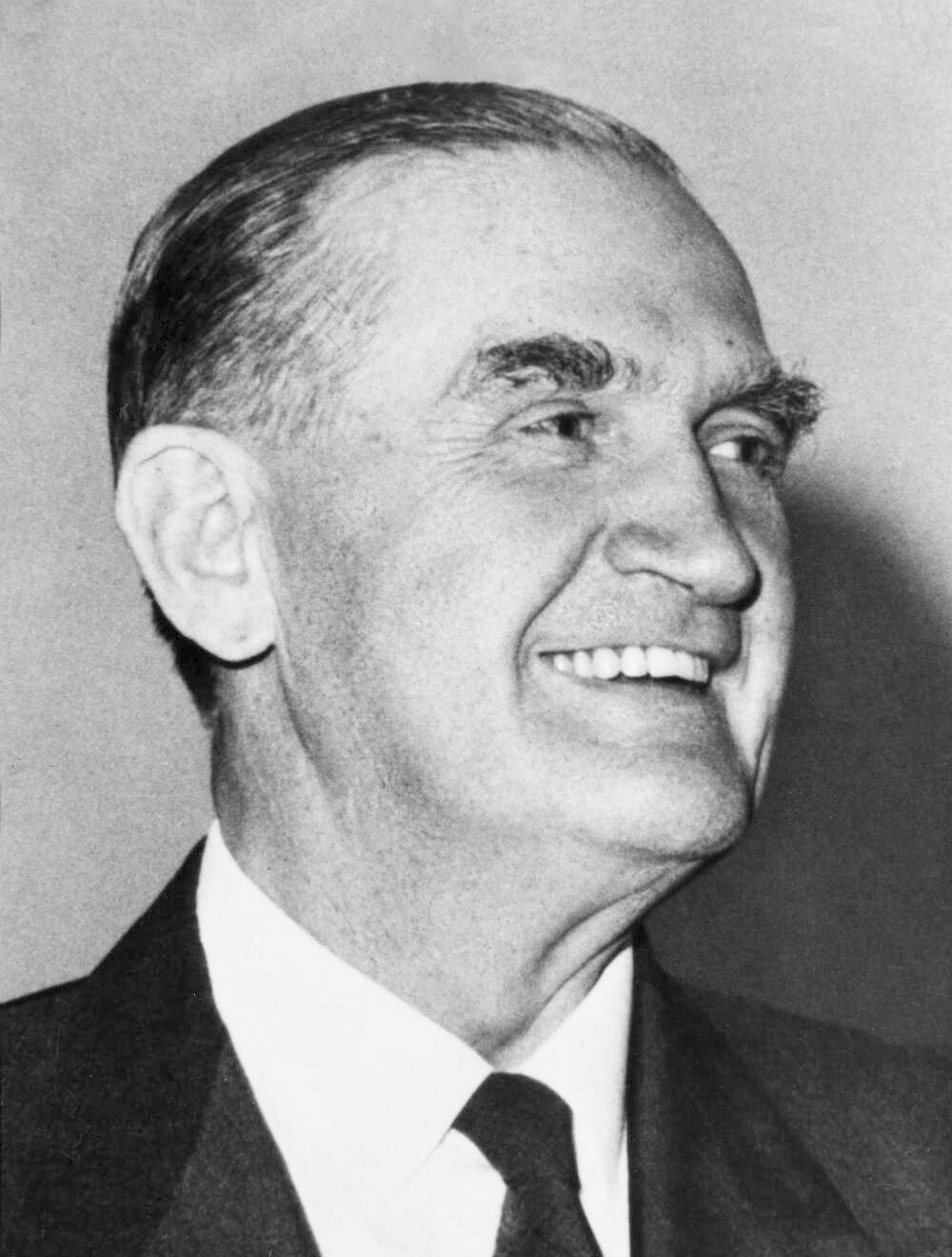
John McEwen

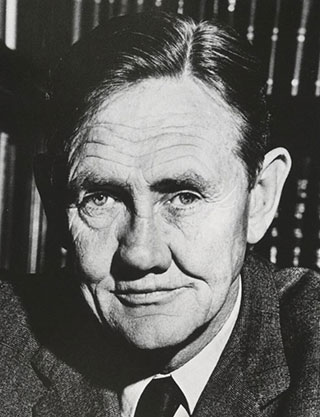
John Gorton

- Monarch – Elizabeth II
- Governor-General – Lord Casey
- Prime Minister – John McEwen (until 10 January), then John Gorton
  - Deputy Prime Minister – John McEwen (from 10 January)
  - Opposition Leader – Gough Whitlam
- Chief Justice – Sir Garfield Barwick

=== State and territory leaders ===
- Premier of New South Wales – Robert Askin
  - Opposition Leader – Jack Renshaw (until 2 December), then Pat Hills
- Premier of Queensland – Frank Nicklin (until 17 January), then Jack Pizzey (until 31 July), then Gordon Chalk (from 1 August until 8 August), then Joh Bjelke-Petersen
  - Opposition Leader – Jack Houston
- Premier of South Australia – Don Dunstan (until 17 April), then Steele Hall
  - Opposition Leader – Steele Hall (until 17 April), then Don Dunstan
- Premier of Tasmania – Eric Reece
  - Opposition Leader – Angus Bethune
- Premier of Victoria – Sir Henry Bolte
  - Opposition Leader – Clyde Holding
- Premier of Western Australia – David Brand
  - Opposition Leader – John Tonkin

=== Governors and administrators ===
- Governor of New South Wales – Sir Roden Cutler
- Governor of Queensland – Sir Alan Mansfield
- Governor of South Australia – Lieutenant General Sir Edric Bastyan (until 1 June), then Major General Sir James Harrison (from 4 December)
- Governor of Tasmania – General Sir Charles Gairdner (until 11 July), then Lieutenant General Sir Edric Bastyan (from 2 December)
- Governor of Victoria – Major General Sir Rohan Delacombe
- Governor of Western Australia – Major General Sir Douglas Kendrew
- Administrator of Nauru – Leslie King (until 30 January)
- Administrator of Norfolk Island – Reginald Marsh (until June), then Robert Dalkin (from July)
- Administrator of the Northern Territory – Roger Dean
- Administrator of Papua and New Guinea – David Hay

== Events ==
- 4 January – The search for the body of Prime Minister Harold Holt, who disappeared whilst swimming near Portsea, Victoria, is called off.
- 10 January – John Gorton is sworn in as Prime Minister of Australia after the disappearance of Harold Holt.
- 28 January – Members of English rock groups The Who and Small Faces are escorted by police from a plane at Melbourne's Essendon Airport, after the pilot diverts the flight citing the bands' behaviour.
- 31 January – The Australian-administered United Nations trust territory of Nauru became independent, in accordance with the provisions of the Nauru Independence Act 1967.
- 1 April – American evangelist Billy Graham begins a tour of Australia.
- 8 April – Fluoridation of Sydney's water supply begins.
- 17 April – A state election is held in South Australia. Steele Hall (Liberal and Country League) defeats Don Dunstan (ALP), and becomes Premier of South Australia.
- 30 April – Jim Cairns unsuccessfully challenges Gough Whitlam for leadership of the Australian Labor Party.
- 1 May – The Duke of Edinburgh arrives in Australia for a ten-day visit.
- 5 May – Three Australian journalists are killed by the Viet Cong in Saigon.
- 19 May – The body of 3-year-old boy Simon Brook is found after he is murdered near his home in the Sydney suburb of Glebe. As of 2025, no person has ever been charged with Brook's murder but his parents allege convicted child killer Derek Percy, who died in 2013, was responsible.
- 21 May – Indian Prime Minister Indira Gandhi visits Australia.
- 14 June – Journalist Simon Townsend, future host of Simon Townsend's Wonder World, is granted exemption from military service after lodging a fifth appeal against his imprisonment and court martial for conscientious objection.
- 18 June – The first stage of the Warringah Freeway opens in Sydney.
- 24 June – British comedian Tony Hancock commits suicide in his Sydney hotel room.
- 2 July – Fifty students are arrested during an anti-Vietnam War protest in Martin Place, Sydney.
- 4 July – Forty five people are arrested during an anti-war protest outside the U.S. consulate in St Kilda Road, Melbourne.
- 31 July – The Premier of Queensland, Jack Pizzey, dies in office.
- 1 August – Jack Pizzey's deputy, Gordon Chalk, is sworn in as his successor until the appointment of Joh Bjelke-Petersen as Premier a week later.
- 3 August – The standard gauge rail line between Perth and Kalgoorlie is completed.
- 20 August – The National Gallery of Victoria is opened in Melbourne.
- 14 October – The town of Meckering, Western Australia, is badly damaged by an earthquake.
- 28 October – The Postmaster-General's Department decreases the number of mail deliveries per day from two to one.
- 31 October – Minister for the Army Phillip Lynch admits that Australian Army troops may have breached the Geneva Convention by using water torture during the interrogation of a female Viet Cong suspect.
- 1 November – The airline Ansett-ANA is renamed Ansett.
- 14 December – A referendum is held in Tasmania to allow the granting of Australia's first casino license to the Wrest Point Hotel. The referendum is passed.
- 31 December – MacRobertson Miller Airlines Flight 1750 crashes south of Port Hedland, Western Australia, killing all 26 people on board.

=== Non-specific dates ===
- Australia's population is estimated to have reached 12 million in 1968.

== Arts and literature ==
- 17 January – The Seekers are named Australians of the Year for 1967.
- 19 January – William Pidgeon wins the Archibald Prize with his portrait of Lloyd Rees.
- 1 July – The Copyright Act 1968 replaces the existing 1911 copyright legislation.
- Thomas Keneally's novel Three Cheers for the Paraclete wins the Miles Franklin Award

== Film ==
- 2 December – At the Australian Film Institute Awards ceremony, Prime Minister John Gorton announces the creation of the Australian Film Development Corporation.

== Television ==
- 25 May – An episode of the ABC series Bellbird stops the nation when the character of Charlie Cousins (played by Robin Ramsay) dies in a fall from a silo.

== Sport ==
- 26 February – Boxer Lionel Rose beats Japan's Fighting Harada in Tokyo to become world bantamweight champion.
- 25 May – Derek Clayton wins his second men's national marathon title, clocking 2:14:47.8 in Hobart.
- 26 May – Australia wins the 1968 Federation Cup in women's tennis, defeating the Netherlands (3–0).
- 10 June – Australia wins the 1968 Rugby League World Cup when it beats France (20–2) in the final at the SCG.
- 21 September – South Sydney defeated Manly-Warringah 13–9 in the NSWRL Grand Final at the Sydney Cricket Ground. Newtown finish in last position, claiming the wooden spoon.
- 28 September – The Carlton Blues narrowly beat Essendon Bombers by 3 points (56–53) in the grand final of the 1968 VFL season, winning their first flag in 21 years.
- 12 – 27 October – Australia participates in the 1968 Summer Olympics in Mexico City, coming ninth in the medal tally with 5 gold, 7 silver and 5 bronze medals (17 in total).
- 15 October – Ralph Doubell equals Peter Snell's world record (2:04.3) in the men's 800 metres, clocking 1:44.3 at the Summer Olympics in Mexico City.
- 5 November – Rain Lover wins the Melbourne Cup.
- 26 December – Ondine II takes line honours in the Sydney to Hobart Yacht Race. Koomooloo is the handicap winner

=== Unknown dates ===
- Western Australia wins the Sheffield Shield.

== Births ==
- 9 January – Mardi Lunn, golfer
- 7 February – Phillip Tahmindjis, ice speed skater
- 12 February – Nathan Rees, 41st Premier of New South Wales (2008–2009)
- 1 April – Mike Baird, 44th Premier of New South Wales (2014–2017)
- 7 April – Duncan Armstrong, swimmer
- 20 April – Julia Morris, actress, comedian, television presenter and producer
- 13 May – Scott Morrison, 30th Prime Minister of Australia
- 26 May – Rachael Sporn, basketball player
- 28 May – Kylie Minogue, entertainer
- 1 June – Jason Donovan, entertainer
- 4 June – Rachel Griffiths, actress
- 15 June – Hugh McDermott, politician
- 27 July – Julian McMahon, actor (died 2025)
- 3 August – Tom Long, actor (died 2020)
- 8 August – Craig Ruddy, artist (died 2022)
- 9 August – Eric Bana, actor
- 10 August – Cate Shortland, film and television writer and director
- 20 August – Sandy Brondello, basketball player and coach
- 13 September – Andrew Gee, politician
- 17 September – Peter Anderson, cricketer
- 18 September – Brad Beven, triathlete
- 30 September – Sharon Jaklofsky, track and field athlete
- 8 October – Garry Hocking, footballer
- 12 October – Hugh Jackman, actor
- 15 October – Trent Zimmerman, politician
- 5 November – Penny Wong, politician, Minister for Foreign Affairs
- 13 November – Cherie Burton, politician
- 10 December – Barry Urban, politician (died 2025)
- 19 December – Kristina Keneally, 42nd Premier of New South Wales (2009–2011)

== Deaths ==
- 14 January – Dorothea Mackellar (born 1885), poet
- 21 February – Howard Florey (born 1898), Nobel Prize-winning pharmacologist
- 22 May – Arthur Bridges (born 1901), New South Wales Minister for Child and Social Welfare
- 24 June – Tony Hancock (born 1924), British comedian
- 31 July – Jack Pizzey (born 1911), Premier of Queensland
- 19 August – William McCall (born 1908), politician
- 25 August – Stan McCabe (born 1910), cricketer
- 28 September – Sir Norman Brookes (born 1877), tennis player
- 10 October
  - Trevor Housley (born 1910), public servant
  - Gavin Long (born 1901), journalist and military historian
- 13 October – Dame Jean Macnamara (born 1899), medical scientist
- 27 October – James Hunter (born 1882), politician
- 14 December – Margaret Theadora Allan (born 1889), community worker
- 20 December – John Jennings (born 1878), politician

== See also ==
- List of Australian films of the 1960s
