= 1969 in Australia =

- Monarch: Elizabeth II
- Governor-General: Lord Casey, then Sir Paul Hasluck
- Prime minister: John Gorton
- Population: 12,008,635
- Australian of the Year: Lord Casey
- Elections: Tas, Qld, Federal

The following lists events that happened during 1969 in Australia.

- Decades: 1940s; 1950s; 1960s; 1970s; 1980s
- See also: 1969 in Australian literature; Other events of 1969; Federal election; Timeline of Australian history

== Incumbents ==
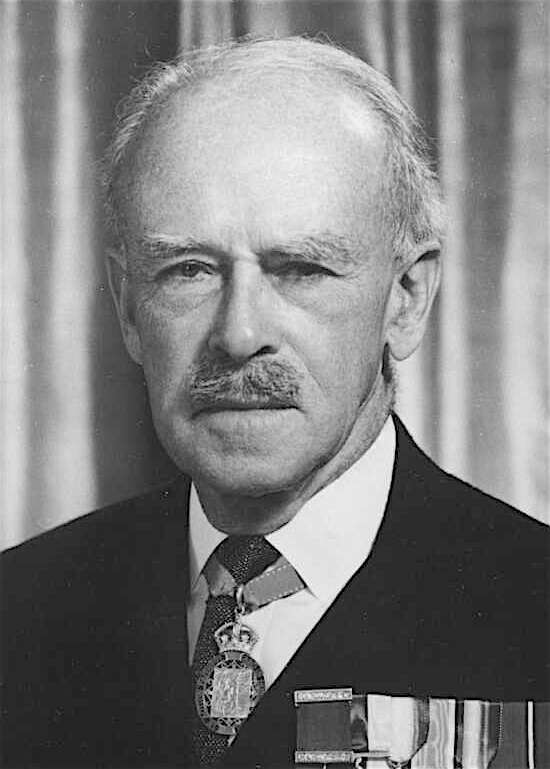
Lord Casey

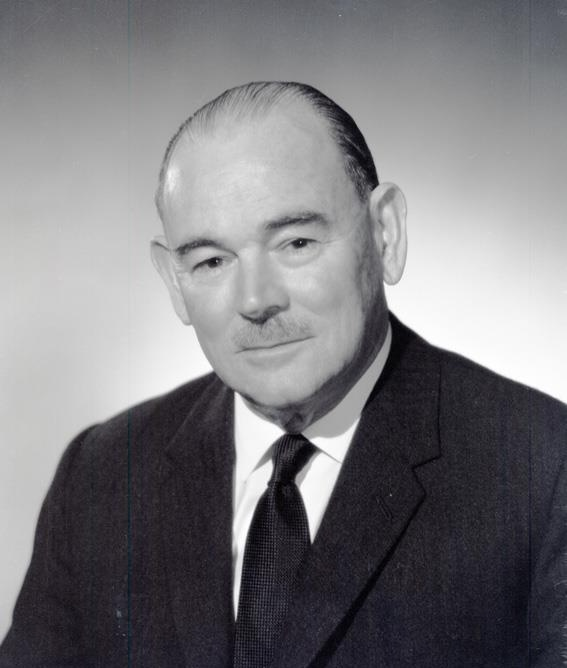
Sir Paul Hasluck

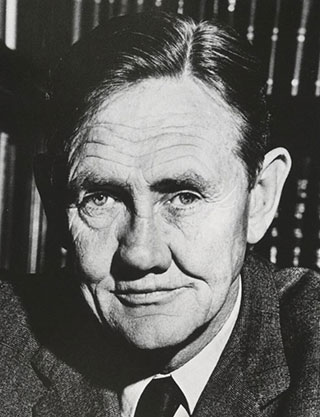
John Gorton

- Monarch – Elizabeth II
- Governor-General – Lord Casey (until 30 April), then Sir Paul Hasluck
- Prime Minister – John Gorton
  - Deputy Prime Minister – John McEwen
  - Opposition Leader – Gough Whitlam
- Chief Justice – Sir Garfield Barwick

=== State and territory leaders ===
- Premier of New South Wales – Robert Askin
  - Opposition Leader – Pat Hills
- Premier of Queensland – Joh Bjelke-Petersen
  - Opposition Leader – Jack Houston
- Premier of South Australia – Steele Hall
  - Opposition Leader – Don Dunstan
- Premier of Tasmania – Eric Reece (until 26 May), then Angus Bethune
  - Opposition Leader – Angus Bethune (until 26 May), then Eric Reece
- Premier of Victoria – Sir Henry Bolte
  - Opposition Leader – Clyde Holding
- Premier of Western Australia – (Sir) David Brand
  - Opposition Leader – John Tonkin

=== Governors and administrators ===
- Governor of New South Wales – Sir Roden Cutler
- Governor of Queensland – Sir Alan Mansfield
- Governor of South Australia – Major General Sir James Harrison
- Governor of Tasmania – Lieutenant General Sir Edric Bastyan
- Governor of Victoria – Major General Sir Rohan Delacombe
- Governor of Western Australia – Major General Sir Douglas Kendrew
- Administrator of Norfolk Island – Robert Dalkin
- Administrator of the Northern Territory – Roger Dean
- Administrator of Papua and New Guinea – David Hay

== Events ==
- 8 January - Bushfires across Victoria claim the lives of 23 people including 17 who died when a grass fire overran a group of cars on the Princes Highway at Lara, near Geelong in Victoria. About 280 fires in total burned 250,000 hectares, destroyed 230 homes and dozens of other buildings, killing 12,000 head of stock.
- 7 February – The Violet Town railway disaster: the Southern Aurora passenger train collides head-on with a freight train. Nine people are killed.
- 13 April – Trams in Brisbane (Queensland) end service after 84 years of operation.
- 30 April – Sir Paul Hasluck becomes Governor-General of Australia after the retirement of Lord Casey.
- 10 May – The 1969 Tasmanian election is held, resulting in a hung parliament with the Australian Labor Party and Liberals winning 17 seats each. The deadlock is broken when Kevin Lyons of the Centre Party forms a coalition government with the Liberals and becomes Deputy Premier under Angus Bethune.
- 12 May – The Age newspaper in Melbourne begins the process of moving from Collins Street to Spencer Street. The move is completed on 6 October.
- 3 June – Melbourne-Evans collision – The Royal Australian Navy aircraft carrier HMAS Melbourne collides with the United States Navy destroyer USS Frank E. Evans in the South China Sea. Frank E. Evans is cut in half and sinks, killing 74 crew.
- 19 June – The Commonwealth Conciliation and Arbitration Commission rules that equal pay for women doing the same work as men must be phased in by 1972.
- 25 August – The MV Noongah sinks off the Mid North Coast near South West Rocks while enroute from Newcastle to Townsville killing 21 people.
- 26 September – The Poseidon bubble begins when the small mining company Poseidon NL discovers a large nickel deposit in Laverton, Western Australia.
- 25 October – 1969 Australian federal election: The Coalition Gorton government is narrowly re-elected with a sharply reduced majority, defeating a resurgent Labor Party led by Gough Whitlam.
- 7 November – A Liberal Party leadership spill is held, with Prime Minister Gorton re-elected as party leader over challengers William McMahon and David Fairbairn.
- 11 November – Prime Minister Gorton makes the most sweeping changes to the Federal Ministry since the Liberal-Country Party Coalition took office in 1949. Seven back-benchers are promoted to the junior ministry, four junior ministers promoted to cabinet, and three ministers dropped altogether. Treasurer McMahon was moved to External Affairs, and replaced by Les Bury. Future prime minister Malcolm Fraser was promoted to Minister for Defence.
- 13 November - Former Minister for Air, Dudley Erwin, expresses to journalists his belief that Prime Minister Gorton's young secretary, Ainsley Gotto, was responsible for him being dropped from his ministerial position. Erwin also asserted Gotto severely restricted access to Gorton which he and other ministers had previously enjoyed. When asked what political manoeuvre had been used to get him out of office, he replied "it's shapely, it wiggles, it's cold-blooded and its name is Ainsley Gotto".
  - Victorian SEC workers strike for 24 hours from midnight for the fourth time this year, causing widespread disruption to power supplies.
- 29 November – The rebuilding of the Sydney-Perth rail corridor to standard gauge is completed.
- 16 December – Prime Minister John Gorton announces that a withdrawal of Australian Army troops from the Vietnam War would begin in 1970.

== Science and technology ==
- 20 July – NASA switches the main transmission feed of the Apollo 11 Moon landing to Honeysuckle Creek Tracking Station in Canberra, then Parkes Observatory in New South Wales, which then broadcasts the mission to the world.

== Arts and literature ==
- 4 May – An Australian production of the rock musical Hair opens in Sydney. Produced by Harry M. Miller, it features the debut of young American singer Marcia Hines.
- George Johnston's novel Clean Straw for Nothing wins the Miles Franklin Award

== Film ==
- 27 March – 2000 Weeks (directed by Tim Burstall) is released. The film was one of the first features of the modern era in Australian cinema, although it was received poorly both critically and commercially.

== Television ==
- 5 March – The last episode of spy series Hunter is aired.
- 11 March – Police procedural drama series Division 4 makes its debut on the Nine Network.
- 21 March – Graham Kennedy wins the Gold Logie for In Melbourne Tonight.

== Sport ==
- 21 January – Boxer Johnny Famechon becomes world featherweight champion, when he defeats Cuban Jose Legra in a bout at the Albert Hall in London.
- 12 April – Carlton achieve the first double-century VFL score when they kick 30.30 (210) against Hawthorn, beating a previous record from 1931.
- 6 September – Richmond sets a new record VFL finals winning margin when it beats Geelong by 118 points. it is the first century winning margin in a finals match and beats the previous record margin of 88 points by Melbourne against Collingwood in the 1964 Second Semi.
- 20 September – Balmain defeated South Sydney 11–2 in the NSWRL Rugby League Grand Final at the Sydney Cricket Ground. It is Balmain's first premiership win since 1947, and would become their final win as the Balmain Tigers; they would later win in 2005 after their merger with the Western Suburbs Magpies to form the Wests Tigers. Cronulla-Sutherland finish in last position, claiming the wooden spoon.
- 27 September – Richmond 12.13 (85) beats Carlton 8.12 (60) for its seventh premiership.
- 2 October – Tennis player Rod Laver beats fellow Australian Tony Roche in the men's singles final of the U.S. Open, achieving his second Grand Slam (having also won the Australian Open, the French Open and Wimbledon in that year).
- 11 October – John Farrington wins his first men's national marathon title, clocking 2:21:02.8 in Sydney.
- 4 November – Rain Lover wins the Melbourne Cup.

== Births ==
- 19 January – Luc Longley, basketball player
- 22 January – Shelley Sandie, basketball player
- 23 January – Danielle Woodhouse, water polo player
- 7 February – Fiona Robinson, basketball and handball player
- 1 March – Tony Modra, Australian Rules football player
- 15 March – Matthew Morris, politician (d. 2020)
- 17 March – Alison Forman, football (soccer) midfielder
- 28 March – John Brogden, politician
- 1 April – Andrew Vlahov, basketball player
- 3 April – Ben Mendelsohn, actor
- 7 May – Rachael Robertson (writer), speaker, author and mentor
- 14 May – Cate Blanchett, actress
- 17 May – Liesl Tesch, wheelchair basketball player, sailor and politician
- 31 May – Juliet Haslam, field hockey defender
- 3 June – Dean Pay, Australian rugby league player
- 30 June – Mark Garner, track and field sprinter
- 7 July – Rina Bradshaw-Hill, triathlete
- 17 July – Jason Clarke, Australian actor
- 30 July – Simon Baker, actor
- 9 August – Ricky Cooke, racewalker
- 15 August – Bernard Fanning, singer
- 16 August – Jodi McKay, politician
- 29 August – Bill Granger, restaurateur (d. 2023)
- 6 September – Michellie Jones, triathlete
- 7 September – David Borger, politician
- 9 September – Natasha Stott Despoja, politician
- 13 September – Shane Warne, cricketer (d. 2022)
- 19 September – Kostya Tszyu, boxer
- 15 October – Jamie Cox, cricketer
- 20 October – Laurie Daley, rugby league football commentator and former player
- 31 October – Kylie Kwong, chef and television presenter
- 6 November – Cory Bernardi, Conservative politician
- 14 December – Dave Nilsson, baseball player
- 14 December – Rob Oakeshott, politician
- 29 December – Andrew Cornwell, politician

== Deaths ==
- 29 January – Alfred McClelland (born 1886), politician
- 31 March – Ernest Wetherell, politician
- 14 May – Frederick Lane (born 1888), swimmer
- 3 August – Alexander Mair (born 1889), 26th Premier of New South Wales (1939–1941)
- 25 August – Robert Cosgrove (born 1894), 30th Premier of Tasmania (1939–1947, 1948–1958)
- 17 November – Sir Malcolm Barclay-Harvey (born 1890), 22nd Governor of South Australia (1939–1944)
- 21 November – Norman Lindsay (born 1879), artist
- 27 November – May Gibbs, (born 1877) children's author.
- 20 December – Sir Giles Chippindall, (born 1893), public servant

== See also ==
- List of Australian films of the 1960s
