= 1970 in Australia =

- Monarch: Elizabeth II
- Governor-General: Sir Paul Hasluck
- Prime minister: John Gorton
- Population: 12,263,014
- Australian of the Year: Norman Gilroy
- Elections: SA, VIC, Half-Senate

The following lists events that happened during 1970 in Australia.

- Decades: 1950s; 1960s; 1970s; 1980s; 1990s
- See also: 1970 in Australian literature; Other events of 1970; Timeline of Australian history

== Incumbents ==
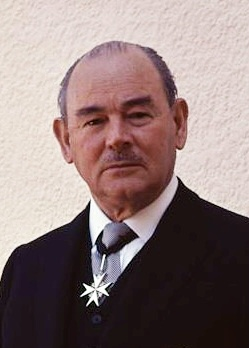
Sir Paul Hasluck

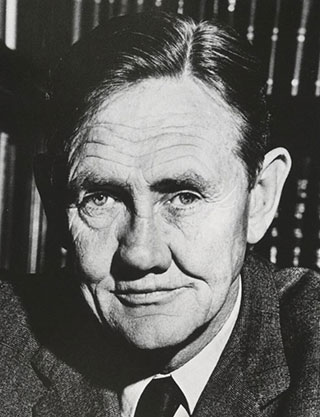
John Gorton

- Monarch – Elizabeth II
- Governor-General – Sir Paul Hasluck
- Prime Minister – John Gorton.
  - Deputy Prime Minister – John McEwen
  - Opposition Leader – Gough Whitlam
- Chief Justice – Sir Garfield Barwick

=== State and territory leaders ===
- Premier of New South Wales – Robert Askin
  - Opposition Leader – Pat Hills
- Premier of Queensland – Joh Bjelke-Petersen
  - Opposition Leader – Jack Houston
- Premier of South Australia – Steele Hall (until 2 June), then Don Dunstan
  - Opposition Leader – Don Dunstan (until 2 June), then Steele Hall
- Premier of Tasmania – Angus Bethune
  - Opposition Leader – Eric Reece
- Premier of Victoria – Sir Henry Bolte
  - Opposition Leader – Clyde Holding
- Premier of Western Australia – Sir David Brand
  - Opposition Leader – John Tonkin

=== Governors and administrators ===
- Governor of New South Wales – Sir Roden Cutler
- Governor of Queensland – Sir Alan Mansfield
- Governor of South Australia – Major General Sir James William Harrison
- Governor of Tasmania – Lieutenant General Sir Edric Bastyan
- Governor of Victoria – Major General Sir Rohan Delacombe
- Governor of Western Australia – Major General Sir Douglas Kendrew
- Administrator of Norfolk Island – Robert Dalkin
- Administrator of the Northern Territory – Roger Dean (until 4 March), then Frederick Chaney
- Administrator of Papua and New Guinea – David Hay (until July), then Les Johnson

== Events ==
- 1 January – Newcastle, New South Wales suffers a fierce hailstorm.
- 1 January - Bulahdelah tornado passes through the Buladelah State Forest
- 3 January – Police in Liverpool, Sydney conduct a high speed car chase after Wally Mellish, a central figure in the July 1968 Glenfield siege.
- 4 January – The Victorian Government appoints William Kaye, QC to investigate allegations that some senior police officers took bribes from abortion care providers.
  - 1,000 New South Wales state powerhouse operators go on strike.
- 5 January – Federal Opposition Leader Gough Whitlam tells a meeting of Wewak Councillors in Port Moresby that the Territory House of Assembly was a "rubber stamp" for policies formulated in Canberra.
- 7 January – The U.S. seismic survey vessel Polaris catches fire at Port Adelaide, causing $750,000 worth of damage.
  - Federal Opposition Leader Gough Whitlam announces in Rabaul, Papua New Guinea that a New Guinean would be appointed as Administrator of the Territory immediately if Labor won the next election.
  - The Australian Wheatgrowers' Federation recommends a national wheat quota reduction for the 1970–71 season.
- 8 January – The Army Minister Andrew Peacock denies the statement made the previous day by senior Labor figure Jim Cairns that Australian officers in Vietnam had suggested to troops that they would be home by June.
  - Queensland Labor Senator George Georges rejects oil company assurances that drilling in the Great Barrier Reef area could be done in such away that the reef would be preserved in an untouched state.
- 12 January – Prime Minister John Gorton announces the number of cannons to be distributed and the locations of these cannons for the Captain Cook celebrations. New South Wales, Canberra and Queensland will each receive one of the six cannons jettisoned by Captain Cook from the Endeavour on the Great Barrier Reef in 1770.
  - National Development Minister Reg Swartz announces that an Australian team is in San Francisco drawing up specifications for Australia's first nuclear power station to be stationed at Jervis Bay.
  - Three-year-old Cheryl Grimmer vanishes from Fairy Meadow Beach near Wollongong.
- 13 January – US Vice-President Spiro Agnew arrives in Canberra. 14 are arrested during protests outside Parliament House over Mr. Agnew's visit on 14 January.
- 14 January – Prime Minister Gorton announces that Ampol Exploration Ltd. is not proceeding with its intention to drill for oil in the Great Barrier Reef pending a thorough examination of whether there might be damage to the reef.
- 15 January –
  - Brisbane is hit by a dust storm.
  - Sydney police receive a $10,000 ransom note for the return of missing three-year-old Cheryl Grimmer.
  - Canberra police investigate possibly dangerous chemicals thrown into the swimming pool of the Prime Minister's Lodge which appeared to be eating into the tiled walls of the pool in which Prime Minister Gorton swims every morning.
- 17 January – Cyclone Ada hits Central Queensland, killing 14.
- 19 January – Queensland Premier Joh Bjelke-Petersen agrees to a Commonwealth-State inquiry into oil-drilling on the Great Barrier Reef.
  - Prime Minister John Gorton announces that Federal Cabinet has accepted the recommendation of a Senate select committee for Australia to adopt the metric system of weights and measures.
  - The six Premiers unanimously agree in Adelaide to approach Prime Minister John Gorton with a long-range plan aimed at States levying their own income-tax.
- 21 January – A thunderstorm in Brisbane causes damage to 1,000 homes, widespread power blackouts and peak-hour traffic chaos.
  - Dick Klugman, Labor MP for Prospect, reveals that a middle-aged Ukrainian migrant, Mr. Bronislaw Chyrzynski, had been held in Long Bay Gaol for nearly four weeks because he could not speak English.
- 22 January – Seven men, including high-ranking Victorian police officers are named in connection with an alleged abortion protection racket at the Victorian Government's Board of Inquiry into allegations of police corruption over abortions.
  - Federal Cabinet reaches a final agreement on the introduction of common health fees acceptable to the Australian Medical Association.
  - Primary Industry Minister Doug Anthony announces at Casino that Australia has agreed to sell about 30,000 tons of meat – worth about $25 million- to Russia within the next six months.
- 18 February – The Queensland Country Party is defeated in the Albert by-election.
- 21 April – The Hutt River Province Principality is established.
- 3 May – A new international terminal is opened at Sydney Airport
- 30 May – The 1970 Australian Capital Territory by-election is held. Labor Kep Enderby wins the seat. Ted Cawthron who ran in the seat for the National Socialist Party of Australia becomes the first National Socialist in Australia to run for public office.
- 1 July – Melbourne Airport is officially opened.
- 15 October – A portion of the West Gate Bridge in Melbourne collapses, killing 35.
- 21 November – 1970 Australian Senate election: The Liberal/Country Coalition government led by Prime Minister John Gorton and the Labor Party led by Gough Whitlam each ended up with 26 seats; both suffering a swing against them. The Democratic Labor Party won an additional seat and held the balance of power in the Senate. To date, this was the last occasion where a Senate election was held without an accompanying House of Representatives election.
- Establishment of the Aboriginal Legal Service (NSW/ACT).
- Pope Paul VI visits Australia.
- Elizabeth II and other members of the royal family tour Australia.

== Arts and literature ==
- Germaine Greer publishes her book, The Female Eunuch.
- Eric Smith wins the Archibald Prize with his portrait Gruzman – Architect
- Frederick Bates wins the Wynne Prize for landscape with his painting Redfern – Southern Portal
- Dal Stivens's novel A Horse of Air wins the Miles Franklin Award

== Film ==
- The Naked Bunyip
- The Set
- Squeeze a Flower

== Sport ==
- 26 September – Carlton defeats Collingwood by 10 points in the VFL Grand Final. In other Australian rules football leagues Clarence defeated New Norfolk in the TFL, Sturt defeated Glenelg in the SANFL and it was South Fremantle defeating Perth in the WANFL.
- 19 September – The South Sydney Rabbitohs defeated Manly-Warringah Sea Eagles 23–12 in the NSWRL Grand Final at the Sydney Cricket Ground. Souths captain John Sattler played most of the game with a broken jaw. Parramatta finish in last position, claiming the wooden spoon.
- 26 September – John Farrington wins his second men's national marathon title, clocking 2:15:27 in Werribee.
- Baghdad Note wins the Melbourne Cup.
- Victoria wins the Sheffield Shield.
- Buccaneer takes line honours and Pacha wins on handicap in the Sydney to Hobart Yacht Race.
- The US yacht Intrepid defeats the Australian yacht Gretel II in the America's Cup.
- Australia defeats Germany 3–0 in the Federation Cup.
- Margaret Court becomes the second woman to win the Grand Slam of tennis.
- John Newcombe wins both the singles and doubles championships at Wimbledon.
- Johnny Famechon defeats Fighting Harada to retain the WBC featherweight championship.

== Births ==
- 5 January – Nigel Gaffey, rugby league player
- 8 January – Rachel Friend, actress
- 17 January – Craig Crawford, politician
- 24 January – Luke Egan, surfer
- 27 January – Bradley Clyde, rugby league footballer
- 9 February – Glenn McGrath, cricketer
- 10 February – Melissa Doyle, television personality
- 11 February – Troy Grant, politician
- 12 February – Marty Hunt, politician
- 16 February – Kimberley Kitching, politician (d. 2022)
- 25 February – Peter Lew, businessman
- 1 March – Joe Kelly, politician and nurse
- 4 April – Jason Stoltenberg, tennis player
- 19 April – Anthony Roberts, politician
- 11 May – Dean Capobianco, track and field sprinter
- 17 May – Jodie Rogers, diver
- 25 May – Danni Roche, field hockey player
- 1 June – Georgie Gardner, journalist and television host
- 3 June – Jamie Durie, television host, author, and landscaper
- 8 June – Stephen Renouf, rugby league footballer
- 11 June – David Elliott, politician
- 2 July – Matt McEachan, politician
- 4 July – Tony Vidmar, soccer player
- 8 July – Lisa Powell, field hockey forward
- 10 July – Adam Hills, comedian and television presenter
- 13 July – Sandon Stolle, tennis player
- 19 July – Ashley Paske, actor
- 26 July – Yvette D'Ath, politician
- 27 July – Luke Foley, politician
- 31 July – John Sidoti, politician
- 27 August – Andy Bichel, cricketer
- 3 September – Elisa Roberts, politician
- 4 September – Deni Hines, singer
- 15 September – Michael Usher, journalist
- 22 September – Gladys Berejiklian, New South Wales politician, 45th Premier of New South Wales
- 27 October – Gerard Reinmuth, architect
- 5 November – Gerard Rennick, politician
- 8 November – David Cervinski, soccer player (d. 2019)
- 17 November – Tania Zaetta, television personality
- 18 November – Peta Wilson, actress
- 21 November – Justin Langer, cricketer
- 23 November – Stirling Hinchliffe, politician
- 26 November – Dave Hughes, comedian
- 27 November – Jason Woodforth, politician
- 17 December – Lachlan Millar, politician

== Deaths ==
- 17 February – Sir John Jensen, 85, public servant
- 13 March – Dick Eve, 68, Olympic gold medallist diver (1924)
- 20 March – Arthur Corbett, 93, public servant
- 1 May – Nan Chauncy, 69, children's author
- 13 May – William Dobell, 70, artist and sculptor
- 21 May – Elliot Lovegood Grant Watson, 84, writer and anthropologist (born and died in the United Kingdom)
- 2 July – Jessie Street, 81, suffragette and feminist (born in British Raj)
- 14 August – Bede Fanning, 84, public servant
- 30 October – John Loder, 2nd Baron Wakehurst, 75, 29th Governor of New South Wales (born and died in the United Kingdom)
- 24 November – Tilly Devine, 70, underworld figure (born in the United Kingdom)
- 12 December – Doris Blackburn, 81, women's rights activist and politician
- 14 December – William Slim, 79, 13th Governor-General of Australia (born and died in the United Kingdom)
