= 1972 in Australia =

- Monarch: Elizabeth II
- Governor-General: Sir Paul Hasluck
- Prime minister: William McMahon, then Gough Whitlam
- Population: 13,067,265
- Australian of the Year: Shane Gould
- Elections: TAS, QLD, Federal

The following lists events that happened during 1972 in Australia.

- Decades: 1950s; 1960s; 1970s; 1980s; 1990s
- See also: 1972 in Australian literature; Other events of 1972; Federal election; Timeline of Australian history

== Incumbents ==
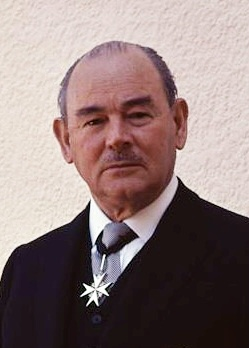
Sir Paul Hasluck

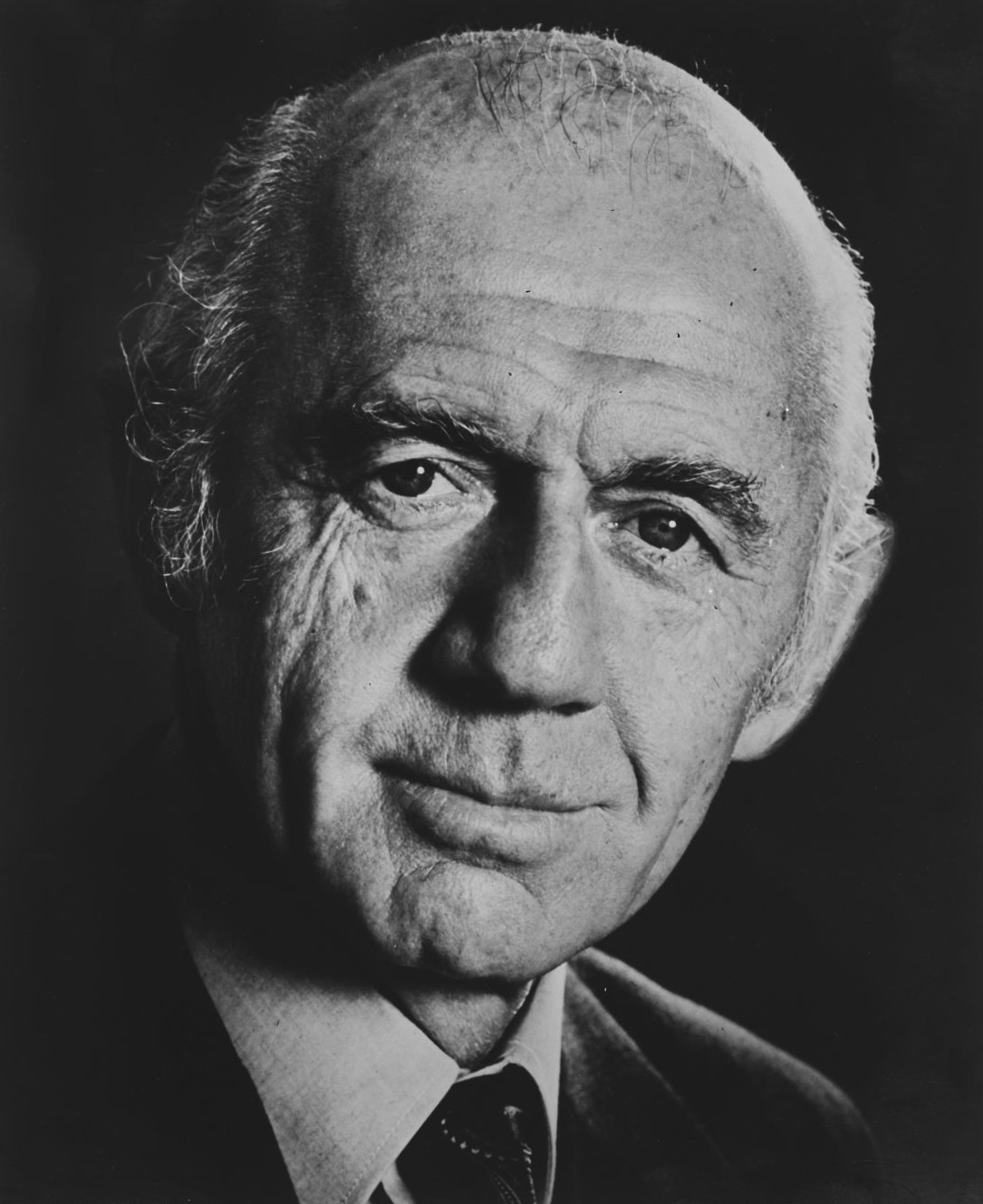
William McMahon

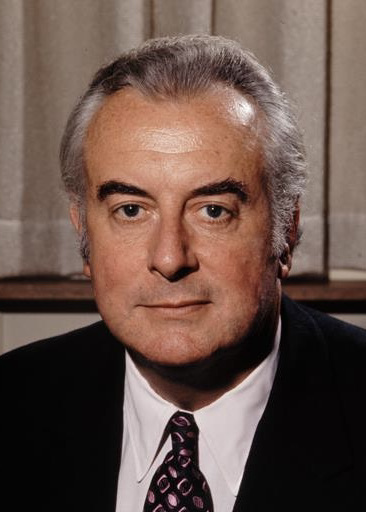
Gough Whitlam

- Monarch – Elizabeth II
- Governor-General – Sir Paul Hasluck
- Prime Minister – William McMahon (until 5 December), then Gough Whitlam
  - Deputy Prime Minister – Doug Anthony (until 5 December), then Lance Barnard
  - Opposition Leader – Gough Whitlam (until 5 December), then Billy Snedden (from 20 December)
- Chief Justice – Sir Garfield Barwick

=== State and territory leaders ===
- Premier of New South Wales – (Sir) Robert Askin
  - Opposition Leader – Pat Hills
- Premier of Queensland – Joh Bjelke-Petersen
  - Opposition Leader – Jack Houston
- Premier of South Australia – Don Dunstan
  - Opposition Leader – Steele Hall (until 15 March), then Bruce Eastick
- Premier of Tasmania – Angus Bethune (until 3 May), then Eric Reece
  - Opposition Leader – Eric Reece (until 3 May), then Max Bingham
- Premier of Victoria – Sir Henry Bolte (until 23 August), then Rupert Hamer
  - Opposition Leader – Clyde Holding
- Premier of Western Australia – John Tonkin
  - Opposition Leader – Sir David Brand (until 5 June), then Sir Charles Court

=== Governors and administrators ===
- Governor of New South Wales – Sir Roden Cutler
- Governor of Queensland – Sir Alan Mansfield (until 21 March), then Sir Colin Hannah
- Governor of South Australia – Sir Mark Oliphant
- Governor of Tasmania – Lieutenant General Sir Edric Bastyan
- Governor of Victoria – Major General Sir Rohan Delacombe
- Governor of Western Australia – Major General Sir Douglas Kendrew
- Administrator of Norfolk Island – Robert Dalkin (until August), then Edward Pickerd
- Administrator of the Northern Territory – Sir Frederick Chaney
- Administrator of Papua and New Guinea – Les Johnson

== Events ==
Shane Gould, Australian of the Year

- 26 January – Aboriginal Tent Embassy was constructed in front of Parliament House (now old Parliament House).
- 10 May – Law professor George Duncan is drowned in the Torrens River, Adelaide. Police establish that his death was a homophobic-related murder.
- 3 June – Douglas Nicholls becomes the first Indigenous Australian to be knighted.
- 29 July – Kerry Anne Wells earned Australia's first Miss Universe crown, in Dorado, Puerto Rico.
- 30 August - Three people are killed in the 1972 Taroom explosion when a burning truck loaded with ammonium nitrate explodes near Taroom, Queensland.
- 6 October – Faraday School kidnapping – six pupils and their teacher are kidnapped for $1 million ransom in Victoria.
- 15 November – First aircraft hijacking in Australia. Ansett Airlines Flight 232 from Adelaide to Alice Springs with 28 passengers and a crew of 4. Followed by gun battle at Alice Springs Airport.
- 1 December – Belinda Green is crowned Miss World in London, becoming the second Australian winner of this pageant. Australia won the two most important beauty contest in this year.
- 2 December – 1972 Australian federal election: The Labor Party led by Gough Whitlam defeats the Liberal/Country Coalition government led by Prime Minister William McMahon. Consequently, Whitlam becomes the first Labor Prime Minister of Australia since the defeat of Ben Chifley in 1949.
- Shane Gould is announced as Australian of the Year
- The health warning, "Smoking is a Health Hazard" becomes compulsory on cigarette packets in Australia.
- The Australian Workers' Union (AWU) abandons its support for the White Australia policy.

== Arts and literature ==
- Thea Astley's novel The Acolyte wins the Miles Franklin Award

== Film ==
- The Adventures of Barry McKenzie

== Television ==
- 18 February – The Logie Awards of 1972 are held in Melbourne where Division 4's Gerard Kennedy wins his second consecutive Gold Logie.
- 13 March – Controversial soap opera Number 96 debuts on the 0-10 Network.
- 16 November – The Aunty Jack Show premieres on ABC-TV in Sydney.

== Sport ==
- 16 September – Bernard Vine wins the men's national marathon title, clocking 2:28:21 in Richmond, Australia.
- Manly-Warringah defeated Eastern Suburbs 19–14 in the 1972 NSWRFL season Grand Final, claiming the first premiership win in the club's history. Parramatta finish in last position, claiming the wooden spoon.
- In the Bulimba Cup final Brisbane defeat Toowoomba 55–2 at Lang Park
- Piping Lane wins the Melbourne Cup
- Western Australia wins the Sheffield Shield
- American Eagle takes line and handicap honours in the Sydney to Hobart Yacht Race
- Shane Gould wins 3 gold medals for swimming at the 1972 Summer Olympics in Munich
- Australia draws Ashes Cricket Test Series 2–2 with England

== Births ==
- 2 January – Adam Elliot, animator and screenwriter
- 7 January – Shane Kelly, cyclist
- 16 January
  - Ang Christou, Australian rules footballer
  - Greg Page, musician, member of The Wiggles
- 21 January – Brett Mullins, rugby league player
- 1 February – Taryn Fiebig, opera and musical theatre soprano (died 2021)
- 5 February
  - Brad Fittler, rugby league footballer and coach
  - Queen Mary of Denmark
- 6 February – Mark Ladbrook, track and field sprinter
- 7 March – Simon Pryce, musician, member of The Wiggles
- 9 March – Spencer Howson, radio announcer
- 11 March – Adam Bandt, politician
- 25 March – Nina Bonner, field hockey goalkeeper
- 5 April – Paul Okon, soccer player
- 8 April – Katrina Powell, field hockey player
- 15 April – Glenn Butcher, politician
- 20 April – Mel Schilling, television personality (died 2026)
- 16 May – Adam Crouch, politician
- 20 May – Michael Diamond, professional target shooter
- 30 May – Renita Farrell, field hockey player
- 31 May – Sarah Murdoch, model, actress and television presenter
- 19 June – Poppy Montgomery, actress
- 22 June – Damien Oliver, jockey
- 24 June – Robbie McEwen, cyclist
- 24 June – Ian Rutledge, field hockey coach
- 30 June – Stuart Rendell, hammer thrower
- 6 July – Daniel Andrews, Premier of Victoria
- 14 July – Deborah Mailman, actress and singer
- 26 July – Nathan Buckley, Australian rules footballer
- 29 July – Boyd Exell, Australian carriage driving competitor
- 2 August – Jacinda Barrett, Australian actress
- 12 August – Allison Tranquilli, basketball player
- 1 September – Louise Dobson, field hockey player
- 19 September
  - Matt Cockbain, rugby player and coach
  - Ryan Girdler, rugby league player
- 20 September – Jenn Morris, field hockey player
- 11 October – Claudia Black, actress
- 1 November – Toni Collette, actress
- 7 November – Melissa Bell, actress
- 8 November – Kylie Shadbolt, artistic gymnast
- 13 November – Samantha Riley, swimmer
- 9 December – Annalise Braakensiek, model, actress, television presenter, businesswoman and activist (died 2019)
- 11 December – Del Kathryn Barton, artist
- 12 December – Quan Yeomans, musician, lead singer of Regurgitator
- 13 December – Chris Grant, Australian rules footballer
- 22 December – Anthony Edwards, rower
- 28 December – Patrick Rafter, tennis player

== Deaths ==
- 6 January – Olegas Truchanas (born 1923), conservationist and nature photographer
- 22 January – Jack Cummings (born 1901), tennis player
- 2 February – Matt Goggin (born 1936), Australian rules footballer (Geelong)
- 15 February – Sir Kenneth Street (born 1890), Chief Justice of New South Wales
- 29 February – Ernie Barber (born 1895), Australian rules footballer (South Melbourne)
- 9 March – Roy Kendall (born 1899), politician and MI6 officer
- 19 March –
  - George Bassett (born 1888), politician
  - Jack Carington Smith (born 1908), artist
- 16 April – Frank O'Connor (born 1894), public servant
- 2 May – Arthur Trebilcock (born 1907), Tasmanian cricketer
- 7 July – Sir Owen Dixon (born 1886), Chief Justice of Australia
- 21 August – Ernestine Hill (born 1899), author
- 23 September – Peter O'Sullivan (born 1932), Australian rules footballer (Essendon, North Melbourne)
- 31 October - Richard Norden (born 1948), soldier and police officer
- 4 November – Harry Rigby (born 1896), World War I flying ace
- 24 November – Sir Daniel McVey (born 1892), public servant
