= 1973 in Australia =

- Monarch: Elizabeth II
- Governor-General: Sir Paul Hasluck
- Prime minister: Gough Whitlam
- Population: 13,303,664
- Australian of the Year: Patrick White
- Elections: SA, VIC, NSW, Referendum

The following lists events that happened during 1973 in Australia.

- Decades: 1950s; 1960s; 1970s; 1980s; 1990s
- See also: 1973 in Australian literature; Other events of 1973; Timeline of Australian history

== Incumbents ==
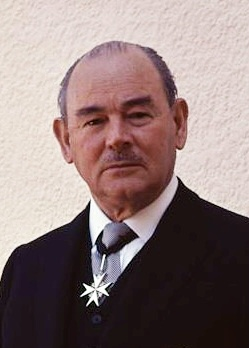
Sir Paul Hasluck

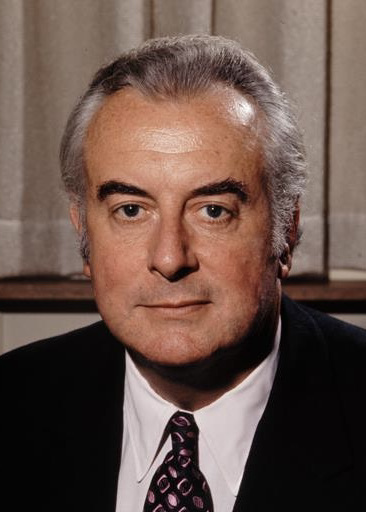
Gough Whitlam

- Monarch – Elizabeth II
- Governor-General – Sir Paul Hasluck
- Prime Minister – Gough Whitlam
  - Deputy Prime Minister – Lance Barnard
  - Opposition Leader – Billy Snedden
- Chief Justice – Sir Garfield Barwick

=== State and territory leaders ===
- Premier of New South Wales – Sir Robert Askin
  - Opposition Leader – Pat Hills (until 17 November), then Neville Wran
- Premier of Queensland – Joh Bjelke-Petersen
  - Opposition Leader – Jack Houston
- Premier of South Australia – Don Dunstan
  - Opposition Leader – Bruce Eastick
- Premier of Tasmania – Eric Reece
  - Opposition Leader – Max Bingham
- Premier of Victoria – Rupert Hamer
  - Opposition Leader – Clyde Holding
- Premier of Western Australia – John Tonkin
  - Opposition Leader – Sir Charles Court

=== Governors and administrators ===
- Governor of New South Wales – Sir Roden Cutler
- Governor of Queensland – Sir Colin Hannah
- Governor of South Australia – Sir Mark Oliphant
- Governor of Tasmania – Lieutenant General Sir Edric Bastyan (until 30 November), then Sir Stanley Burbury
- Governor of Victoria – Major General Sir Rohan Delacombe
- Governor of Western Australia – Major General Sir Douglas Kendrew
- Administrator of Norfolk Island – Edward Pickerd
- Administrator of the Northern Territory – Frederick Chaney (until 10 December), then Jock Nelson
- Administrator/High Commissioner of Papua New Guinea – Les Johnson

== Events ==
- 10 February – Australia's first casino, the Wrest Point Hotel Casino, opens in Hobart
- 28 February – The federal voting age is lowered from 21 to 18. The state of New South Wales had already enacted such a change in 1970.
- 2 March – Wellington Street bus station in Perth is opened by Western Australia's premier John Tonkin
- 8 March – Whiskey Au Go Go fire
- 1 June – The first General Dynamics F-111 aircraft is delivered to the Royal Australian Air Force
- 9 June – Disappearance of Jason Shannon
- 19 July – Lois D'Arcy was the first independent civil marriage celebrant ever appointed – by Attorney-General Lionel Murphy.
- 25 August - Disappearance of Joanne Ratcliffe and Kirste Gordon
- 9 October - The fifty-dollar note was introduced
- 20 October – Sydney Opera House officially opened by Elizabeth II
- 1 December – Papua New Guinea is granted self-government prior to independence
- 31 December – AC/DC perform their first major gig in Sydney.
- Removal of the "White Australia Policy".

== Arts and literature ==
- Patrick White is announced as Australian of the Year
- 21 September – The Jackson Pollock painting Blue Poles is controversially purchased by the Whitlam government for US$2 million (A$1.3 million).
- "No award" was made for the Miles Franklin Award

== Film ==
- Alvin Purple

== Television ==
- Certain Women (TV series) commences
- The novel Seven Little Australians adapted for television (10 part series)
- The New South Wales Rugby Football League negotiates its first television deal with the Australian Broadcasting Corporation.

== Sport ==
- 8 September – Derek Clayton wins his fourth men's national marathon title, clocking 2:12:07.6 in Perth.
- 15 September – Manly-Warringah defeated Cronulla-Sutherland 10–7 in the 1973 NSWRFL season Grand Final, claiming their second straight premiership. Penrith finish in last position, claiming the wooden spoon.
- Gala Supreme wins the Melbourne Cup
- Western Australia wins the Sheffield Shield
- Helsall takes line honours in the Sydney to Hobart Yacht Race. Ceil III is the handicap winner
- Australia defeats South Africa 3–0 in the Federation Cup

== Births ==
- 8 January – Jason Stevens, rugby league player and sportscaster
- 17 January – Chris Bowen, politician
- 22 January – Abi Tucker, actor and singer
- 31 January – Portia de Rossi, actress
- 4 February – James Hird, Australian footballer and coach
- 5 February – Luke Ricketson, rugby league player
- 15 February – Sarah Wynter, actress
- 16 February – Catherine Freeman, athlete
- 20 February – Kimberley Davies, actor
- 28 February – Rodger Corser, Actor
- 26 March – Matt Burke, rugby union footballer
- 13 April – Tammy Cole, field hockey defender
- 19 April – George Gregan, rugby union player
- 26 April – Stephanie Graf, middle distance athlete
- 29 May – Malcolm Allen, swimmer
- 12 June – Darryl White, Australian rules footballer
- 21 June – Alyson Annan, field hockey player
- 24 June – Matt Drummond, film director, screenwriter and visual effects supervisor
- 27 July – Gorden Tallis, rugby league footballer
- 2 August – Susie O'Neill, swimmer
- 14 August – Kieren Perkins, swimmer
- 20 August – Scott Goodman, swimmer
- 22 August – Mark Hickman, field hockey goalkeeper
- 2 September – Matthew Dunn, swimmer
- 5 September – Jennifer Whittle, basketball player
- 18 September – Louise Sauvage, wheelchair athlete
- 22 September – Craig McRae, footballer
- 8 October – Toby Haenen, swimmer
- 14 October – Steven Bradbury, speed skater
- 18 October – Stephen Allan, golfer
- 23 October – David Beard, volleyball player
- 31 October – Andrew Constance, politician
- 1 November – Peta Murphy, politician (d. 2023)
- 6 November – Greg Warren, politician
- 20 November
  - Sav Rocca, American football player and Australian rules footballer
  - Matthew Smith, field hockey player
- 4 December – Steve Menzies, rugby league footballer
- 24 December – Kerry Nettle, politician
- 28 December – Alex Dimitriades, actor
- (Date Unknown) – Ann Shoebridge, milliner

== Deaths ==
- 18 January – Beatrice Bligh, gardener (b. 1916)
- 5 April – John Coleman (born 1928), Australian rules footballer
- 21 April – Arthur Fadden (born 1894), former Prime Minister
- 8 July – Arthur Calwell (born 1896), politician
