= Peter Anderson =

Peter Anderson may refer to:

== Sportspeople ==
- Peter Anderson (cricketer, born 1933), Australian cricketer
- Peter Anderson (cricketer, born 1961), Australian cricketer
- Peter Anderson (cricketer, born 1968), Australian cricketer
- Peter Anderson (New Zealand cricketer) (1950–2012), New Zealand cricketer
- Peter Anderson (footballer, born 1932) (1932–2009), English former professional footballer for Plymouth Argyle and Torquay United
- Peter Anderson (footballer, born 1949), former English footballer and football manager
- Pete D. Anderson (1931–2013), horse trainer
- Peter Anderson (American football) (born 1963), American football player
- P. C. Anderson (1871–1955), educator and golfer in Western Australia

== Politicians ==
- Peter C. Anderson (fl. 1900s), Wisconsin politician
- Peter Anderson (politician) (born 1947), Australian politician

== Others ==
- Peter Anderson (artist) (1901–1984), American ceramist
- Peter Anderson (cinematographer) (born 1942), cinematographer and visual effects supervisor
- Peter Anderson (soldier) (1847–1907), Medal of Honor recipient
- Pete Anderson (born 1948), music producer
- Peter John Anderson (1853–1926), librarian and philatelist
- Peter Maltitz Anderson (1879–1954), South African mining engineer
- Peter Anderson (playwright) (born 1950), Canadian-American playwright and actor
- Peter Anderson (abolitionist) (1822–1879), African American rights activist, newspaper publisher
- Peter and Will Anderson (born 1987), identical twin American jazz musicians

== See also ==
- Per Andersen (1930–2020), Norwegian brain researcher
- Per Thomas Andersen (1954–2023), Norwegian literary historian and novelist
- Peter Andersson (disambiguation)
- Peter Andersen (disambiguation)
