= 1974 in Australia =

- Monarch: Elizabeth II
- Governor-General: Sir Paul Hasluck, then Sir John Kerr
- Prime minister: Gough Whitlam
- Population: 13,504,538
- Australian of the Year: Bernard Heinze
- Elections: Western Australia; Federal; Referendum; Northern Territory; Queensland

The following lists events that happened during 1974 in Australia.

- Decades: 1950s; 1960s; 1970s; 1980s; 1990s
- See also: 1974 in Australian television; 1974 in Australian literature; Other events of 1974; Federal election; Timeline of Australian history

== Incumbents ==
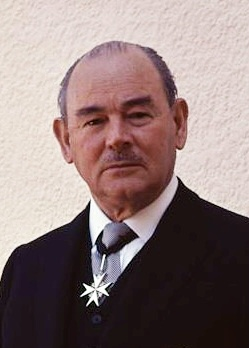
Sir Paul Hasluck

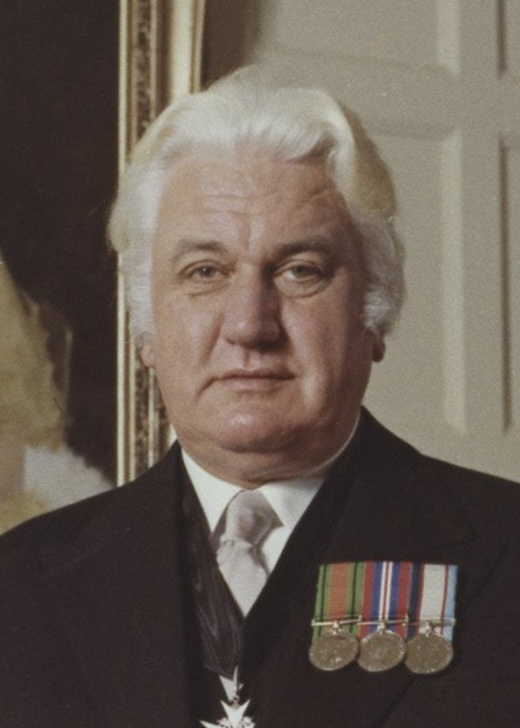
Sir John Kerr

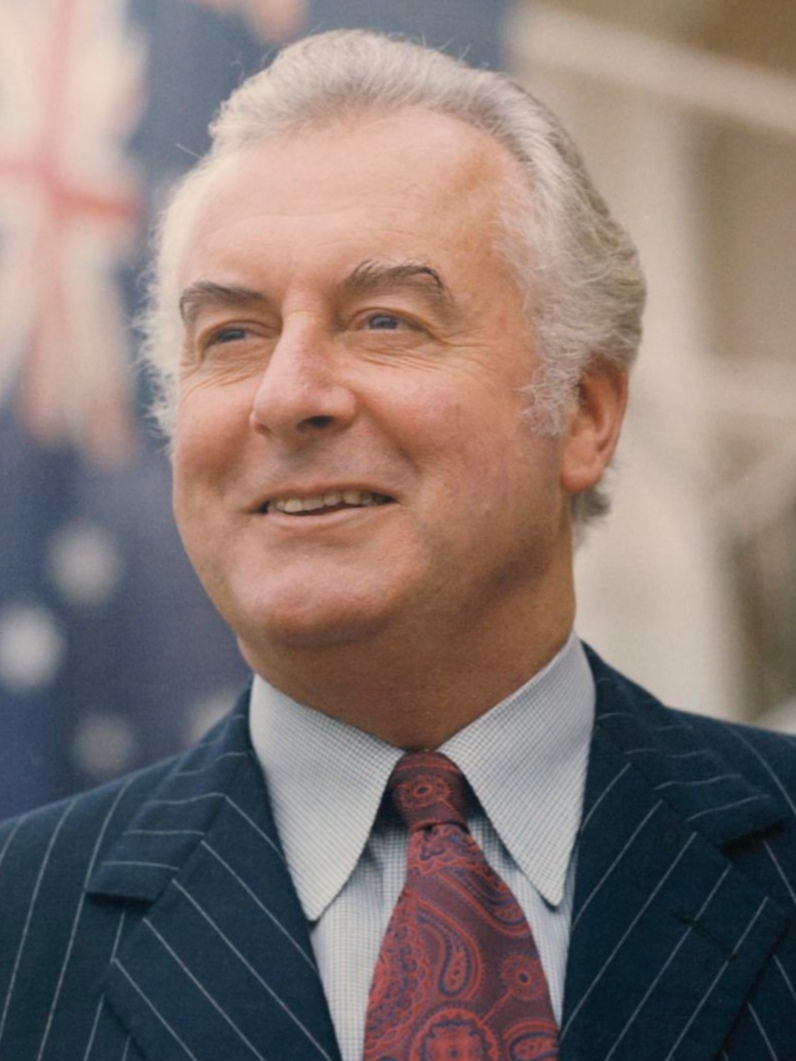
Gough Whitlam

- Monarch – Elizabeth II
- Governor-General – Sir Paul Hasluck (until 11 July), then Sir John Kerr
- Prime Minister – Gough Whitlam
  - Deputy Prime Minister – Lance Barnard (until 12 June), then Jim Cairns
  - Opposition Leader – Billy Snedden
- Chief Justice – Sir Garfield Barwick

=== State and territory leaders ===
- Premier of New South Wales – Sir Robert Askin
  - Opposition Leader – Neville Wran
- Premier of Queensland – Joh Bjelke-Petersen
  - Opposition Leader – Jack Houston (until 1 July), then Perc Tucker (until 7 December), then Tom Burns
- Premier of South Australia – Don Dunstan
  - Opposition Leader – Bruce Eastick
- Premier of Tasmania – Eric Reece
  - Opposition Leader – Max Bingham
- Premier of Victoria – Rupert Hamer
  - Opposition Leader – Clyde Holding
- Premier of Western Australia – John Tonkin (until 8 April), then Sir Charles Court
  - Opposition Leader – Sir Charles Court (until 8 April), then John Tonkin
- Majority Leader of the Northern Territory – Goff Letts (from 19 October)

=== Governors and administrators ===
- Governor of New South Wales – Sir Roden Cutler
- Governor of Queensland – Sir Colin Hannah
- Governor of South Australia – Sir Mark Oliphant
- Governor of Tasmania – Sir Stanley Burbury
- Governor of Victoria – Major General Sir Rohan Delacombe (until 24 May), then Sir Henry Winneke (from 1 June)
- Governor of Western Australia – Major General Sir Douglas Kendrew (until 6 January), then (Sir) Hughie Edwards
- Administrator of Norfolk Island – Edward Pickerd
- Administrator of the Northern Territory – Jock Nelson
- High Commissioner of Papua New Guinea – Les Johnson (until March 1974), then Tom Critchley

== Events ==
=== January ===
- A record strong monsoon gave an average rainfall over Australia of 231.69 millimetres (9.12 in), which beat the previous record by 105.11 millimetres (4.14 in), resulting in the heaviest flood of Lake Eyre for at least 500 years.
- January 1974 is also the wettest month since before 1900 over the following sub-regions of Australia:
  - Queensland with an average of 464.18 millimetres (18.27 in) (163 millimetres or 6.42 inches more than previous record from January 1918)
  - the Northern Territory with 320.47 millimetres (12.62 in)
  - the Murray-Darling Basin with 167.42 millimetres (6.59 in)
- 1 January –
  - Queen Elizabeth II creates five new knights in New South Wales and two in Queensland in her New Year Honours List. Chief Justice of New South Wales, Mr Justice Kerr, is made a Knight Commander of the Order of St Michael and St George. Broadcaster John Laws is appointed an OBE.
  - Evonne Goolagong defeats Chris Evert to win the Australian women's singles title at Kooyong Stadium.
  - Enoch Powell, Conservative MP and fiery critic of Britain's immigration laws, arrives in Australia.
- 2 January –
  - Steelworkers at the BHP are awarded big pay rises which will add $28 million to its annual wage bill immediately and $38 million by next December.
  - Mary, the 16-year-old gorilla which had her right leg amputated at Taronga Zoo on 11 December 1973 dies.
  - Federal Education Minister Kim Beazley resumes work after a two-month convalescence after he collapsed in Parliament House on 6 November 1973.
  - An Ansett Airlines Fokker F27 Friendship makes an emergency landing at Tullamarine Airport after a wheel fell from the undercarriage as the aircraft lifted off the runway.
- 3 January –
  - French President Pompidou reaffirms that France would continue to hold nuclear tests in the South Pacific. This draws an angry response from Australian unionists and the New Zealand Government.
  - In Victoria Street, East Sydney, a 30-man team of workmen use sledgehammers and axes to batter down the doors of 19 houses occupied by squatters barricaded themselves in, protesting against the proposed development.
- 5 January –
  - Deputy Prime Minister Lance Barnard makes a speech in New York to the American Australian Association in which he declares that Australia would not be a "junior partner" in strategic and military alliances. He says that Americans must expect that Australia's relations with America will be "consistent with our status as an independent nation".
  - Four people, including three flood victims trying to get home to Darwin, die when a light plane crashes near Barkly Down homestead, 60 miles north-west of Mount Isa, Queensland.
  - Prime Minister Gough Whitlam presents the inaugural E.G. Whitlam Shield to the Australian racing team for its victory over a visiting US team at Liverpool Speedway.
- 24 January - Cyclone Wanda makes landfall near Double Island Point. Large parts of South East Queensland, particularly Brisbane, and northern New South Wales are flooded.
- 31 January –
  - Private banks ask for immediate arbitration in the bank officers' salaries dispute which had spread to all States except Queensland. The bank officers are refusing to handle commercial cheques until they are successful in their claim for a 25 per cent pay rise.
  - Air Vice-Marshal R.T.Susans makes a public plea to Prime Minister Gough Whitlam to maintain Australia's two squadrons of Royal Australian Air Force Mirages in Malaysia.

=== February ===
- 3 February – A riot of 250 inmates erupts at Bathurst Gaol – at least nine prisoners are shot and a large part of the jail is destroyed by fire.
- 4 February –
  - The Federal Minister for Labour, Mr Cameron, meets officials of the Australian Bank Officials Association in Melbourne in an effort to break the deadlock in the bank dispute. The association decides to lift is week-old ban on handling commercial cheques.
  - Federal Treasurer, Frank Crean, estimates that flood damage in Queensland will probably exceed $50 million.
  - Prime Minister Gough Whitlam holds talks in Vientiane with Laotian Prime Minister Prince Souvanna Phouma and says that all foreign forces should be withdrawn from the Indo-China region by the Great Powers. He also says the United States should stop flying military hardware into Saigon.
- 6 February –
  - High tides and heavy seas cause flooding and damage to homes and other buildings on the Queensland Gold and Sunshine Coasts and the New South Wales North Coast. Waves of up to 20 feet batter the coast as Cyclone Pam sweeps southward offshore.
  - Acting Immigration Minister, Senator Dr. McClelland announces he will exercise his powers under the Passport Act to cancel the passports of Alexander Barton and his son who are currently residing in Rio de Janeiro.
- 7 February –
  - The New South Wales Government issues warrants for the arrest of millionaire businessman Alexander Barton and his son Thomas, who are in Brazil. The Federal Government can now move to have the Bartons extradited from Rio de Janeiro. The Bartons left Australia with their wives soon after the collapse of their companies and the loss then sanicof more than $250 million of the public's money.
  - In Singapore, Prime Minister Gough Whitlam and Singapore Prime Minister Lee Kuan Yew bury their public feud and compliment each other on their policies. Lee praises the changes in Australia's immigration policy, assistance to Aborigines and aid to refugees from Bangladesh and Pakistan.
- 26 February – Mungo Man, a human skeleton estimated to be 40,000 years old, uncovered at Lake Mungo

=== March ===
- 25 March - The Liberal Party led by Charles Court wins the 1974 Western Australian state election.

=== April ===
- 12 April - Tasmanian Attorney-General and Deputy Premier Merv Everett resigns to contest the Senate. He is replaced by W.A. Neilson.

=== May ===
- 18 May –
  - The 1974 Australian federal election is held. Labor retains with 66 of the 127 seats, compared with 67 of 125 in the old House. In the Senate, the Democratic Labour Party is eliminated, having failed to come to its usual arrangement with the Coalition parties. With 29 seats each to Labor and the Coalition, the balance is ostensibly held by the Independent from Tasmania, Townley, and Liberal Movement's Steele Hall, from South Australia.
  - The 1974 Australian referendum is held simultaneously with the federal election. Referendum proposals on democratic elections (including one person one vote), simultaneous Senate and House elections, methods of altering the Constitution and local government received final overall votes of 46.8% Yes: 48.3% No.
  - John Howard enters Parliament as an Opposition backbencher for the Division of Bennelong.

=== July ===
- 1 July – Australia's road signs switch from imperial to metric.

=== August ===
- 6–7 August – Australia's first and only joint-sitting of the two houses of Federal Parliament takes place in Canberra.
- 29 August - 12-year-old Aboriginal boy Jimmy Taylor goes missing from Derby, Western Australia.

=== October ===
- October – The first Australian credit card, Bankcard, is introduced.

=== December ===
- 7 December - The 1974 Queensland state election is held. Premier Joh Bjelke-Petersen had campaigned on "the alien, stagnating, centralist, socialist, communist-inspired policies of the federal Labor government". In the resulting 10.7% swing against Labor, the Nationals secured 39 seats, the Liberals 30 and Labor slumped to 11.
- 24 December – Cyclone Tracy devastates the city of Darwin. The official death toll was 71.
- 29 December – Two parachutists are killed when they hit the ground with their parachutes unopened at 2am at Rylstone, New South Wales where the 13th Australian Parachuting Championships are being held at Rylestone-Kandos Aerodrome. The safety director for the Australian Parachutists' Association said the 2am jump was unscheduled and not part of the championships. At a federal parliamentary grievance debate on 13 February 1975, vice-president of the Australian Parachute Federation Alan Jay states that both the flight and the jump were unauthorised and that the consumption of alcohol had "obviously" contributed to the fatalities with the two parachutists jumping while twice the legal blood alcohol limit.
- Averaged over Australia, 1974 is by far the wettest year since 1890 with an annual average of 759.65 millimetres (29.91 in), which some former estimates had as high as 784 millimetres (30.87 in). It beat the previous record of 1950 by 144.06 millimetres (5.67 in).

== Arts and literature ==
- Conductor Bernard Heinze is announced as Australian of the Year
- Ronald McKie's novel The Mango Tree wins the Miles Franklin Award

== Film ==
- The Cars That Ate Paris, directed by Peter Weir, is released

== Television ==
- The long running popular music program Countdown first screens
- Soap operas The Box and Class of '74 begin

== Sport ==
- 14 September – John Farrington wins his third men's national marathon title, clocking 2:17:23 in Gawler.
- 21 September – Minor premiers Eastern Suburbs defeat Canterbury-Bankstown 19–4 at the 1974 NSWRFL Grand Final, claiming their first premiership since 1945 and their tenth overall. Balmain finish in last position on points difference, claiming their first wooden spoon since 1911.
- Think Big wins the Melbourne Cup
- Victoria wins the Sheffield Shield
- Apollo takes line honours in the Sydney to Hobart Yacht Race. Love and War is the handicap winner
- Australia defeats the USA 2–1 in the Federation Cup
- The Australian team makes its first World Cup appearance when it competes in the 1974 FIFA World Cup
- Rothmans medal awarded to Graham Eadie
- Richmond wins the 78th VFL Premiership (Richmond 18.20 (128) d North Melbourne 13.9 (87))
- Brownlow Medal awarded to Keith Greig (North Melbourne)

== Births ==
- 24 January – Melissa Tkautz, actress
- 28 February – Kate Allen, field hockey player
- 22 March – Irena Olevsky, synchronized swimmer
- 5 April – Deborah Sosimenko, hammer thrower
- 1 May – Kellie Crawford (née Hoggart), singer and actress, Teen Queens and Hi-5
- 3 May – Peter Everitt, footballer and radio host
- 19 May – Andrew Johns, rugby league footballer
- 6 June – Nik Kosef, rugby league footballer
- 12 June – Scott Ferrier, decathlete
- 13 June – Tristram Woodhouse, field hockey forward
- 22 June – Lyndsay Walker, cricketer
- 23 June – Joel Edgerton, actor and filmmaker
- 2 July
  - Michael Budd, actor and director
  - Matthew Reilly, writer
- 6 July – James Swan, boxer
- 15 July – Chris Taylor, comedian
- 16 July
  - Michelle Chandler, basketball player
  - Wendell Sailor, rugby league footballer
- 12 August – Karl Stefanovic, TV host
- 18 September – Andrew Hansen, comedian and musician
- 28 September – Shane Webcke, rugby league footballer
- 18 October – Brett Dallas, rugby league player
- 24 October – Catherine Sutherland, actress, Power Rangers
- 1 November – Emma George, pole vaulter
- 20 November – Drew Ginn, rower
- 19 December – Ricky Ponting, cricketer

== Deaths ==
- 6 April – Hudson Fysh, aviator and businessman (b. 1895)
- 1 May – Sir Frank Packer, media proprietor (b. 1906)
- 6 May – Stanley Frederick Utz, businessman (b. 1898)
- 10 June – Prince Henry, Duke of Gloucester, 11th Governor General of Australia (born and died in the United Kingdom) (b. 1900)
- 31 August – Jim Zimin, Russian Empire-born Australian peanut farmer (b. 1902)
- 10 October – George Bennett, Australian rules footballer (Footscray, Hawthorn) (b. 1911)

== See also ==
- 1974 in Australian television
- List of Australian films of 1974
