= Peter Andersson =

Peter Andersson may refer to:

- Peter Andersson (actor) (born 1953), Swedish actor
- Peter Andersson (basketball) (born 1958), Swedish Olympic basketball player
- Peter Andersson (musician) (born 1973), Swedish musician with Raison D'être
- Peter Andersson (Lina Baby Doll), Swedish musician with Deutsch Nepal
- Peter Andersson (ice hockey, born 1962)
- Peter Andersson (ice hockey, born 1965)
- Peter Andersson (ice hockey, born 1991)

== See also ==
- Peter Anderson (disambiguation)
- Peter Andersen (disambiguation)
