= Pick a Box =

- Also known as: BP Pick a Box
- Genre: Game show
- Presented by: Bob Dyer; Dolly Dyer
- Country of origin: Australia
- Original language: English
- No. of episodes: 900 (approx.)

Production
- Production locations: ATN-7 studios, Sydney
- Running time: 25 minutes

Original release
- Network: Macquarie Broadcasting Service; Seven Network
- Release: 2 March 1957 – 28 June 1971

Related
- Ford Superquiz (1981–1982)

Pick a Box is an Australian game show that first aired on radio in 1948 until the early 1960s; subsequently, the concept transferred to TV and was broadcast from 1957 and 1971. The program was hosted by the husband-and-wife duo Bob and Dolly Dyer

== History ==
=== Radio program ===
Beginning initially as a radio program in 1948, it was heard Australia-wide on was then the Macquarie Broadcasting Service (now Nine Entertainment Co.).

It was originally produced in Sydney, New South Wales at studio 2GB. The program successfully made the move to television, debuting at 8:00 pm on Saturday 2 March 1957, less than six months after the new medium had been launched in Australia. Nevertheless, the program continued to be heard on radio for some years.

=== Television version ===
The TV version in addition to the radio version was filmed in the studios of Sydney's ATN-7 and was broadcast on ATN-7 and Melbourne's GTV-9, which were initially affiliated.

This changed, however, when Frank Packer, owner of TCN-9, bought a controlling share in GTV-9 and formed the National Television Network, which later became the Nine Network. As a result, in 1963 ATN-7 and HSV-7 came together to form the Australian Television Network, now known as the Seven Network. The affiliation changes meant that Pick a Box became part of the newly formed Seven Network and its Melbourne broadcast moved from GTV-9 to HSV-7.

The program was initially broadcast on Saturday nights and sponsored by the Colgate-Palmolive Company of Australia. Three years later, on 4 July 1960, the show was moved to Monday nights at 7:00 pm and was sponsored by BP.

== Presenters ==
Bob Dyer, who produced and packaged the show for the Seven Network, decided in 1969 that it was time to start thinking about ending the show. After approximately 900 episodes, Pick a Box broadcast its final episode on 28 June 1971. As they owned the program, the Dyers then reviewed most of the archived episodes – kept a few as souvenirs and discarded most of them. The couple then retired to Queensland where Bob pursued his other great love, fishing.

In 1971 the show was still the seventh most popular in the country.

== Format ==
The format for each episode consisted of two contestants participating in a multi-question trivia quiz. The contestant who correctly answered a set number of questions, was invited to choose from one of 30 boxes. Without disclosing the box's contents (which could be either valuable or a booby prize), Dyer would offer the contestant a cash payment in lieu of the prize. Here appears one of the program's catch phrases, "The money or the box?"

To increase the risk/suspense, he would sometimes offer increasing amounts of cash to contestants who chose the box. After receiving the cash or prize, contestants had the option of leaving the show undefeated, or returning to play for more prizes, at the risk of losing those already won.

This format remained largely unchanged throughout its entire run.

== Famous contestants ==
The first contestant to make a name for himself was Ken Eccleston, who gained fame over 10 weeks in 1958 when he achieved what was then the longest winning streak on the program. After claiming the official title of "Mr Pick a Box" during a closely fought contest with Melbourne entrant George Morris, Eccleston retired from the game with a total of AU£3873/5/-, or AU$7746.50. ($121,477.99 in 2018 currency, adjusted for inflation)

Two other famous contestants were Frank Partridge, the last Australian to be awarded the Victoria Cross in World War II, and George Black, who went on to become a question writer for the show.

However, by far the program's most successful contestant was Barry Jones, who won a total of 208 episodes spanning eight years between 1960 and 1967, winning over A$58,000.

Jones was known for taking issue with Dyer about certain expected answers, most famously in response to a question about "the first British Governor-General of India", where he pointed out that Warren Hastings was technically only the Governor-General of the Presidency of Fort William in Bengal Presidency. Jones' appearances on Pick a Box lasted from 1960 to 1968.

Jones later became a member of the Parliament of Victoria and then of the Federal Parliament, a minister in the Hawke government and president of the Australian Labor Party. He was also chosen as an Australian Living Treasure.

Pick a Box was added to the National Film and Sound Archive's Sounds of Australia Registry in 2010. An excerpt of Episode 170, featuring Barry Jones, has been published online.

The show's later remake, Ford Superquiz, featured Hutton "Red" Gibson as a contestant. Gibson, who had already won thousands of dollars as a Grand Champion on the game show Jeopardy! in his native United States, had a prolonged run of several weeks as champion on Superquiz.

== Episode status ==
Out of the 900+ episodes made, 73 are stored at the National Film and Sound Archive, including the final episode, according to a search of the archive's website.

== Superquiz ==
- Ford Superquiz was a remake of the show hosted by Bert Newton and his wife Patti Newton and produced by the Reg Grundy organisation for the Nine Network. It began in 1981 and ran for two seasons with the number of boxes reduced to 20. It was sponsored by the Ford Motor Company of Australia.
- Superquiz was a remake of the show in 1989 hosted by Mike Walsh and Deborah Hutton on Network Ten. The number of boxes was further reduced to 12 in this version.
- Super Quiz is a series of games and books as well as a syndicated quiz column and online quiz game created by Ken Fisher.

== See also ==
- It Pays to Be Funny, Bob Dyer's other television game show, ran from 26 February 1957 to around November of the same year
- List of Australian game shows
- List of Australian television series
