= 1974 in Australian television =

This is a list of Australian television-related events in 1974.

== Events ==
- 18 March – The Reg Grundy Organisation's new Australian daily soap opera for teenagers set in a secondary school Class of 74 starts screening on Seven Network. The following year it was changed to Class of 75, before getting axed.
- 1 April – Long running American soap opera The Young and the Restless starts its first broadcast in Australia on Nine Network.
- 9 June – Australian horror anthology series The Evil Touch airs its final episode on Nine Network.
- 21 June – A new short lived Australian science fiction television series for children called Alpha Scorpio debuts on ABC only running for six episodes.
- October – Test colour transmissions commence across all networks.
- 8 November – Australian music program Countdown premieres on ABC with Grant Goldman as the first host.
- 31 December – News Limited and Nine Network have launched a 28-hour telethon to raise funding for the relief effort of Darwin, Northern Territory after the city was wiped out by Cyclone Tracy.

== Debuts ==
Program	Network	Debut date
The Ernie Sigley Show	Nine Network	22 January
The Box	Channel 0	11 February
Class of 74	Seven Network	18 March
Blind Date	Seven Network	8 April
Alpha Scorpio	ABC	21 June
Don Burrows	ABC	15 June
Rush	ABC	20 August
Countdown	ABC	8 November
A Touch of Reverence	ABC	21 November
Sounds Unlimited	Seven Network	Late 1974

=== New international programming ===
- 21 January – (United States) The Electric Company (ABC)
- 15 February/4 April – (United States) Hawkins (15 February: Seven Network - Sydney, 4 April: Seven Network - Melbourne)
- 1 April – (United States) The Young and the Restless (Nine Network)
- 1 April – (United States) Dusty's Trail (Nine Network)
- 15 April – (United States) Help!... It's the Hair Bear Bunch! (Nine Network)
- 21 April – (United States) Kojak (The 0-10 Network)
- 6 May – (Canada) The Beachcombers (ABC)
- 13 May – (United States) Mission: Magic! (The 0-10 Network)
- 26 May – (United Kingdom) Whatever Happened to the Likely Lads? (ABC)
- 27 May – (United States) Wild, Wild World of Animals (ABC)
- 10 June – (United States) Bailey's Comets (Nine Network)
- 26 June – (United States) Shaft (Seven Network)
- 30 June – (United States) The Six Million Dollar Man (The 0-10 Network)
- 1 July – (United Kingdom) Thriller (Seven Network)
- 20 July – (United States) Butch Cassidy and the Sundance Kids (ABC)
- 28 July – (United States) My Favorite Martians (ABC)
- 3 August – (United Kingdom) Jack the Ripper (1973) (ABC)
- 18 August – (United Kingdom) Man About the House (ABC)
- 14 September – (United States) Needles and Pins (ABC)
- 22 September – (United States) Happy Days (Nine Network)
- 17 October – (United Kingdom) The Ascent of Man (ABC)
- 19 October – (United States) Speed Buggy (ABC)
- 3 November – (United States) Adam's Rib (Seven Network)
- 6 November/9 December – (United States) Doc Elliot (6 November: Nine Network - Sydney, 9 December: Nine Network - Melbourne)
- 12 December – (United States) Bob & Carol & Ted & Alice (Nine Network)
- (United States) Inch High, Private Eye (Nine Network)
- (United States) Super Friends (1973) (The 0-10 Network)

== Television shows ==
=== 1950s ===
- Mr. Squiggle and Friends (1959–1999).

=== 1960s ===
- Football Inquest (1960–1974)
- Four Corners (1961–present).
- It's Academic (1968–1978)
- Division 4 (1969–1975)
- GTK (1969–1974)

=== 1970s ===
- Hey Hey It's Saturday (1971–1999, 2009–2010).
- Young Talent Time (1971–1988)
- Countdown (1974–1987).

== Ending this year ==
Date	Show	Channel	Debut
13 April	Ryan	Seven Network	27 May 1973
26 May	Football Inquest	HSV-7	9 April 1960
9 June	The Evil Touch	Nine Network	19 June 1973
26 July	Alpha Scorpio	ABC	21 June 1974
5 December	A Touch of Reverence	ABC	21 November 1974
1974	GTK	ABC	4 August 1969
1974	The Price Is Right	Channel 0	5 February 1973

== See also ==
- 1974 in Australia
- List of Australian films of 1974
