= Peter O'Sullivan (Australian footballer) =

Australian rules footballer

Personal information
- Full name: Peter Daniel O'Sullivan
- Born: 22 May 1932
- Died: 23 September 1972 (aged 40) near Ouyen, Victoria
- Original team: Ascot Youth Centre
- Height: 180 cm (5 ft 11 in)
- Weight: 76 kg (168 lb)
- Position: Half forward/Wingman

Playing career^{1}
Years	Club	Games (Goals)
1952–1955	Essendon	47 (1)
1956–1958	North Melbourne	24 (7)
1959	Coburg (VFA)	16 (24)
1962	Sorrento	16 (0)
- ^{1} Playing statistics correct to the end of 1958.

Peter Daniel O'Sullivan (22 May 1932 – 23 September 1972) was an Australian rules footballer who played with Essendon and North Melbourne in the Victorian Football League (VFL) during the 1950s.

== Football ==
O'Sullivan, who was a good performer for Ascot Youth Centre in the Essendon District League before joining the VFL, played his football on the wing and as a half-forward flanker.

After making 12 appearances in his debut season with Essendon, O'Sullivan played 19 games in 1953, including a semi final.

Over the next two seasons O'Sullivan found in more difficult to establish a place for himself in the side.

In 1956 joined Charlie Gaudion's North Melbourne. He spent three years at North Melbourne, including the 1957 season in the reserves when North Melbourne 14.13 (97) defeated Fitzroy 13.15 (93) in the grand final—O'Sullivan, who kicked 4 goals, was best on the ground.

He finished his career in the Victorian Football Association at Coburg. In 1962 O'Sullivan coached Sorrento in the Mornington Peninsula Football League.

== Death ==
At the age of 40, O'Sullivan, a passenger, was killed in a car accident on the Calder Highway, south of Ouyen, on 23 September 1972.
