= Rachael Robertson (writer) =

Australian author and keynote speaker (born 1969)

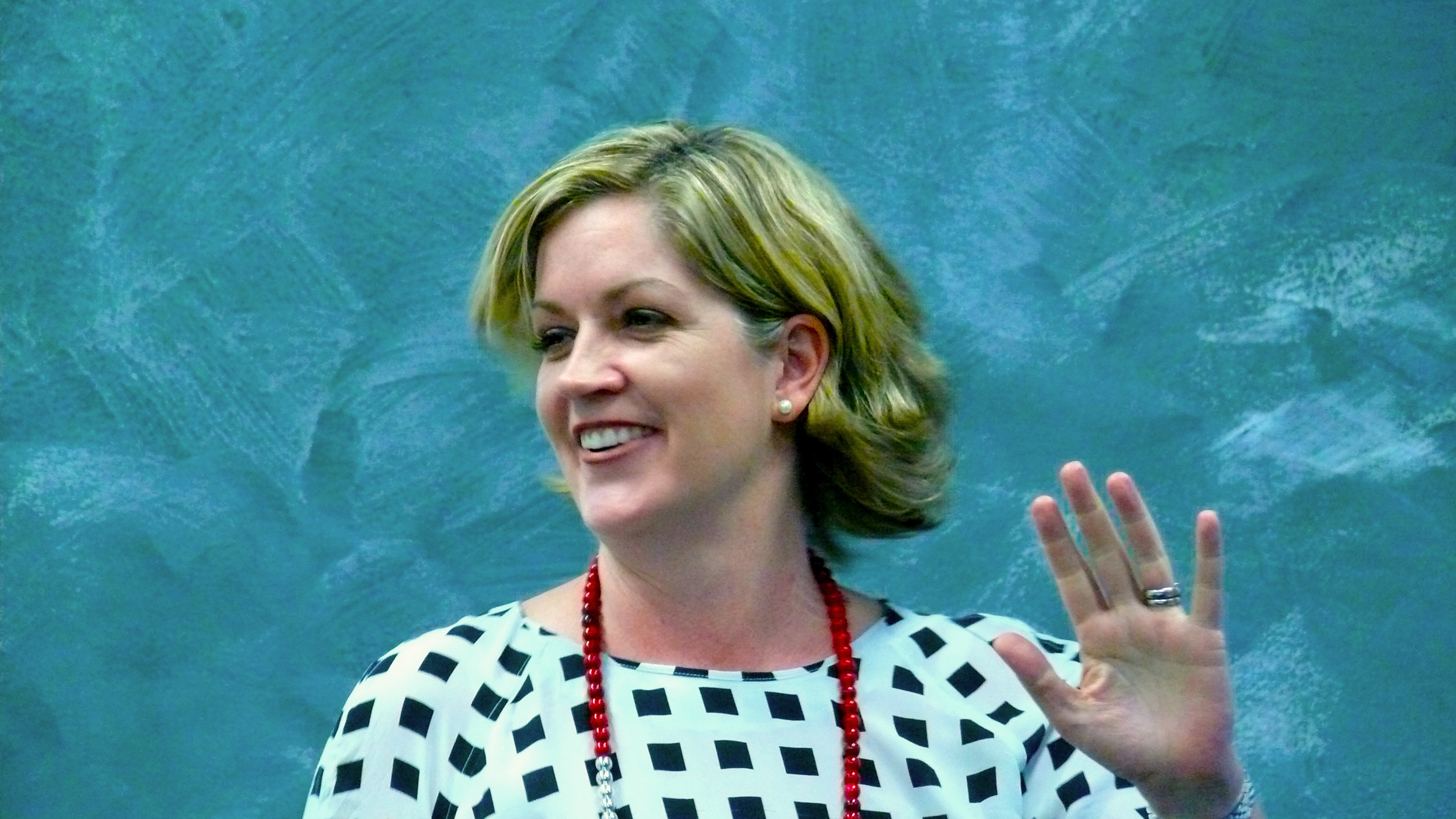
- Education: Deakin University, B.A. University of Melbourne, MBA
- Occupations: Author keynote speaker
- Years active: 2006–present
- Known for: Antarctic expedition leader (2005)
- Website: http://www.rachaelrobertson.com.au

Rachael Robertson is an Australian author, keynote speaker, and leadership expert. She is an authority on leading in extreme environments. Robertson is a former Antarctic Expedition Leader, who led the 58th Australian National Antarctic Research Expedition (ANARE) to Davis Station in 2005. She was only the second female to ever lead a team at the Station and one of the youngest ever leaders.

== Personal life ==
Robertson was born in Geelong, Victoria, to Sharon and Lawrence Robertson, and grew up with a younger brother and sister. She spent the majority of her pre-adult life living in the South Eastern suburbs of Melbourne. Robertson currently resides in Melbourne, and is a "third generation Geelong Cats AFL supporter".

== Early career ==
Robertson graduated from Deakin University with a Bachelor of Arts majoring in Public Relations and commenced a career in Public Relations with Melbourne Parks and Waterways. She moved out of PR and into the operational role of Park Ranger – Customer Services with the newly created Parks Victoria. At the time of leaving for Antarctica, she was Chief Ranger of Victoria's South West Region.

She holds an MBA from Melbourne Business School.

== Antarctica ==
Robertson became Australia's youngest and the second female Antarctic Station Leader at Davis Station. Robertson led the 120 scientists and tradespeople in Davis station over the Antarctic summer (December 2004 to February 2005). She then led and managed the 17 other people who remained behind at Davis Station to maintain the operation until the scientists and tradespeople returned in November 2005. In "Leading on the Edge", she recounts the wide disparity between Antarctic life in summer, and Antarctic life in winter.

Robertson quoted, "the repetitive monotony of the day-to-day work and the same old faces at breakfast, lunch and dinner create a nine-month-long 'groundhog day' experience". .

During her time in Antarctica Robertson was responsible for all aspects of life on the Station, from the safety and welfare of over 80 expeditioners in Summer, to the delivery of the Australian Government's $20mn science program. .

== Robertson's leadership ideas ==
Robertson earned an MBA when she returned from Antarctica.

In her 2014 book 'Leading on the Edge' Rachael outlines the 'extraordinary stories and leadership insights' she gained during her time in Antarctica, leading to her development of a culture of respect trumps harmony.

In her 2020 book 'Respect Trumps Harmony' Robertson further explores the 3 tools that lie at the core of the respect trumps harmony leadership practice she prescribes as follows:

- No Triangles – a tool to put an end to gossip, improve accountability and the quatily of feedback and drive innovation.
- The bacon war – a gentle circuit breaker for calling out dysfunctional behaviour.
- Lead without a title – an approach to developing personal leadership in your team, so responsibility and initiative are shared.

These tools are the three pillars that hold up the respect trumps harmony culture.

== Work ==
As of June 2026, Robertson has presented at more than 2500 conferences and events across a wide range of industries including mining, healthcare, education, finance, construction, and retail. Rachael's work is described as focusing on 'equipping leaders with tools they can apply immediately'. Her work centres on practical leadership and clear behaviours, which when applied consistenlty improve how teams operate day to day.

The clients she works with range from large global organisations, such as Randstad, to local fundraising events such as Day of Inspiration. Businesses she has worked with include Indeed, Westpac, Bunnings Warehouse, Worely Parsons, Chevron, NSW Department of Education, UBS, and Crown.

In 2025, she delivered keynote addresses at significant events, such as the International Women's Day Event Series in Adelaide (March 4) and BerryQuest International in Hobart (February 24–27).

Robertson has been an Australia Day ambassador.
