= Ann Shoebridge =

Australian milliner (born 1973)

- Born: 1973 (age 52–53); Melbourne
- Occupation: milliner
- Known for: hats, fascinators
- Notable work: Tokyu collection
- Website: https://www.annshoebridge.com/

Ann Georgina Shoebridge is an Australian milliner. She was born in Portland, Victoria, and now lives in Sydney.

Her work has been shown at the Sherman Contemporary Art Foundation, and the National Gallery of Victoria.

Shoebridge's hats are held in the National Gallery of Victoria collection, and have been presented at the Art Gallery of New South Wales.

She was a 2013 finalist for Hat Designer of the year.
