= Bob Dyer =

American-born vaudeville entertainer, radio personality and quiz show host

Bob Dyer OBE
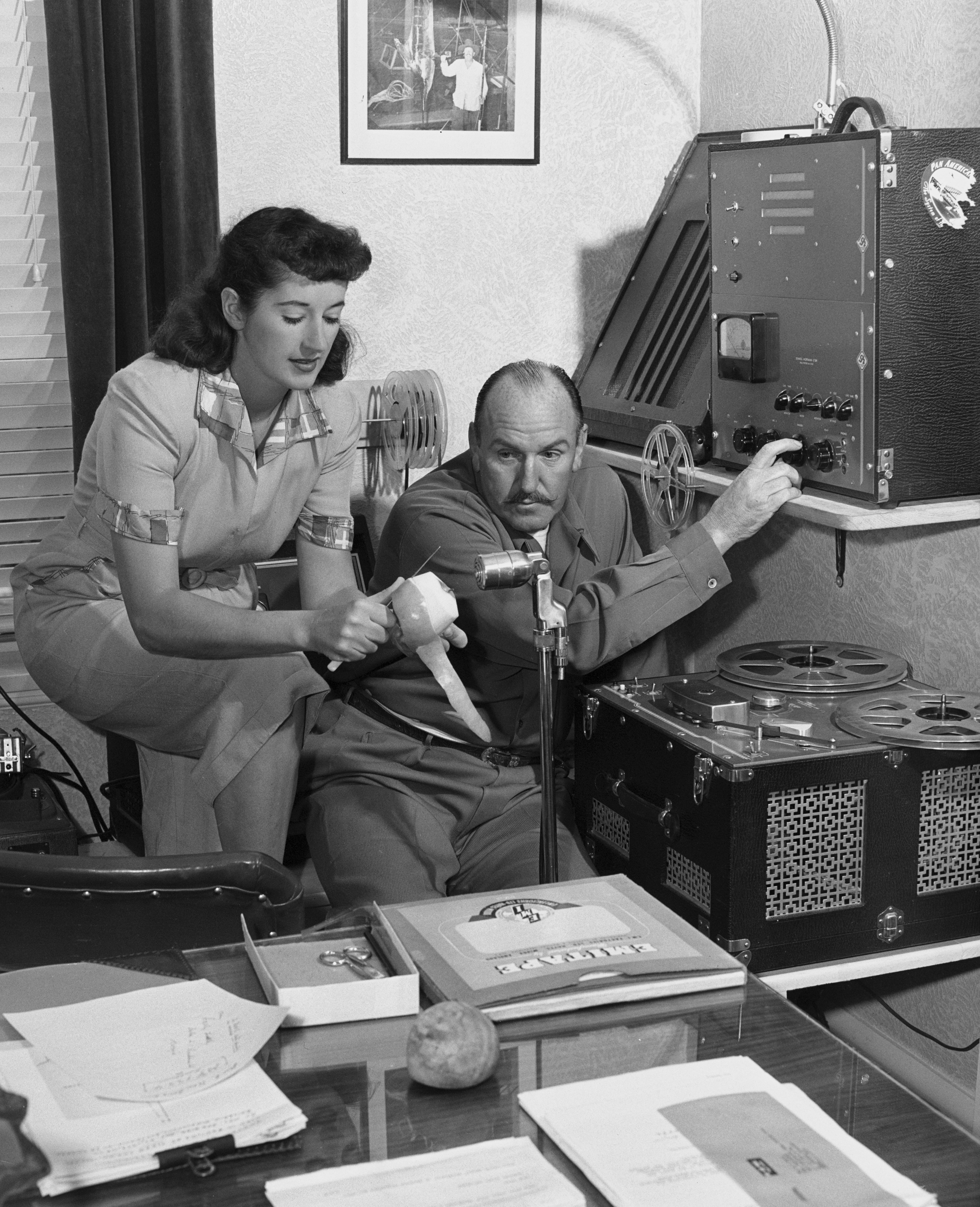
- Dolly and Bob Dyer recording 'the secret sound' at their home in Mosman, 1953
- Born: Robert Neal Dyer; 22 May 1909; Hartsville, Tennessee, U.S.
- Died: 9 January 1984 (aged 74); Gold Coast, Queensland, Australia
- Occupations: Vaudevillian; entertainer; singer; radio and television personality; quiz show host
- Years active: 1936−1971
- Spouse: Dolly Dyer
- Awards: Gold Logie

Robert Neal Dyer OBE (22 May 1909 – 9 January 1984) was a Gold Logie-award-winning American-born Australian vaudeville entertainer and singer, radio and television personality, and radio and television quiz show host who made his name in Australia. Dyer is best known for the long-running radio and then television quiz show, Pick a Box.

At the height of his radio career, Dyer and his friend and rival, Jack Davey, were regarded as Australia's top quiz comperes.

Bob and his wife, Dolly, were probably, after Sir Robert and Dame Pattie Menzies, the most recognised double act in Australia in the 1960s. Bob and Dolly's main interest besides performing was big-game fishing and, between them, they broke some 200 world and Australian fishing records.

== Early life and career ==
Bob Dyer was born in Hartsville, Tennessee, to Heywood Leahman Dies, a sharefarmer and his wife Delia (née Bell) . In an interview much later in his life with Barry Jones, Dyer spoke of his childhood:

Back in Hartsville County my elder brother, a Negro boy and I all grew up together. We walked to school every day and walked back home together, but at the crossroads the Negro boy walked one way to the all-black school while my brother and I went to the all-white school. What was the point of separation during school hours when we were brothers for the rest of the day? Our black friend later got into trouble and died tragically. I often wonder what would have happened if our colors had been reversed. That is why I have always hated racial or religious intolerance.

Dyer left school at 12 and worked as "a dish-washer, cab driver, ice man, carpenter, milk-bar attendant, and railway freight hand" before taking up theater work involving touring the United States vaudeville circuits. He first came to Australia in 1936, touring with Jim Davidson's ABC Dance Band. He returned to Sydney in 1937 as a member of the Marcus Show, doing a hillbilly and ukulele act on the Tivoli circuit, combining comedy with singing. Australian radio personality Harry Griffiths was a child at the time but met Dyer through his musician father who played first trombone for the Marcus shows. He says that "If Bob didn't steal the show, he came darned near it, and he was a big hit. He was a good actor, musical and full of life. He knew how to do gags, grace possible way, touring with travelling shows and doing five shows a day in the US".

Dyer then traveled to England, where he appeared on television in its early era, before returning to Australia in 1940, using the billing "the last of the hillbillies". He created, at the request of radio station 3DB (Melbourne), 26 episodes of a radio program titled The Last of the Hill Billies. In 1940, when performing at Sydney's Tivoli Theatre, he met Dolly Mack (stage name for Thelma Phoebe McLean, (1921–2004), who was a Tivoli chorus girl. He proposed nine days after their meeting, and nine days after that they were married at St John's Church, Darlinghurst. The reception was held between shows on the last day of The Crazy Show. The next day the show went to Brisbane and they spent their honeymoon in Surfers Paradise in a borrowed car.

Bob and Dolly entertained Australian and American troops during World War II, performing in war zones in New Guinea and the Solomon Islands.

== Radio and television career ==
In the 1940s and 1950s, Bob Dyer established himself as a radio star, moving onto television in the late 1950s. Dyer was known for his flamboyance. Jim Low, reviewing a CD containing Dyer's music, comedy and radio programs, comments on "Dyer's genuine warmth towards his contestants and his ability to milk a situation for its entertainment and comic potential". However, he was not a naturally funny man and so "plotted all the stunts he used meticulously".

=== Radio ===
Dyer's early radio shows were "stunt shows... [that] were different from the other vaudeville shows on radio at the time for, instead of a comedian or a group of people getting up in front of an audience and telling jokes, the Dyer shows depended for their fun on members of the audience themselves". The shows included Can You Take it? and It Pays to Be Funny. The idea for these shows came from the United States of America. Dyer was given permission by the American radio and television star, Art Linkletter, to use and adapt his scripts and stunts in Australia. People enjoyed the stunts, apparently enjoying seeing "their fellows put into funny and sometimes embarrassing situations ... but few 'victims' came out of the stunt shows with hard feelings; Bob Dyer was always genial and good-humoured and the prizes for doing ridiculous things were substantial".

Dyer's shows were sponsored by Solvol, Atlantic Union Oil (for which he used the greeting "Happy motoring, customers") and Colgate-Palmolive (with the greeting "Happy lathering, customers"). In one of these he included secret sounds, such as tearing a plaster off his arm, a dog scratching fleas, or a cat lapping milk. Another, Can You Take It?, comprised "scrapes and dares [and was] designed to outdo a similar show by his friend and rival Jack Davey". Barry Jones, long time quiz contestant on Pick a Box, wrote that "he had a long-standing rivalry, partly genuine, partly simulated, with Jack Davey, presumably modeled on the 'feud' in the United States between Jack Benny and Fred Allen". Harry Griffiths says of the two that Dyer's "gags might have been more obvious than Jack Davey's slick humor but Bob knew what people wanted. His stuff was for the masses". However, while Davey had the sharper wit, he "was essentially a radio performer who failed to make a fully successful transition to television". Lesley Johnson, in her biography of Jack Davey for the Australian Dictionary of Biography, writes that "in contrast to Dyer's carefully written scripts, Davey's spontaneity and wit, delivered in the warm, rich voice, for which he was so well known on radio, did not attract television audiences".

Australian radio personality John Pearce, who knew both Davey and Dyer, wrote in his autobiography that Dyer:

allowed the television people to tell him how it [Pick a Box] could be transformed into the new medium, realising that TV is eighty per cent visual, and a gesture, a piece of visible "business" is far more important than all the clever, rapier-fast dialogue. Bob really worked at it, and he took every piece of advice offered. Following the recording of one of his early shows, he turned from all the people telling him how good it had been and went to one of the cameraman. "I noticed you threw up your hands in horror at something I did. Where did I go wrong?" He was told, and never did it again. Davey would have been looking to have the cameraman sacked!

Some well known Australian actors, such as Bud Tingwell and John Ewart, worked as assistant comperes on Dyer's radio programs. As Tingwell had described it, the role of the assistant compere was to "do the big, posh Colgate-Palmolive commercials during the show as well as... the introductions" of Bob himself and the contestants. Tingwell describes this period of his life as "an extraordinarily generous period, working with a very, very good professional" noting that Dyer would release him for his film work and use a temporary assistant until he returned.

=== Pick a Box ===
In 1948, when he was also compering Winner Take All and Cop The Lot, Dyer launched the quiz show Pick a Box on radio. He toned down his hillbilly twang and "replaced his yellow boots and loud checks with a respectable suit, tie and glasses". In 1957, Pick a Box made its television debut. It was first sponsored by Colgate-Palmolive and later by BP. It was the first big quiz show on national television. Dyer's catch-cry on the show, "the money or the box", was a familiar phrase in Australia decades after the show ended. "Howdy, customers, howdy" and "Tell them Bob sent you" were other well-known Dyer catch-cries.

== Honours ==
In 1969 Dyer believed that the show was losing its popularity and two years later, in 1971, he and Dolly decided to retire. In June 1971, a few weeks before the last Pick a Box was screened, Bob and Dolly both appeared in the Queen's Birthday Honours list. Bob, still a US citizen, was made an honorary Officer of the Order of the British Empire (OBE), while Dolly was appointed a Member of the Order (MBE). At the ceremony, the Governor of New South Wales, Sir Roden Cutler, who was "not generally known for his humour, asked Bob if he wanted to take the medal or the box it was in". Dyer also won two Gold Logie Awards, one in 1960 and, in 1971, a special Gold Logie to him and Dolly to mark their contribution to the industry over 15 years.

=== First television simulcast ===
Early in 1957, ATN began simulcasting eight radio shows from the Macquarie Auditorium. These included two by Bob Dyer, It Pays to Be Funny and Pick a Box. Within a year, only Pick a Box was still on the air. It was simulcast for five years.

== Big-game fishing ==
On retirement Bob and Dolly moved to the Isle of Capri in Queensland's Gold Coast and took up seriously what had previously been a hobby, big-game fishing for such fish as marlin. Between them, they broke 50 world records, and 150 Australian records.

== Later life and death ==
In the late 1970s, Bob and Dolly sold their house and moved to a high-rise apartment. Bob developed Alzheimer's disease and became reclusive until his death in 1984. Dolly died almost twenty one years later, on Christmas Day 2004.
