= Peter Andersen =

Peter Andersen may refer to:

- DQ (singer) (born 1973), Danish singer born Peter Andersen
- Peter Andersen (Kosovan curler) (born 1993), Canadian-Kosovan curler
- Peter Andersen (Danish curler) (born 1957), Danish curler
- Peter Andersen (gymnast) (1884–1956), Danish Olympic gymnast
- Peter S. Andersen (1871–1948), Danish actor
- Peter Marius Andersen (1885–1972), Danish footballer
- Peter Andersen (industrialist) (1814–1887), Danish industrialist
- Peter Riis Andersen (born 1980), Danish cyclist
- Peter Andersen (film), a 1941 Danish film

== See also ==
- Peter Andersson (disambiguation)
