= Gerard Reinmuth =

Australian architect (born 1970)

Gerard Kerry Reinmuth
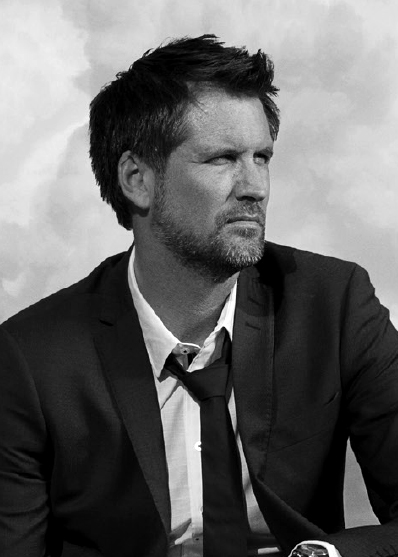
- Born: 27 October 1970 (age 55); Battery Point Tasmania
- Education: University of Tasmania, University of Sydney, Royal Melbourne Institute of Technology
- Occupation: Architect
- Practice: TERROIR Pty Ltd

Gerard Kerry Reinmuth (born 27 October 1970, in Battery Point) is an Australian architect. He is a director of architectural practice TERROIR, which has been featured in a number of international exhibitions and publications the Venice Biennale, AV Monographs’ 20 International Emerging Architects, Phaidon’s 10×10/3 and Atlas of 21st Century Architecture, Australian Financial Review (AFR), TEDXSydney, AV Monographs’ 20 International Emerging Architects, Phaidon’s 10×10/3 and Atlas of 21st Century Architecture. Most recently he was selected to be a judge at the 2020 World Architecture Festival to be held in Lisbon.

== Academic career ==
Reinmuth graduated in 1991 with first-class honours in Bachelor of Environmental Design from the University of Tasmania and a Bachelor Architecture from the University of Sydney in 1996 as well as Masters in Architecture from Royal Melbourne Institute of Technology in 2007. He has been the Adjunct Professor of Architecture, at the University of Technology Sydney (UTS) since 2005 Reinmuth, is the founder of the International Studio at the Aarhus School of Architecture in Denmark, where he is also a Visiting Professor.

Professional associations include appointment as a Life Fellow of the Royal Australian Institute of Architects in 2018; a Registered Architect in the State of New South Wales since 2000 and a Register Architect in Denmark since 2009.

== Career ==
Reinmuth's first role was at Forward Viney Architects in Hobart from 1991 to 1995. One of the partners, Michael Viney, subsequently became a major influence and subject of his thesis at the University of Sydney in 1996. At Forward Viney Architects his colleagues included Nicholas Murcutt, Gaetano Palmese and Craig Rosevear. In 1995, Reinmuth commenced work at Denton Corker Marshall’s Sydney office, later to become JPW, where he worked predominantly for Richard Johnson on projects including the Asian Gallery at the AGNSW, 363 George Street and the Western Courtyard at the Australian War Memorial in Canberra. From 1998 to 1999 he worked as a project architect for Stirling Tolbooth at Richard Murphy Architects in Edinburgh.

=== TERROIR ===
In 1999 he co-founded the architectural practise TERROIR with Richard Blythe and Scott Balmforth. A strong relationship between these three individuals fuelled an ambition to develop a practice underpinned by a culture of creativity, driven by an ambition for design excellence and which approaches project work as an opportunity for original design research. The practice is a micro-international practice which remains mid-sized at 35 staff.

==== Key projects ====
- Penguin Parade(Philip Island, 2019)
- Tornhuset, in conjunction with Kim Utzon (Sweden, 2014)
- Maitland City Bowling Club(Maitland, 2014)
- Aarhus Housing, in conjunction with CUBO Arkitekter (Denmark, 2013)
- Burnie Maker’s Workshop(Tasmania, 2009)
- Statens Naturhistoriske Museum (Copenhagen, 2009)
- Commonwealth Place Kiosks (Canberra, 2008)
- 86-88 George Street (Sydney, 2005
- Peppermint Bay(Hobart, 2003)
- Tolmans Hill House (Tasmania, 2003)

==== Awards ====
2016	MIPIM Awards, Architectural Review Future Projects Award: Bispebjerg Hospital
2016	Newcastle AIA Awards, Commercial Architecture, Commendation: Club Maitland City
2015	Stadsbyggnadspris - Malmo City Building Prize, Winner of Public Building and Best Building in the Southern Swedish Architectural Awards: Tornhuset - World Maritime University (in association with Kim Utzon Arkitekt)
2015	Swedish National Architecture Award, Winner of National Architecture Award: Tornhuset - World Maritime University (in association with Kim Utzon Arkitekt)
2015	Timber Design Awards, Excellence in Timber Design: Clareville House
2014	Tasmanian AIA Awards, Alexander North Award for Interior Architecture: UTAS Institute of Marine and Antarctic Studies (in association with JWA)
2014	Tasmanian AIA Awards, Alan C Walker Award for Public Architecture, Colourbond Award for Steel Architecture: UTAS Institute of Marine and Antarctic Studies (in association with JWA)
2013	Aarhus City Architecture Award, Winner of City Architecture Award: Aarhus Student Housing (in association with CUBO Arkitekter)
2010	Tasmanian RAIA Awards, Alan C Walker Award for Public Architecture (TAS): Burnie Makers’ Workshop
2010	Australian Institute of Architects National Awards, Shortlisted announced in October: Burnie Makers’ Workshop
2009	Property Council of Australia Awards, High Commendation in Heritage and Adaptive Reuses: 86-88 George Street
2009	Australian Institute of Project Management, Sustainable project: 86-88 George Street
2009	Cement Concrete & Aggregates Australia Public Domain Awards, Commendation in Precincts: 86-88 George Street
2009	BPN National Sustainability Awards, Large Commercial: 86-88 George Street
2009	Australian Interior Design Awards, Best in State Residential Interior Design: Smith Street Warehouse
2008	RAIA Awards, ACT Urban Design Commendation: Commonwealth Place Amenities
2008	Tasmanian RAIA Awards, Small Projects Architecture Award: Fish349 Function Room
2007	Interior Design Awards, Best of State Commercial Interior Design Award: Fish349 Function Room
2007	Dulux Colorbond Awards, Commercial Exterior: Commonwealth Place Amenities
2007	The Green Building Council of Australia, 5-Star Green Star Office Design Rating the first for a State heritage-listed office building: 86-88 George Street
2007	Kenneth F. Brown Architecture Design Awards, Honourable Mention: Peppermint Bay
2006	RAIA Awards Residential New Commendation: Liverpool Crescent House Interior Architecture Commendation: Fish349
2006	Interior Design Awards, Emerging Practice Award: TERROIR Pty Ltd, Best of State Awards Commercial Interior Design: Fish349 Residential Interior Design: Liverpool Crescent House National Commendations Hospitality Interior Design: Fish349 Residential Interior Design: Liverpool Crescent House Colour in Residential Interior Design: Liverpool Crescent House
2004	Tasmanian RAIA Awards, Interior Architecture Commendation: Peppermint Bay
2004	Tourism Award, National Tourism Award: Peppermint Bay; Best New Development: Peppermint Bay
2001	Tasmanian RAIA Awards, Residential Award: Tranmere house
2000	Tasmanian RAIA Awards, Interiors Awards: Hobart Boutique Hotel
