= Dolly Dyer =

Australian Gold Logie winning radio and TV personality

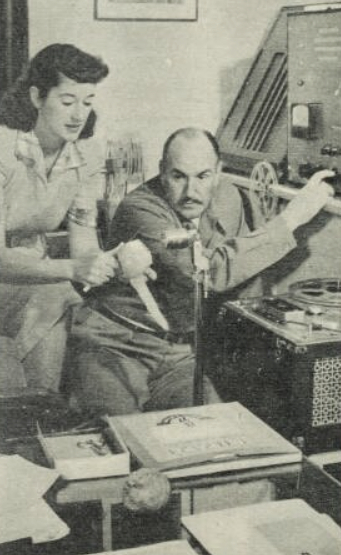
- Dolly and Bob Dyer recording 'the secret sound' at their home in Mosman, 1953
- Born: Thelma Phoebe McLean; 5 June 1921; Sydney, New South Wales, Australia
- Died: 25 December 2004 (aged 83)
- Occupations: Radio and television personality
- Years active: 1940–1971
- Spouse: Bob Dyer

Thelma Phoebe Mclean MBE (5 June 1921 – 25 December 2004), known professionally as Dolly Dyer (formerly Mack), was an Australian Gold Logie–winning radio and TV personality, and wife of fellow game-show host and performer Bob Dyer.

== Early life ==
She was born and grew up in Sydney's eastern suburbs. Her father died when she was young and she was raised by her mother. The family nickname was "Mack", so she took the name Dolly Mack when she was employed as a showgirl in Sydney's Tivoli Theatre in 1940.

She met her husband there, literally running into him in a doorway. They married within two weeks at St John's, Darlinghurst, Sydney.

== Entertainment career ==
During World War II, Dolly and Bob entertained Allied troops, including performing in South Pacific and New Guinea war zones.

After the war, Bob began the radio version of Pick a Box, which went to television in the late 1950s. Dolly appeared with him, introducing contestants and being a sidekick to Bob's humour.

== Retirement ==
They both retired in 1971, shortly before the last episode of Pick-a-Box was screened.

That year, Bob and Dolly were awarded a Special Gold Logie "in recognition of their contribution to Australian TV".

== Honours ==
Both were listed on the 1971 Queen's Birthday Honours list, with Dolly being appointed a Member of the Order of the British Empire (MBE). Bob was not eligible for a substantive award as he was an American citizen, but he was appointed an Honorary Officer of the Order.

In retirement, Dolly and her husband found time for their shared love of deep-sea fishing. They both broke several records, with Dolly breaking a 12-year women's record for a black marlin weighing 297 kilograms.

After Bob's death in 1984, Dolly took up dancing, winning several medals for her performances.

== Death ==
Dolly Dyer died of a stroke on Christmas Day, 2004. She was 83.
