= It Pays to Be Funny =

- Genre: Game show
- Presented by: Bob Dyer
- Country of origin: Australia
- Original language: English

Production
- Running time: 30 minutes

Original release
- Network: ATN-7; GTV-9
- Release: 1957 – 1958

It Pays to Be Funny is an Australian television comedy game show. In Sydney it aired on station ATN-7, while in Melbourne it aired on GTV-9 (at the time, the two stations were known for sharing some programs, as this was prior to the formation of the Seven Network and Nine Network). The half-hour show was hosted by Bob Dyer, who had previously hosted a version for radio on the Macquarie Radio Network.

A description in a 1957 edition of The Age newspaper said the television series "puts contestants though amusing situations with worth-while prizes as their reward", According to a different edition of The Age, one of these "situations" was having the contestant attempt to milk a cow

In one television episode, Jack Davey (himself a prolific Australian television and radio host of series like The Pressure Pak Show) appeared and gave Dyer a meringue pie in the face, and then "kissed" him

In another episode, a contestant named Mr. Martin had a water balloon poised above his head, while his wife tried to figure out what a man named Steve Petrovich was doing by pantomime. Failure to determine this would result in Mr. Martin having the water balloon dropped on him

Although kinescope recordings (also known as telerecordings) were likely made to allow the series to air on both stations, it is not known if any of these recordings of the television version still exist, and there is the possibility the series may be lost. However, it is known that transcription copies exist of the radio version at the National Film and Sound Archive
