= Peter Anderson (cricketer, born 1968) =

Australian cricketer (born 1968)

Personal information
- Born: 17 September 1968 (age 58); Geelong, Australia

Domestic team information
- Years: Team
- 1993: Victoria
- Source: Cricinfo, 10 December 2015

Peter Anderson (born 17 September 1968) is an Australian former cricketer. He played one first-class cricket match for Victoria in 1993.

== See also ==
- List of Victoria first-class cricketers
