= James Harrison (Australian governor) =

Governor of South Australia

Major General Sir James Harrison KCMG, CB, CBE

26th Governor of South Australia
- In office 4 December 1968 – 16 September 1971
- Monarch: Elizabeth II
- Premier: Steele Hall (1968–70); Don Dunstan (1970–71)
- Preceded by: Sir Edric Bastyan
- Succeeded by: Sir Mark Oliphant

Personal details
- Born: 25 May 1912 Camperdown, Victoria
- Died: 16 September 1971 (aged 59)
- Education: Royal Military College, Duntroon

Military service
- Allegiance: Australia
- Branch/service: Australian Army
- Years of service: 1930–1968
- Rank: Major General
- Commands: Eastern Command (1966–68); Western Command (1957–60); Officer Cadet School, Portsea (1951–54)
- Battles/wars: Second World War
- Awards: Knight Commander of the Order of St Michael and St George; Companion of the Order of the Bath; Commander of the Order of the British Empire; Mentioned in Despatches

Major General Sir James William Harrison KCMG, CB, CBE (25 May 1912 – 16 September 1971) was an Australian Army officer and the first Australian-born Governor of South Australia.

== Biography ==
James Harrison was born at Camperdown, Victoria, the second child of Victorian-born parents James Samuel Harrison, farmer, and his wife Mary Eleanor, née Harlock. He was educated at Geelong College, Melbourne High School and the Royal Military College, Duntroon, where he graduated in 1932 as an artillery specialist.

He had a varied military career including as the first Commandant of the Officer Cadet School, Portsea and culminating in becoming a member of the Military Board, as quartermaster-general (1962–63) and adjutant-general (1963–66), and General Officer Commanding (GOC) of Eastern Command, Sydney (from 1966).

He was sworn in as Governor of South Australia on 4 December 1968. His term was unremarkable. Don Dunstan later concluded: "Sir James fulfilled his role as Governor quietly and in the traditional way, and left little mark on the State".

In 1969 and 1970, both he and his wife were hospitalised, in his case with a coronary occlusion. In 1971, he and his wife set off on an overseas holiday.

Sir James died suddenly on 16 September 1971 while flying to Honolulu. He was survived by his wife and two sons, and he was cremated. His wife, born Patricia Lennox, died in 2024.

== Honours ==
He was appointed an Officer of the Order of the British Empire (OBE) in 1953 and promoted to Commander (CBE) in 1958.

He was made a Companion of the Order of the Bath (CB) in January 1968, and knighted as a Knight Commander of the Order of St Michael and St George (KCMG) in October 1968.

Government offices
| Preceded by Lieutenant General Sir Edric M. Bastyan | Governor of South Australia; 1968–1971 | Succeeded by Sir Mark Oliphant |
