= Rohan Delacombe =

British Army general and Governor of Victoria

Major-General Sir Rohan Delacombe KCMG KCVO KBE CB DSO KStJ

20th Governor of Victoria
- In office 8 May 1963 – 24 May 1974
- Monarch: Elizabeth II
- Preceded by: Sir Dallas Brooks
- Succeeded by: Sir Henry Winneke

Personal details
- Born: 25 October 1906 St. Julian's, Malta
- Died: 10 November 1991 (aged 85) Shrewton, Wiltshire, England
- Resting place: St Mary's Church, Shrewton, Wiltshire, England
- Spouse(s): Joyce, Lady Delacombe
- Nickname: "Jumbo"

Military service
- Allegiance: United Kingdom
- Branch/service: British Army
- Years of service: 1926–1962
- Rank: Major-General
- Unit: Royal Scots
- Commands: British Sector in Berlin; 52nd (Lowland) Infantry Division; 5th Infantry Brigade; 2nd Battalion, Royal Scots; 8th Battalion, Royal Scots
- Battles/wars: Arab revolt in Palestine; Second World War
- Awards: Knight Commander of the Order of St Michael and St George; Knight Commander of the Royal Victorian Order; Knight Commander of the Order of the British Empire; Companion of the Order of the Bath; Distinguished Service Order; Knight of Justice of the Order of St John; Mentioned in despatches

Major-General Sir Rohan Delacombe, KCMG, KCVO, KBE, CB, DSO, KStJ (25 October 1906 – 10 November 1991) was a senior British Army officer. After he retired from the army, he was the last British-born Governor of Victoria, Australia from 1963 to 1974.

== Early life ==
Delacombe was born in St. Julian's, Malta, on 25 October 1906, the son of Addis and Emma Louise Mary Delacombe. Addis served as a pay officer in the British Army; several generations of Delacombes, whose seat was Shrewton Manor, Wiltshire, had served in the armed forces. Rohan was educated at Harrow School and the Royal Military College, Sandhurst.

== Military career ==
After passing out from Sandhurst, Delacombe was commissioned as a second lieutenant into the Royal Scots, then the most senior line infantry regiment in the British Army, on 4 February 1926. Philip "Pip" Roberts, who was another future general officer, was among his fellow graduates. He was promoted to lieutenant on 4 February 1929. He saw service in Egypt, North China and Quetta in India (now Pakistan) with the regiment's 1st Battalion, and was promoted to captain on 2 March 1937.

Delacombe then served in Palestine with the battalion during the Arab revolt from 1937 until the outbreak of the Second World War in September 1939; he was appointed a Member of the Order of the British Empire in the 1939 King's Birthday Honours. Delacombe was posted with the 4th Infantry Brigade, then commanded by Brigadier James Gammell and one of three brigades which formed part of Major General Charles Loyd's 2nd Infantry Division. The division was part of the British Expeditionary Force (BEF), which was sent to the Franco-Belgian border following Germany's invasion of Poland. After returning to England and attending a shortened course at the Staff College, Camberley, in 1940, Delacombe assisted Major General Adrian Carton de Wiart as a General Staff Officer Grade 2 (GSO2) during the Namsos campaign in Norway.

In 1942, Delacombe was made commanding officer of the 8th Battalion, Royal Scots with the temporary rank of lieutenant colonel, and was promoted to the substantive rank of major on 4 February 1943. He led the battalion, which formed part of the 227th Infantry Brigade of Major General Gordon "Babe" MacMillan's 15th (Scottish) Infantry Division, at the Battle of Normandy in mid-1944, where his leadership earned him a Distinguished Service Order (DSO), gazetted on 19 October 1944. He was wounded and, after recovering, made commanding officer of the 2nd Battalion, Royal Scots, part of the 66th Brigade of the 1st Infantry Division, which fought in the Italian Campaign. That was followed by service in Palestine and later the Suez Canal zone.

Delacombe returned to staff duties as General Staff Officer (Grade 1) during the re-occupation of British Malaya from 1945 to 1947. He was promoted to substantive lieutenant colonel on 22 March 1948, and served as a general staff colonel at the headquarters of the British Army of the Rhine (BAOR). He was promoted to colonel on 31 December 1950 and was appointed a Commander of the Order of the British Empire in the 1951 New Year Honours. He spent much of the next 14 years from 1948 to 1962 in Germany. He served as a temporary brigadier commanding the 5th Infantry Brigade (1950–1953), and was promoted to brigadier on 16 November 1954, in which capacity he was Deputy Military Secretary for the War Office. He was promoted to temporary major general on 4 October 1955 and appointed General Officer Commanding (GOC) of the 52nd (Lowland) Infantry Division. He was made substantive major general on 29 November 1956, and appointed a Companion of the Order of the Bath in the 1957 Birthday Honours. He relinquished command of the division on 10 October 1958 and was appointed Commandant of the British Sector in Berlin on 23 March 1959. As commandant, his role included representing British interests in Spandau Prison, where Rudolf Hess was incarcerated. Knighted as a Knight Commander of the Order of the British Empire in the 1961 Birthday Honours, Delacombe relinquished his appointment as Commandant of the British Sector in Berlin on 4 May 1962, and retired from the army on 27 July.

== Governor of Victoria ==
Delacombe was appointed as Governor of Victoria in Australia in 1963, and was appointed a Knight Commander of the Order of St Michael and St George in the 1964 New Year Honours. As governor, he was made an honorary colonel in the Australian Army's 1st Armoured Regiment.

In 1967, Delacombe was petitioned to exercise the Royal prerogative of mercy on behalf of the Queen, to commute the execution of Ronald Ryan. Four members of the jury had submitted a guilty verdict, in the belief that capital punishment had been abolished in Victoria, and that Ryan's sentence would be commuted to life imprisonment. These jurors then petitioned the governor to save Ryan after it became apparent that Premier Henry Bolte was determined he should hang. Delacombe called a meeting with the Victorian cabinet, at which it was unanimously agreed that the execution should proceed. Ryan was hanged on 3 February 1967, the last person in Australia to be executed.

Delacombe's term ended in 1974.

== Death and memorials ==
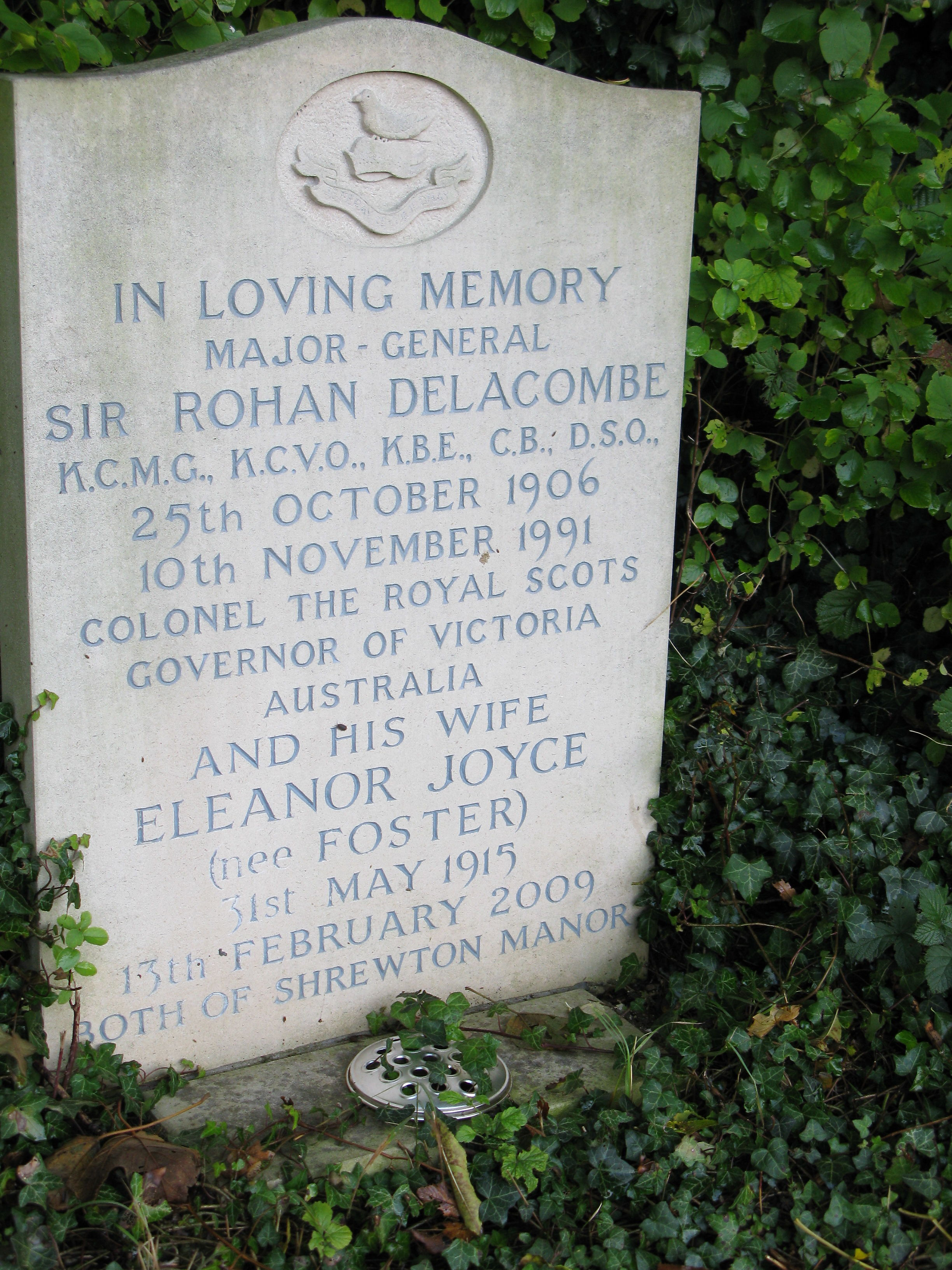
Headstone for Sir Rohan and Eleanor Delacombe, St Mary's, Shrewton.

Delacombe died on 10 November 1991 at his home at Shrewton, England, and was buried in the churchyard at the parish church, St Mary's.

Delacombe, a new suburb of Ballarat, was named in his honour in 1965 during his tenure as Governor of Victoria.

Delacombe ceremoniously opened several structures, conferences and events across Victoria including:

- Kilmore Memorial Hall, Kilmore (August 1963)
- Djerriwarrh Creek Dam, Melton (December 1963)
- Annual conference of the National Association of Geography Students (January 1964)
- Municipal centre, Maldon (December 1964)
- Science block at Assumption College, Kilmore (March 1964)
- Peters Ice Cream headquarters, Mulgrave (May 1964)
- The 1964 Royal Melbourne Show (September 1964)
- The 1965 Royal Melbourne Show (September 1965)
- The 102nd season opening of the Melbourne Bowling Club (September 1965)
- Microbiology laboratories at Melbourne University (September 1965)
- Building Appeal for the Spastic Children's Society (July 1966)
- The 1966 Australian International Catamaran Week (April 1966)
- Christian Brothers Parade College, Bundoora (February 1968)
- The 1968 Melbourne Motor Show (March 1968)
- The 1969 Red Cross Appeal (March 1969)
- The 1969 Heart Fund Appeal (May 1969)
- The St. Paul's & Villa Marie Appeal for the Blind (October 1969)
- Yooralla School for Crippled Children GTV-9 Telethon (February 1970)
- The Victoria League for Commonwealth Friendship conference (August 1970)
- Meeting of the Asian-Pacific division of the International Society of Haematology (May 1971)
- Inaugural Eaglehawk Dahlia & Arts Festival (March 1972)
- Australian Road Research Board headquarters, Vermont South (November 1972)
- St Kilda Library, St Kilda (May 1973)

Military offices
Preceded by George Collingwood	GOC 52nd (Lowland) Infantry Division; 1955–1958	Succeeded by John Macdonald
Preceded by Francis Rome	Commandant, British Sector in Berlin; 1959–1962	Succeeded by Claude Dunbar
Honorary titles
Preceded by Richard Crockatt	Colonel of the Royal Scots (The Royal Regiment); 1956–1964	Succeeded by William Campbell
Government offices
Preceded by Sir Dallas Brooks	Governor of Victoria; 1963–1974	Succeeded by Sir Henry Winneke
