= 1967 in Australia =

- Monarch: Elizabeth II
- Governor-General: Lord Casey
- Prime minister: Harold Holt, then John McEwen
- Population: 11,912,253
- Australian of the Year: The Seekers
- Elections: VIC, Referendum, Half-Senate

The following lists events that happened during 1967 in Australia.

- Decades: 1940s; 1950s; 1960s; 1970s; 1980s
- See also: 1967 in Australian literature; Other events of 1967; Timeline of Australian history

== Incumbents ==
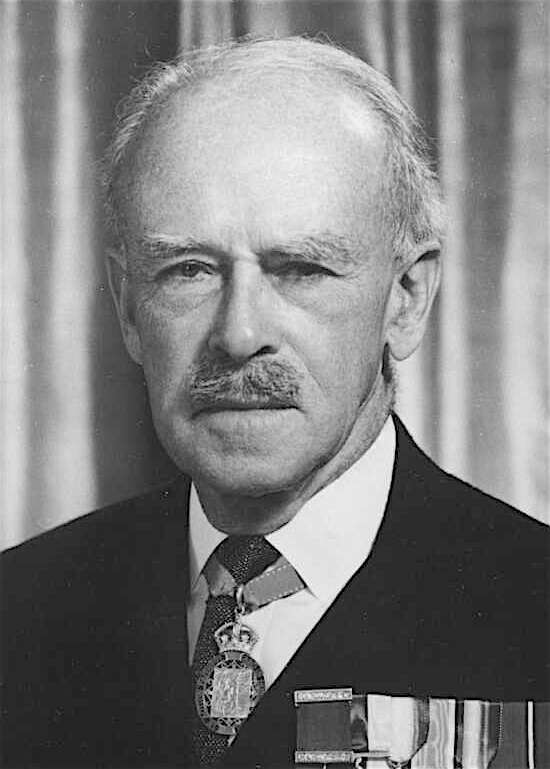
Lord Casey

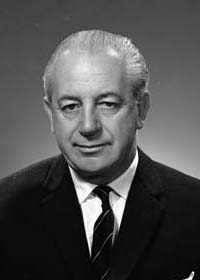
Harold Holt

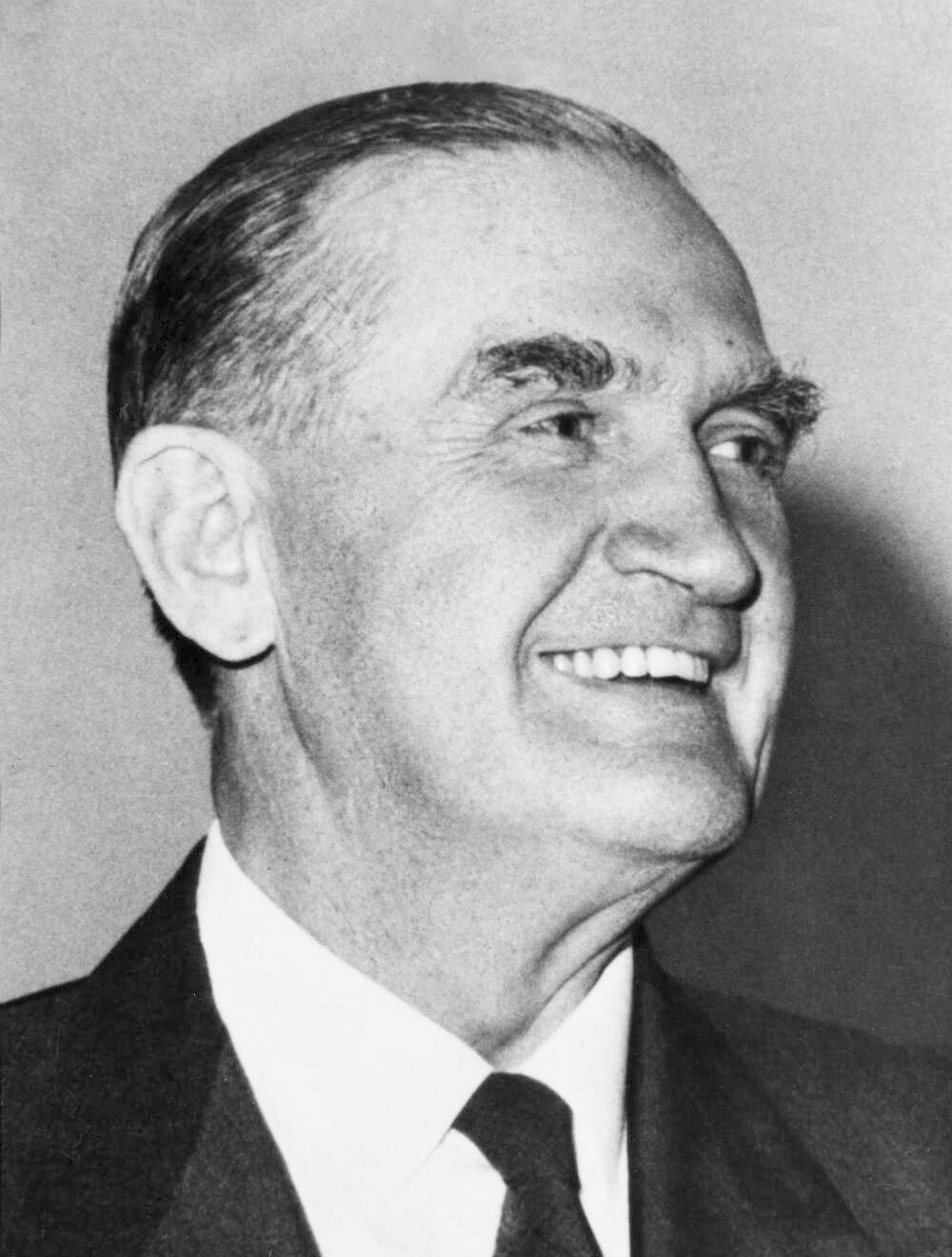
John McEwen

- Monarch – Elizabeth II
- Governor-General – Lord Casey
- Prime Minister – Harold Holt (until 17 December), then John McEwen (from 19 December)
  - Opposition Leader – Arthur Calwell (until 9 February), then Gough Whitlam
- Chief Justice – Sir Garfield Barwick

=== State and territory leaders ===
- Premier of New South Wales – Robert Askin
  - Opposition Leader – Jack Renshaw
- Premier of Queensland – Frank Nicklin
  - Opposition Leader – Jack Houston
- Premier of South Australia – Frank Walsh (until 1 June), then Don Dunstan
  - Opposition Leader – Steele Hall
- Premier of Tasmania – Eric Reece
  - Opposition Leader – Angus Bethune
- Premier of Victoria – Sir Henry Bolte
  - Opposition Leader – Clive Stoneham (until 15 May), then Clyde Holding
- Premier of Western Australia – David Brand
  - Opposition Leader – John Tonkin

=== Governors and administrators ===
- Governor of New South Wales – Sir Roden Cutler
- Governor of Queensland – Sir Alan Mansfield
- Governor of South Australia – Lieutenant General Sir Edric Bastyan
- Governor of Tasmania – General Sir Charles Gairdner
- Governor of Victoria – Major General Sir Rohan Delacombe
- Governor of Western Australia – Major General Sir Douglas Kendrew
- Administrator of Nauru – Leslie King
- Administrator of Norfolk Island – Reginald Marsh
- Administrator of the Northern Territory – Roger Dean
- Administrator of Papua and New Guinea – David Hay (from 9 January)

== Events ==
=== January ===
- 18 January – The Prime Minister of South Vietnam Nguyen Cao Ky begins a controversial visit to Australia. He is welcomed by supporters of South Vietnam but is then constantly heckled by anti-war protesters, and Harold Holt is forced to deny that Ky and his supporters are corrupt and were responsible for murdering his predecessor, President Ngo Dinh Diem.

=== February ===
- First student intake at Macquarie University.
- 3 February – Ronald Ryan becomes the last man hanged in Australia; he was executed for the murder of prison warder George Hodson while escaping from Pentridge Prison on 19 December 1965.
- 7 February – Black Tuesday in Tasmania – massive bushfires devastate much of the Tasmanian capital of Hobart and surrounding areas.
- 8 February – Gough Whitlam defeats Dr Jim Cairns and Frank Crean to replace the retiring Arthur Calwell as leader of the federal Australian Labor Party.

=== March ===
- 1 March – The Royal Australian Navy replaces the British White Ensign flag on all its ships with the Australian White Ensign.
- 1 March – The Duke of Edinburgh visits Australia.
- 8 March – La Trobe University is officially opened.
- 13 March – Bessie Rischbieth protested against the Mounts Bay reclamation project on the Swan River and the building of the Narrows Bridge and dies.

=== April ===
- 4 April – The Australian government announces it will not ban the oral contraceptive pill, maintaining that the risk of thrombosis is "very slight".
- 7 April – Australian military adviser Major Peter Badcoe is killed in action in Vietnam during an operation in Hương Trà District with the 1st ARVN Division Reaction Company.
- 12 April – Australian Roman Catholic bishops publicly declare their opposition to the war in Vietnam.
- 29 April – A majority in the New England region of New South Wales voted against the creation of a new state in the referendum.

=== May ===
- 25 May – The report by the Tasmanian Hydro Electric Commission on the Gordon Power scheme was tabled in parliament and the Government of Tasmania sought approval for $100 million funding.
- 27 May – Indigenous Australians (technically only the Aboriginal race – see Australian referendum, 1967 (Aboriginals)) are given the right to be counted in the national census after a national referendum and legislation changing citizenship laws, but voters reject a third referendum question about breaking the nexus between the sizes of the Senate and the House of Representatives.
- 29 May – The new Australian 5-dollar note goes into circulation.

=== June ===
- 1 June – Don Dunstan succeeds Frank Walsh as Premier of South Australia, after Walsh retires under pressure from his party.
- 7 June – Launceston, Tasmania, records the highest barometric pressure on record for Australia with a reading of 1044.3 millibars or 30.84 inHg.
- 25 June – Sydney underworld figure Richard Gabriel Reilly is murdered.
- 29 June – The Tasmanian Government passes a Bill revoking the national park status of Lake Pedder, allowing the Hydro Electric Commission to construct a dam flooding the lake.

=== July ===
- 1 July – The postcode system of postal address coding is introduced throughout Australia.

=== August ===
- 1 August – Qantas drops the word 'Empire' from its name.

=== September ===
- 9 September – Proposed changes to Queensland laws governing public demonstrations results in 3,500 people protesting in the streets of Brisbane. Queensland Police arrest 114 people.
- 16 September – The U.S. Naval Communication Station North West Cape near Exmouth, Western Australia is declared operational.
- 28 September – amendments to the South Australian Licensing Act came into effect ending the era of the Six o'clock swill in Australia

=== October ===
- 1 October – The NSW National Parks & Wildlife Service is established.
- 20 October – Australia unlinks the Australian dollar from British currency, when the British government makes a decision to devalue the pound sterling.

=== November ===
- 10 November – The Nauru Independence Act 1967 received royal assent, allowing the Australian-administered UN Trust Territory of Nauru to proceed to independence on 31 January 1968.
- 27 November – Singer John Farnham, then known as Johnny Farnham, releases Sadie (The Cleaning Lady). It was his first Number 1.

=== December ===
- 14 December – South Australia's Simpson Desert Conservation Park and Queensland's Simpson Desert National Park are proclaimed.
- 17 December – Prime Minister Harold Holt disappears while swimming in heavy surf at Cheviot Beach, near Portsea, Victoria.
- 19 December – Following the disappearance and presumed death of Holt, Country Party leader John McEwen is sworn in as interim Prime Minister pending the election of a new government leader by the Coalition parties.
- 20 December – John McEwen announced he will not serve in a government led by Liberal Party deputy leader William McMahon, Harold Holt's presumed successor, triggering a leadership crisis for the Coalition.

=== Unknown and general dates ===
- Holden exports its 100,000th car and launches its first compact sedan, the Torana.
- Sydney is rocked by a series of brutal underworld killings as rival gangs battle for control of the city's lucrative gambling and prostitution rackets
- Bomber aircraft from No. 2 Squadron RAAF Canberra are deployed to Phan Rang airbase in South Vietnam
- Federal Cabinet decides to drop the word 'British' from the cover of Australian passports, and agrees that it will have to amend the Nationality and Citizenship Act to change the designation 'British subject' on the inside of passports.
- Australia Square Tower, Australia's first true skyscraper, is completed.
- In an exceptionally dry year across Victoria, South Australia and southwestern New South Wales, Melbourne records only 332.3 millimetres (13.08 in) and Adelaide only 257.8 millimetres (10.15 in), in both cases this being the driest year on record by a substantial margin.
- Acquisition of Land Act 1967 is passed by the Parliament of Queensland

== Science and technology ==
- 17 March – Honeysuckle Creek Tracking Station is opened near Canberra.
- April – Dung beetles released between Broome, Western Australia and Townsville, Queensland in the Australian Dung Beetle Project, led by Dr. George Bornemissza of the CSIRO in an attempt to control the buffalo fly.
- 1 May – Health authorities begin the first national polio immunisation campaign using the new Sabin oral vaccine developed by Dr Jonas Salk.
- 29 November – Australia's first satellite, WRESAT, is launched on an American Redstone rocket from Woomera, South Australia.

== Culture ==
=== Arts and literature ===
- 26 July – The Groop wins Hoadley's Battle of the Sounds
- 30 July – Melbourne's La Mama Theatre opens.
- 1 November – National Gallery of Australia established by the Commonwealth Government with an announcement by prime minister Harold Holt that the Government would construct the building
- November – The song "Sadie (The Cleaning Lady)" sung by Johnny Farnham is released.
- December – National Gallery of Victoria building designed by Roy Grounds opens
- Thomas Keneally's novel Bring Larks and Heroes wins the Miles Franklin Award
- Joan Lindsay's Picnic at Hanging Rock is published
- Judy Cassab's portrait of Margo Lewers wins the Archibald Prize
- Museum of the Riverina established in Wagga Wagga, New South Wales
- Christina Stead's Cotters' England published
- John Brack's Nude With Dressing Gown is painted

=== Film ===
- Interaction: Moving and Painting (dir. Gil Brealy) wins the AFI Award for Best Film
- Journey Out of Darkness (dir. James Trainor)
- The Pudding Thieves (dir. Brian Davies)
- Robbery (dir. Peter Yates)
- Shades Of Puffing Billy (dir. Antonio Colacino)
- Wheels Across A Wilderness (dir. Malcolm Leyland)
- Forgotten Cinema (dir. Anthony Buckley), the influential documentary about the rise and fall of the Australian feature film industry

=== Television ===
- 10 April – The ninth Logie Awards are held on board the TSS Fairstar cruise ship. Graham Kennedy wins his third Gold Logie.
- 10 April – This Day Tonight, Australia's first national nightly TV current affairs program, premieres on ABC-TV, hosted by Bill Peach.
- 25 June – The ABC participates in the historic Our World broadcast, the world's first live, international, satellite television production.
- 5 July – The Seven Network premieres a new situation comedy series My Name's McGooley, What's Yours? starring Gordon Chater, John Meillon and Judi Farr, and the Nine Network premiered the spy drama Hunter, starring Tony Ward.
- 15 June – ATV0 broadcasts the first colour television program in Australia when it televises the horse racing from Pakenham, Victoria.
- 28 August – The popular ABC soap opera Bellbird begins its ten-year run.
- 11 September – The children's television show Adventure Island begins airing on the ABC.
- 16 September – The first live telecast of a football grand final in Australia was the screening of the 1967 NSWRFL season's grand final between Canterbury-Bankstown and South Sydney at the Sydney Cricket Ground.

== Sport ==
=== Athletics (track and field) ===
- 27 March – Bill Howard from Wodonga won the Stawell Gift starting from 5 3/4 yards in a time of 11.6 seconds
- 28 June – Judy Pollock breaks Ann Packer's world record (2:04.3) in the women's 800 metres, clocking 2:01.0 at a meet in Helsinki, Finland.
- 9 September – Derek Clayton wins his first men's national marathon title, clocking 2:21:58 in Adelaide.

=== Australian rules football ===
- 23 September – Richmond defeats Geelong 16.18 (114) to 15.15 (105) in front of 109,396 people to win the 1967 Victorian Football League Grand Final
- Ross Smith of St Kilda wins the 1967 Brownlow Medal
- Sturt Football Club won the 1967 South Australian National Football League grand final, defeating Port Adelaide 13.10 (88) to 10.17 (77)
- Perth defeats East Perth 18.12 (120) to 15.12 (102) in front of 42,625 people to win the Western Australian National Football League grand final
- North Hobart wins the Tasmanian National Football League, defeating Glenorchy 11.12 (78) to 8.16 (64)

=== Cricket ===
- The Australian cricket team, captained by Bob Simpson toured South Africa in 1966–67, losing the Test series 3–1
- Victoria win the 1966–67 Sheffield Shield

=== Golf ===
- Peter Thomson won the Australian Open
- Peter Thomson won the Australian PGA Championship, played at the Metropolitan Golf Club in Melbourne

=== Motor racing ===
- Jack Brabham was named 1966 Australian Man of the Year and the Queen awarded him Order of the British Empire
- Jackie Stewart driving for the British Racing Motors team won the Australian Grand Prix held at Warwick Farm Racecourse
- Harry Firth and Fred Gibson won the Bathurst 500 driving a Ford XR Falcon GT. This was Firth's fourth Bathurst victory

=== Rugby league ===
- 16 September – South Sydney defeats Canterbury Bankstown 12–10 in front of 56,358 people to win the 1967 New South Wales Rugby League Grand Final.
- The Penrith Panthers and the Cronulla-Sutherland Sharks are introduced into the New South Wales Rugby League competition.
- The newly founded Cronulla-Sutherland team finish in last position in the New South Wales Rugby League competition, claiming the wooden spoon.
- Brothers defeats Northern Suburbs 6–2 to win the 1967 Brisbane Rugby League premiership.

=== Rugby union ===
- The All Blacks defeat Australia 29–9 to retain the Bledisloe Cup.

=== Squash ===
- The first Squash racquets international championship is held and won by Australia.

=== Tennis ===
- 8 July – John Newcombe wins the men's singles at Wimbledon, defeating Germany's Wilhelm Bungert 6–3 6–1 6–1.
- 10 September – John Newcombe wins the men's singles at the US Open, defeating the USA's Clark Graebner 6–4 6–4 8–6.
- Roy Emerson defeats Arthur Ashe 6–4 6–1 6–4 in the men's singles final at the Australian Open.
- Nancy Gunter defeats Lesley Turner Bowrey 6–1, 6–4 in the women's singles final at the Australian Open.

=== Yachting ===
- 18 November – Dame Pattie, Australian challenger for the America's Cup was defeated by the American defender Intrepid which won the series 4–0.
- 30 December – Pen Duick III (France) won line honours in the 1967 Sydney to Hobart Yacht Race in a time of 4:04:10:31. Rainbow II (New Zealand) is the overall winner.

=== Other ===
- 3 March – The Duke of Edinburgh laid a foundation stone for a new Western Stand at the Melbourne Cricket Ground, which was completed in 1968 (known as the Ponsford Stand after 1986).
- 7 November – Red Handed, ridden by Roy Higgins and trained by Bart Cummings wins the 1967 Melbourne Cup in a time of 3:20:40.
- 14 November - Australia wins the men's association football South Vietnam Independence Cup in Saigon in the final against South Korea.
- The Manchester United football team tours Australia.

== Births ==
- 4 January – David Wilson, rugby player
- 7 January – Ricky Stuart, rugby player, coach, and sportscaster
- 8 January – Steven Jacobs, television host and actor
- 13 January – Annie Jones, actress
- 3 February – Aurelio Vidmar, soccer player
- 16 February – Paul Paddick, singer and actor (The Wiggles)
- 3 April – Mark Skaife, racing driver
- 9 April – Graeme Lloyd, baseball player
- 11 April – Lachlan Dreher, field hockey goalkeeper
- 17 April – Barnaby Joyce, politician
- 23 April – Rob Pyne, politician
- 2 May
  - Rob J. Hyndman, statistician
  - Kerryn McCann, athlete (d. 2008)
- 5 May – Danny Kah, ice speed skater
- 7 May – Martin Bryant, perpetrator of the Port Arthur massacre
- 14 May – Shaun Creighton, long-distance runner
- 15 May – James Bradley, author
- 20 May – Aaron Harper, politician
- 29 May – Jim McDonald, politician
- 30 May – Rechelle Hawkes, field hockey player
- 31 May – Stephen Silvagni, Aussie rules footballer
- 20 June – Nicole Kidman, American-born actress
- 24 June – Tracey Belbin, field hockey player and coach
- 3 July
  - Tony Briggs, actor, writer and producer
  - Michael Bruce McKenzie, freestyle swimmer
- 5 July – Robert J. Kral, composer
- 12 July – Martin Lynes, actor
- 17 July – Peter Lonard, golfer
- 30 July – Victor Dominello, politician
- 9 August – Lars Kleppich, sailor
- 8 September – James Packer, businessman
- 4 October – Nick Green, rower
- 5 October – Guy Pearce, actor
- 13 October – David Gibson, politician
- 26 October – Keith Urban, New Zealand-born country music singer
- 28 October – Mark Taylor, politician
- 1 November – Tina Arena, singer
- 29 November – Sean Carlin, hammer thrower
- 16 December – Miranda Otto, actress
- 22 December – Paul Morris, racing driver and businessman
- 28 December – Paul Foster, football (soccer) player

=== Undated ===
- Mark Salmon, surf lifesaver

== Deaths ==
- 4 January – Ezra Norton (born 1897), newspaper proprietor
- 22 January – James Alexander Allan (born 1879), poet
- 3 February
  - Ronald Ryan (born 1925), last person hanged in Australia
  - Eric Edgley (born 1899), theatre performer and impresario
- 7 February – David Unaipon (born 1872), Aboriginal author and inventor
- 9 February – Fred Hoysted (born 1883), racehorse trainer
- 13 March – Bessie Rischbieth (born 1874), feminist and social activist
- 14 March – Ernest Henry Burgmann (born 1885), Anglican bishop and social critic
- 29 March – D'Arcy Niland (born 1917), author of The Shiralee
- 7 April – Peter Badcoe (born 1934), soldier and Victoria Cross winner
- 24 April – Robert Richards (born 1885), Premier of South Australia
- 24 April – Eric Baume (born 1900), journalist, author and broadcaster – first "beast" on the talk show Beauty and the Beast
- 13 May – Lance Sharkey (born 1898), Communist activist
- 15 May – Jessie Traill (born 1881), artist
- 13 June – Gerald Patterson (born 1895), tennis player
- 18 June – Clive Latham Baillieu, 1st Baron Baillieu (born 1889), Businessman and public servant
- 2 July – Ivo Whitton (born 1893), golfer
- 4 July – Ray Parer (born 1894), aviator
- 6 July – Joseph Maxwell (born 1896), soldier and Victoria Cross winner
- 26 July – Robert Tudawali (b. c1929), Indigenous actor
- 30 July – Arthur Stace (born 1885), pavement scribe known as Mr Eternity
- 15 August – Dave McNamara (born 1887), Australian rules footballer
- 25 August – Stanley Bruce (born 1883), eighth Prime Minister of Australia
- 25 August – Robert George (born 1896), Governor of South Australia
- 13 October – Kerr Grant (born 1878), physicist and education administrator
- 3 November – Justin Simonds (born 1890), Roman Catholic Archbishop of Melbourne
- 13 November – Helen Mayo (born 1878), pioneer in women's and children's health
- 16 November – Ernest Durack (born 1882), New South Welsh politician
- 17 December – Harold Holt (born 1908), seventeenth Prime Minister of Australia
- 29 December – Eric Woodward (born 1899), Governor of New South Wales
- 31 December – Arthur Mailey (born 1886), cricketer

== See also ==
- List of Australian films of the 1960s
