= 1964 in Australia =

- Monarch: Elizabeth II
- Governor-General: Viscount De L'Isle
- Prime minister: Sir Robert Menzies
- Australian of the Year: Dawn Fraser
- Elections: TAS, VIC, Half-Senate

The following lists events that happened during 1964 in Australia.

- Decades: 1940s; 1950s; 1960s; 1970s; 1980s
- See also: 1964 in Australian literature; Other events of 1964; Timeline of Australian history

== Incumbents ==
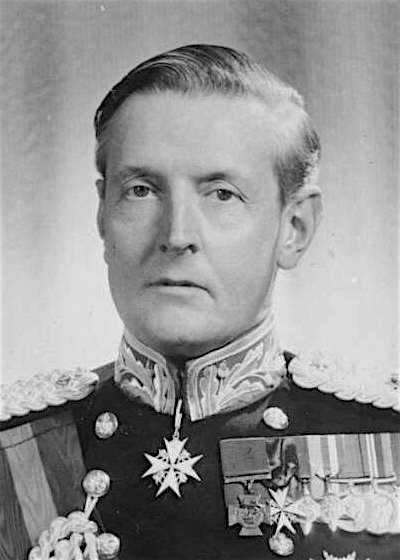
Viscount De L'Isle

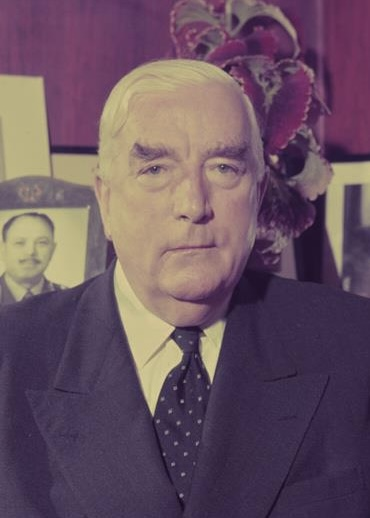
Sir Robert Menzies

- Monarch – Elizabeth II
- Governor-General – Viscount De L'Isle
- Prime Minister – Sir Robert Menzies
  - Opposition Leader – Arthur Calwell
- Chief Justice – Sir Owen Dixon (until 13 April), then Sir Garfield Barwick

=== State and territory leaders ===
- Premier of New South Wales – Bob Heffron (until 30 April), then Jack Renshaw
  - Opposition Leader – Robert Askin
- Premier of Queensland – Frank Nicklin
  - Opposition Leader – Jack Duggan
- Premier of South Australia – Sir Thomas Playford IV
  - Opposition Leader – Frank Walsh
- Premier of Tasmania – Eric Reece
  - Opposition Leader – Angus Bethune
- Premier of Victoria – Henry Bolte
  - Opposition Leader – Clive Stoneham
- Premier of Western Australia – David Brand
  - Opposition Leader – Albert Hawke

=== Governors and administrators ===
- Governor of New South Wales – Lieutenant General Sir Eric Woodward
- Governor of Queensland – Colonel Sir Henry Abel Smith
- Governor of South Australia – Lieutenant General Sir Edric Bastyan
- Governor of Tasmania – General Sir Charles Gairdner
- Governor of Victoria – Major General Sir Rohan Delacombe
- Governor of Western Australia – Major General Sir Douglas Kendrew
- Administrator of Nauru – Reginald Leydin
- Administrator of Norfolk Island – Robert Wordsworth, then Roger Nott
- Administrator of the Northern Territory – Roger Nott (until 1 October), then Roger Dean
- Administrator of Papua and New Guinea – Sir Donald Cleland

== Events ==
=== January ===
- 29 January – The Royal Australian Air Force takes delivery of its first two Mirage fighter jets.
- 31 January – Seven infants are killed in the nursery fire tragedy in the Melbourne suburb of Templestowe.

=== February ===
- 3 February –
  - Cyclone Dora strikes the west coast of Cape York Peninsula causing extensive damage to the Edward River and Mitchell River Aboriginal missions.
  - The first double-decker carriages begin trial runs on the Sydney rail network.
- 10 February –
  - 82 people are killed in the Melbourne–Voyager collision in Jervis Bay when the aircraft carrier HMAS Melbourne and the destroyer HMAS Voyager collide.
  - A 16-year-old boy drowns when he is caught in a rip at Bilgola Beach.

=== March ===
- 5 March – 25-year-old Barry Rodrick is found guilty by a jury of murdering 12-year-old Monica Ann Schofield near the Sydney suburb of Hammondville on 17 June 1963 and is sentenced to life imprisonment.
- 10 March – Sir Percy Spender is appointed President of the International Court of Justice.
- 27 March – There is a split in the Communist Party of Australia and the Communist Party of Australia (Marxist-Leninist) is formed.

=== April ===
- 2 April – 49-year-old UWA lecturer Maurice Bernard Benn is found guilty by a jury of murdering his four-year-old son Bernard Wolfgang Benn and is sentenced to death. His sentence is later commuted to ten years imprisonment. Instead of condemning his actions, the university instead offers their support to Benn vowing to offer continued employment upon his release from prison.
- 9 April – The Menzies government refuses to ratify the International Labour Organization convention on equal pay for women.
- 8 April – The 191 miles (307 km) Moonie oil pipeline to Lytton Oil Refinery opens
- 21 April –
  - Hanna Neumann is named professor and chair of pure mathematics at the Australian National University in Canberra, becoming the first female professor of pure mathematics at an Australian university and the first woman to be appointed to a chair at ANU.
  - Judy Hanrahan becomes the first female bank teller appointed by the Bank of NSW since World War II, taking up the position at the Collins Street branch in Melbourne.
- 23 April — Federal Liberal Party politician Sir Garfield Barwick is announced as the new Chief Justice of the High Court of Australia, succeeding Sir Owen Dixon who resigned on 13 April. Prime minister Robert Menzies said Barwick had already resigned from the House of Representatives and is "taking steps" to resign as the Minister for External Affairs.
- 29 April — Lake Burley Griffin reaches filled maximum level for the first time.

=== May ===
- 14 May – A Royal Australian Navy helicopter with a crew of four onboard makes a forced landing on a sports oval in the Wollongong suburb of Cringila after its engine cuts out flying over the Port Kembla steelworks.

=== June ===
- June – Macquarie University founded
- 12–30 June – The Beatles' 1964 world tour in Australia and New Zealand.
- 13 June – Two gasfitters and a co-proprietor of a Sydney coffee shop in George Street are killed when a gas pipe ruptured as they were attempting to identify a gas leak in the cellar of the Cuba Coffee Inn. Five others are hospitalised including two ambulance officers while eight others were treated for slight gas poisoning.

=== July ===
- 6 July – Warrant Officer Class 2, Kevin Conway of the Australian Army Training Team becomes the first Vietnam War battle casualty when he is killed during a Viet Cong attack on the Nam Đông special forces post in Thừa Thiên Huế province.
- 15 July – The first edition of The Australian is published in Canberra, Australia's first national daily newspaper, published by Rupert Murdoch's News Limited.
- 17 July – Donald Campbell sets new land speed record of 429 miles per hour in his jet-propelled car "Bluebird" at Lake Eyre, South Australia.

=== August ===
- 4 August – 25-year-old railway porter David Herman Mason is found guilty by a jury of murdering his 15-month-old daughter Rowena Dorelle Mason in Lithgow, New South Wales on 16 April 1964 and is sentenced to life imprisonment.
- 8 August – The 1964 Waratah state by-election is held in New South Wales which was triggered by the death of Labor's Edward Greaves. The by-election is won by independent candidate Frank Purdue, the lord mayor of Newcastle.
- 17 August – The Tasman Bridge across the Derwent River opens in Hobart.

=== September ===
- 23 September – The publishers of Sydney's satirical Oz magazine (Richard Neville, Richard Walsh, Martin Sharp and Alfred James) are all convicted with printing an obscene publication. Neville and Walsh are both sentenced to six months gaol, Sharp is sentenced to four months gaol while James is fined £50. However, they successfully appeal their sentences and have their convictions quashed on 11 February 1966.

=== October ===
- 2 October – The Gladesville Bridge, then the world's longest concrete arch is officially opened in Sydney by Princess Marina of Greece and Denmark.
- 17 October — Prime Minister Robert Menzies inaugurates Lake Burley Griffin, Canberra.
- 26 October – Notorious Perth serial killer Eric Edgar Cooke is executed at Fremantle Prison becoming the last person to be hanged in Western Australia.

=== November ===
- 10 November – Prime Minister Robert Menzies announces the reintroduction of National Service.

=== December ===
- 10 December – The Queensland government declares a state of emergency in an attempt to end the Mount Isa Mines dispute.
- 16 December – Melbourne's La Trobe University is founded
- 31 December – Donald Campbell sets new water speed record of 276 miles per hour at Dumbleyung Lake, Western Australia.

== Arts and literature ==
- Donald Horne's The Lucky Country published.
- Kath Walker's We Are Going published.
- My Brother Jack by George Johnston is awarded the Miles Franklin Literary Award.

== Television ==
- 1 August – The launch of ATV-0 marks the birth of the third commercial television network, now known as Network Ten.
- 3 October – Singer Johnny Chester hosts a new show on Melbourne's ABV-2 called Teen Scene, which also features his backing group The Chessmen as the house band.
- 20 October – Police drama Homicide premieres on Melbourne's HSV-7, beginning a 12-year run setting the pace for Australian television drama.
- 11 November – The Mavis Bramston Show premieres on ATN-7 in Sydney.

== Sport ==
- 23 February – South Australia wins the 1963–64 Sheffield Shield season, defeating Victoria by an innings and 46 runs.
- 17 May – Midget Farrelly wins the first World Surfboard Championship at Manly Beach while Phyllis O'Donnell wins the women's title.
- 18 July – Robert Vagg wins the men's national marathon title, clocking 2:24:06.2 in Sydney.
- 19 September –
  - St. George win the 1964 NSWRFL season Grand Final, winning their ninth straight premiership after defeating Balmain 11–6 at the SCG. Canterbury-Bankstown finish in last position, claiming the wooden spoon.
  - Melbourne win the 1964 VFL grand final defeating Collingwood by four points.
- 13 October – Dawn Fraser wins Australia's first gold medal at the 1964 Tokyo Olympics when she wins the women's 100 metre freestyle event.
- 15 October – Ian O'Brien wins gold in the men's 200 metre breastroke event at the 1964 Tokyo Olympics.
- 17 October –
  - Robert Windle wins gold in the men's 1500 metre freestyle event at the 1964 Tokyo Olympics.
  - Betty Cuthbert wins gold in the women's 400 metre athletics event at the 1964 Tokyo Olympics.
- 18 October – Kevin Berry wins gold in the men's 200 metre butterfly event at the 1964 Tokyo Olympics.
- 21 October – William Northam, Peter O'Donnell and James Sargeant win gold in the men's 5.5 metre sailing event at the 1964 Tokyo Olympics.
- 24 October –
  - Australia places 8th in the 1964 Tokyo Olympics with a total of 18 medals (6 gold, 2 silver and 10 bronze).
  - Dawn Fraser becomes the first Australian athlete to carry the Australian flag at an Olympics closing ceremony.
- 3 November – Polo Prince wins the Melbourne Cup.
- 30 December – Freya is declared the winner of the 1964 Sydney to Hobart Yacht Race while Astor takes line honours.

== Births ==
- 15 January – Scott Emerson, politician
- 16 January – Chris Dittmar, squash player
- 25 January – Mark McPhee, cricketer (died 1999)
- 25 February – Dale Last, politician
- 3 March – Sandy Bolton, politician
- 4 March – Karen Knowles, entertainer
- 13 March
  - Stephen Bennett, politician
  - Trevor Gillmeister, rugby league player
- 26 March – Martin Bella, rugby league player
- 8 April – Michael Caltabiano, politician
- 15 April – Lee Kernaghan, country singer/songwriter
- 19 April – Peter Jackson, rugby league player (died 1997)
- 30 April – Ian Healy, cricket player and commentator
- 2 May – John Hathaway, politician
- 19 May – Peter Jackson, rugby league player (died 1997)
- 28 May – Jeff Fenech, boxer and trainer
- 3 June – Matthew Ryan, equestrian
- 7 June – Gia Carides, actress
- 9 June – Jane Kennedy, actress and comedian
- 11 June – Carl Barron, comedian
- 22 June – Tom Crebbin, Australian rules football player
- 23 June – Tara Morice, actress, singer, and dancer
- 1 July – Clayton Lamb, Australian rules football player
- 4 July – Martin Flood, quiz show winner
- 13 July – Leanne Benjamin, ballet dancer
- 3 August – Michael Healy, politician
- 4 August – Andrew Bartlett, politician
- 5 August – Dale Shuttleworth, politician
- 10 August – Andy Caldecott, motorcycle racer (died 2006)
- 14 August – Jason Dunstall, Australian Rules football player
- 19 August – Dermott Brereton, Australian Rules football player
- 5 September – Frank Farina, soccer player and manager
- 11 September – Kathy Watt, cyclist
- 16 September – Chris Franklin, comedian
- 27 October – Mark Taylor, cricket player and commentator
- 28 October – Darius Perkins, actor (died 2019)
- 29 October
  - Eddie McGuire, businessman and television presenter
  - Jackie Pereira, field hockey striker
- 9 November – Mark Dalton, basketball player
- 19 November – Peter Rohde, Australian Rules football player
- 23 November – Marilyn Kidd, rower
- 9 December – Larry Emdur, television presenter
- 16 December
  - Georgie Parker, actress
  - Gabrielle Upton, politician
- 22 December – Sam Cox, politician

== Deaths ==
- 15 January – Harry Sunderland, rugby league administrator (born 1889)
- 23 January – Claude Hulbert, British actor (born 1900)
- 12 February – Arthur Upfield, author (born 1890)
- 27 February – Orry-Kelly, costume designer (born 1897)
- 18 April – Wilfred Mibus, Victorian politician (born 1900)
- 19 October – Nettie Palmer, author (born 1885)

== See also ==
- List of Australian films of the 1960s
