= 1958 in Australia =

- Monarch: Elizabeth II
- Governor-General: William Slim
- Prime minister: Robert Menzies
- Population: 9,842,333
- Elections: Federal, VIC

The following lists events that happened during 1958 in Australia.

- Decades: 1930s; 1940s; 1950s; 1960s; 1970s
- See also: 1958 in Australian literature; Other events of 1958; Federal election; Timeline of Australian history

== Incumbents ==
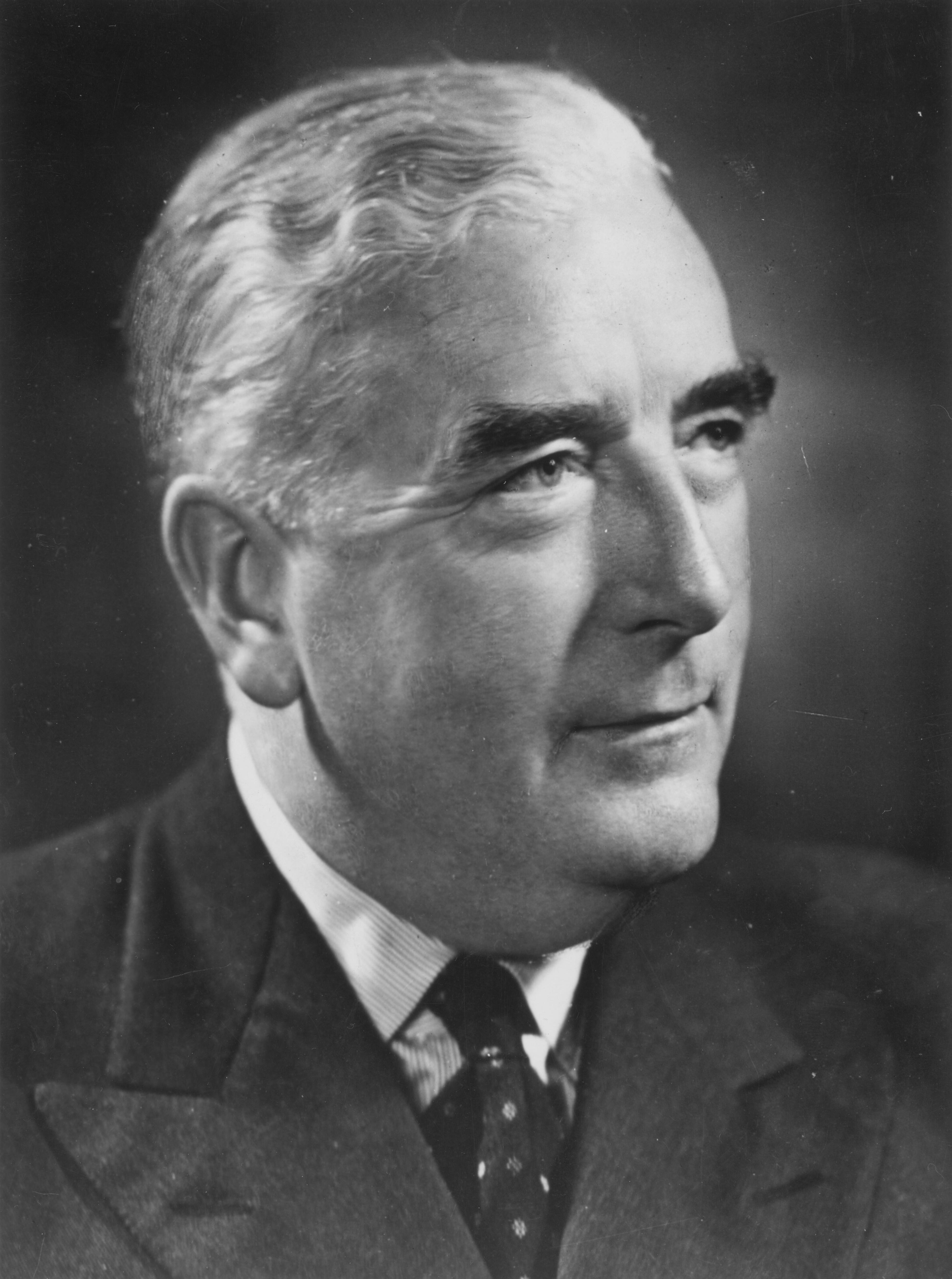
Robert Menzies

- Monarch – Elizabeth II
- Governor-General – Sir William Slim
- Prime Minister – Robert Menzies
- Chief Justice – Sir Owen Dixon

=== State premiers ===
- Premier of New South Wales – Joseph Cahill
- Premier of Queensland – Frank Nicklin
- Premier of South Australia – Thomas Playford IV
- Premier of Tasmania – Robert Cosgrove (until 26 August), then Eric Reece
- Premier of Victoria – Henry Bolte
- Premier of Western Australia – Albert Hawke

=== State governors ===
- Governor of New South Wales – Sir Eric Woodward
- Governor of Queensland – Sir Henry Abel Smith (from 18 March)
- Governor of South Australia – Sir Robert George
- Governor of Tasmania – Sir Ronald Cross, 1st Baronet (until 4 June)
- Governor of Victoria – Sir Dallas Brooks
- Governor of Western Australia – Sir Charles Gairdner

== Events ==
=== January ===
- 14 January – Qantas Airways introduces a round-the-world air service from Australia to London.
- 20 January – The Royal Australian Naval College is moved back to Jervis Bay Territory from Flinders Naval Depot in Victoria.
- 28 January to 11 February – Harold Macmillan visits Australia, the first Prime Minister of the United Kingdom to do so while in office.

=== February ===
- 14 February to 7 March – Queen Elizabeth The Queen Mother visits Australia for the second time.

=== March ===
- 17 March – Victorian minister for education John Bloomfield discloses in state parliament that the name of Victoria's proposed second university will be Monash University in honour of General Sir John Monash.
- 24 March – Two 18-year-old men and a 19-year-old man attempt to disrupt the official opening of Sydney's new Circular Quay overhead roadway. Two of the men are armed with gardening shears and the other carrying a roll of toilet paper as they jump a railing and rush towards a party of dignitaries as New South Wales premier Joseph Cahill prepares to cut the ribbon. Before the men could reach the ribbon, police officers tackled the men who were later taken to the Phillip Street police station where all three are charged with offensive behaviour, while two of the men are charged with carrying a cutting instrument. During a speech, Cahill states that the new roadway was indicative of Sydney's growth and said he believed the new road would greatly relieve inner city traffic congestion although there was much more to be done to solve Sydney's traffic issues. The road ultimately becomes known as the Cahill Expressway after lord mayor Harry Jensen successfully proposes in August 1958 that the road should be named in Cahill's honour.
- 26 March – Leader of the Country Party, Sir Arthur Fadden formally announces his resignation as the party's leader before Minister for Trade John McEwen is unanimously elected as his successor.

=== April ===
- 1 April – William John O'Meally becomes The last person flogged in Australia in Melbourne's Pentridge Prison.
- 3 April – A cyclone destroys most of the town of Bowen in Queensland.
- 10 April –
  - Gary David Matthews, an 18-year-old gunner with the 111th Light Anti-Aircraft Battery appears in North Sydney Court of Petty Sessions charged with raping and assaulting with intent to murdering 39-year-old Victoria Joan Hawkins, wife of a British Army Major at Middle Head Army Barracks the previous day. The charge of attempted murder is subsequently dismissed the following month when the solder is committed to stand trial. Despite pleading not guilty to the charge, Matthews is found guilty in the Central Criminal Court of raping Hawkins and is sentenced to 12 years imprisonment.
  - 78-year-old former prime minister Sir Earle Page, a member of federal parliament since 1919 and now sitting on the backbench as the Member for Cowper, denies reports he intends to retire.
- 11 April – 14-year-old student Margaret Eleanor Thomas is kidnapped by a man who broke into from Burwood Methodist Ladies College in Sydney. The girl's body is found a short time later in Queen Elizabeth Park in Concord. 29-year-old labourer John Charles Smith is charged with her murder. He is also charged with having broken into a house in Burwood on 11 February 1958 and raping and inflicted grievous bodily harm on a 13-year-old girl. Smith pleads not guilty to Thomas' murder, but after a four-day trial in June 1958, he is found guilty in the Central Criminal Court and is sentenced to penal servitude for life.
- 15 April – Monash University is founded in Melbourne, Victoria.

=== May ===
- 11 May – Construction of Australia's largest man-made lake, Lake Eucumbene on the Eucumbene River in the Snowy Mountains, is completed.
- 20 May – Victorian premier Henry Bolte announces the appointment of twenty members to the interim council of Victoria's new Monash University with the appointees including Sir George Paton, Sir Leslie H. Martin and Archibald Glenn. Alice Hoy is the only woman to be appointed to the council.
- 31 May – Henry Bolte's Liberal government is re-elected in Victoria.

=== June ===
- 15 June – Two 14-year-old Blacktown Boys High School students are found alive after becoming lost in the Jamison Valley in the Blue Mountains and then spending a night in freezing conditions. They are treated at Katoomba Hospital for frostbite, exposure and shock.

=== July ===
- 19 July – The last tram service runs in Perth.

=== August ===
- 25 August – Robert Cosgrove resigns as Premier of Tasmania citing health reasons, and is succeeded by Eric Reece.

=== September ===
- 30 September – The ANZAC Day Act 1958 receives Royal Assent, making ANZAC Day (25 April) a national public holiday in Australia.

=== October ===
- 26 October – 30-year-old Thomas Reginald Sonter, a New Zealand carpenter employed on the Snowy Mountains Scheme discovers the wreckage of the Australian National Airways Avro 10 aircraft, VH-UMF Southern Cloud near Cabramurra on the western side of the Snowy Mountains, 60 miles from Cooma, New South Wales. The aircraft had been missing since it crashed in 1931.

=== November ===
- 22 November – A federal election is held. The Liberal-Country coalition led by Robert Menzies defeats H. V. Evatt's Australian Labor Party with 74 seats to 45 in the House of Representatives, a majority unprecedented since Federation, gained from preferences from the Democratic Labor Party.

=== December ===
- 21 December – A 16-year-old boy is rescued after falling into the sea from a 150 ft cliff at Torquay and washed into a small cave at the base of the cliff. During the rescue, the boy falls from the stretcher and is washed out to see when two of the lifesavers fall into a hole, with one of the men swimming out to again retrieve the boy. The boy was taken to Geelong Hospital and was discharged the following day suffering only abrasions and bruises.

=== Unknown dates ===
- Aquila Shoes, a shoe manufacturing company, founded.
- Johnny O'Keefe has his first hit with Wild One.

== Science and technology ==
- 26 January – The HIFAR nuclear reactor at Lucas Heights goes critical for the first time.

=== Unknown dates ===
- Australian engineer Dr. David Warren of Melbourne's Aeronautical Research Laboratories constructs the world's first flight recorder ("black box").

== Arts, music and literature ==
- 25 February – Eric Smith wins the Blake Prize for Religious Art with his work The Moment Christ Died.
- 2 March – Sydney radio station 2UE publishes Australia's first ever Top 40 music chart.
- 2 April – Patrick White is announced as the inaugural Miles Franklin Award winner, awarded the prize for his novel Voss. The award is presented to White by prime minister Robert Menzies who described the novel as a "quite remarkable work".
- December –
  - Randolph Stow releases To the Islands, which earns him the 1958 Miles Franklin Award, as announced in April 1959.
  - Russel Ward releases The Australian Legend.
- 12 December – Sydney cartoonist William Edwin Pidgeon wins the Archibald Prize with his portrait of journalist Ray Walker.

== Film ==
- 8 March - The film Bridge on the River Kwai was released in Sydney.

== Television ==
- 21 May – Postmaster-General Charles Davidson officially opens ABV-2's new television studios in the Melbourne suburb of Ripponlea with the Australian Broadcasting Commission pledging that their new facilities in Melbourne will provide new opportunities for Australian artists, writers and composers.
- 20 October - Autumn Affair starring Muriel Steinbeck, the first television soap opera produced in Australia debuts on ATN-7 as part of the station's first breakfast television line-up.
- 1 November – The first episode of Bandstand goes to air on TCN-9, hosted by Brian Henderson.
- 22 November – The 1958 Australian federal election is the first to be televised with both ATN-7 and ABN-2 staging their first live election broadcasts. ABN-2's election night panel included ABC announcer Michael Charlton, the Liberal Party's Billy McMahon and the Labor Party's Eddie Ward. Commentators on the ATN-7 broadcast included Charles Cousens, newspaper journalists George Baker and Max Newton. former Liberal MP Jo Gullett and union secretary Lloyd Ross.

== Sport ==
- Athletics
  - 23 March – John Russell wins his second men's national marathon title, clocking 2:40:30 in Sydney
  - 6 August – Herb Elliott sets a world record for the one-mile dash (3:54.5) at Morton Stadium in Dublin, Ireland.
- Cricket
  - New South Wales wins the Sheffield Shield
- Football
  - Brisbane Rugby League premiership: Brothers defeated Valleys 22-7
  - New South Wales Rugby League premiership: St. George defeated Western Suburbs 20-9
  - WAFL East Perth defeated East Fremantle 65 - 63
  - South Australian National Football League premiership: won by Port Adelaide
  - Victorian Football League premiership: Collingwood defeated Melbourne 82-64
- Golf
  - Australian Open: won by Gary Player
- Horse racing
  - Sir Blink wins the Caulfield Cup
  - Yeman wins the Cox Plate
  - Skyline wins the Golden Slipper
  - Baystone wins the Melbourne Cup
- Motor racing
  - The Australian Grand Prix was held at Bathurst and won by Lex Davison driving a Ferrari
- Tennis
  - Australian Open men's singles: Ashley Cooper defeats Malcolm Anderson 7–5 6–3 6–4
  - Australian Open women's singles: Angela Mortimer defeats Lorraine Coghlan 6–3 6–4
  - Davis Cup: Australia is defeated by the United States 3–2 in the 1958 Davis Cup final
- Yachting
  - Solo takes line honours and Siandra wins on handicap in the Sydney to Hobart Yacht Race

== Births ==
- 3 January – Kerry Armstrong, actress
- 5 January – Penny Whetton, climatologist (died 2019)
- 6 February – Simon Baker, race walker
- 10 February – Phil Weightman, politician
- 12 February – Grant McLennan, singer-songwriter and guitarist (died 2006)
- 14 February – Grant Thomas, Australian rules footballer
- 19 February – Bradley John Murdoch, convicted murder (died 2025)
- 15 February – Steve Bredhauer, politician
- 22 February – Bill Feldman, politician
- 28 February – Neil Bennett, politician
- 1 March – Wayne B. Phillips, cricketer
- 16 March – Phillip Wilcher, pianist and composer
- 20 March – Phil Anderson, cyclist
- 29 March – Geoff Provest, politician
- 11 April – Mark Furner, politician
- 12 April
  - Glenn Patching, swimmer
  - Jim Madden, politician
- 19 April – Bill Byrne, politician
- 5 May – Robert DiPierdomenico, footballer and media personality
- 7 May – Alan John, composer
- 11 May – Peter Antonie, rower
- 11 May – Phil Smyth, basketball player
- 3 July – Gary Buckenara, Australian Rules footballer
- 6 July – Gary Humphries, politician
- 13 July – Richard Glover, journalist, author and radio personality
- 15 July – Phil Gould, rugby league identity
- 12 August – Grace Grace, politician
- 22 August – Jo-Ann Miller, politician
- 30 September – Rod Welford, politician
- October - Garry Pankhurst, former child actor
- 13 October – Jim Krakouer, Australian Rules footballer
- 22 October – Jan Jarratt, politician
- 3 November – Ted Radke, politician
- 15 November – Lewis Fitz-Gerald, actor and director
- 24 November – Alex Douglas, politician
- 26 November – Terry Rogers, politician
- 27 November – Linda Lavarch, politician
- 12 December – Monica Attard, journalist
- 31 December – Geoff Marsh, cricketer

== Deaths ==
- 24 January – William Roy Hodgson, public servant (b. 1892)
- 8 March – Brian Swift, Australian cricketer, died in car accident in the United Kingdom (b. 1937)
- 8 April – Ethel Turner, writer (b. 1872)
- 15 May – Sir John Northmore, Western Australian Supreme Court Chief Justice (b. 1865)
- 4 August – Ethel Anderson, poet, author, and painter (b. 1883)
- 13 September – Russell Mockridge (b. 1928), cyclist
- 14 October – Douglas Mawson, polar explorer (b. 1882)
- 30 November – Hubert Wilkins, polar explorer (b. 1888) (died in the United States)

== See also ==
- List of Australian films of the 1950s
