= 1965 in Australia =

- Monarch: Elizabeth II
- Governor-General: Viscount De L'Isle, then Lord Casey
- Prime minister: Sir Robert Menzies
- Population: 11,387,665
- Australian of the Year: Robert Helpmann
- Elections: WA, SA, NSW

The following lists events that happened during 1965 in Australia.

- Decades: 1940s; 1950s; 1960s; 1970s; 1980s
- See also: 1965 in Australian literature; Other events of 1965; Timeline of Australian history

== Incumbents ==
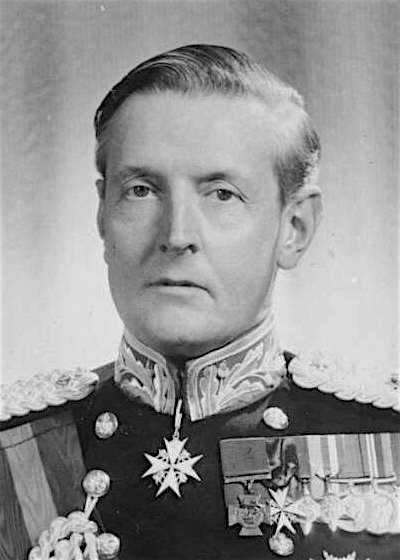
Viscount De L'Isle

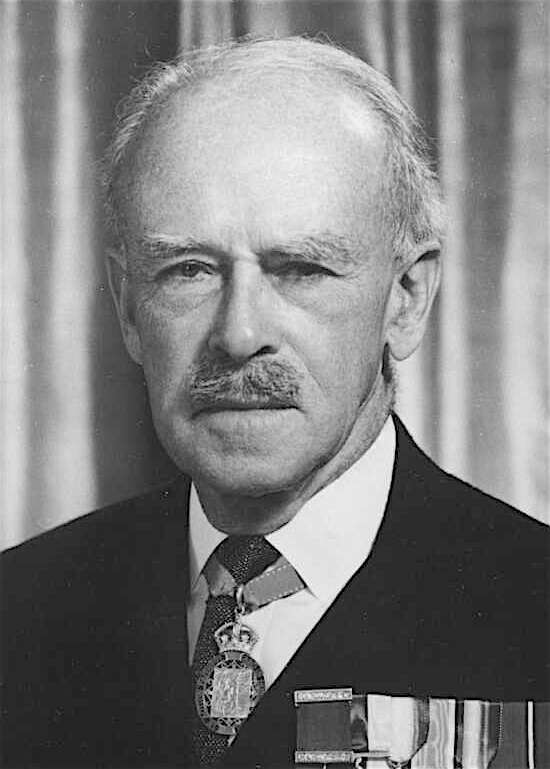
Lord Casey

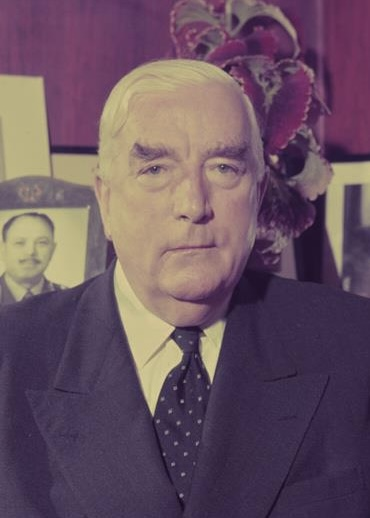
Sir Robert Menzies

- Monarch – Elizabeth II
- Governor-General – Viscount De L'Isle (until 7 May), then Lord Casey
- Prime Minister – Sir Robert Menzies
  - Opposition Leader – Arthur Calwell
- Chief Justice – Sir Garfield Barwick

=== State and territory leaders ===
- Premier of New South Wales – Jack Renshaw (until 13 May), then Robert Askin
  - Opposition Leader – Robert Askin (until 13 May), then Jack Renshaw
- Premier of Queensland – Frank Nicklin
  - Opposition Leader – Jack Duggan
- Premier of South Australia – Sir Thomas Playford IV (until 10 March), then Frank Walsh
  - Opposition Leader – Frank Walsh (until 10 March), then Sir Thomas Playford IV
- Premier of Tasmania – Eric Reece
  - Opposition Leader – Angus Bethune
- Premier of Victoria – Henry Bolte
  - Opposition Leader – Clive Stoneham
- Premier of Western Australia – David Brand
  - Opposition Leader – Albert Hawke

=== Governors and administrators ===
- Governor of New South Wales – Lieutenant General Sir Eric Woodward (until 31 July)
- Governor of Queensland – Colonel Sir Henry Abel Smith
- Governor of South Australia – Lieutenant General Sir Edric Bastyan
- Governor of Tasmania – General Sir Charles Gairdner
- Governor of Victoria – Major General Sir Rohan Delacombe
- Governor of Western Australia – Major General Sir Douglas Kendrew
- Administrator of Nauru – Reginald Leydin
- Administrator of Norfolk Island – Roger Nott
- Administrator of the Northern Territory – Roger Dean
- Administrator of Papua and New Guinea – Sir Donald Cleland

== Events ==
=== January ===
- The Kinks and The Rolling Stones tour Australia
- 7 January – The first hydrofoil service begins on Sydney Harbour.
- 10 January – Evonne Goolagong wins the NSW junior hard-court title.
- 11 January – The bodies of two 15-year-old girls, Christine Sharrock and Marianne Schmidt, are found at Wanda Beach in southern Sydney. Despite the offer of an unprecedented £10,000 reward, the murders are never solved.
- 16 January – The vehicular ferry Empress of Australia begins operating between Sydney and Hobart.
- 27 January – Queensland Police are given the power to arrest without warrant and ban anyone aiding the striking Mount Isa Mines workers. Union leader Pat Mackie is banned from the site.

=== February ===
- Judge Aaron Levine overturns the obscenity conviction of the editors of Oz magazine
- Charles Perkins leads The Freedom Ride, which travels through country NSW, protesting the racial discrimination against Aboriginal people.
- Margaret Court wins the Australian women's tennis singles title for the sixth consecutive year
- 11 February – Mt Isa Mines suspends all operations.
- 18 February – Esso-BHP strikes gas at the Barracouta well in Bass Strait.
- 20 February – Freedom Ride participants including Charles Perkins are ejected from the Moree municipal swimming baths after protesting against its policy of not admitting Aborigines.
- 20 to 26 February – Prince Philip, Duke of Edinburgh tours Australia.
- 22 February – Prince Philip opens the Royal Australian Mint in Canberra.
- Talbot Duckmanton succeeds Sir Charles Moses as chairman of The Australian Broadcasting Commission (ABC)
- The Seekers' single "I'll Never Find Another You" reaches No. 1 in the UK charts. It becomes the first recording by an Australian act to sell more than 1 million copies and eventually sells more than 1.75 million

=== March ===
- 1 March – The Amateur Swimming Union of Australia stuns the nation with its decision that Olympic champion and 1964 Australian of the Year Dawn Fraser will be banned from all amateur competition for ten years. The decision follows an inquiry into Fraser's alleged misbehaviour during the 1964 Summer Olympics in Tokyo.
- 1 March – Echuca, Victoria is gazetted as a city.
- 6 March – The Australian Labor Party wins the South Australian election, taking government for the first time in 32 years. Labor leader Frank Walsh becomes Premier, replacing LCL leader Sir Thomas Playford, Australia's longest-serving premier, who had held office for 26 years, 4 months.
- 10 March – The first drawing of the national service conscription lottery.
- 12 March – Swan Hill, Victoria is gazetted as a city.
- 17 March – The Queensland government legislates to ban picketing and restricting pamphlets and banners at the Mount Isa mine. The strikers workers return to work later in the month.
- 20 March to 26 April – The Duke and Duchess of Gloucester visit Australia.
- 24 March – Prime Minister Menzies announces a new concept in tertiary education as recommended by the Martin Committee on the Future of Tertiary Education in Australia.
- 31 March – Merle Thorton and Rosalie Bogner chained their ankles to the front bar of the Regatta Hotel in Brisbane in protest against the Queensland liquor laws that banned women from pubs.
- George Johnston wins the Miles Franklin Award for his novel My Brother Jack

=== April ===
- 27 April – Police raid Melbourne's Austral Bookshop and seize copies of The Trial of Lady Chatterley, a banned book which recounts of the British obscenity trial of author D. H. Lawrence.
- 29 April – Prime Minister Robert Menzies announces that an Australian combat force will be sent to South Vietnam in response to a request for military aid from the South Vietnamese government.

=== May ===
- 1 May – The Australian Labor Party (ALP) is defeated in the NSW state election after 24 years in government and the Liberal Party, led by Robin Askin takes power.
- 7 May – Richard Casey, Baron Casey succeeds William Sidney, 1st Viscount De L'Isle as Governor-General of Australia.
- 27 May – The 1st Battalion, Royal Australian Regiment leaves for Vietnam on HMAS Sydney.
- 29 May – The official opening of the Captain Cook Bridge, which spans the Georges River

=== June ===
- TV variety show In Melbourne Tonight celebrates its 2000th performance. Since its premiere in 1957 the show had earned the Nine Network over £AU4 million in advertising revenue and it attracted more viewers per capita than any other television show in the world, with the network rumoured to be paying host Graham Kennedy more than £AU20,000 per year (14 June)
- 21 June – The Premier of Tasmania, Eric Reece, announces the Gordon Power scheme will "result in some modification to the Lake Pedder National Park", but it was still in development and no further details were revealed.
- 30 June – At a speech to the Australian Club in London, PM Sir Robert Menzies declares that Australia is in a state of war in Vietnam.

=== July ===
- 2 July – Secondary school teachers in Victoria stage a strike, the first teachers' strike in Australia since 1920.
- 18 to 20 July - Snow is recorded as far north as the Clark Range in Queensland, killing drought-weakened livestock. At the same time, extremely heavy rainfall in the North Coast turns drought into flood, with Brisbane having its wettest-ever July day with 193.2 millimetres (7.6 in).

=== August ===
- 13 August – A limited free-trade agreement is negotiated between Australia and New Zealand.
- 21 August – A report of the Vernon Committee of Economic Inquiry is tabled in federal parliament; the principal recommendations are rejected by government.

=== September ===
- 23 September – Roma Mitchell is appointed a judge of the Supreme Court of South Australia, the first woman to become a judge in Australia.

=== October ===
- 7 October – Sir Robert Menzies appointed Lord Warden of the Cinque Ports.
- 30 October – English model Jean Shrimpton wears a controversially short white shift dress to the Victoria Derby at Flemington Racecourse in Melbourne, Australia – a pivotal moment of the introduction of the miniskirt to women's fashion.

=== November ===
- Churchill Fellowships are awarded for the first time.
- 5 November – The 1st Battalion, Royal Australian Regiment, is deployed in Operation Hump in Vietnam.
- 7 November – An underground fire occurs at the Bulli Colliery in New South Wales; four miners are killed.
- 13 November – Kevin Arthur Wheatley dies in Vietnam while defending a wounded comrade. He was awarded the Victoria Cross for his gallantry.
- 16 November – Australia imposed economic sanctions on Rhodesia following that country's unilateral declaration of independence.

=== December ===
- The first section of the Sydney-Newcastle Freeway is opened.
- 15 December – Harry Chan becomes the first elected president of the NT Legislative Council.

=== Date unknown ===
- the Australian Conservation Foundation is formed
- the Australian Council of National Trusts (ACNT) is formed
- Northern Territory patrol officers forcibly round up the last groups of the Pintubi Aboriginal people still living an independent traditional lifestyle, and resettle them on the Papunya and Yuendumu missions
- the White Australia Policy was removed from the Australian Labor Party platform at their national conference. This came after past attempts in 1959 and 1961 failed.

== Science and technology ==
- The Siding Spring Observatory opens

== Arts and literature ==
- Clifton Pugh's portrait of R.A. Henderson wins the Archibald Prize for portraiture
- Larry Sitsky's opera The Fall of the House of Usher
- Peter Sculthorpe's Sun Music I
- Joan Sutherland returns to perform in Australia after 14 years overseas
- the Canberra School of Music is established
- Ballet in a Nutshell (later the Sydney Dance Company) and the Australian Dance Theatre form
- The South Australian Theatre Company is formed
- Sydney's Philip St Theatre stages its famous comedy revue A Cup of Tea, a Bex and a Good Lie Down. The production runs for twelve months, and the title passes into common usage.
- The Ambassador (Morris West)
- The Merry-Go-Round in the Sea (Randolph Stow)
- The Slow Natives by Thea Astley is awarded the Miles Franklin Literary Award

== Film ==
- Faces in the Sun wins the AFI Award for Best Film

== Television ==
- Jimmy Hannan wins the Gold Logie Award

== Sport ==
Light Fingers won the Melbourne Cup.

Cricket: Australia lose a five test series away to the West Indies 2–1. The West Indies side includes greats such as Garry Sobers and Rohan Kanhai, while Australia featured opening batsmen Bill Lawry and Bobby Simpson.

Cricinfo series page

Rugby league: 1965 NSWRFL season St. George win the tenth of a record eleven consecutive premierships in the NSWRL, defeating South Sydney 12–8 in the Grand Final. Eastern Suburbs finish in last position, claiming the wooden spoon.

Golf: The Australian Veteran Golfers Association. (A.V.G.A.) was formed on 7 July 1965 by four businessmen, Messrs. A Hall, W.Foulsham J.Barkel and H.Hattersley.

== Births ==
- 25 January – Luke Woolmer, politician
- 17 March – Tarnya Smith, politician
- 6 April – Tim Nicholls, politician
- 18 April – Fiona Simpson, politician
- 24 April – Lucinda Cowden, actress
- 10 May
  - Greg Fasala, swimmer
  - Paul Langmack, rugby league player and coach
- 13 May – John McVeigh, politician
- 15 May – Glenn Seton, racing driver
- 23 May – Paul Sironen, rugby league player
- 31 May – Todd McKenney, entertainer
- 2 June – Steve Waugh, Mark Waugh, cricketers
- 4 June – Michael Doohan, motorcycle racer
- 25 June – Stan Longinidis, heavyweight kickboxer
- 1 July – Simon Youl, tennis player
- 7 July – Irina Berezina, Ukrainian-born international chess Master and trainer
- 9 July – Steve Minnikin, politician
- 12 July – Jennifer Howard, politician
- 25 July – Dale Shearer, rugby league footballer
- 2 August
  - Andrew Blackman, actor and theatre director
  - Joe Hockey, politician
- 9 August – Darren Millane, Australian rules football player (d. 1991)
- 28 August – Steve Walters, rugby league footballer of the 1980s and 1990s.
- 1 September – Craig McLachlan, actor and singer
- 19 September – Antonella Gambotto-Burke, author and journalist
- 21 September – David Wenham, actor
- 26 October – Steve Davies, politician
- 29 October – Andrew Ettingshausen, rugby league footballer of the 1980s and 1990s
- 1 November – Michael Daley, politician
- 5 December – Simon Finn, politician
- 7 December – Deborah Bassett, rower
- 11 December – Glenn Lazarus, rugby league footballer of the 1980s and 1990s.

== Deaths ==
- 20 February – Lex Davison, racing driver (born 1923)
- 7 May – Joe Abbott, politician (born 1891)
- 15 June – Florence Sulman, author and educationalist (born 1876 in England)
- 2 November – H. V. Evatt, politician and diplomat (born 1894)

== See also ==
- List of Australian films of the 1960s
