= 1961 in Australia =

- Monarch: Elizabeth II
- Governor-General: William Morrison, then William Sidney
- Prime minister: Robert Menzies
- Population: 10,548,267
- Australian of the Year: Joan Sutherland
- Elections: Federal, VIC

The following lists events that happened during 1961 in Australia.

- Decades: 1940s; 1950s; 1960s; 1970s; 1980s
- See also: 1961 in Australian literature; Other events of 1961; Federal election; Timeline of Australian history

== Incumbents ==
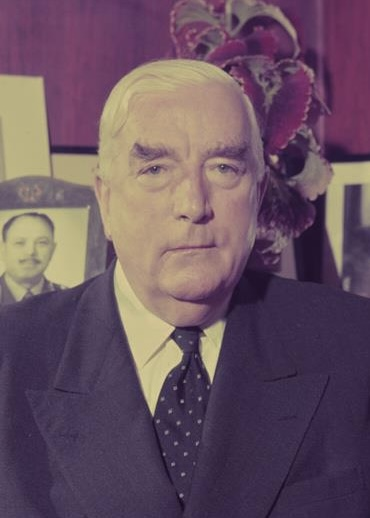
Robert Menzies

- Monarch – Elizabeth II
- Prime Minister – Robert Menzies
- Governor General – William Morrison, 1st Viscount Dunrossil (died in office 3 February), then William Sidney, 1st Viscount De L'Isle
- Chief Justice – Sir Owen Dixon

=== State Premiers ===
- Premier of New South Wales – Robert Heffron
- Premier of Queensland – Frank Nicklin
- Premier of South Australia – Sir Thomas Playford
- Premier of Tasmania – Eric Reece
- Premier of Western Australia – David Brand
- Premier of Victoria – Henry Bolte

=== State Governors ===
- Governor of New South Wales – Sir Eric Woodward
- Governor of Queensland – Sir Henry Abel Smith
- Governor of South Australia – Sir Edric Bastyan (from 4 April)
- Governor of Tasmania – Thomas Corbett, 2nd Baron Rowallan
- Governor of Western Australia – Sir Charles Gairdner
- Governor of Victoria – Sir Dallas Brooks

== Events ==
- 2 January – Oral contraceptives are first sold in Australia
- 20 January to early March – Disastrous bushfires affect Western Australia, completely destroying a number of towns.
- 25 February – Last electric tram service runs in Sydney
- 23 June – Australia signed the Antarctic Treaty
- 12 August – Richmond become the only team since 1922 to fail to score a goal in a VFL/AFL match.
- 31 October – Parkes radiotelescope officially opened by the Governor General
- 30 November – Ansett-ANA Flight 325, a Vickers Viscount aircraft, crashes into Botany Bay shortly after takeoff, killing all 15 on board

== Arts and literature ==
- Dame Joan Sutherland is announced as Australian of the Year
- William Edwin Pidgeon wins the Archibald Prize
- The novel Lady Chatterley's Lover by D. H. Lawrence is banned from sale
- Riders in the Chariot by Patrick White is awarded the Miles Franklin Literary Award

== Television ==
- 19 August – Four Corners TV current affairs program first screened on ABC TV
- 1 December - The first regional television station is launched in Traralgon, Victoria, as GLV-10 Gippsland and Latrobe Valley (Television) Victoria.

== Sport ==
- Cricket
  - New South Wales wins the Sheffield Shield
  - The Ashes: Australia defeats England 2-1 and retains The Ashes
- Football
  - Brisbane Rugby League premiership: Norths defeated Valleys 29-5
  - New South Wales Rugby League premiership: St. George defeated Western Suburbs 22-0
  - South Australian National Football League premiership: won by West Adelaide
  - Victorian Football League premiership: Hawthorn defeated Footscray 94-51
- Golf
  - Australian Open: won by Frank Phillips
  - Australian PGA Championship: won by Alan Murray (golfer)
- Horse racing
  - Summer Fair wins the Caulfield Cup
  - Dhaulagiri wins the Cox Plate
  - Magic Night wins the Golden Slipper
  - Lord Fury wins the Melbourne Cup
- Motor racing
  - The Australian Grand Prix was held at Mallala and won by Lex Davison driving a Cooper Climax
- Tennis
  - Australian Open men's singles: Roy Emerson defeats Rod Laver 1–6, 6–3, 7–5, 6–4
  - Australian Open women's singles: Margaret Court defeats Jan Lehane O'Neill 6–1, 6–4
  - Davis Cup: Australia defeats Italy 5–0 in the 1961 Davis Cup final
  - Wimbledon: Roy Emerson and Neale Fraser win the Men's Doubles
  - Wimbledon: Rod Laver wins the Men's Singles
- Yachting
  - Astor takes line honours and Rival wins on handicap in the Sydney to Hobart Yacht Race

== Births ==
- 1 January – Sam Backo, Indigenous Australian rugby league footballer
- 7 January – Andrew Thomson, lawyer and politician
- 9 February – Alison Megarrity, politician (died 2022)
- 12 February – Di Farmer, politician
- 15 February – Neale Daniher, Australian rules footballer (died 2026)
- 26 February – Trevor Strong, politician
- 28 February – Mark Latham, politician
- 2 March – Simone Young, conductor
- 4 March – Bart Bassett, politician
- 14 March – Garry Jack, rugby league footballer and coach
- 16 March – Brett Kenny, rugby league footballer
- 24 March – Dean Jones, cricketer, coach and commentator (died 2020)
- 26 March – Richard Torbay, politician
- 29 March – Gary Brabham, racing driver
- 12 April
  - Magda Szubanski, actor and comedian
  - Lisa Gerrard, singer
- 20 April – Frances Adamson, Australian public servant and diplomat, Australian Ambassador to China
- 2 May – Peter Doohan, tennis player (died 2017)
- 16 May – Gina Riley, actor and comedian
- 31 May – Justin Madden, Australian rules footballer
- 2 June – Kerry Saxby-Junna, racewalker
- 6 July - Rick Price, singer
- 18 July – Stephen Hodge, cyclist
- 21 July – Morris Iemma, 40th Premier of New South Wales
- 1 August – Peter Evans, swimmer
- 8 August – Tim Mander, politician and rugby league referee
- 12 August – Peter Dowling, politician
- 19 August – Frank Terenzini, politician
- 20 August – Greg Egan, science fiction author and mathematician
- 3 September – Andy Griffiths, author
- 15 September
  - Terry Lamb, rugby league footballer and coach
  - Joan Pease, politician
- 29 September – Julia Gillard, Welsh-Australian lawyer and politician, Prime Minister of Australia
- 8 October – Simon Burke, actor
- 19 October – Cliff Lyons, rugby league footballer
- 23 October – Brett Dean, composer, conductor and violist
- 18 November – Anthony Warlow, entertainer
- 23 November – Merv Hughes, cricketer
- 4 December – Sonia Hornery, politician
- 17 December – Larry Anthony, politician
- 29 December – Mal Brough, politician

== Deaths ==
- 3 January – Auvergne Doherty, businesswoman (born 1896)
- 3 February – William Morrison (born 1893), Governor General of Australia
- 20 February – Percy Grainger (born 1882), pianist and composer
- 22 May – Lionel Lindsay (born 1874), artist
- 27 September – Peter Dawson (born 1882), singer
- 2 October – Essington Lewis (born 1881), industrialist
- 3 December – Pat O'Hara Wood (born 1891), tennis player
- 20 December – Earle Page (born 1880), Prime Minister of Australia
- 29 December – Sibyl Morrison (born 1895), first female barrister in New South Wales

== See also ==
- List of Australian films of the 1960s
