= 1962 in Australia =

- Monarch: Elizabeth II
- Governor-General: William Sidney
- Prime minister: Robert Menzies
- Population: 10,742,291
- Australian of the Year: Jock Sturrock
- Elections: SA, NSW, WA

The following lists events that happened during 1962 in Australia.

- Decades: 1940s; 1950s; 1960s; 1970s; 1980s
- See also: 1962 in Australian literature; Other events of 1962; Timeline of Australian history

== Incumbents ==
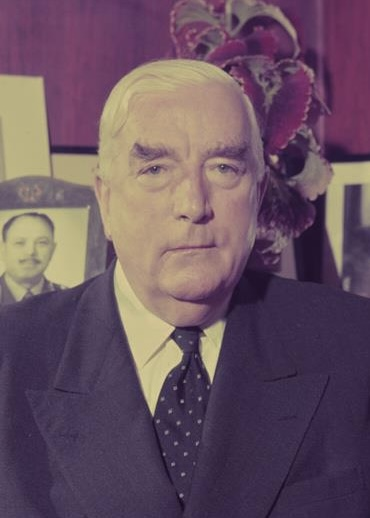
Robert Menzies

- Monarch – Elizabeth II
- Prime Minister – Robert Menzies
- Governor General – William Sidney, 1st Viscount De L'Isle
- Chief Justice – Sir Owen Dixon

=== State Premiers ===
- Premier of New South Wales – Robert Heffron
- Premier of Queensland – Frank Nicklin
- Premier of South Australia – Sir Thomas Playford
- Premier of Tasmania – Eric Reece
- Premier of Western Australia – David Brand
- Premier of Victoria – Henry Bolte

=== State Governors ===
- Governor of New South Wales – Sir Eric Woodward
- Governor of Queensland – Sir Henry Abel Smith
- Governor of South Australia – Sir Edric Bastyan
- Governor of Tasmania – Thomas Corbett, 2nd Baron Rowallan
- Governor of Western Australia – Sir Charles Gairdner
- Governor of Victoria – Sir Dallas Brooksis

== Events ==
- The Australian Ballet is founded.
- 1 March – The final section of the Cahill Expressway opens in Sydney.

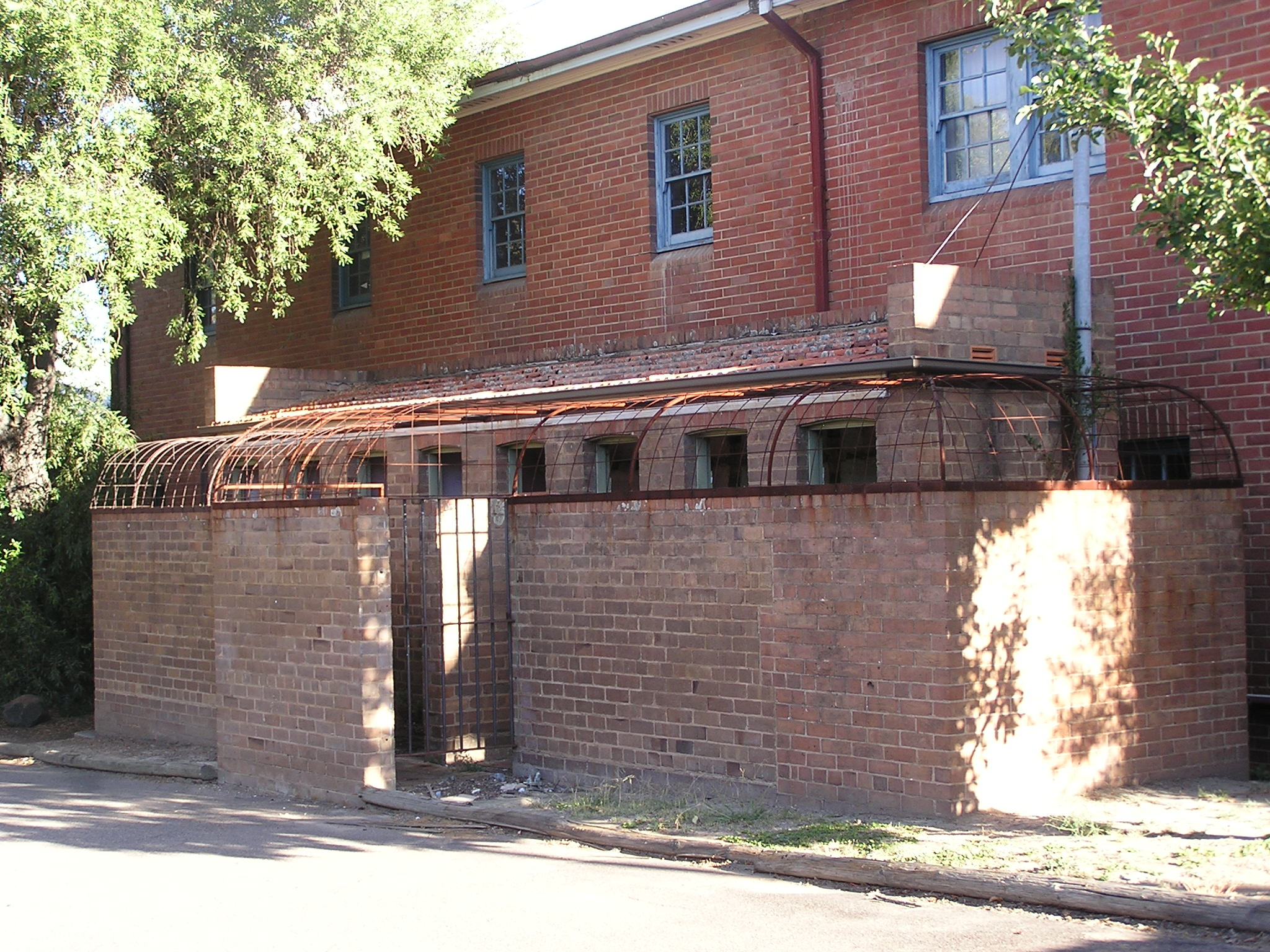
The toilets of St Brigid's; the reason for the 1962 School Strike and the beginning of State Aid to non-Government schools

- 16 July – The Goulburn School Strike started. This was an education strike in Goulburn, New South Wales, where, in response to a demand for the installation of three extra toilets at a local Catholic Primary School, the local community closed down these schools and sent the children to the Government schools. The Catholic Church declared they had no money to install the extra toilets. Nearly 1,000 children turned up to be enrolled locally and the state schools were unable to accommodate them. In 1963, Menzies made State aid for science blocks part of his party's platform in response to the public debate engendered by the Goulburn strike.
- 15 August – The Red Sales aerobatic team, flying Vampire jets, crashes in practice, killing six people.
- 28 September – Paddington tram depot fire: One fifth of the Brisbane tram fleet is destroyed when the Paddington tram depot is burnt down in suspicious circumstances. 65 trams are destroyed.

== Arts and literature ==
- 2 November – The first performance of the Australian Ballet Company in Sydney was of Swan Lake.
- The Well Dressed Explorer by Thea Astley and The Cupboard Under the Stairs by George Turner are jointly awarded the Miles Franklin Literary Award

== Television ==
- 4 March – NBN Television opens in Newcastle, New South Wales as NBN-3.
- 18 March – WIN Television opens in Wollongong, New South Wales as WIN-4.
- 26 May - Southern Cross Television opens in Launceston, Tasmania as TNT-9

== Sport ==
- General
  - Australia wins 38 gold medals at the 1962 British Empire and Commonwealth Games, held in Perth
- Athletics
  - 11 August – Keith Ollerenshaw wins the men's national marathon title, clocking 2:26:24.2 in Perth.
- Cricket
  - New South Wales wins the Sheffield Shield
- Football
  - Bledisloe Cup: retained by the All Blacks
  - Brisbane Rugby League premiership: Norths defeated Valleys 22–0
  - New South Wales Rugby League premiership: St. George defeated Wests 9–6 ** South Australian National Football League premiership: won by Port Adelaide
  - Victorian Football League premiership: Essendon defeated Carlton 90–58
- Golf
  - Australian Open: won by Gary Player
  - Australian PGA Championship: won by Bill Dunk
- Horse racing
  - Indian Summer wins the AJC Oaks
  - Even Stevens wins the Caulfield Cup
  - Aquanita wins the Cox Plate
  - Birthday Card wins the Golden Slipper
  - Even Stevens wins the Melbourne Cup
- Motor racing
  - The Australian Grand Prix was held at Caversham and won by Bruce McLaren driving a Cooper-Climax
  - The Armstrong 500 was held at Phillip Island, and was won by Harry Firth and Bob Jane driving an XL Falcon
- Squash
  - Heather Blundell wins the Women's Championship at the British Open Squash Championships
- Tennis
  - Australian Open men's singles: Rod Laver defeats Roy Emerson 8–6 0–6 6–4 6-4
  - Australian Open women's singles: Margaret Court defeats Jan Lehane O'Neill 6–0 6-2
  - Davis Cup: Australia defeats Mexico 5–0 in the 1962 Davis Cup final
  - French Open: Rod Laver wins the Men's Singles
  - French Open: Margaret Court wins the Women's Singles
  - French Open: Roy Emerson and Neale Fraser win the Men's Doubles
  - US Open: Rod Laver wins the Men's Singles
  - US Open: Margaret Court wins the Women's Singles
  - Wimbledon: Rod Laver wins the Men's Singles
  - Wimbledon: Bob Hewitt and Fred Stolle win the Men's Doubles
- Yachting
  - Gretel makes Australia's first challenge for the America's Cup, losing 4–1 to the American opponent Weatherly
  - Ondine takes line honours and Solo wins on handicap in the Sydney to Hobart Yacht Race

== Births ==
- 23 January – Richard Roxburgh, actor, writer, producer and director
- 28 January – Barbara Stone, politician
- 14 February – Stephen Robertson, politician
- 17 February – David McComb, musician (d. 1999)
- 22 February – Steve Irwin, wildlife expert and media personality (died 2006)
- 9 March – Jeff Knuth, politician
- 13 April – Andrew Jachno, race walker
- 24 April – Steve "Blocker" Roach, rugby league footballer of the 1980s and 1990s
- 26 April – Trevor Marmalade, comedian and author
- 6 May – Julieanne Gilbert, politician
- 13 May – Paul McDermott, comedian and singer
- 25 May – Ros Bates, politician
- 28 May – Gary Belcher, rugby league player and commentator
- 24 June – Steve Dickson, politician
- 3 July - Brian Canham, musician and singer Pseudo Echo
- 9 July – Paul Lucas, politician
- 15 July – Michelle Ford, swimmer
- 18 July – Shaun Micallef, comedian
- 31 July – Damien Frawley, rugby union player
- 6 August – Steven Lee, alpine skier
- 15 September – Scott McNeil, voice actor
- 17 September – Baz Luhrmann, film director and producer
- 26 September – Steve Moneghetti, long-distance runner
- 13 October – David Dalgleish, politician
- 26 October – Rob Messenger, politician
- 30 October – Colin Boyce, politician
- 10 November – Bob Lindner, rugby league footballer and coach
- 11 November – James Morrison, jazz musician
- 5 December – Michael Harvey, racewalker
- 8 December
  - Steve Elkington, golfer
  - Tracy Davis, politician
- 12 December – Chris Cummins, politician
- 16 December – John English, politician

== Deaths ==
- 17 January – Frank Hurley, film maker and photographer (b. 1885)
- 29 July – Sir Ronald Fisher, statistician (b. 1890)
- 3 December – Dame Mary Gilmore, socialist poet and journalist (b. 1865)

== See also ==
- List of Australian films of the 1960s
