= 1966 in Australia =

- Monarch: Elizabeth II
- Governor-General: Lord Casey
- Prime minister: Sir Robert Menzies, then Harold Holt
- Population: 11,599,498
- Australian of the Year: Jack Brabham
- Elections: QLD, Federal

The following lists events that happened during 1966 in Australia.

- Decades: 1940s; 1950s; 1960s; 1970s; 1980s
- See also: 1966 in Australian literature; Other events of 1966; Federal election; Timeline of Australian history

== Incumbents ==
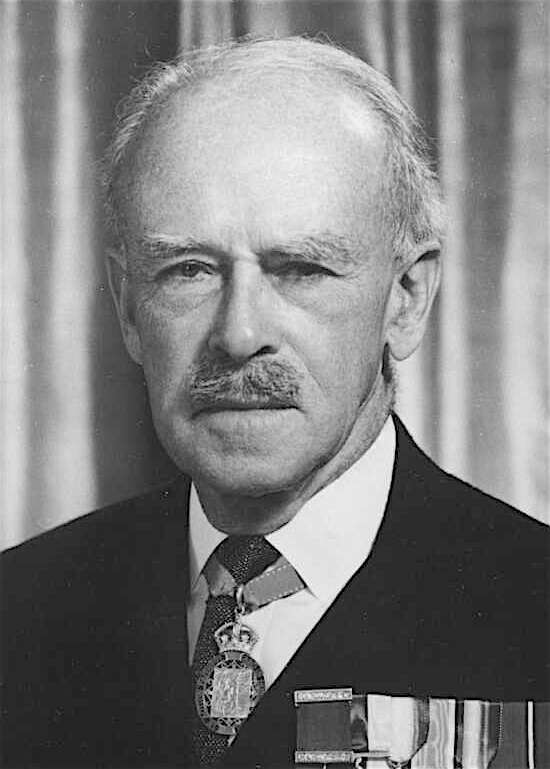
Lord Casey

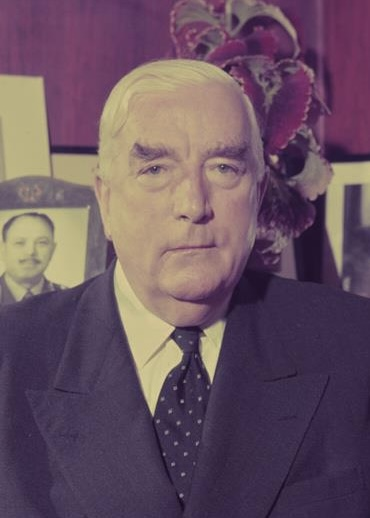
Sir Robert Menzies

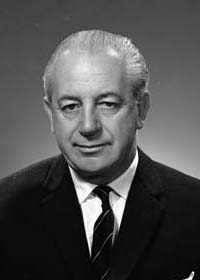
Harold Holt

- Monarch – Elizabeth II
- Governor-General – Lord Casey
- Prime Minister – Sir Robert Menzies (until 26 January), then Harold Holt
  - Opposition Leader – Arthur Calwell
- Chief Justice – Sir Garfield Barwick

=== State and territory leaders ===
- Premier of New South Wales – Robert Askin
  - Opposition Leader – Jack Renshaw
- Premier of Queensland – Frank Nicklin
  - Opposition Leader – Jack Duggan (until 11 October), then Jack Houston
- Premier of South Australia – Frank Walsh
  - Opposition Leader – Sir Thomas Playford IV (until 13 July), then Steele Hall
- Premier of Tasmania – Eric Reece
  - Opposition Leader – Angus Bethune
- Premier of Victoria – (Sir) Henry Bolte
  - Opposition Leader – Clive Stoneham
- Premier of Western Australia – David Brand
  - Opposition Leader – Albert Hawke (until 31 December), then John Tonkin

=== Governors and administrators ===
- Governor of New South Wales – Sir Roden Cutler (from 20 January)
- Governor of Queensland – Colonel Sir Henry Abel Smith (until 18 March), then Sir Alan Mansfield (from 21 March)
- Governor of South Australia – Lieutenant General Sir Edric Bastyan
- Governor of Tasmania – General Sir Charles Gairdner
- Governor of Victoria – Major General Sir Rohan Delacombe
- Governor of Western Australia – Major General Sir Douglas Kendrew
- Administrator of Nauru – Reginald Leydin (until February), then Leslie King (from 3 May)
- Administrator of Norfolk Island – Roger Nott, then Reginald Marsh
- Administrator of the Northern Territory – Roger Dean
- Administrator of Papua and New Guinea – Sir Donald Cleland (until December)

== Events ==
=== January ===
- 14 January – Ballet dancer and choreographer Robert Helpmann is named as 1965's Australian of the Year.
- 20 January – Robert Menzies, Australia's longest-serving Prime Minister, retires and is succeeded by Harold Holt.
- 26 January – The Beaumont children are abducted during a visit to Glenelg beach in Adelaide and are never seen again.
- 28 January – Western Mining Corporation discover rich nickel ore deposits at Kambalda in Western Australia's Goldfields region.
- 29 January – Wilhelmina Kruger, a 57-year-old cleaner is murdered as she worked her early morning shift at Wollongong's Piccadilly Arcade shopping centre. Despite Christopher Wilder being a suspect, her murder remains unsolved.
- 30 January – The Prince of Wales arrives in Australia to attend Geelong Grammar School's exclusive Timbertop preparatory school.

=== February ===
- 1 February – Victoria's State Executive Council commutes the death sentence which had been handed to 32-year-old triple murderer John Desmond David who pled guilty in November 1965 to three murders. Instead of being hanged, David's sentence is commuted to 40 years imprisonment making him the fourth convicted murderer whose death sentence is commuted since Robert Peters Tait in 1962.
- 4 February – Two men, aged 19 and 22, undergoing a 10-week basic training course at the Army Recruit Training Centre at Kapooka survive a lightning strike.
- 5 February – While playing in the sand on a beach at Windang near Wollongong, a 12-year-old boy discovers the body of 29-year-old Giorgina Radoicovich. A Supreme Court jury later finds her 31-year-old husband Vittorio Radoicovich not guilty of murder, but guilty of manslaughter and is sentenced to 10 years imprisonment.
- 14 February – Decimalisation of the Australian currency; the Australian dollar replaces the Australian pound at the rate of ten shillings to the dollar.
- 18 February – US Vice-president Hubert Humphrey arrives in Australia to assure the Australian government that the war is being directed by Hanoi and Peking, and that it represents one of China's numerous offensives in Asia.
- 28 February –
  - Jørn Utzon resigns as architect of the Sydney Opera House, following a bitter struggle with the new Public Works Minister Davis Hughes over fees, costs and design changes.
  - Victoria extends hotel trading hours from 6pm to 10pm, ending the infamous "Six O'Clock Swill". Driving with a blood alcohol level over 0.05% becomes a criminal offence.

=== March ===
- 10 March – On advice from Immigration Minister Hubert Opperman, federal cabinet reverses a decision of September 1964, agreeing that non-Europeans could be selected on an individual basis to enter as immigrants with permanent resident status and naturalisation on an equal basis with European applicants.
- 16 March – Widespread rain in New South Wales brings a slight reprieve for some areas affected by Australia's severe drought which has stricken large areas of the country since 1957, particularly in New South Wales and Queensland.
- 30 March – Ronald Joseph Ryan is found guilty of murdering warder George Henry Hodson at HM Prison Pentridge on 19 December 1965 and is sentenced to death. Peter John Walker is found guilty of manslaughter and is sentenced to 12 years imprisonment.

=== April ===
- 7 April – New South Wales repeals the Sunday Observance Act, allowing theatres and cinemas to open, sporting events to charge admission and clubs to sell alcohol on Sundays.
- 19 April – The first National Service conscripts fly out from RAAF Base Richmond base in Sydney bound for the Vietnam War.

=== May ===
- 12 May – 21-year-old pilot Mary Fergusson on her final test flight to qualify for her full pilot's licence goes missing in Tasmania en route from Cambridge to Flinders Island prompting a widespread search. Her body and her crashed Cessna are discovered several days later, only 50 miles from the Cambridge Aerodrome where she took off.

=== June ===
- 8 June – Ronald Joseph Ryan and Peter John Walker lose their appeals against their sentences relating to the murder of Pentridge warder George Henry Hodson on 19 December 1965. After being convicted of Hodson's murder in March, Ryan was sentenced to death while Walker is convicted of manslaughter and sentenced to 12 years imprisonment.
- 21 June – Federal ALP leader Arthur Calwell is injured in an assassination attempt by 19-year-old Peter Kocan.

=== July ===
- 5 July – The Australian Workers' Union affiliates with the Australian Council of Trade Unions.
- 9 July – The Arbitration Commission introduces a minimum weekly wage for adult male employees under federal awards.
- 20 July – Former Australian prime minister Sir Robert Menzies is installed as the 159th Lord Warden of the Cinque Ports at Dover Castle.
- 21 July – Marcus Loane becomes the first Australian-born Anglican Archbishop of Sydney when he is elected in a 162-vote majority during a secret preferential ballot held after midnight.

=== August ===
- 10 August – 41-year-old Helen Byrie Bernadette Jeffrey is found guilty of murdering her de facto husband 39-year-old Colin Howard Jeffrey in Healesville, Victoria on 27 March 1964, and is sentenced to death. Her death sentence is later commuted to 10 years imprisonment on 23 May 1967.
- 18 August – Australian forces engage in their first major battle in Vietnam at the Battle of Long Tan, inflicting heavy losses on NLF troops.
- 23 August – Two hundred Gurindji people walk off Wave Hill Station in the Northern Territory in protest at low wages and poor conditions.

=== September ===
- 1 September – Holden becomes the first local car manufacturer to install seat belts as standard equipment in all its new vehicles, starting with the Holden HR.
- 17 September – 18-year-old David Michael Ewer is found guilty of murdering 51-year-old Kathleen McLean in the Melbourne suburb of Albert Park on 22 April 1966, and is sentenced to death. His death sentence is later commuted to 30 years imprisonment on 15 March 1967.
- 22 September – Ansett-ANA Flight 149 crashes near Winton, Queensland, killing all 24 people on board.
- 24 September – Six people, including a 12-year-old boy, are killed when a Lockheed Hudson aircraft owned by Adastra Aerial Surveys crashes near the Tennant Creek Airport.

=== October ===
- 13 October – 25-year-old Keith Ryrie is found guilty of the murder of 5-year-old Rhonda Margaret Irwin in Melbourne on 17 April 1966, and is sentenced to death. His death sentence is later commuted to 50 years imprisonment on 29 May 1967.
- 20 October – US President Lyndon Johnson arrives for a 3-day visit of Australian east coast cities, sparking rowdy demonstrations by anti-war protesters.
- 26 October – 20-year-old Anthony Lynes Burton is found guilty of murdering his parents 49-year-old Joyce Carol Burton and 51-year-old Colin Richard Burton in the Melbourne suburb of Huntingdale on 13 April 1966, and is sentenced to death. His death sentence is later commuted to 30 years imprisonment on 15 March 1967.

=== November ===
- 3 November – The Liberal Reform Group (which later evolves into the Australian Party) is founded.
- 22 November – Conscientious objector William White is forcibly taken from his home in Sydney and inducted into the army.
- 26 November – The Liberal government of Harold Holt scores a massive victory in the 1966 federal election, and is returned to power with the largest majority in the federal parliament's 65-year history.

=== December ===
- 9 December – Australia negotiates an agreement for an American spy satellite base to be established at Pine Gap in the Northern Territory, with federal minister for external affairs Paul Hasluck signing a treaty with the United States chargé d'affaires.
- 12 December – Victoria's State Executive Council schedules Ronald Ryan's hanging for 9 January 1967.
- 22 December – The Federal government announces the formation of a military Task Force (including conscripts), increasing Australia's commitment to the Vietnam War to 4,500.

=== Other events ===
- Japan replaces Great Britain as Australia's largest trading partner.
- The council for the Defence of Government Schools (DOGS) is formed in Melbourne.
- The Government of Queensland grants sand mining leases on Fraser Island without holding the required public hearings.

== Science and technology ==
- Sydney industrial designer Harry Widmer wins the prestigious F.H. Edwards Laurel Award for his design for the Kriesler Mini 41–47 portable radio. The 41-47's innovative polypropylene plastic casing is the first use of this material anywhere in the world in consumer electronics.
- 24 November – Australia's first satellite communications earth station opens at Carnarvon, Western Australia.

== Arts and literature ==
- 21 January –
  - Director of the New South Wales Art Gallery Hal Missingham announces Clifton Pugh as the 1965 Archibald Prize winner for his portrait of Rupert Henderson.
  - Sali Herman is announces as the 1965 winner of the Wynne Prize for a painting entitled The Red House.
- 31 January – The Seekers arrive back in Australia for a concert tour which begins in Perth on 2 February. While in Australia, Judith Durham serves as a bridesmaid at her sister's wedding at St Peter's Church in Eastern Hill, while Keith Potger and his wife Pamela have their marriage blessed at St Martin's Anglican Church in Hawksburn on 6 February.
- February – The Solid Mandala by Patrick White is published.
- 2 February – The first edition of the pop magazine Go-Set is published in Melbourne.
- 16 February – The Rolling Stones return to Australia for their second tour, which commences at the Sydney Showground on 18 February.
- 26 March – Sydney's Tivoli Theatre closes.
- 3 April – Melbourne's Tivoli Theatre closes.
- 13 April – Bob Dylan's first concert in Australia is held at Sydney Stadium, marking the start of his first tour of Australia, supported by The Band.
- 17 April – John Cargher's ABC Radio series Singers of Renown begins on Melbourne's 3LO.
- 20 April – Thea Astley is named as the 1965 Miles Franklin Award winner for her novel The Slow Natives.
- 14 May – It's announced that Ku-ring-gai Council has granted Sydney's Community Theatre Company a five-year lease of Killara Memorial Hall which is to be transformed into the Marian Street Theatre, which is ultimately opened on 28 March 1968.
- 10 July – The Easybeats leave for London. Their departure is delayed when they were among the 100 passengers forced to disembark their plane at Sydney Airport when an anonymous caller claimed a bomb was on the aircraft.
- 17 July – The Twilights win the grand final of the inaugural national Hoadley's Battle of the Sounds at Melbourne's Festival Hall. The event is almost overshadowed when six teenage girls are ejected by police after they attempt to climb onto the stage as judge Normie Rowe performed.
- October – The Tyranny of Distance: How Distance Shaped Australia's History by Geoffrey Blainey is published.
- 20 January 1967 –
  - Jon Molvig's portrait of Charles Blackman wins the 1966 Archibald Prize.
  - Fred Williams' Upwey Landscape is awarded the 1966 Wynne Prize.
- 18 April 1967 – Trap by Peter Mathers is awarded the 1966 Miles Franklin Literary Award.

== Film ==
- The Admiral's Cup wins the AFI Best Film award
- Bruce Beresford is appointed secretary of the British Film Institute's Film Production Board

== Television ==
- 21 March – Gordon Chater from Seven's The Mavis Bramston Show wins the Gold Logie at the 1966 Logie Awards.
- 18 July – ABC TV children's program Play School first airs.

== Sport ==
- 21 May – Anthony Cook wins the men's national marathon title, clocking 2:20:44.6 in Ballarat.
- 17 September – St. George win their 11th consecutive NSWRL premiership, defeating Balmain 23–4 in the 1966 NSWRFL Grand Final. This would be St George's final premiership win until 1977. Eastern Suburbs, after not winning a single match, finish in last position, claiming the wooden spoon for the second year in a row.
- 24 September – St Kilda defeats Collingwood in the 1966 VFL Grand Final.
- 1 November – The Bart Cummings-trained Galilee (ridden by John Miller) wins the 1966 Melbourne Cup.
- 30 December – Fidelis takes line honours in the Sydney to Hobart Yacht Race while Cadence is ultimately declared the handicap winner.

== Births ==
- 1 January – Anna Burke, politician
- 10 January – Jeremy Sims, film director
- 4 February – Tony Butterfield, rugby league player
- 22 February – Brian Greig, politician
- 24 February
  - Katie Allen, politician (d. 2025)
  - David Harris, politician
- 9 March
  - Tony Lockett, Australian Rules football player
  - Jonathan O'Dea, politician
- 10 March – Katrina Hodgkinson, politician
- 20 April – David Chalmers, philosopher and cognitive scientist
- 17 May – Mark Kratzmann, tennis player
- 3 June – Jamie O'Neal, musical artist
- 1 July – Simon Arkell, pole vaulter
- 30 July – Allan Langer, rugby league player
- 3 August – Simon Shirley, decathlete
- 4 September – Gary Neiwand, track cyclist
- 13 September – Louis Mandylor, actor
- 15 November – Liane Moriarty, author
- 17 November – Kate Ceberano, singer
- 28 November – Scott Sunderland, road cyclist
- 16 December – Richard Scolyer, pathologist (d. 2026)
- 18 December – Melina Bath, politician and schoolteacher

== Deaths ==
- 21 January
  - Sir Richard L. Butler, 31st Premier of South Australia (b. 1885)
  - Sir Shane Paltridge, Western Australian politician (b. 1910)
- 7 March – Bill Cahill, Australian rules footballer (Essendon) (b. 1911)
- 25 May – Sir Vernon Sturdee, general (b. 1890)
- 5 June – William Beak, cattle breeder (b. 1878)
- 6 July – Harold Breen, public servant (b. 1893)
- 3 August – John Cockle, New South Wales politician (b. 1908)
- 22 September – Ray Maher, New South Wales politician (b. 1911)
- 3 October – May Mabel Adamson, school principal (b. 1891)
- 13 November – Esna Boyd, tennis player (b. 1899)

== See also ==
- List of Australian films of the 1960s
