= 1963 in Australia =

- Monarch: Elizabeth II
- Governor-General: William Sidney
- Prime minister: Robert Menzies
- Population: 10,950,379
- Australian of the Year: John Carew Eccles
- Elections: Federal, QLD

The following lists events that happened during 1963 in Australia.

- Decades: 1940s; 1950s; 1960s; 1970s; 1980s
- See also: 1963 in Australian literature; Other events of 1963; Federal election; Timeline of Australian history

== Incumbents ==
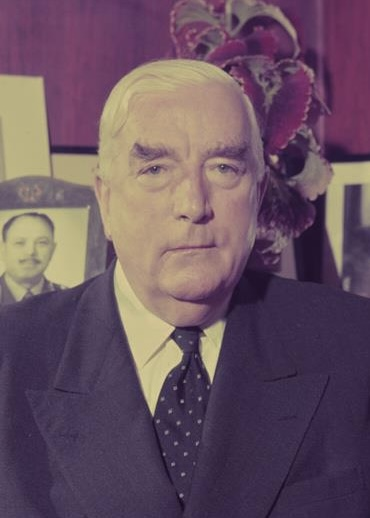
Sir Robert Menzies

- Monarch – Elizabeth II
- Prime Minister – Robert Menzies
- Governor General – William Sidney, 1st Viscount De L'Isle
- Chief Justice – Sir Owen Dixon

=== State Premiers ===
- Premier of New South Wales – Robert Heffron
- Premier of South Australia – Sir Thomas Playford
- Premier of Queensland – Frank Nicklin
- Premier of Tasmania – Eric Reece
- Premier of Western Australia – David Brand
- Premier of Victoria – Henry Bolte

=== State Governors ===
- Governor of New South Wales – Sir Eric Woodward
- Governor of Queensland – Sir Henry Abel Smith
- Governor of South Australia – Sir Edric Bastyan
- Governor of Tasmania – Sir Thomas Corbett, 2nd Baron Rowallan (until 25 March) then Sir Charles Gairdner
- Governor of Western Australia – Sir Charles Gairdner (until 25 October) then Sir Douglas Kendrew
- Governor of Victoria – Sir Dallas Brooks (until 8 May) then Sir Rohan Delacombe

== Events ==
- John Carew Eccles is announced as the Australian of the Year
- The first stage of the Ord River Scheme is completed
- British nuclear tests at Maralinga ceased
- March – a special federal conference of the Australian Labor Party was called on the building of a North-west Cape communications facility which would support the US nuclear submarine capability. Despite the opposition of the Left faction, the Australian Labor Party National Executive voted narrowly to support the base.
- 21 March – At the conference, Arthur Calwell and Gough Whitlam were photographed outside the venue at Kingston in Canberra. Although Calwell was the Leader of the Opposition, neither man was a member of the federal executive. Menzies jibed that the ALP was ruled by "36 faceless men".
- 14 August – Yolngu people petitioned the Australian House of Representatives with a bark petition after the government sold part of the Arnhem Land reserve on 13 March to a bauxite mining company. The government did not consult the traditional owners. When bauxite mining at Nhulunbuy near Yirrkala went ahead, the Yolngu took their case against the mining company to the Northern Territory Supreme Court. Despite their claim not being upheld in the 1971 court decision, non-indigenous Australians were alerted to the need for indigenous representation in such decisions, and a permanent parliamentary standing committee was created to scrutinise developments at Yirrkala, among other initiatives related to the indigenous people's moral right to their lands.
- 1 November – Indigenous Australians could vote in federal elections on the same basis as other electors when an amendment to the Commonwealth Electoral Act became law. The November 1963 election was the first federal election for Indigenous people in Western Australia, Queensland and the Northern Territory. Indigenous voting rights in other states had been in place since 1949.
- 15 November - The Queensland Police Service raids the town of Mapoon, forcing residents at gunpoint to leave their houses and board a boat for relocation 200 km to the north.
- 30 November – Federal election: The Coalition government was returned with an increased majority of 10 seats over the Australian Labor Party. The election was for the House of Representatives only.

== Science and technology ==
- John Carew Eccles shares the Nobel Prize in Physiology or Medicine for his work on the synapse
- 3 December – Australians could connect more easily by telephone with the rest of the world by International Direct Dialling with the opening of the Commonwealth Pacific Cable System (COMPAC). This was part of a scheme to connect the British Commonwealth by telephone.

== Arts and literature ==
Careful, He Might Hear You by Sumner Locke Elliott is awarded the Miles Franklin Literary Award

== Film ==
Short films produced in Australia included the following screened at the Venice Film Festival

- Adam and Eve – Dusan Marek
- Along the Sepik – Ian Dunlop
- Russell Drysdale – Dahl Collings
- Sidney Nolan – Dahl Collings
- They Found a Cave – Andrew Steane – XV Int. Festival Films for Young People
- William Dobell – Dahl Collings

Others:

- The Queen Returns – The 1963 Australian visit of Her Majesty The Queen and His Royal Highness The Duke of Edinburgh was filmed by the Commonwealth Film Unit. Much of the 30-minute film is devoted to Canberra and its history as the Queen's visit coincided with Canberra's Jubilee Celebrations – 50 years since the founding of the city.

== Television ==
Nine Network founded as the "National Television Network"

The panel show Beauty and the Beast premieres on the Seven Network.

== Sport ==
- Athletics
  - 3 March – Dixie Willis breaks Lyudmila Shevtsova's world record (2:04.3) in the women's 800 metres, clocking 2:01.2 in Perth.
- Cricket
  - Victoria wins the Sheffield Shield
  - Australia draws with England 1–1 and retains The Ashes
- Football
  - Brisbane Rugby League premiership: Norths defeated Wests 18–8 ** New South Wales Rugby League premiership: St. George defeated Western Suburbs 8–3 ** South Australian National Football League premiership: won by Port Adelaide
  - Victorian Football League premiership: Geelong defeated Hawthorn 109-60
- Golf
  - Australian Open: won by Gary Player
  - Australian PGA Championship: won by Col Johnston
- Horse racing
  - Arctic Star wins the AJC Oaks
  - Sometime wins the Caulfield Cup
  - Summer Regent wins the Cox Plate
  - Pago Pago wins the Golden Slipper
  - Gatum Gatum wins the Melbourne Cup
- Motor racing
  - The Australian Grand Prix was held at Warwick Farm, and was won by Jack Brabham driving a Brabham Climax
  - The Armstrong 500 was held at Bathurst, and was won by Harry Firth and Bob Jane driving a Ford Cortina Mk 1 GT
- Squash
  - British Open Squash Championships: Heather Blundell wins the Women's Championship
- Tennis
  - Australian Open men's singles: Roy Emerson defeats Ken Fletcher 6–3 6–3 6–1 ** Australian Open women's singles: Margaret Court defeats Jan Lehane O'Neill 6–2 6–2
  - Davis Cup: Australia is defeated by the United States 2–3 in the 1963 Davis Cup final
  - French Open: Roy Emerson wins the Men's Singles
  - French Open: Lesley Turner Bowrey wins the Women's Singles
  - French Open: Roy Emerson and Manuel Santana win the Men's Doubles
  - US Open: Robyn Ebbern and Margaret Court win the Women's Doubles
  - Wimbledon: Margaret Court becomes the first Australian to win the Ladies' Singles
- Yachting
  - Astor takes line honours and Freya wins on handicap in the Sydney to Hobart Yacht Race

== Births ==
- 1 January – Glenn Trimble, cricketer
- 5 January – Vanessa Browne-Ward, high jumper
- 13 January – Peter Scully, criminal
- 18 February — Cameron Williams, TV Presenter
- 2 March – Anthony Albanese, politician
- 17 March – John Platten, Australian Rules football player
- 29 March – Elle Macpherson, model
- 31 March – Paul Mercurio, actor and dancer
- 26 April – Colin Scotts, Australian-born American football player
- 8 May – Anthony Field, Australian guitarist, songwriter, producer, and actor (The Cockroaches and The Wiggles)
- 14 June – Grant Kenny, iron man and canoeist
- 27 June – Paul Roos, footballer and coach
- 8 September – Danny Frawley, Australian rules football player (died 2019)
- 13 September – Phillip Dutton, equestrian rider
- 30 September
  - Stan Grant, journalist
  - Greg Williams, Australian Rules football player
- 23 October – Craig Bradley, Australian Rules football player
- 15 November – Benny Elias, rugby league player
- 16 November – Tim Ferguson, comedian (Doug Anthony All Stars)
- 28 November – Matt Parkinson, Australian comedian, actor, radio presenter, and game show personality
- 10 December – John Elias (in Lebanon), rugby league player and coach
- 30 December – Alister Henskens, politician

== Deaths ==
- 19 March – Lionel Hill, Premier of South Australia (born 1881)
- 28 May – Margaret Preston, artist (born 1875)
- 1 June – Walter Lee, Premier of Tasmania (born 1874)
- 19 June – Amy Hannah Adamson, school principal (born 1893)
- 21 June – Harvey Sutton, track and field athlete (born 1882)
- 10 October – Roy Cazaly, Australian Rules football player (born 1893)
- 2 November – Daniel Mannix, Archbishop of Melbourne (born 1864)

== See also ==
- List of Australian films of the 1960s
