= List of Australian films of the 1960s =

This is a list of Australian films of the 1960s. For a complete alphabetical list, see Category:Australian films.

== 1960s ==
Title	Director	Cast	Genre	Notes
1960
Shadow of the Boomerang				
The Sundowners	Fred Zinnemann	Deborah Kerr, Robert Mitchum, Peter Ustinov, Glynis Johns, Dina Merrill, Michael Anderson Jnr, Lola Brooks, John Meillon, Jack Fegan, Gwen Plumb, Leonard Teale, Chips Rafferty	Drama Feature film	Australian/British/American co-production
Three in a Million				AFI winner for Best Film
1961
Bungala Boys				
1962
Adam and Eve	Dusan Marek		Short/Animation	
Bypass to Life				AFI winner for Best Film
Night Freighter				AFI winner for Best Film
They Found a Cave	Andrew Steane	Beryl Meekin, Mervyn Wiss, Anne Davis, Christopher Horner, Peter Conrad, Michael Nation, Michael Woolford, Michael Brady, Cecily McKinley, Joseph Smith, Barbara Manning	Adventure / Family Short Feature film	
1963
House with a Secret				
The Land That Waited				AFI winner for Best Film
1964
The Dancing Class				AFI winner for Best Film
Forgotten Loneliness				
I The Aboriginal	Cecil Holmes			AFI winner for Best Film
1965
Clay	Giorgio Mangiamele	Janine Lebedew, George Dixon, Chris Tsalikis, Claude Thomas, Robert Clarke, Lola Russell, Cole Turnley, Sheila Florance	Drama Feature film	Entered into the 1965 Cannes Film Festival
Funny Things Happen Down Under	Joe McCormick	Bruce Barry, Susanne Haworth, Ian Turpie, Olivia Newton-John, Gary Gray, David Morgan, Howard Morrison, Rodney Perlman	Drama / Family TV film	Olivia Newton-John's first film, based on a TV show called The Terrific Adventures of the Terrible Ten
The Legend of Damien Parer				AFI winner for Best Film
Stronger Since The War				AFI winner for Best Film
The Warning	Chris Löfvén		Short	
1966
Blunderball, or from Dr. Nofinger with Hate	Albie Thoms	George Brandt, Richard Brennan, Louis Davis, Clive Graham, Christine Hill, Arthur King, Terence McMullen, Brian Mills, Richard Neville	Short/Comedy	
Concerto for Orchestra				AFI winner for Best Film
Nightwait				
The Story of Making the Film They're a Weird Mob				
They're a Weird Mob	Michael Powell	Ed Devereaux, Walter Chiari, Clare Dunne, Chips Rafferty, Alida Chelli, Judith Arthy, Slim de Grey, Jeanie Drynan, Anne Haddy, Gita Revira, Tony Bonner, Graham Kennedy, Muriel Steinbeck, John Meillon, Jacki Weaver	Comedy / Drama Feature film	Based on a novel of the same title
1967
Cardin in Australia				AFI winner for Best Film
Journey Out of Darkness	James Trainor	Konrad Matthaei, Ed Devereaux, Kamahl, Marie Clarke, Betty Campbell, Ronald Morse	Drama / Thriller Feature film US Co-production	
Shades of Puffing Billy	Antonio Colacino		Short/Documentary	
The Pudding Thieves				
Wheels Across a Wilderness	Malcolm Leyland, Mike Leyland		Documentary	
1968
The Change at Groote				AFI winner for Best Film
The Pictures That Moved: Australian Cinema				
Ride a White Horse				
Skindeep				
The Talgai Skull				AFI winner for Best Film
Time in Summer				
1969
2000 Weeks	Tim Burstall	Mark McManus, Jeanie Drynan, Eileen Chapman, David Turnbull, Graeme Blundell, Bruce Anderson, Anne Charleston, Nicholas McCallum, John Frawley, Michael Duffield	Drama Feature film	Entered into the 6th Moscow International Film Festival
Age of Consent	Michael Powell	James Mason, Helen Mirren, Jack MacGowran, Slim DeGrey, Harold Hopkins, Michael Boddy, Frank Thring, Andonia Katsaros, Clarissa Kaye, Slim de Grey, Tommy Hanlon Jnr, Neva Carr-Glynn, Judy McGrath	Drama / Romance Feature film	
Color Me Dead	Eddie Davis	Tom Tryon, Carolyn Jones, Rick Jason, Penny Sugg, Sandy Harbutt, Suzy Kendall, Lyndall Moor, Tom Oliver, Barrie Chase, Margot Reid, Patricia Conolly, Reg Gillam, Michael Laurence, Peter Sumner, Tony Ward	Mystery / Thriller Feature film	
Headland 69	Kevin Kearney	Tully	Musical/Documentary	UBU News No. 14 April
The Intruders	Lee Robinson	Ed Devereaux, Tony Bonner, Ken James, Gary Pankhurst, Jack Hume, John Unicombe, Ron Graham, Jeanie Drynan, Kevin Miles, Jeff Ashby, Robert Bruning, Liza Goddard	Adventure / Drama / Family Feature film(Based on the 'Skippy' TV series	aka Skippy And The Intruders / Mallacoota (Original working title)
It Takes All Kinds	Eddie Davis	Robert Lansing, Vera Miles, Barry Sullivan, Penny Sugg, Sid Melton, Dennis Miller, Allen Bickford, Ted Hepple, Chris Christensen, Rod Mullinar, Roger Ward, Tommy Dysart, Alister Smart, Reg Gorman	Drama / Thriller Feature film US Co-production	
Jack and Jill: A Postscript	Phillip Adams (also wrote, produced, cinematographer)	Anthony Ward, Judy Leach, Stanley Randall, Jean Higgs, Phyllis Freeman, Gerry Humphries, Bob Cornish, Gordon Rumph, Sylvia Thredfall, Ray Watts, Claire Humphries-Hunt, Lindsay Howatt	Drama Short Feature film	AFI winner for Best Film
Little Jungle Boy	Mende Brown	Rahman Rahmann, Mike Dorsey, Michael Pate, Lesley Berryman, Niki Huen, Noel Ferrier, Willie Fennell	Adventure / Family Feature film	
Sampan				
Savage Shadows				
Stockman Joe				
Strange Holiday	Mende Brown	Jaeme Hamilton, Mark Healey, Jamie Massang, Mark Lee, Van Alexander, Ross Williams, Carmen Duncan, Ben Gabriel, Larry Crane, Reg Gorman, Nigel Lovell	Adventure / Family Feature film	
Thunderbolt				
Will Ye No' Come Back Again?				
You Can't See 'Round Corners	David Cahill	Ken Shorter, Rowena Wallace, Carmen Duncan, Judith Fisher, Lyndall Barbour, Slim de Grey, Max Cullen, Max Phipps, Vincent Gil, Henri Szeps, The Atlantics, Kevin Leslie, Goff Vockler, Lou Vernon	Drama Feature film	Based on 'You Can't See Round Corners' TV series (1967–1969)

== See also ==
- 1960 in Australia
- 1961 in Australia
- 1962 in Australia
- 1963 in Australia
- 1964 in Australia
- 1965 in Australia
- 1966 in Australia
- 1967 in Australia
- 1968 in Australia
- 1969 in Australia
