= Christopher Howland =

English cricketer

Personal information
- Full name: Christopher Burfield Howland
- Born: 6 February 1936; Whitstable, Kent
- Died: 14 May 2010 (aged 74); Farnborough, London
- Batting: Right-handed
- Role: Wicket-keeper

Domestic team information
- Years: Team
- 1958–1960: Cambridge University
- 1960: Sussex
- 1965: Kent
- FC debut: 19 May 1956 Combined Services v Glamorgan
- Last FC: 7 September 1968 MCC v Ireland

Career statistics
Competition	First-class
Matches	64
Runs scored	1,629
Batting average	16.96
100s/50s	1/5
Top score	124
Balls bowled	12
Wickets	0
Bowling average	–
5 wickets in innings	–
10 wickets in match	–
Best bowling	–
Catches/stumpings	130/21
- Source: CricInfo, 7 November 2017

Christopher Burfield Howland (6 February 1936 – 14 May 2010) was an English amateur cricketer who mainly played for Cambridge University Cricket Club. He was a wicket-keeper who played for a number of amateur teams and worked in the City of London.

== Early life ==
Howland was born in Whitstable in Kent in 1936 and educated at Dulwich College and Clare College, Cambridge. He played cricket for his school, for Beckenham Cricket Club and, in 1955, for the Kent Second XI before serving in the British Army on National Service. He made his first-class cricket debut for the Combined Services team whilst in the Army, playing against Glamorgan in May 1956 and played in two other non-first-class matches for the Army team.

== University and cricket ==
After going up to Cambridge University in 1957, Howland played for the University cricket team for three years, making a total of 48 first-class appearances for the team, having found himself in the Cambridge team following the death of the Australian Brian Swift prior to the 1958 season. He captained the team in his final year and gained his Blue in 1958, playing in all three University Matches against Oxford whilst he was a student. He toured South America with Marylebone Cricket Club (MCC) in 1958/59 and Canada with the club in 1959 and played for the Gentlemen against the Players in 1959.

In 1960 he played in four first-class matches for Sussex County Cricket Club after graduating, but his career in the City meant that he was unable to commit to playing cricket at first-class level, although he remained a keen club player and appeared in six first-class matches for MCC between 1961 and 1968 and two for Free Foresters in 1961. He played twice for Kent County Cricket Club in 1965 and made his last first-class appearance against Ireland in Dublin in 1968.

== Later life ==
Howland was the Chairman of the Lord's Taverners in 1978–79 and served on a number of committees at Lord's. His brother, Peter Howland, also played first-class cricket for Cambridge University in 1969.

In 1983 Howland joined the fledgling cable television sports channel Screensport as marketing director. He died in Farnborough in 2010 aged 74.
