= Acquisition of Land Act 1967 =

Legislation in Queensland, Australia

Parliament of Queensland
- Long title: An Act to consolidate and amend the law relating to the acquisition of land for public works and other public purposes, and for other purposes
- Enacted by: Parliament of Queensland

Repeals
- Public Works Land Resumption Act 1906; Railway Acts 1914
- Status: In force

The Acquisition of Land Act 1967 (ALA) is an act of the Parliament of Queensland. The ALA establishes authority for the Queensland Government to acquire land for specific purposes including the creation of roads, railways, and other essential infrastructure. The acquisition of land in this way is referred to in Australian legal jurisdictions as ‘compulsory acquisition’, known internationally as eminent domain. The ALA does not allow such acquisition for a private purpose, only by the State for one of the purposes specified.

The Coordinator General of Queensland is responsible for acquiring land for the completion of infrastructure projects. Any land or property can be acquired under the Act.

== History ==
Compulsory acquisition in Queensland was originally regulated by the Public Works Land Resumption Act 1906. The ALA inherits much of its substance from this legislation, particularly its compensation provisions.

== Process ==
The ALA provides for a variety of specific purposes under which land can be acquired. Examples include transportation, the environment, health, water, planning, and essential public infrastructure and services. The State of Queensland may acquire land for these specific reasons under the ALA, private acquisition is not provided for. Where the government plans to acquire land for a specific purpose, the owner is notified through a Notice of Intention to Resume. An owner can object, however if the relevant Minister is satisfied the acquisition is appropriate then their landholder right is converted to a right to claim compensation for loss of land. There is no possibility to appeal a decision of compulsory acquisition.

The acquisition of land under the ALA can be controversial. Moreton Bar Regional Council in 2020 sought to acquire privately owned land under the ALA in order to create a retarding basin.

== Provisions ==
=== Part I - Preliminary ===
Sets out an introduction of the Act, including definition of terms and its relationship with other acts. The part also deals with the Act's relationship with native title.

=== Part II - Taking of land ===
Enables ‘constructing authorities’ to acquire land for public purposes. Sets out the processes by which this occurs, including with or without agreement of the title holder.

=== Part III - Discontinuance of taking of land ===
The process by which a constructing authority can discontinue the resumption of land.

=== Part IV - Compensation ===
Relates to a number of issues regarding compensation including:

- Who can claim compensation
- Assessment of compensation
- Costs, interest, mortgages, and rent
- Taxes, rates and charges

== Amendments ==
=== Acquisition of Land and Other Legislation Amendment Act 2008 ===
This amendment, passed in 2009, made numerous and substantive changes to the ALA. It codified the need for a body corporate to be served with appropriate notice if common property is to be acquired. This amendment also introduced a requirement to provide advice of rights to compensation.

== Bibliography ==
Academic literature

- Powell, Peter (2009). "Recent Amendments to the Acquisition of Land Act 1967". Local Government Law Review. 99: 12–15 – via LexisNexis.
- Ritchie, Marcus (2013). "Compulsory acquisition of privately owned land in the Australian jurisdictions: Is the (compulsory acquisition) cart before the (planning and environment) horse". Australian Property Law Journal. 22: 28–69 – via LexisNexis.

Dunphy, Barry; Dwyer, Pat; Doran, Jamie; Pollard, Majella (23 February 2009). "Acquisition of Land Act 1967 (Qld) to be substantially amended". Clayton Utz.

Legal cases
