= Aquila Shoes =

Australian shoe manufacturer

- Industry: Shoes
- Founded: 1958
- Founder: Tony Longo
- Headquarters: Melbourne, Australia
- Number of locations: 30
- Area served: Australia and New Zealand
- Key people: Vance Dickie
- Products: Shoes, Wallets, Socks, Belts
- Brands: Aquila
- Website: www.aquila.com.au

Aquila Shoes is an Australian shoe manufacturing company founded in 1958 by Antonio Longo. He was born in San Marco in Lamis, Italy on 18 October 1920 before he immigrated to Australia in 1949.

== History ==
Aquila Shoes began producing Italian men's footwear in a small Melbourne workshop in 1958.

On 1 December 1964, Aquila opened a new factory and manufacturing plant in the inner Melbourne suburb of North Fitzroy. The factory manufactured 100,000 pairs of shoes per year at full capacity. In 1969 the company announced plans to join the Melbourne Stock Exchange via a backdoor listing.

The company opened its first retail store in 1975 in Melbourne's central business district. Later in 1975, a second store was opened in Sydney. Over the next few decades, the company expanded its retail operations across Australia and New Zealand. The founder, Tony Longo, died in 1989 at the age of 68 or 69. The business was continued by his sons.

In 2012, Aquila expanded into menswear and fashion accessories.

In 2016, Aquila significantly grew in size, doubling their amount of physical locations via an expansion strategy that included a partnership for in-store concessions with department store chain Myer. In the same year, Blue Sky Alternative Investments acquired a 70 percent stake in the company for A$25.2 million.

As of 2022, Aquila operated 55 retail stores in Melbourne, Sydney, Brisbane, Adelaide, and Perth. In November 2022, Aquila's ownership began to explore selling the company.
