= Kevin Pearce (cricketer) =

Australian cricketer (born 1960)

Kevin Dudley Pearce (born 29 February 1960 in Devonport, Tasmania) is an Australian former cricketer who played one first-class cricket match for the Tasmanian Tigers.
