= Tom Crebbin =

Australian rules footballer

Personal information
- Born: 22 June 1964 (age 62)
- Original team: Berwick
- Height: 175 cm (5 ft 9 in)
- Weight: 74 kg (163 lb)

Playing career^{1}
Years	Club	Games (Goals)
1985	Richmond	7 (3)
1986	St Kilda	1 (1)
Total		8 (4)
- ^{1} Playing statistics correct to the end of 1986.

Tom Crebbin (born 22 June 1964) is a former Australian rules footballer who played with Richmond and St Kilda in the Victorian Football League (VFL).

Crebbin, who went to Haileybury College, played his early football at Berwick. A midfielder, Crebbin made seven appearances for Richmond in the 1985 VFL season, debuting in round 13. He then joined St Kilda, but would only play one league game for the club, against Carlton at Princes Park in 1986.
