= Brian Swift (cricketer) =

Australian cricketer

Personal information
- Full name: Brian Tennant Swift
- Born: 9 September 1937; Adelaide, South Australia, Australia
- Died: 8 March 1958 (aged 20); Higham, Suffolk, England
- Batting: Right-handed
- Role: Wicket-keeper

Domestic team information
- Years: Team
- 1957: Cambridge University

Career statistics
Competition	First-class
Matches	17
Runs scored	160
Batting average	10.00
100s/50s	–/–
Top score	25
Catches/stumpings	37/10
- Source: Cricinfo, 10 January 2022

Brian Tennant Swift (9 September 1937 — 8 March 1958) was an Australian first-class cricketer.

The only son of Sir Brian Herbert Swift, a noted obstetrician and gynaecologist, he was born at Adelaide in September 1937. He was educated at St Peter's College in Adelaide, before following in his father's footsteps to study in England at the University of Cambridge, where he matriculated to study agricultural science at Caius College.

While studying at Cambridge, Swift played first-class cricket for Cambridge University Cricket Club in 1957, making seventeen appearances as a wicket-keeper. He took 37 catches and made 10 stumpings in his capacity as wicket-keeper, in addition to scoring 160 runs with a highest score of 25. He was described by Wisden as a "very promising cricketer", who also noted that his return as wicket-keeper "was the best for Cambridge for a good many years". Swift was killed in a road accident on 8 March 1958 at Higham near Bury St Edmunds, when his car was involved in a collision with a lorry. In the aftermath of his death, Cambridge captain Ted Dexter replaced Swift in the Cambridge side with wicket-keeper Christopher Howland for the 1958 season.
