= The Pudding Thieves =

- Directed by: Brian Davies
- Written by: Brian Davies
- Produced by: Brian Davies
- Starring: Bernice Murphy
- Cinematography: Sasha Trikojus
- Music by: George Tibbits the Wild Cherries the Loved Ones; Ian Topless
- Release date: 17 September 1967
- Running time: 54 minutes
- Country: Australia
- Language: English

Pudding Thieves is a 1967 Australian film. It was the first film from the "Carlton school".

== Plot ==
Bill and George work as photographers, with a sideline in pornography. Bill's girlfriend discovers this and leaves him in disgust. Bill betrays George to the police.

== Cast ==
- Bernice Murphy as Pete
- Bill Morgan as Bill
- George Tibbits as George
- Tina Date as George's girl
- Burt Cooper as Pimp
- Dorothy Bradley as religious woman
- George Dixon as Bill's friend
- David Kendall as rival pornographer
- Julien Pringle as photographer
- Bert Deling as pimp
- Mandy Boyd as advertising girl
- Nick Yardley
- Chris Maudson
- Peter Nicholls as the buyer
- Sue Ingleton as model
- Pat Black as model
- Penny Brown as model

== Production ==
The film was shot from 1963 to 1967 on borrowed 16 mm film equipment. It was largely funded by director Brian Davies who was a director at La Mama Theatre. The script evolved during production and three separate endings were shot.

== Reception ==
The film was not widely seen but was influential as many people associated with La Mama became key players in the Australian film revival of the 1970s. The film was screened at the Melbourne International Film Festival (MIFF) in 2022.
