= Edric Bastyan =

Lieutenant-General Sir Edric Bastyan KCMG KCVO KBE CB
- Sir Edric Bastyan (centre)

20th Governor of Tasmania
- In office 2 December 1968 – 30 November 1973
- Monarch: Elizabeth II
- Preceded by: Sir Charles Gairdner
- Succeeded by: Sir Stanley Burbury

25th Governor of South Australia
- In office 4 April 1961 – 1 June 1968
- Monarch: Elizabeth II
- Preceded by: Sir Robert George
- Succeeded by: Sir James Harrison

Personal details
- Born: Edric Montague Bastyan; 5 April 1903 Seaforth, Lancashire
- Died: 6 October 1980 (aged 77) North Adelaide, South Australia
- Spouse(s): Marjorie Dorothy Bowle; Victoria Eugenie Helen Bett

Military service
- Allegiance: United Kingdom
- Branch/service: British Army
- Years of service: 1923–1960
- Rank: Lieutenant-General
- Unit: Sherwood Foresters; West Yorkshire Regiment; Royal Irish Fusiliers
- Commands: Commander British Forces in Hong Kong
- Battles/wars: Arab revolt in Palestine; Second World War
- Awards: Knight Commander of the Order of St Michael and St George; Knight Commander of the Royal Victorian Order; Knight Commander of the Order of the British Empire; Companion of the Order of the Bath; Mentioned in Despatches

Lieutenant-General Sir Edric Montague Bastyan, KCMG, KCVO, KBE, CB (5 April 1903 – 6 October 1980) was a senior British Army officer, who became Governor of South Australia from 4 April 1961 until 1 June 1968 then Governor of Tasmania from 2 December 1968 until 30 November 1973. He was the last British person to be governor of either state.

== Military career ==
After completing his studies at the Royal Military College, Sandhurst, Bastyan was commissioned as a second lieutenant into the British Army's Sherwood Foresters on 30 August 1923, and promoted to lieutenant on 30 August 1925. He was promoted to captain in the West Yorkshire Regiment on 4 April 1935 and attended the Staff College, Camberley from 1936 to 1937, transferring to the Royal Irish Fusiliers in 1937, and seeing service in Palestine from 1938 to 1939. Bastyan was promoted to major on 30 August 1940.

From November 1939 to June 1941, during the Second World War, Bastyan served as a GSO II in Palestine with the Royal Irish Fusiliers and was mentioned in despatches in March 1941. He served as assistant quarter-master general in the Middle East from July 1941 to May 1942, subsequently as deputy director of the Higher Commander's Course from May to October of that year. Bastyan was appointed an Officer of the Order of the British Empire in September 1942, by which time he was a temporary lieutenant colonel. He was promoted to temporary brigadier the following month and confirmed as a war substantive lieutenant colonel in November 1942. Bastyan served as a temporary brigadier (quartermaster) from then until January 1944, when he was appointed a Commander of the Order of the British Empire. He was appointed a Companion of the Order of the Bath in August 1944.

In December 1944, Bastyan was appointed an acting major general (Administration, Allied Land Forces, South East Asia). He was promoted to the permanent rank of colonel in July 1945, and confirmed as temporary major general in October 1946. He was promoted to substantive major-general on 26 January 1948, with seniority from 13 April 1946.

After the war, Bastyan, after serving as an instructor at the Imperial Defence College, became Chief of Staff at British Army of the Rhine in October 1946 (which involved looking after the logistics for the Berlin airlift between 1946 and 1948). He went on to be Chief of Staff at Eastern Command in July 1949, Director of Staff Duties at the War Office in November 1950 and General Officer Commanding 53rd (Welsh) Infantry Division in October 1952. After that he became Deputy Adjutant-General at the War Office in March 1955 and then Commander of British Forces in Hong Kong in June 1957. He retired from the British Army in June 1960 and was appointed Governor of South Australia on 4 April 1961.

== Vice-Regal career ==
On two occasions during his period as governor in South Australia, the elections did not result in a clear majority. In both 1962 and 1968, rather than make a precipitate decision to select the premier from the party with the largest minority (and more than 50% of the votes), he bided time and waited for parliament to meet. In both cases, the quick decision would have turned out to be wrong, and the South Australian House of Assembly selected the premier from the other party. In 1962, this allowed the Liberal and Country League Playford government to continue rather than the Labor Party led by Frank Walsh. In 1968, the Labor government of Don Dunstan lost to the Liberal and Country League led by Steele Hall.

Bastyan's term in office in Tasmania was relatively uneventful, though he did have to deal, after the 1969 State election, with a deadlocked House of Assembly where both the ALP and Liberals had the same number of seats. The matter was resolved by Kevin Lyons, the lone representative of the tiny Centre Party entering into a coalition with the Liberals.

== Recognition and honours ==
The Bastyan Wing at the State Library of South Australia was named in his honour, and officially opened on 25 May 1967 by the Premier of South Australia, Frank Walsh.

== Bibliography ==
- "E. M. Bastyan". King's College London Archives. Archived from the original on 23 December 2004.
- "List of commanders in Hong Kong". Queen's University.
- Harfield, A. G. (1990). British and Indian armies on the China coast 1785–1985. A. & J. Partnership. ISBN 0-9516065-0-6.
- Smart, Nick (2005). Biographical Dictionary of British Generals of the Second World War. Barnesley: Pen & Sword. ISBN 1844150496.

Military offices
Preceded by Ernest Down	GOC 53rd (Welsh) Infantry Division; 1952–1955	Succeeded by William Cox
Preceded by Sir William Stratton	Commander of British Forces in Hong Kong; 1957–1960	Succeeded by Sir Roderick McLeod
Government offices
Preceded by Sir Robert George	Governor of South Australia; 1961–1968	Succeeded by Sir James Harrison
Preceded by Sir Charles Gairdner	Governor of Tasmania; 1968–1973	Succeeded by Sir Stanley Burbury
