= Charles Gairdner =

British Army officer (1898–1983)

Lieutenant-General Sir Charles Gairdner GBE KCMG KCVO CB
- Gairdner in 1955

21st Governor of Western Australia
- In office 6 November 1951 – 26 June 1963
- Monarchs: George VI (1951–1952); Elizabeth II (1952–1963)
- Premier: Sir Ross McLarty (1951–1953); Albert Hawke (1953–1959); Sir David Brand (1959–1963)
- Preceded by: Sir James Mitchell
- Succeeded by: Sir Douglas Kendrew

19th Governor of Tasmania
- In office 24 September 1963 – 11 July 1968
- Monarch: Elizabeth II
- Preceded by: The Lord Rowallan
- Succeeded by: Sir Edric Bastyan

Personal details
- Born: 20 March 1898 Batavia, Netherlands East Indies
- Died: 22 February 1983 (aged 84) Nedlands, Western Australia
- Spouse: Evelyn Constance Handcock
- Profession: Army officer

Military service
- Allegiance: United Kingdom
- Branch/service: British Army
- Years of service: 1916–1949
- Rank: Lieutenant-General
- Unit: Royal Artillery
- Commands: 8th Armoured Division (1942–43); 6th Armoured Division (1941–42); 10th Royal Hussars (1937–40)
- Battles/wars: First World War; Second World War
- Awards: Knight Grand Cross of the Order of the British Empire; Knight Commander of the Order of St Michael and St George; Knight Commander of the Royal Victorian Order; Companion of the Order of the Bath; Mentioned in Despatches; Medal of Freedom (United States)

Lieutenant-General Sir Charles Henry Gairdner, GBE, KCMG, KCVO, CB (20 March 1898 – 22 February 1983) was a senior British Army officer who later occupied two viceregal positions in Australia. Born in Batavia (now Jakarta) in the Dutch East Indies, he was brought up in Ireland, and educated at Repton School and the Royal Military Academy, Woolwich, in England. Having served on active duty during the First World War, in which he sustained a serious wound to his right leg, Gairdner spent time at the Staff College, Camberley in the interwar period, and served as commanding officer of the 10th Royal Hussars, 6th Armoured Division and 8th Armoured Division during the Second World War. He retired from the army in 1949 and was appointed Governor of Western Australia in 1951, a position in which he served until 1963, when he assumed the role of Governor of Tasmania until 1968. Gairdner died in Nedlands, at the age of 84, and was awarded a state funeral.

== Early life ==
Gairdner was born in Batavia, Netherlands East Indies (now Jakarta, Indonesia) on 20 March 1898. Brought up in County Galway in the west of Ireland, he was educated at Repton School in England, and the Royal Military Academy, Woolwich. He married the Hon. Evelyn Constance Handcock, daughter of the 5th Baron Castlemaine, in 1925.

== Military career ==
Upon graduation, Gairdner was commissioned a second lieutenant in the artillery in May 1916 and sent to the Western Front. In this campaign, he sustained a serious wound to the right leg which necessitated numerous operations throughout his life and eventual amputation in 1976. After the war he transferred to cavalry. He spent two years at the Staff College, Camberley from 1933 to 1934. As a lieutenant colonel, from 1937 to 1940 he was the commanding officer of the 10th Royal Hussars, before being chief of staff of the 7th Armoured Division then General Officer Commanding of the 6th and 8th Armoured Divisions. Gairdner was General Sir Harold Alexander's Chief of Staff during the planning stage of Operation Husky but was relieved and went on to become Prime Minister Winston Churchill's personal emissary to Douglas MacArthur in the Far East. He was awarded the Medal of Freedom by the United States on 16 January 1947. He was appointed a Commander of the Order of the British Empire in 1941, Companion of the Order of the Bath in 1946 and Knight Commander of the Order of St Michael and St George in 1948.

== Governor of Western Australia and Tasmania ==
Gairdner's distinguished military career was rewarded in 1951 when he was appointed Governor of Western Australia. He was governor during a number of royal visits to Perth – the earliest being that of Queen Elizabeth II in 1954. His long residency in Western Australia was during a time when Perth and Western Australia were undergoing significant post-war change. He was very popular with the Western Australian public.

Gairdner's tenure was relatively free of political or constitutional crisis. When Labor's loss of the October 1955 Bunbury by-election resulted in the Albert Hawke government losing its parliamentary majority, the possibility was raised that the governor might have to exercise his reserve powers. However the parliament remained in recess until Labor won the ensuing 1956 general election. The Perth Chest Hospital was renamed Sir Charles Gairdner Hospital in his honour in May 1963. Gairdner stepped down from his post on 26 June 1963. He lobbied for the position of Governor of Tasmania and on 23 September 1963 was appointed for five years.

In February 1969 the Gairdners returned to Perth and settled at Peppermint Grove. Survived by his wife, Gairdner died on 22 February 1983 at Nedlands and was cremated after a state funeral.

Gairdner was a freemason. During his terms as both Governor of Western Australia and Governor of Tasmania, he was also Grand Master of the respective Grand Lodges.

== Bibliography ==
- Mead, Richard (2007). Churchill's Lions: a biographical guide to the key British generals of World War II. Stroud (UK): Spellmount. ISBN 978-1-86227-431-0.
- Smart, Nick (2005). Biographical Dictionary of British Generals of the Second World War. Barnesley: Pen & Sword. ISBN 1844150496.

Military offices
Preceded by Herbert Lumsden	GOC 6th Armoured Division; 1941–1942	Succeeded by Charles Keightley
Preceded by Charles Norman	GOC 8th Armoured Division; 1942–1943	Post disbanded
Government offices
Preceded by Sir James Mitchell	Governor of Western Australia; 1951–1963	Succeeded by Sir Douglas Kendrew
Preceded by The Lord Rowallan	Governor of Tasmania; 1963–1968	Succeeded by Sir Edric Bastyan
