= List of Royal Air Force commands =

This is a list of Royal Air Force commands, both past and present. Although the concept of a command dates back to the foundation of the Royal Air Force, the term command (as the name of a formation) was first used in purely RAF-context in 1936 when Bomber Command, Fighter Command, Coastal Command and Training Command were formed. Prior to the creation of these functional commands, the RAF used a geographical area command system. Since 1936, the RAF has made considerable use of the term "command". Until early 2007, the RAF had two commands, Strike Command and Personnel and Training Command, which were co-located at RAF High Wycombe. On 1 April 2007, the two were merged to form Air Command.

== Commands ==
Command	Formation	Disbandment	Controlled	Became
Air Command	April 2007	present		n/a
Air Support Command	August 1967	September 1972		No. 46 Group
Army Cooperation Command	December 1940	May 1943	No. 70 & 71 Groups	
Balloon Command	November 1938	June 1945		Balloon Wing
Bomber Command	July 1936	April 1968	All UK based Bomber groups	No. 1 (Bomber) Group
Coastal Command	May 1936	November 1969	All UK based Coastal groups	No. 18 (Maritime) Group
Ferry Command	July 1941	March 1943		No. 45 Group
Fighter Command	July 1936 October 1944	November 1943 April 1968	All UK based Fighter groups	Air Defence of Great Britain No. 11 Group
Flying Training Command	May 1940	June 1968	All UK based training groups No. 21, 23, 25, 50, 51, 54 Groups RAF	
Home Command	August 1950	March 1959		
Joint Helicopter Command	October 1999	2024	Most of the British Armed Forces helicopter assets	Joint Aviation Command
Joint Aviation Command	2024		Most of the British Armed Forces helicopter assets and the British Army's unmanned aerial systems	
Logistics Command	April 1994	April 2000	All Maintenance units	
Maintenance Command	April 1938	August 1973	All UK based Maintenance groups	
RAF Northern Ireland	August 1940	March 1950	All RAF units in Northern Ireland; No. 15 & 82 Groups RAF	
Personnel and Training Command	April 1994	April 2007		
Reserve Command	February 1939; January 1946	May 1940; August 1950	No. 50, 51 & 54 Groups Unknown	Disbanded Home Command
Signals Command	November 1958	January 1969	RAF Tangmere & RAF Watton	No. 90 (Signals) Group
Strike Command	April 1968	April 2007	No. 1, 2, 11, 18, 11/18 & 38 Groups	Air Command
Support Command	September 1973	April 1994		Personnel & Training Command; Logistics Command
Technical Training Command	May 1940	June 1968	No. 20, 22, 24, 26 & 72 Groups	
Training Command	May 1936 June 1968	May 1940 July 1977	No. 20, 21, 23, 24, 25, 26 Groups No. 22, 23 & 24 Groups	Split into Technical Training Command & Flying Training Command Support Command
Transport Command	March 1943	August 1967	No. 44, 45 & 216 Groups	Air Support Command
Air Defence of Great Britain	January 1925 November 1943	July 1936 October 1944	Wessex Bombing Area & Fighting Area Unknown	Disbanded Fighter Command
No. 1 Area	April 1918	May 1918	No.1 - 5 Groups, No. 6 (Equipment) Group and Home Defence units within 27, 49 and 50 Wings	South-Eastern Area
No. 2 Area	April 1918	May 1918	No. 7 - 10 Groups, No. 11 (Equipment) Group and Home Defence units at Gosport	South-Western Area
No. 3 Area	April 1918	May 1918	No. 12 - 14 Groups, No. 15 (Equipment) Group and Home Defence units within 48 Wing	Midland Area
No. 4 Area	April 1918	May 1918	No. 16 - 18 Groups, No. 19 (Equipment) Group and Home Defence units within 46 Wing	North-Eastern Area
No. 5 Area	April 1918	May 1918	No. 20 - 22 Groups, No. 23 (Equipment) Group and units in Ireland	North-Western Area
Training Division RFC	1917	1918	Northern, Southern and Eastern Training Brigades	
Coastal Area	1919	1936	No. 10, 29 Groups and RAF Felixstowe	Coastal Command
Central Area	1933	1936	Bomber stations in Central England	
Inland Area	1920	1936	No. 1, 3, 7, 21, 22 & 23 Groups and No. 7 & 8 Wings	Training Command
North Eastern Area	1918	1919	No. 16 - 19 Groups	North-Western Area
North Western Area	1918	1919	No. 20 - 23 Groups	Northern Area
Northern Area	1919 1919	1919 1920	No. 16, 17, 18 & 20 Groups No. 3, 12 & 16 Groups	Disbanded Inland Area
South Eastern Area	1918	1919	No. 1, 2, 4 & 10 Groups	Southern Area
South Western Area	1918	1919	No. 7, 8, 9 & 10 Groups	No. 7 Group
Southern Area	1919	1920	No. 1, 2 & 7 Groups	Inland Area
Western Area	1933	1936		No. 3 (Bomber) Group
Allied Expeditionary Air Force	1943	1944	2nd TAF, ADGB, No. 38 & 82 Groups & USAAF 9th Air Force	RAF Element, Forward Supreme HQ Allied Expeditionary Air Forces

== Overseas commands ==
Command	Formation	Disbandment	Controlled	Became
British Forces Aden	April 1942	October 1959		British Forces Arabian Peninsula
British Forces Arabian Peninsula	October 1959	March 1961		Middle East Command
Air Command Far East	November 1946	June 1949		Far East Air Force
Air Command South East Asia	January 1944	November 1946		Air Command Far East
Advanced Air Striking Force	August 1939	June 1940		Disbanded
British Air Forces in France	January 1940	August 1940	All RAF units in France	Disbanded
Eastern Air Command	September 1942 December 1943	March 1943 June 1945	Formed on the basis of No. 333 (Special Operations) Group, November 1942 3rd TAF and Strategical Air Force	Absorbed by Northwest African Air Forces Disbanded
Far East Air Force	June 1949	November 1971	AHQ Hong Kong & No. 224 Group RAF	Disbanded
Iraq Command	October 1922	1938	All RAF units in Iraq	Disbanded
Mediterranean Air Command	February 1943	December 1943	Northwest African Air Forces, Northwest African Tactical Air Force, Northwest African Strategical Air Force, Northwest African Coastal Air Force, Northwest African Training Command, Northwest African Air Service Command, Northwest African Photo Reconnaissance Wing, Malta Air Command & Middle East Air Command	Rear HQ Mediterranean Allied Air Forces
Middle East Command	December 1941	August 1945	No. 201 and 205 Groups RAF	RAF Mediterranean and Middle East
RAF Bengal and Burma	December 1944	February 1945	AHQ Bengal, No. 221 and No. 224 Groups RAF	Disbanded
RAF Burma	February 1945	September 1945	No. 221, 222, 229, 231 and 232 Groups RAF	AHQ Burma
RAF Germany	January 1959	April 1993	All RAF units in Germany	No. 2 Group RAF
RAF Hong Kong	September 1945	May 1946		AHQ Hong Kong
RAF Iceland	July 1941	July 1945	All RAF units in Iceland	Disbanded
RAF India	May 1919 April 1922 November 1922	January 1921 August 1922 December 1938	All RAF units in India	Indian Group Disbanded HQ Air Forces in India
RAF Iraq	April 1922	October 1922	All RAF units in Iraq	Iraq Command
RAF Ireland	February 1922	February 1923	All RAF units In Ireland	Disbanded
RAF Mediterranean	April 1922	December 1941	All RAF units in the Mediterranean area	Disbanded into AHQ Malta
RAF Mediterranean and Middle East	February 1944 July 1945	March 1944 June 1949	All RAF units in the Mediterranean area	
Middle East Air Force	June 1949	March 1961	All RAF units in the Middle East	Near East Air Force
RAF Rhine	October 1919	June 1920	No. 12 Squadron RAF & 'Q' Unit RAF	Disbanded
Balkan Air Force	June 1944	July 1945	All RAF units in the Balkans	Disbanded
Mediterranean Allied Air Forces	December 1943	February 1944	All RAF units in the Mediterranean	Disbanded
Mediterranean Allied Coastal Air Force	January 1944	August 1945	All RAF Coastal units in the Mediterranean	
Mediterranean Allied Strategic Air Force	January 1944	August 1945	All RAF Strategic units in the Mediterranean	
Mediterranean Allied Tactical Air Force	January 1944	July 1945	All RAF Tactical units in the Mediterranean	
Mediterranean Coastal Air Force	January 1944 August 1945	February 1944 October 1945	All RAF Coastal units in the Mediterranean	Mediterranean Allied Coastal Air Force AHQ RAF Italy
Near East Air Force	March 1961	March 1976	All RAF units in the Eastern Mediterranean	Disbanded
Northwest African Coastal Air Force	February 1943	January 1944	All RAF Coastal units in the Mediterranean	Mediterranean Coastal Air Force
Northwest African Tactical Air Force	February 1943	January 1944	All RAF Tactical units in the Mediterranean	Mediterranean Allied Tactical Air Force
Northwest African Strategic Air Force	February 1943	January 1944	All RAF Strategic units in the Mediterranean	Mediterranean Allied Strategic Air Force
First Tactical Air Force	July 1943	June 1946	(Desert Air Force)	Advanced AHQ Italy
Second Tactical Air Force	November 1943 September 1951	July 1945 November 1959	No. 2, 83, 84 Groups RAF and No. 34R & 85 Wings RAF All RAF units in Germany	Merged RAF Germany
Third Tactical Air Force	December 1943	December 1944	No. 221 & 224 Groups RAF & Troop Carrier Command	Disbanded

== Air Headquarters ==
Command	Formation	Disbandment	Controlled	Became
AHQ Aden	14 October 1937	21 April 1942		H.Q. British Forces, Aden
AHQ Air Defences Eastern Mediterranean	4 March 1943	1 February 1944		Disbanded into AHQ Eastern Mediterranean
AHQ Austria	28 February 1946 28 February 1947	15 August 1946 1 November 1947		RAF Austria Commission Disbanded
AHQ Bengal	20 April 1942 1 August 1944	24 March 1943 4 December 1944		Bengal Command Disbanded into HQ RAF Bengal/Burma
AHQ Burma	20 September 1945	15 December 1947		Disbanded
AHQ Ceylon	16 October 1945	1 November 1957		Disbanded
AHQ Cyprus	9 January 1954 1 April 1976	15 December 1956 present		Disbanded into AHQ Levant Extant as of 2007
AHQ Dee Force	1 October 1942	1 May 1943		Disbanded
AHQ East Africa	25 July 1940 16 November 1942	15 December 1941 15 September 1951		Became No. 207 Group RAF Disbanded
AHQ Eastern Mediterranean	1 February 1944	28 February 1946		Disbanded into No. 219 Group RAF
AHQ Egypt	1 December 1941 31 August 1944	4 March 1943 28 February 1946		Became AHQ Air Defences Eastern Mediterranean Disbanded into No. 219 Group RAF
AHQ Far East	10 January 1941	15 February 1942		Disbanded
AHQ Gibraltar	21 December 1941	30 November 1966		Disbanded
AHQ Greece	1 September 1944	11 January 1947		Disbanded
AHQ Hong Kong	15 May 1946	24 March 1967		Disbanded into British Force Hong Kong
AHQ India	16 August 1939 8 March 1944	8 March 1944 15 August 1947		Disbanded
AHQ Iraq	January 1938 1 March 1946	1 January 1943 1 May 1955		Became AHQ Iraq and Persia Became AHQ Levant
AHQ Iraq and Persia	1 January 1943	1 March 1946		Became AHQ Iraq
AHQ Italy	1 October 1945	6 October 1947		Disbanded
AHQ Levant	1 December 1941 1 May 1955	26 July 1948 1 April 1958		Disbanded
AHQ Libya	20 January 1942	3 February 1942		Became AHQ Western Desert
AHQ Malaya	1 October 1945	31 August 1957		Became No. 224 Group RAF
AHQ Malta	December 1939	30 June 1968		Disbanded
AHQ Netherlands East Indies	1 October 1945	30 November 1946		Disbanded
AHQ Siam	1 October 1945	April 1946		Disbanded
AHQ Singapore	16 February 1953	1 January 1958		Disbanded
AHQ Supreme Commanders Headquarters	15 August 1947	1 December 1947		Disbanded
AHQ West Africa	23 September 1941	1 August 1946		Became No. 500 Wing RAF
AHQ Western Desert	21 October 1941 21 February 1943	3 February 1942 10 July 1943		Became AHQ Libya Became the Desert Air Force
AHQ 'X'	1 September 1944	15 October 1944		Became AHQ Greece

== See also ==
- Command (military formation)
- Royal Air Force
- British Armed Forces
