= Robert George (RAF officer) =

Governor of South Australia (1953–60)

Air Vice Marshal Sir Robert Allingham George KCMG, KCVO, KBE, CB, MC, KStJ
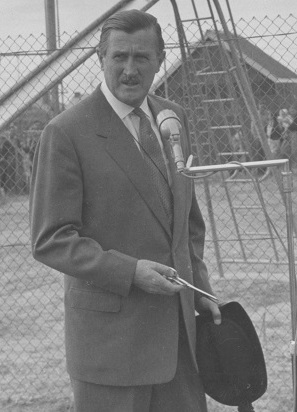
- George in 1956

24th Governor of South Australia
- In office 23 February 1953 – 7 March 1960
- Monarch: Elizabeth II
- Premier: Sir Thomas Playford
- Preceded by: Sir Willoughby Norrie
- Succeeded by: Sir Edric Bastyan

Personal details
- Born: 27 July 1896 Cromarty, Scotland
- Died: 13 September 1967 (aged 71) Marylebone, London

Military service
- Allegiance: United Kingdom
- Branch/service: British Army (1914–18); Royal Air Force (1918–52)
- Years of service: 1914–52
- Rank: Air Vice Marshal
- Commands: AHQ Iraq and Persia (1944–45); RAF Hawkinge (1937–39); No. 33 Squadron (1932–34); No. 100 Squadron (1930–31)
- Battles/wars: First World War; Second World War
- Awards: Knight Commander of the Order of St Michael and St George; Knight Commander of the Royal Victorian Order; Knight Commander of the Order of the British Empire; Companion of the Order of the Bath; Military Cross; Commander of the Royal Order of George I (Greece)

Air Vice Marshal Sir Robert Allingham George, KCMG, KCVO, KBE, CB, MC, KStJ (27 July 1896 – 13 September 1967) was a senior officer in the Royal Air Force and Governor of South Australia from 23 February 1953 until 7 March 1960. He was born in the County of Ross and Cromarty, Scotland, on 27 July 1896, and educated at Invergordon and Inverness. In May 1927, he married Sybil Elizabeth Baldwin.

== Military career ==
When the First World War began in 1914, George enlisted in the Seaforth Highlanders and was sent to France. He was transferred to the Royal Flying Corps and was awarded the Military Cross for his night bombing. In 1919 he was appointed to a permanent commission in the Royal Air Force. He was appointed Officer Commanding No. 100 Squadron in 1930 and Officer Commanding No. 33 Squadron in 1932.

George later served as Senior Air Staff Officer at Headquarters RAF Far East in Singapore from 1934 and as Station Commander at RAF Hawkinge from 1937. At the outbreak of the Second World War he was Air Attaché in Ankara. He went on to be Air Officer Commanding AHQ Iraq and Persia in 1944. After the War he served as Air Attaché in Paris until he retired in 1952.

He was appointed a Commander of the Order of the British Empire in 1944 and a Companion of the Order of the Bath in 1948, promoted to substantive air vice marshal in 1950 and knighted as a Knight Commander of the Order of the British Empire in 1952.

== Governor of South Australia ==
Sir Robert was appointed Governor of South Australia in August 1952. He and Lady George arrived in Adelaide early the following year. The Premier, Sir Thomas Playford, noted in his welcome address to Sir Robert that governors were expected to be "an inspiration in times of danger."

Playford's words turned out to be portentous – South Australia would suffer through earthquake, fire and flood in consecutive years during Sir Robert's tenure. In March 1954, the worst earthquake in Adelaide's history damaged Government House, along with many other buildings in the city. Less than a year later, the Governor's summer residence at Marble Hill was destroyed in the Black Sunday bushfires of January 1955. He and his wife and staff sheltered under wet blankets in the driveway, and were lucky to escape with their lives. In a particularly cruel twist of fate, all Sir Robert and Lady George's possessions were lost in the fire, having been relocated to Marble Hill while Government House was undergoing repairs for the damage suffered in the earthquake. Finally, the 1956 Murray River flood was the largest in recorded history. On 20 August, Sir Robert surveyed the flood-hit areas in a light aircraft, and said he was "appalled at the tremendous area underwater and the terrific damage which had resulted."

Sir Robert was a colourful governor, once demanding a personal helicopter from Premier Playford. Although admired for his bravery, Sir Robert was considered old-fashioned by the masses, particularly due to his impatience, polo-playing, and his habit of carrying a fly-whisk and a cane. Lady George was an ardent supporter of many charities, but her support for traditional family roles was not popular with the emerging feminists; once, while officiating at the opening of new laboratories at a girls' college, she claimed: "The most important thing for a girl is to learn how to run a home well."

Despite their frequent clashes, Playford supported George and the dignity of the Vice-Regal post in a 1956 court case regarding the cook's wages. The prosecuting lawyer was future Labor premier Don Dunstan. Playford negotiated an out-of-court settlement on condition that Dunstan and his Labor colleagues in the House would not debate the budget item. Labor maverick Samuel Lawn (the member for Adelaide) did not honour the agreement, and tried to raise a public scandal. Playford responded by extending George's term.

=== Freemasonry ===
George was appointed Grand Master of the Grand Lodge of South Australia in 1956.

== Retirement and death ==
George and his family retired to England in 1959 after which he held no further government appointments. He died in a London Hospital on 13 September 1967, after being hit by a motorist and not regaining consciousness.

Military offices
| Preceded by Robert Willock | Air Officer Commanding Air HQ Iraq and Persia; 1944–1945 | Succeeded by Stephen Strafford |
Government offices
| Preceded by Sir Willoughby Norrie | Governor of South Australia; 1953–1960 | Succeeded by Sir Edric Bastyan |
