= RAF Fighter Command =

Former command of the Royal Air Force

Fighter Command
- RAF Fighter Command badge
- Active: 14 July 1936–1968
- Country: United Kingdom
- Branch: Royal Air Force
- Garrison/HQ: RAF Bentley Priory
- Motto: Offence Defence
- March: Fighter Command March
- Engagements: World War II; Cold War

Commanders
- Notable commanders: Sir Hugh Dowding; Sir Sholto Douglas

Aircraft flown
- Fighter: Hawker Hurricane; Supermarine Spitfire; Gloster Meteor; Hawker Hunter; English Electric Lightning

RAF Fighter Command was one of the commands of the Royal Air Force. It was formed in 1936 to allow more specialised control of fighter aircraft. It operated throughout the Second World War, winning fame during the Battle of Britain in 1940. The command continued until November 1943, when it was disbanded and the RAF fighter force was split into two categories, defence and attack. The defensive force became Air Defence of Great Britain (ADGB) and the offensive force became the RAF Second Tactical Air Force. ADGB was renamed Fighter Command in October 1944 and continued to provide defensive patrols around Britain. It was disbanded for the second time in 1968, when it was subsumed by the new Strike Command.

== Origins ==
On 20 May 1926, the forerunner of Fighter Command was established as a group within Inland Area. On 1 June, Fighting Area was transferred to the Air Defence of Great Britain. Fighting Area was raised to command status in 1932 and renamed Fighter Command on 1 May 1936. On 23 February 1940, No. 60 Group RAF was established within Fighter Command to control Chain Home radar detection and tracking units.

== Second World War ==
=== Battle of Britain ===
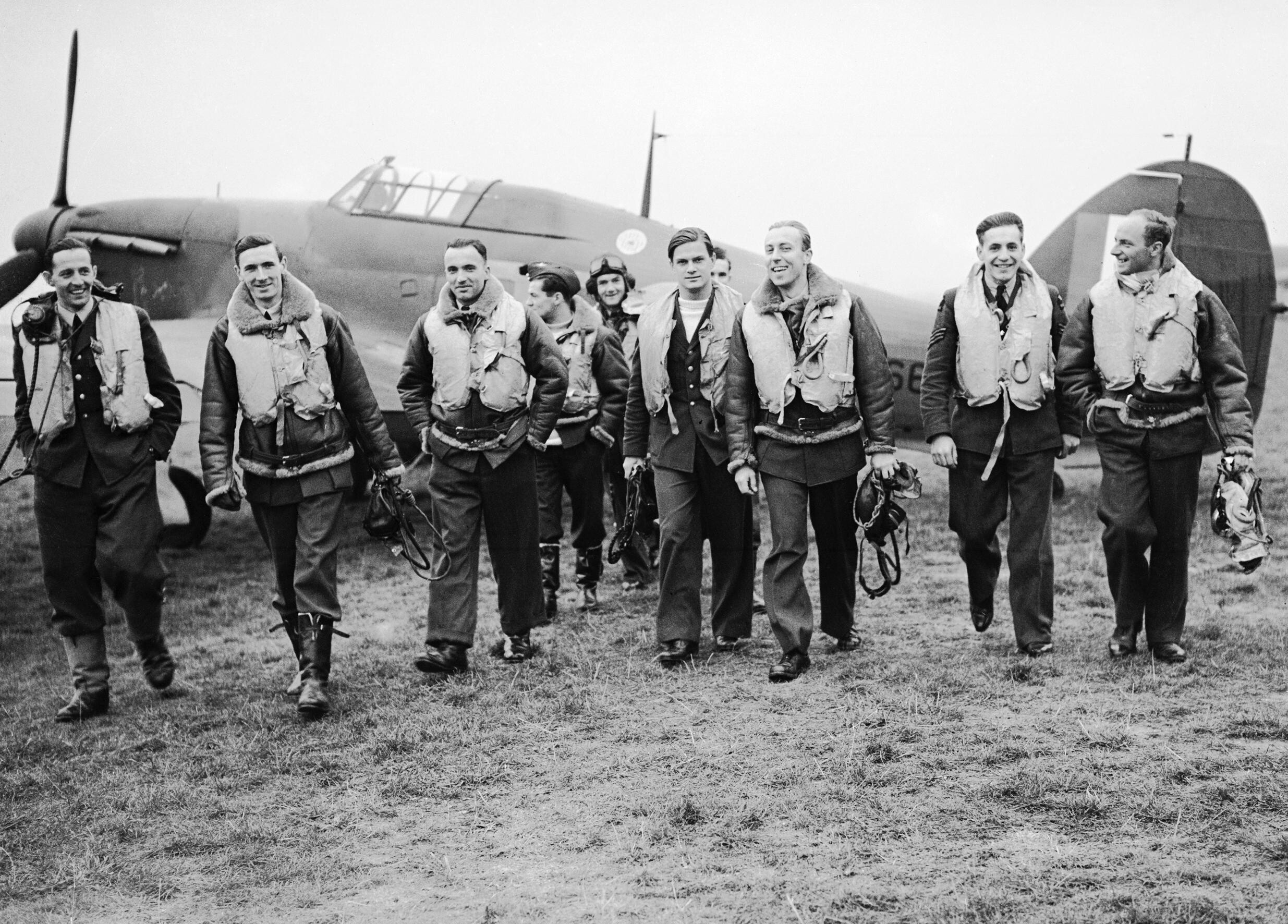
Shot of the fighter pilots of the Polish 303 Squadron, 1940. Foreign fighter squadrons began forming in July 1940.

During the late 1930s Fighter Command expanded greatly and replaced its obsolete biplane squadrons – generally outfitted with Bristol Bulldog, Gloster Gauntlet and Hawker Fury biplane fighters leading up to, and through the period of its founding – with the Hawker Hurricane and the Supermarine Spitfire. This period also saw the formation of groups within Fighter Command to control air defence in specific areas. 11 Group controlling southeast England and London was established in 1936; 12 Group, which covered the Midlands and East Anglia, in 1937, and 30 Group, administering barrage balloons, both in 1937; and 13 Group, which covered the North of England and Scotland, in March 1939. After the war began 10 Group, which covered southwest England, was established in June 1940, and in the farthermost north, 14 Group on 26 June 1940. 60 Group was established to run the Chain Home radar stations in February 1940.

Fighter Command was tested during the Battle of Britain in the summer of 1940 when the German Luftwaffe launched an offensive aimed at attaining air superiority over the Channel and the UK. After this, the Germans planned a seaborne invasion (codenamed Operation Sea Lion). In the end, the Germans failed to attain air superiority, although the RAF had been eating severely into its reserves during the battle, as had the Luftwaffe.

=== 1941 air offensive ===
By May 1941, the squadrons based at all the main fighter airfields operated in wings, under the tactical control of the new post of wing leader, a survivor of 1940 with the rank of wing commander. Fighter Command began a campaign to gain air superiority over northwestern France. Short-penetration fighter operations were used to draw the Luftwaffe into a war of attrition and keep as many German fighters in the west, particularly after the Operation Barbarossa, the German attack on the Soviet Union, began in June 1941. Large Spitfire formations were sent out with a few medium bombers to lure the German fighters into combat. The Luftwaffe left Jagdgeschwader 2 (JG 2) and Jagdgeschwader 26 (JG 26) in western Europe, comprising 180 fighters at most.

The advantages enjoyed by Fighter Command during the Battle of Britain were reversed, the short range of the Spitfire becoming a tactical disadvantage and British pilots became prisoners of war if shot down. Fighter Command claimed 711 Luftwaffe fighters shot down but only 236 were lost from all causes, 103 in combat, for a loss of 400 RAF fighters. As 1941 ended, the appearance of the new Focke-Wulf Fw 190, considerably superior to the Spitfire Mk V, put the British fighters at a worse disadvantage.

The Blitz of 1940 continued against civilian and industrial targets. Fighter Command night defences improved considerably in the new year; the Bristol Beaufighter supplanted the Bristol Blenheim as the principal night fighter, equipped with improved aircraft interception radar, and became increasingly effective in ground-controlled interception (GCI).

=== 1942–45 ===
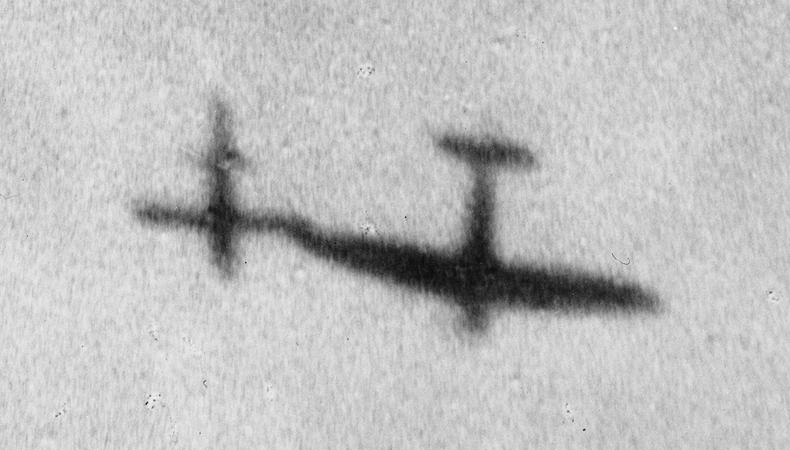
A Spitfire tipping the wing of a V-1, which disrupted the missile's automatic pilot during Operation Crossbow, 1944.

The difficult task of slowly grinding down the Germans continued into 1942 and 1943. Squadrons also found themselves on tiring defensive patrols as small formations of Fw 190s flew 'hit and run' nuisance raids along the south coast and the Hawker Typhoon came into squadron service. On 19 August, during the Dieppe Raid, the RAF had an opportunity to engage large numbers of Luftwaffe aircraft. The Spitfire squadrons (42 with Mark Vs, and four with Mark IXs) flew ground-attack, escort and air-superiority sorties and prevented the Luftwaffe from interfering in the ground and sea battle, claiming 106 victories. Postwar analysis showed that the RAF lost 106 aircraft, including 88 fighters and 18 bombers; 29 fighter losses were from flak, one ran out of fuel, two collided and one was a victim of friendly fire. The actual Luftwaffe loss was 48 aircraft, 28 being bombers, half of them Dornier Do 217s from KG 2. JG 2, lost 14 Fw 190s and eight pilots killed, JG 26 lost six Fw 190s with their pilots. Spitfire losses stood at 70 destroyed and damaged to all causes; the number lost to Fw 190s is unknown. The Luftwaffe claimed 61 of the 106 RAF machines lost, which included all types, JG 2 claiming 40 and JG 26 claiming 21. In 1942 Fighter Command claimed 560 victories against a true loss of 272 German fighters from all causes, for 574 RAF day fighters destroyed.

By the autumn of 1942, the arrival of the United States Army Air Forces (USAAF) 8th Air Force and its daylight bombers added bomber escort to Fighter Command's tasks. Until American Republic P-47 Thunderbolt fighter groups were operational in May 1943, the command's Spitfires performed a key role in protecting the increasing numbers of Boeing B-17 Flying Fortresses and Consolidated B-24 Liberators operating over Occupied Europe. The Spitfire's chronic lack of operational range – not unlike the Bf 109E's dilemma during the Battle of Britain – meant such protection was limited to the Channel and the European coast. The Spitfire had a range of only 479 miles (771 km).

In February 1944, Fighter Command was split into the Air Defence of Great Britain (ADGB), the former name of Fighter Command, to defend Britain, and the Second Tactical Air Force, to support ground forces after the invasion of Europe. On 15 July, No. 14 Group RAF (established 26 June 1940) was disestablished. In 1944 ADGB made the greatest effort in its history during Operation Overlord, the invasion of France which began on 6 June. RAF and Allied fighter units suppressed the meagre German air opposition and supported ground forces by strafing German positions and transport. Later that year, the final test of ADGB (renamed Fighter Command in October 1944) in the war occurred against the V-1 flying bomb during Operation Crossbow. RAF fighters also flew long-range night intruder operations against German airfields and aircraft (e.g. at take-off/landing) at the time the Luftwaffe night fighters would be scrambled against RAF Bomber Command (see Operation Hydra).

In January 1945, Fighter Command included 10, 11, 12 and 13 Groups, plus 38 (Airborne Forces) Group, 60 Group, and 70 (Training) Group. 10 Group was disestablished on 2 May 1945, and 70 Group on 17 July 1945. In 1946, 60 Group was amalgamated with 26 Group to become 90 (Signals) Group and transferred to Transport Command/British Air Force of Occupation. From 1939 to 1945, RAF Fighter Command lost 3,690 killed, 1,215 wounded and 601 POW; 4,790 aircraft were lost.

== Royal Observer Corps ==
As a direct result of its efforts during the Battle of Britain the Observer Corps was granted the title Royal by King George VI and became a uniformed volunteer branch of the RAF from April 1941 for the remainder of its existence as the Royal Observer Corps (ROC).

The corps continued as a civilian organisation but wearing a Royal Air Force uniform and administered by Fighter Command. With their headquarters at RAF Bentley Priory, the ROC remained administered by Fighter Command until 31 March 1968, when responsibility was handed over to the newly formed RAF Strike Command.

The ROC was a defence warning organisation operating in the UK between 1925 and 31 December 1995, when it was stood down. Initially established for an aircraft recognition and reporting role that lasted through both world wars, the organisation switched to a Cold War nuclear reporting role during the 1950s. The Royal Observer Corps consisted of some 10,500 volunteers.

== Cold War years ==
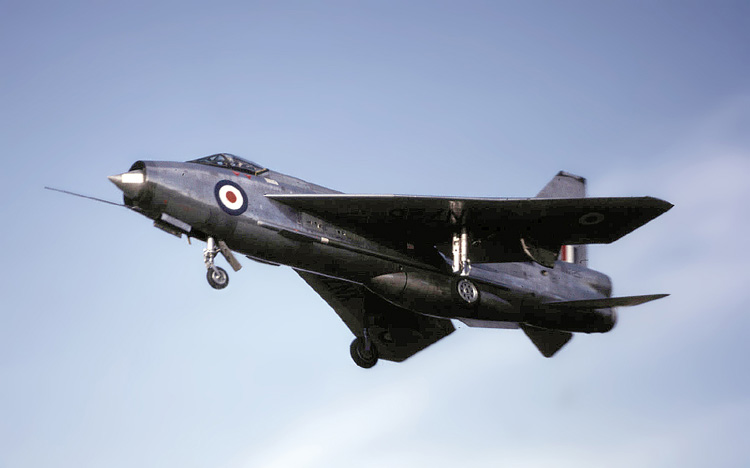
The supersonic fighter English Electric Lightning, a mainstay of Fighter Command during the Cold War years

In the aftermath of World War II, the role of Fighter Command was still to protect the UK from air attack. Only the threat had changed, from Germany to the Soviet Union. The Cold War saw the possibility of Soviet Air Forces bombers attacking the UK. A Canadian fighter wing, No. 1 Wing, arrived at RAF North Luffenham in late 1951 to bolster NATO's strength, and was in a position to assist Fighter Command until it relocated to bases in France and West Germany in 1954–55, as did US Air Force fighters under Fighter Command operational control (81st and 406th Fighter-Interceptor Wings). After 1949, those Soviet bombers could be carrying nuclear weapons, and so intercepting them was crucial if the UK was to be able to absorb damage and continue fighting in any NATO-Soviet war. A long succession of fighter aircraft saw service with Fighter Command during the 1950s and 1960s, including the Gloster Meteor, Hawker Hunter, Gloster Javelin and English Electric Lightning.

The Lightning was the only purely British supersonic aircraft to enter service, owing to a defence review in 1957. During the mid-1950s, the performance of the new surface-to-air missiles was improving quickly. Duncan Sandys, the Minister of Defence at the time, needed to find cuts in the British defence budget since the UK was in serious danger of being bankrupted by its defence spending. The rate of improvement of surface-to-air missiles seemed to indicate that they would soon be able to shoot down any manned aircraft. Consequently, in the 1957 Defence White Paper, the Sandys review declared that manned aircraft were obsolescent and would soon become obsolete. All programmes for manned aircraft that were not too far along were cancelled.

In 1961, RAF Fighter Command was assigned to NATO's air defence system. On 1 May, Air Officer Commanding in Chief, Fighter Command, Air Marshal Sir Hector McGregor, assumed the additional title of Commander United Kingdom Air Defence Region. The ADR itself stretched some hundreds of miles to the north, west and south of the country and almost to the continental coastline in the east.

In organisational terms, Nos 11 (14 July 1936 – 31 December 1960, 1 January 1961 - 1 April 1963) and 12 Groups (1 April 1937 – 31 March 1963) continued in almost unbroken service until 1963. No.13 Group (15 March 1939 – 20 May 1946) was reformed on 16 May 1955 and then disbanded 31 December 1961 at RAF Ouston (becoming 11 Group). From 1 April 1963 three sectors, No. 11 Sector RAF; No. 12 Sector RAF; and No. 13 Sector RAF were maintained. Appointed on 27 February 1965, Air Commodore Frederick John Manning (34118) was the last Air Officer i/c Administration at HQ Fighter Command. 13 Sector disbanded by amalgamation with No. 11 Sector on 17 March 1965.

=== Disbandment 1968 ===
As the 1960s dawned, the RAF continued to shrink. The three functional commands, Fighter Command, Bomber Command, and Coastal Command, had all been formed in 1936 to help reorganise an expanding RAF. It was now becoming clear that the RAF was becoming too small to justify their continued existence as separate entities. Consequently, in 1968, Fighter Command and Bomber Command were amalgamated to form Strike Command, and became groups within the new command. Coastal Command was disbanded and subsumed into Strike Command in November 1969.

== Air Officers Commanding-in-Chief ==
List of commanders
From	To	Name
14 July 1936	25 November 1940	Air Chief Marshal Sir Hugh Dowding
25 November 1940	28 November 1942	MRAF Sir Sholto Douglas
28 November 1942	15 November 1943	Air Chief Marshal Sir Trafford Leigh-Mallory
15 November 1943	14 May 1945	Air Chief Marshal Sir Roderic Hill
14 May 1945	17 November 1947	Air Chief Marshal Sir James Robb
17 November 1947	19 April 1949	Air Chief Marshal Sir William Elliot
19 April 1949	7 April 1953	Air Chief Marshal Sir Basil Embry
7 April 1953	1 January 1956	MRAF Sir Dermot Boyle
1 January 1956	8 August 1956	Air Chief Marshal Sir Hubert Patch
8 August 1956	30 July 1959	MRAF Sir Thomas Pike
30 July 1959	18 May 1962	Air Marshal Sir Hector McGregor
18 May 1962	3 March 1966	Air Marshal Sir Douglas Morris
3 March 1966	30 April 1968	Air Chief Marshal Sir Frederick Rosier

== See also ==
- List of Royal Air Force commands

Preceded by Fighting Area, Air Defence of Great Britain	Fighter Command; 1936–1968	Succeeded by Strike Command
