= Hector McGregor =

Royal Air Force Air Marshal (1910-1973)

Sir Hector McGregor
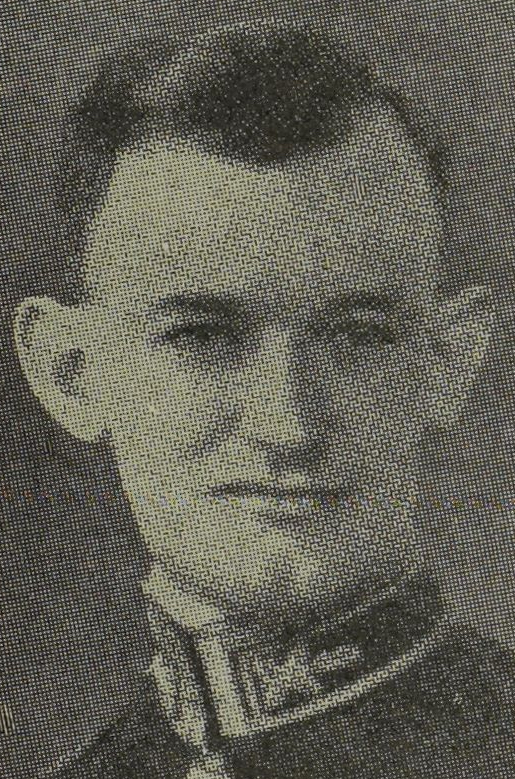
- Born: 15 February 1910; Wairoa, New Zealand
- Died: 11 April 1973 (aged 63)
- Military career
- Allegiance: United Kingdom
- Branch: Royal Air Force
- Service years: 1928–1964
- Rank: Air Marshal
- Commands: Far East Air Force (1962–1964); RAF Fighter Command (1959–1962); No. 2 Group (1951–1953); Air Headquarters Levant (1944–1946); Tangmere Sector (1942–1943); RAF Ballyhalbert (1941); No. 213 Squadron (1940); No. 33 Squadron (1938–1940)
- Conflicts: Arab revolt in Palestine; Second World War
- Awards: Knight Commander of the Order of the Bath; Commander of the Order of the British Empire; Distinguished Service Order; Mentioned in Despatches (7); Officer of the Legion of Merit (United States)

Air Marshal Sir Hector Douglas McGregor, KCB, CBE, DSO (15 February 1910 – 11 April 1973) was a senior Royal Air Force commander.

== RAF career ==
Born in New Zealand and educated at Napier Boys' High School, McGregor joined the Royal Air Force in 1928. He served as a pilot but in 1931 he attended the Aircraft Engineering Course and he subsequently undertook several engineering-related tours. He served before and during World War II as Officer Commanding No. 33 Squadron at Heliopolis in Egypt and on attachment at Lydda in Palestine, where he earned the Distinguished Service Order for his leadership during policing duties. He went on to be Officer Commanding No. 213 Squadron at RAF Biggin Hill in 1940, Station Commander at RAF Ballyhalbert in 1941 and then Senior Air Service Officer at No. 82 Group later the same year before being made Officer Commanding, Tangmere Sector in 1942. He became deputy director, Operations, Intelligence and Plans at Headquarters Mediterranean Air Command in 1943 and Air Officer Commanding Air Headquarters Levant in 1944.

After the War, he became Air Officer Commanding No. 2 Group in 1951 before being appointed Director of Guided Missile Development at the Ministry of Supply in 1953. He went on to be Assistant Controller, Aircraft at the Ministry of Supply in 1956, Chief of Staff (Air Defence) at Headquarters SHAPE in 1957 and Commander-in-Chief of Fighter Command in 1959. His last appointment was as Commander-in-Chief of the Far East Air Force in 1962 before he retired in 1964.

In retirement, McGregor became Chairman of the New Zealand News Consultative Board in 1964.

Military offices
Preceded by John Coleman	Air Officer Commanding Air Headquarters Levant; 1944–1946	Succeeded by Walter Dawson
Preceded by The Earl of Bandon	Air Officer Commanding No. 2 Group; 1951–1953	Succeeded by John Hallings-Pott
Preceded by Sir Thomas Pike	Commander-in-Chief Fighter Command; 1959–1962	Succeeded by Sir Douglas Morris
Preceded by Sir Anthony Selway	Commander-in-Chief Far East Air Force; 1962–1964	Succeeded by Sir Peter Wykeham
