= Douglas Morris =

Royal Air Force Air Marshal (1908-1990)

Sir Douglas Morris
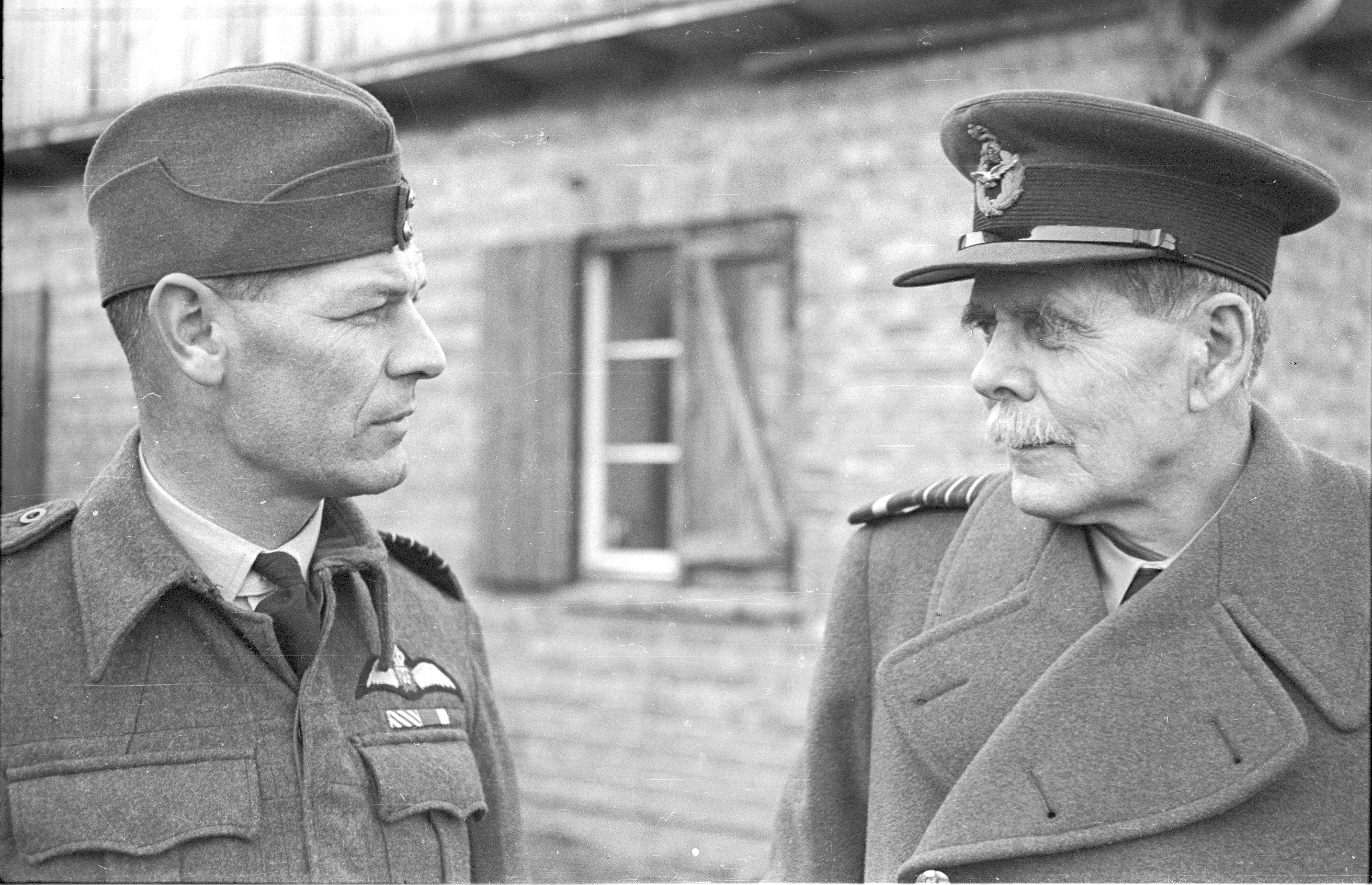
- Douglas Morris (left) and Hugh Trenchard, 1st Viscount Trenchard in Grimbergen, Belgium 1944.
- Born: 3 December 1908
- Died: 26 March 1990 (aged 81)
- Military career
- Allegiance: United Kingdom
- Branch: Royal Air Force
- Service years: 1930–66
- Rank: Air Marshal
- Commands: Fighter Command (1962–66); Metropolitan Sector (1952); Southern Sector (1950–52); No. 132 Wing (1944–45); RAF North Weald (1942–43); No. 406 Squadron (1941–42)
- Conflicts: Second World War
- Awards: Knight Commander of the Order of the Bath; Commander of the Order of the British Empire; Distinguished Service Order; Distinguished Flying Cross; Commander of the Order of St. Olav (Norway); Commander of the Order of Orange-Nassau (Netherlands)

Air Marshal Sir Douglas Griffith Morris, KCB, CBE, DSO, DFC (3 December 1908 – 26 March 1990) was a Royal Air Force officer who became Air Officer Commanding-in-Chief of Fighter Command.

== RAF career ==
Educated at St John's College in Johannesburg, Morris joined the Royal Air Force in 1930. He served in the Second World War as Officer Commanding No. 406 Squadron and then as Station Commander RAF North Weald before being appointed Officer Commanding No. 132 Wing and finishing the war as Senior Air Service Officer at Headquarters No. 84 Group.

He became Senior Air Service Officer at the Headquarters of the Second Tactical Air Force in 1955 and was then made Assistant Chief of the Air Staff (Air Defence) in 1957. He was appointed Chief of Staff at Headquarters Allied Air Forces Central Europe in 1960 and Air Officer Commanding-in-Chief of RAF Fighter Command in 1962 in which capacity he visited India and Aden before he retired in 1966.

In 1967 he carried out a review of the Air Training Corps recommending that it be re-organised on a regional basis.

Military offices
Preceded by Sir Hector McGregor	Commander-in-Chief Fighter Command; 1962–1966	Succeeded by Sir Frederick Rosier
