= Frederick Rosier =

Royal Air Force Air Chief Marshal (1915–1998)

Sir Frederick Rosier
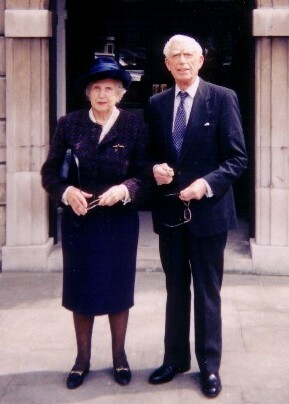
- Sir Frederick and Lady Rosier outside St Clement Danes (April 1995)
- Born: 13 October 1915; Wrexham, Wales
- Died: 10 September 1998 (aged 82); Llangollen, Wales
- Military career
- Allegiance: United Kingdom
- Branch: Royal Air Force
- Service years: 1935–73
- Rank: Air Chief Marshal
- Commands: Fighter Command (1966–68); Air Forces Middle East (1961–64); RAF Horsham St Faith (1947–48); RAF Northolt (1944); RAF Aston Down (1943–44); No. 263 Wing (1941–42); No. 229 Squadron (1940–41)
- Conflicts: Second World War: Battle of France; Battle of Britain; North African campaign
- Awards: Knight Grand Cross of the Order of the Bath; Commander of the Order of the British Empire; Distinguished Service Order; Mentioned in Despatches; Commander of the Order of Orange-Nassau (Netherlands); Order of Merit (Poland)

Air Chief Marshal Sir Frederick Rosier, GCB, CBE, DSO (13 October 1915 – 10 September 1998) was a senior Royal Air Force commander.

== Early and wartime career ==
Born in Wrexham on 13 October 1915, son of E. G. Rosier, a railway engine driver, Fred Rosier was educated at Grove Park School and played rugby for North Wales Schoolboys.

He received a Short Service Commission in the Royal Air Force in 1935 and served with No. 43 Squadron flying Hawker Fury aircraft at Tangmere from 1936 to 1939. He was a flight commander with No. 229 Squadron RAF (Hawker Hurricane aircraft) by May 1940, having helped form and convert the squadron from the Bristol Blenheim aircraft. He first saw active service during the Second World War in France where he commanded a detachment of No. 229 Squadron at Vitry-en-Artois near Arras and was shot down by a Messerschmitt Bf 109, receiving facial burns. Returning to active service by October 1940, he commanded 229 Squadron from RAF Northolt for the last 12 days of the Battle of Britain.

He embarked with No. 229 Squadron for North Africa on board HMS Furious and led the aircraft in a take-off from ship to North Africa via Malta. Promoted to wing commander in 1941, he took charge of No. 263 Wing, where he had joint operational control of the Desert Air Force's fighter squadrons. In November 1941 he spotted an Australian Tomahawk aircraft being forced down by enemy fighters and landed his single-seater to rescue the pilot. Having got Sergeant Burney aboard, he attempted to take off but suffered a burst tyre and crashed the aircraft. Both he and Burney walked across the desert for four days, avoiding large enemy patrols, to reach safety with a Guards unit.

Rosier became the deputy commander of No. 211 Group and was awarded the Distinguished Service Order for operations over Libya in 1941. Returning to the UK in 1943, he became simultaneously officer commanding No. 52 Operational Training Unit and RAF Aston Down. He was appointed an Officer of the Order of the British Empire mid that year, before being appointed to command RAF Northolt in 1944.

== Post-war ==
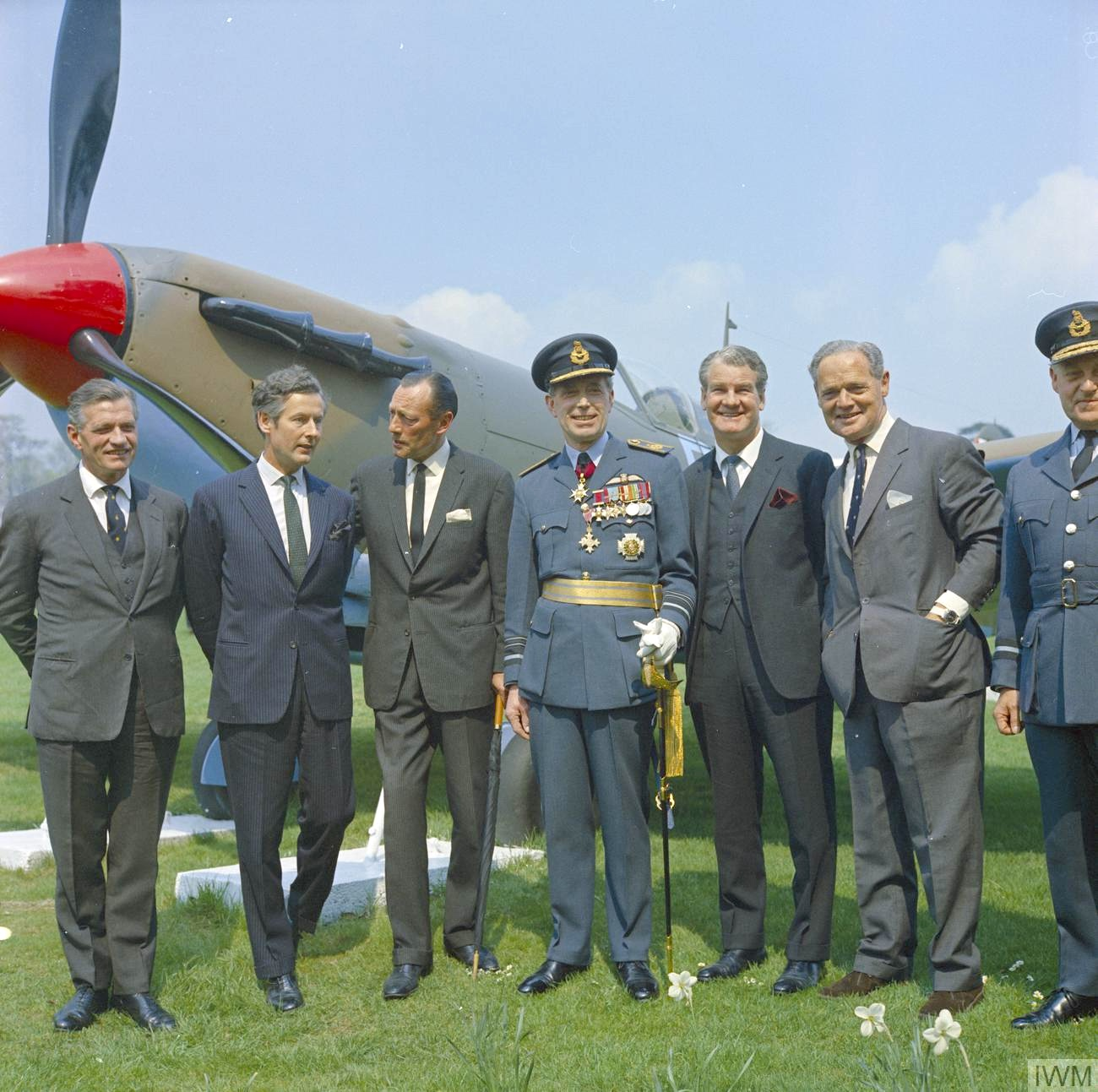
Rosier in 1968 with several World War II aces

He was appointed officer commanding RAF Horsham St Faith in 1947 and then went on an exchange officer posting with the United States Air Force in 1948 and on return to the UK was appointed an instructor at the Joint Services Staff College in 1950. He went on to be group captain operations at Central Fighter Establishment in 1952, group captain plans at RAF Fighter Command in 1954 and aide-de-camp to the Queen in 1956.

He was made director of joint plans at the Air Ministry in 1958, air officer commanding Air Forces Middle East in 1961 and senior air staff officer at Headquarters Transport Command in 1964. His last appointments were as air officer commanding-in-chief at RAF Fighter Command in 1966, as UK permanent military deputy at CENTRO in Ankara in 1968 and as deputy commander-in-chief Allied Air Forces Central Europe in 1970. Rosier was advanced to a Knight Grand Cross of the Order of the Bath in 1972, before he retired from the RAF the following year.

== Retirement ==
In retirement he became a military advisor and director of the Preston Division of the British Aircraft Corporation until 1977 when he was made director in charge of the Saudi Arabia part of the company. He was the chairman of the Polish Pilots Benevolent Fund and received the Polish Order of Merit in 1998.

For the last few years of his life he lived at Sun Bank, Trevor, near Llangollen.

== Family ==
Sir Fred married Hettie Denise Blackwell of Wrexham in 1939; they had three sons and one daughter.

Military offices
Preceded by Sir Douglas Morris	Commander-in-Chief Fighter Command; 1966–1968	Post disbanded
Preceded by Sir Augustus Walker	Deputy Commander-in-Chief Allied Forces Central Europe; 1970–1973	Succeeded by Sir Lewis Hodges
