= Robert Willock =

Royal Air Force Air Vice-Marshal (1893-1973)

- Born: 17 December 1893
- Died: 22 March 1973 (aged 79)
- Military career
- Allegiance: United Kingdom
- Branch: British Army (1914–1918); Royal Air Force (1918–1946)
- Service years: 1914–1946
- Rank: Air Vice-Marshal
- Commands: AHQ Iraq and Persia (1943–1944); No. 21 (Training) Group (1940–1943); RAF Kenley (1928–1930); No. 4 Armoured Car Company (1922–1924); No. 57 Training Squadron (1917–1919)
- Conflicts: First World War; Second World War
- Awards: Companion of the Order of the Bath; Commander's Cross with Star of the Order of Polonia Resituta (Poland); Commander of the Legion of Merit (United States)

Air Vice-Marshal Robert Peel Willock, CB (17 December 1893 – 22 March 1973) was a senior Royal Air Force officer who commanded the British Air Forces in Iraq during the Second World War.

== RAF career ==
Willcock was commissioned into the 9th (Reserve) Battalion of the Oxford and Buckinghamshire Light Infantry in 1914 and went on to serve as a Squadron Commander with the Royal Flying Corps during the First World War. Following his promotion to wing commander in 1928, he was appointed Station Commander at RAF Kenley in 1928 before going on to be Air Attaché in Shanghai in 1933 and Director of Staff Duties at the Air Ministry in 1938. He served in the Second World War as Air Officer Commanding No. 21 (Training) Group. He became Air Officer Commanding AHQ Iraq and Persia in 1943 and then became Head of the RAF delegation in Washington D. C. in 1944 before retiring in 1945.

In retirement, he was the Civil Aviation Adviser to the UK High Commissioner to Australia.

Military offices
Preceded by Hugh Champion de Crespigny	Air Officer Commanding AHQ Iraq and Persia; 1943–1944	Succeeded by Robert George
