= Stephen Strafford =

RNAS pilot and RAF officer

Stephen Charles Strafford
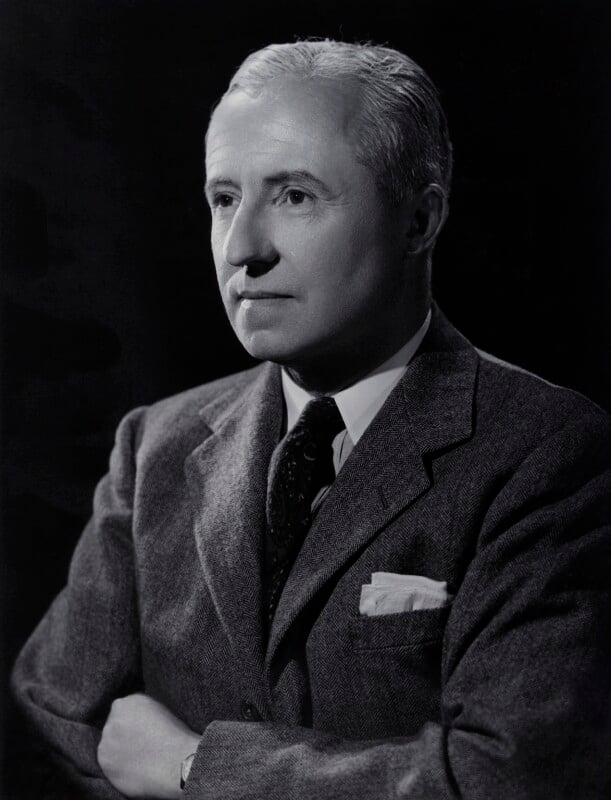
- Strafford in 1948
- Born: 21 November 1898; Cirencester, Gloucestershire
- Died: 18 May 1966 (aged 67); Aylesbury, Buckinghamshire
- Military career
- Allegiance: United Kingdom
- Branch: Royal Navy (1917–18); Royal Air Force (1918–54)
- Service years: 1917–54
- Rank: Air Marshal
- Commands: Inspector-General of the RAF (1952–54); RAF Regiment (1950–52); Air HQ Iraq and Persia (1945–47)
- Conflicts: First World War; Second World War
- Awards: Companion of the Order of the Bath; Commander of the Order of the British Empire; Distinguished Flying Cross; Mentioned in Despatches (3); Bronze Medal of Military Valor (Italy); Legion of Honour (France); Croix de guerre (France)

Air Marshal Stephen Charles Strafford, CB, CBE, DFC (21 November 1898 – 18 May 1966) was a pilot in the Royal Naval Air Service during the First World War and a senior officer in the Royal Air Force during the Second World War and the following years.

== RAF career ==
Strafford was commissioned into the Royal Naval Air Service in 1917 during the First World War. He was promoted to flight lieutenant in 1924. In 1930 he became a Flight Commander with No. 6 Squadron. He served in the Second World War as Officer Commanding the Advanced Headquarters (North) of the British Air Forces in France before becoming deputy director of Plans at the Air Ministry in 1940. He was made Head British Air Planner for the Combined Chiefs of Staff in Washington D. C. in 1941, before joining the staff of the Chief of Staff to the Supreme Allied Commander (COSSAC) in 1943 and becoming Chief of Plans and Operations for Supreme Headquarters Allied Expeditionary Force in 1944. After serving as the Air Officer Administration at Middle East Command, Strafford was appointed Air Officer Commanding Air HQ Iraq and Persia in July 1945.

After the War he became Senior Air Staff Officer at Headquarters RAF Bomber Command before becoming Commandant-General of the RAF Regiment in 1950 and Inspector-General of the RAF in 1952. Strafford was one of the representatives of the RAF at the funeral of King George VI. He retired in 1954.

Military offices
Preceded by Robert George	Air Officer Commanding Air HQ Iraq and Persia; Air HQ Iraq from 1946; 1945–1947	Succeeded by Alexander Gray
Preceded by Harold Lydford	Commandant-General of the RAF Regiment; 1950–1952	Succeeded by Sir Francis Mellersh
Preceded by Sir Thomas Williams	Inspector-General of the RAF; 1952–1954	Succeeded by Sir Charles Guest
