= Hugh Champion de Crespigny =

Royal Air Force Air Vice-Marshal (1897–1969)

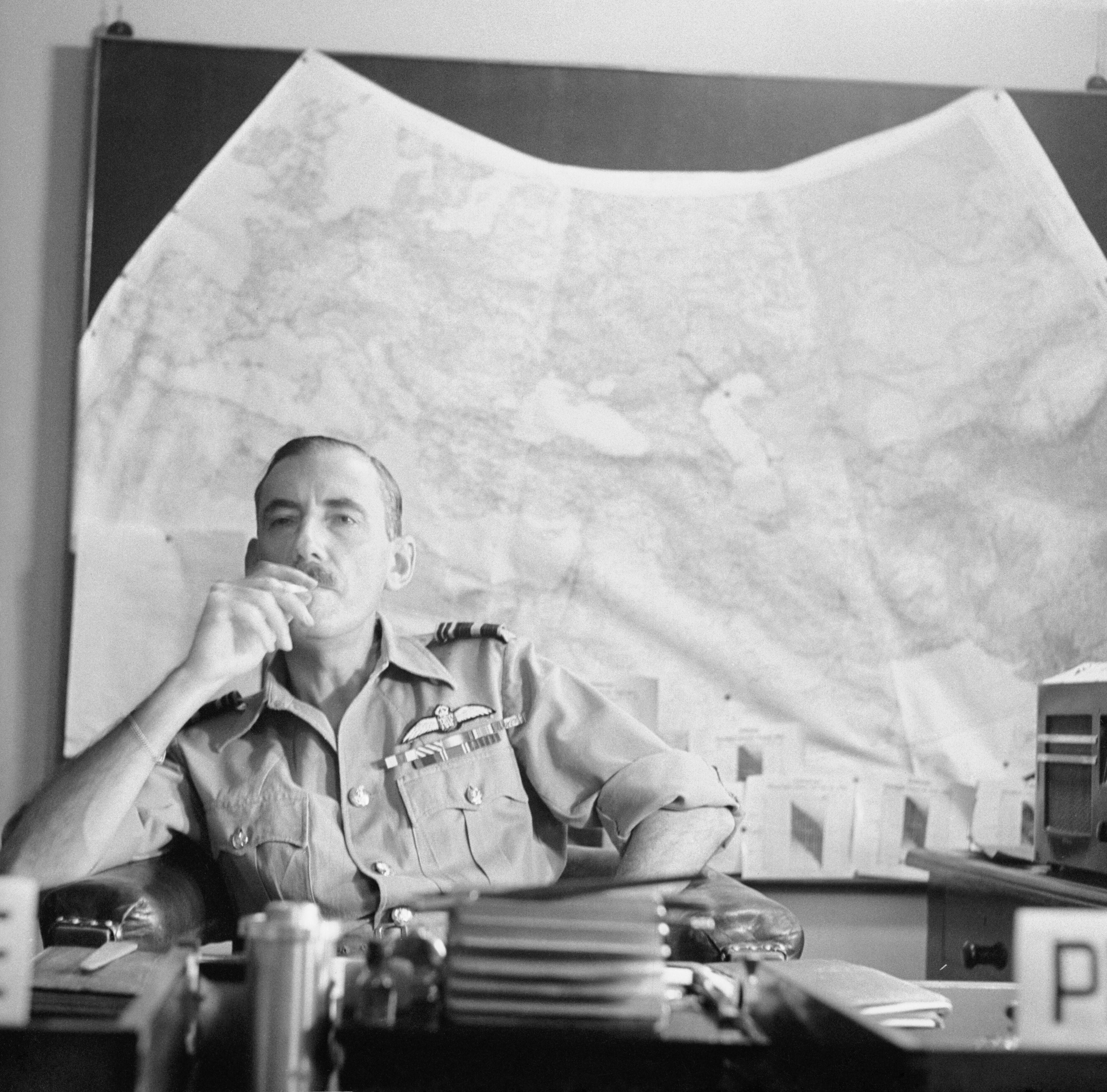
- Air Vice Marshal Hugh Champion de Crespigny c.1943
- Born: 8 April 1897; Elsternwick, Australia
- Died: 20 June 1969 (aged 72)
- Military career
- Allegiance: United Kingdom
- Branch: British Army (1914–18); Royal Air Force (1918–45)
- Service years: 1915–1945
- Rank: Air Vice Marshal
- Commands: No. 21 (Training) Group (1943–45); AHQ Iraq (1942–43); No. 25 (Armament) Group (1939–42); No. 8 Flying Training School (1936–39); No. 2 (Indian) Wing (1930–34); No. 39 Squadron (1925–30); No. 60 Squadron (1922–24); No. 65 Squadron (1918); No. 29 Squadron (1917)
- Conflicts: First World War; Second World War
- Awards: Companion of the Order of the Bath; Military Cross; Distinguished Flying Cross; Mentioned in Despatches; Croix de guerre (France)

Air Vice Marshal Hugh Vivian Champion de Crespigny, CB, MC, DFC (8 April 1897 – 20 June 1969), often referred to as Vivian Champion de Crespigny, was a Royal Flying Corps pilot who fought in France during the First World War, and senior Royal Air Force officer who commanded British Air Forces in Persia and Iraq during the Second World War.

== Early years ==
De Crespigny was born in Brighton, Victoria, the fourth son of Philip Champion de Crespigny (4 January 1850 – 11 March 1927), manager of the Bank of Victoria in Melbourne, and Philip's second wife Sophia Montgomery Grattan née Beggs (1870–1936). He was educated at Brighton Grammar School. In August 1914, following the outbreak of the First World War, he enlisted with the 7th Battalion of the Australian Army as a private. In 1915 he was recommended for a commission in the Suffolk Regiment, and from there graduated to the Royal Flying Corps' special reserve.

== RAF career ==
De Crespigny joined the Special Reserve of the Royal Flying Corps in 1915. He went on to be Officer Commanding No. 29 Squadron on the Western Front and then Officer Commanding No. 65 Squadron also on the Western Front. Apart from three months' sick leave, he was at the front in France continuously from June 1915, and was promoted Major in April 1917. After the war he went to India where he commanded No. 60 Squadron and then No. 39 Squadron and finally No. 2 (Indian) Wing.

He served in the Second World War as Air Officer Commanding No. 25 (Armament) Group, as Air Officer Commanding Air Headquarters Iraq and then as Air Officer Commanding No. 21 (Training) Group.

In 1945 De Crespigny joined the (British) Labour Party, and stood as their candidate for the British Parliament in Newark, but was narrowly beaten by the sitting Conservative member, Lt-Col. Sidney Shephard. He was a leader in the campaign to fly great numbers of children from the devastated regions of Germany to England before the winter of 1945, when it was predicted millions of homeless would die from the cold.

De Crespigny retired from the RAF in 1945. and was appointed Regional Commissioner for Schleswig-Holstein for the Control Commission for Germany one of four civilians appointed to oversee the de-Nazification of Germany and Austria. He oversaw relief efforts for the area, much of the population being in a pitiable condition, exacerbated by mass migration from East Germany, and with rising incidence of tuberculosis.

In 1948 De Crespigny was succeeded as commissioner by William Asbury and stayed in Kiel as British consul until 1956. He later lived at Vierville in Natal, South Africa. He died at Pietermaritzburg, Natal, South Africa.

== Recognition ==
- De Crespigny was awarded the Military Cross in May 1916.

2nd Lt. (temp. Capt.) Hugh Vivian Champion de Crespigny, Suff. R. and R.F.C. For conspicuous gallantry and skill, notably when he attacked five enemy machines over the enemy's lines. He drove away one, and brought another to the ground badly hit. His own machine was then crippled by the fire of the remaining three, but, after emptying one more drum at them, he brought his machine down safely in our lines.

- Citation for the award of the Distinguished Flying Cross in the London Gazette – 3 December 1918

Maj. Hugh Vivian Champion de Crespigny, M.C. (Suff. R.). (FRANCE). A brilliant and gallant officer who displays high initiative in night flying, in which service his example has been invaluable to those under his command. On the night of 23rd-24th. September Major Champion de Crespigny carried out a long distance bombing raid. Flying a machine unsuitable for night duty, and in face of adverse weather conditions, he reached, and successfully bombed, his objective. A fine performance, calling for cool courage and determination.

- He was invested as a Companion of the Order of the Bath (CB) in the 1943 New Year Honours for his service with the RAF during the Second World War.

== Family ==
De Crespigny married Sylvia Ethel Usher in Fovant, Wiltshire, on 7 October 1926. They had four sons:

- Robert Vivian Champion de Crespigny (12 October 1927 – 14 December 1929)
- Hugh Philip Champion de Crespigny (1928 – 24 April 2004)
- Anthony Richard Champion de Crespigny (26 September 1930 – 15 November 2008)
- Julian Augustus Claude Champion de Crespigny (1934–1974)

His brother was Air Commodore Claude Champion de Crespigny.

Military offices
Preceded by John D'Albiac; As AOC British Forces in Iraq	Air Officer Commanding AHQ Iraq; AHQ Iraq & Persia from January 1943; February 1942 – October 1943	Succeeded by Robert Willock
