= Alexander Gray (RAF officer) =

Royal Air Force air marshal

- Born: 8 September 1896
- Died: 16 May 1980 (aged 83)
- Military career
- Allegiance: United Kingdom
- Branch: British Army (1914–1918); Royal Air Force (1918–1949)
- Service years: 1914–1949
- Rank: Air Vice Marshal
- Commands: AHQ Iraq (1947–1949); No. 224 Group (1943–1944); No. 223 (Composite) Group (1942–1943); RAF Manston (1939–1940); No. 7 Squadron (1934–1935); No. 12 Squadron (1923–1926); No. 55 Squadron (1917–1918)
- Conflicts: First World War; Second World War
- Awards: Companion of the Order of the Bath; Military Cross; Mentioned in Despatches (2); Croix de guerre (France); Distinguished Flying Cross (United States)

Air Vice Marshal Alexander Gray, CB, MC (8 September 1896 – 16 May 1980) was a senior Royal Air Force leader during the Second World War.

== RAF career ==
Gray was commissioned into the 7th Battalion of the Princess Louise's (Argyll and Sutherland Highlanders) in 1915 having briefly served as a private soldier in the Highland Light Infantry in the early days of the First World War. He was appointed Officer Commanding No. 55 Squadron in December 1917. He went on to command No. 12 Squadron from 1923 and No. 7 Squadron from 1934 before becoming deputy director of Training at the Air Ministry in 1936.

During the Second World War he was Station Commander at RAF Manston becoming a group captain at the headquarters of No. 9 Group in 1940. He continued his war service as Air Officer Commanding No. 223 (Composite) Group from 1942, Air Officer Commanding No. 224 Group from 1943 and Air Commander at Eastern Air Command from 1944. From February 1945 he was Director of Training at the Air Ministry. He was awarded the United States Distinguished Flying Cross for his service in the Second World War.

After the war he served as Air Officer Commanding AHQ Iraq before retiring in 1949.

Military offices
Preceded by Stephen Strafford	Air Officer Commanding Air HQ Iraq; 1947–1949	Unknown
