= AHQ Iraq =

Command of the British Royal Air Force (1941–1955)

Air Headquarters Iraq (1941–1943) Air Headquarters Iraq and Persia (1943–1946) Air Headquarters Iraq (1946–1955)
- Active: 1941–1955
- Country: United Kingdom
- Branch: Royal Air Force
- Headquarters: RAF Habbaniya (1941–43, 1946–55)

AHQ Iraq (Air Headquarters Iraq or Air H.Q. Iraq) was a command of the Royal Air Force (RAF).

== History ==
The command was formed on 1 November 1941 by renaming HQ British Forces in Iraq, the former RAF Iraq Command. AHQ Iraq was renamed AHQ Iraq and Persia on 1 January 1943. AHQ Iraq and Persia was a sub-command of Middle East Command which at the time was a sub-command of the Allied Mediterranean Air Command. AHQ Iraq was reformed by renaming AHQ Iraq and Persia on 1 March 1946. The Headquarters (A.H.Q.) were situated in RAF Habbaniya.

No. 6 Squadron RAF flew out from the Suez Canal Zone to Shaibah on 17 June 1951, during a period of high tensions with Iran - the Abadan crisis over oil nationalisation. On 18 December 1951 a detachment of No. 683 Squadron, long-range photo-reconnaissance, flying Lancasters and a Valetta, appears to have arrived from Kabrit/Khormaksar (Jefford 1988, 105; Lee, FFME, 94) From July 1952, the squadron moved between Habbaniya, Abu Sueir, May 1952 back to Nicosia, 11 July 1952 back to Habbaniya, finally leaving Habbaniya on 12 December 1955 (Jefford 1988, 26). In September 1952 the station at Amman in Jordan was placed under AHQ Iraq, with No. 19 Wing RAF Regiment located there. By that date the AOC was responsible for Amman, Aquabah, and Mafraq in Jordan; Habbaniya, Baghdad, Basrah, Mosul, Shaibah, and Ser Amadia in Iraq; Sharjah and Bahrain lower down the Gulf; and Mauripur in Pakistan (Lee FFME 94-95). No. 185 Squadron arrived at Habbaniya on 13 October 1952 to form a two-squadron FGA Vampire wing with 6 Squadron (Lee FFME 96; Jefford 1988, 66). 185 Squadron was then disbanded after only seven months, but 73 Squadron replaced it, transferring in from Takali, circa 1 May 1953. For the second time, both squadrons at Habbaniya were commanded by officers named Roberts!! (Lee FFME 96-98). On 30 November 1953 No. 683 Squadron was disbanded at Habbaniya.

In April 1955 a new agreement was made with the Iraq Government for the defence of Iraq and the use of bases by the RAF, after the Anglo-Iraqi Treaty had been somewhat superseded by the Baghdad Pact. The result was AHQ Iraq was disbanded by being renamed AHQ Levant on 1 May 1955. The handover ceremony took place at Habbaniya on 2 May 1955 (Lee FFME 103) and the RAF personnel remaining at Habbaniya, Basrah, and Shaibah were to known henceforth not as stations but 'RAF Unit, Habbaniya' etc. 73 Squadron, at Armaments Practice Camp at Nicosia, remained there, having spent 23 months at Habbaniya; 2 Field Squadron RAF Regiment moved to Cyprus under the command of AHQ Cyprus; and 21 Independent LAA Squadron RAF Regiment was disbanded (Lee FFME 103-104). The stations at Bahrain and Sharjah, along with the staging post at Mauripur were transferred to the control of HQ British Forces Aden.

On 14 January 1955 No 32 Squadron arrived from Kabrit to Shaibah (Jefford 1988, 36) replacing 73 Squadron and with 6 Squadron maintaining two Venom squadrons in Iraq. 32 Squadron returned west to Takali in Malta in October, after only ten months in Iraq. No. 128 Wing was disbanded on at Habbaniya on 31 October 1955 (Lee FFME 105), and during the same month the civil cantonments at Habbaniya, Shaibah, and Basrah were handed over to the Iraqi authorities. On 1 December 1955 AHQ Levant started to transfer from RAF Habbaniya to Cyprus and, on 15 January 1956 when the move was complete, AHQ Cyprus and AHQ Levant were amalgamated as AHQ Levant. No. 6 Squadron remained past the departure of the merging AHQ, only leaving Habbaniya on 6 April 1956.

One of the two main stations in Iraq, RAF Shaibah, was handed over to Iraqi control on 1 March 1956. Past this point, under the auspices of the Baghdad Pact, the RAF retained staging posts at Habbaniya and Basra; two signals units; and a skeleton maintenance unit at Habbaniya, to victual the flow of aircraft on their way to the Far East (Lee FFME 106).

The RAF maintained a presence in Iraq until mid-1959; all personnel were withdrawn from Habbaniya on 31 May, and those from Basra on 8 June (Lee FFME 106). The long-present Iraq Levies had already been disbanded in May 1955.

== Order of battle ==
Some of the units and commanders assigned to these commands for four different dates during World War II are illustrated below.

AHQ Iraq and Persia Order of Battle
AHQ Iraq 27 October 1942	AHQ Iraq and Persia 10 July 1943
No. 215 Group: No. 244 Squadron, Blenheim, Vincent, & Catalina	No. 215 Group: No. 208 Squadron Det., Hurricane No. 244 Squadron, Blenheim No. 1415 Flight (Met.), Gladiator
No. 214 Group: No. 237 (Rhodesia) Squadron Hurricane	

Notes
Det.=Detachment, Met.=Meteorological
On 10 July 1943, when the Allies invaded Sicily (Operation Husky), it's not clear whether Air Vice Marshal Hugh Champion de Crespigny or Air Vice Marshal Robert Willock was in command of AHQ Iraq and Persia.

== Commanders ==
Commanders included:

=== AHQ Iraq ===
- Air Vice Marshal John Maitland Salmond 1 October 2022
- Air Vice Marshal John Frederick Andrews Higgins 7 January 1924
- Air Vice Marshal Edward Leonard Ellington 19 November 1926
- Air Vice Marshal Henry Robert Moore Brooke-Popham 20 November 1928
- Air Vice Marshal Edgar Rainey Ludlow-Hewitt 18 October 1930
- Air Vice Marshal Charles Stuart Burnett 3 December 1932
- Air Vice Marshal William Gore Sutherland Mitchell 31 December 1934
- Air Vice Marshal Christopher Lloyd Courtney 12 February 1937
- Air Vice Marshal Harry George Smart 1939 to May 1941
- Air Vice Marshal John D'Albiac May 1941
- 1942 Air Vice Marshal Hugh Champion de Crespigny (19 February 1942)

=== AHQ Iraq & Persia ===
- 1943 Air Vice Marshal H V Champion de Crespigny (1 January 1943)
- 1943 Air Vice Marshal R P Willock
- 1944 Air Vice Marshal R A George
- 1945 Air Vice Marshal S C Strafford

=== AHQ Iraq ===
- 1946 Air Vice Marshal S C Strafford
- 1947 Air Vice Marshal A Gray
- 2 Sep 1950 - 1 Oct 1952 Air Vice Marshal George Beamish (AOC, AHQ Iraq)
- 20 Aug 1952 - Oct 1954 Air Vice Marshal John Gosset Hawtrey (died in San Remo on 26 Oct 1954 returning overland from Iraq)
- Oct 1954 - Apr 1956 Air Vice Marshal Hugh Hamilton Brookes
