= RAF area commands =

The RAF area commands were the major geographical operational and administrative formations of the Royal Air Force between 1918 and 1936 when they were replaced by functional commands.

== List of area commands ==
=== Numbered area commands ===
The use of numbered area commands was very short-lived, lasting only from April to May 1918 when all the numbered area commands were renamed according to the geographical area of responsibility.

- No. 1 Area, headquartered at the Covent Garden Hotel, London. Formed 1 April 1918. Renamed on 8 May 1918 as South-Eastern Area.
- No. 2 Area, headquartered at Chafyn Grove, Salisbury School, Wiltshire. Formed 1 April 1918. Renamed on 8 May 1918 as South-Western Area.
- No. 3 Area, headquartered in Birmingham, formed 29 Apr 1918. Renamed on 8 May 1918 as Midland Area.
- No. 4 Area, headquartered at the Racecourse Buildings, York. Formed 1 April 1918. Renamed on 8 May 1918 as North-Eastern Area.
- No. 5 Area, headquartered at the Adelphi Hotel, Glasgow. Formed 1 April 1918. Renamed 8 May 1918 as North-Western Area.

=== Geographically named area commands ===
- South-Eastern Area, headquartered at the Covent Garden Hotel until April 1919 and then Hillingdon, House, Uxbridge, London. Formed 8 May 1918 by renaming No. 1 Area. Renamed on 20 September 1919 as Southern Area.
- South-Western Area, headquartered at Chafyn Grove, Salisbury School, Wiltshire. Formed 8 May 1918 by renaming No. 2 Area. Downgraded on 20 September 1919 to No. 7 Group within Southern Area.
- Midland Area, headquartered at Somerset House, Clarendon Place, Leamington Spa. Formed 8 May 1918 by renaming No. 3 Area. Absorbed on 18 October 1919 into Northern Area.
