= AHQ Levant =

- Country: United Kingdom
- Branch: Royal Air Force

Air Headquarters Levant (AHQ Levant) was a command of the British Royal Air Force (RAF) established on 1 December 1941, by renaming the command known as H.Q. RAF Palestine and Transjordan. It controlled RAF units in the Mandate of Palestine and in the Emirate of Transjordan. Prior to being disbanded on 27 July 1948, Air H.Q. Levant was a sub-command of RAF Middle East Command and its successors. RAF Middle East Command became a sub-command of the Mediterranean Air Command in February 1943.

An AHQ Levant was reformed on 1 May 1955 when AHQ Iraq was renamed AHQ Levant as an interim measure following a new agreement with the Iraq Government for the defence of Iraq and use by the RAF of bases in Iraq. On 1 December 1955 AHQ Levant started to transfer from RAF Habbaniya to Cyprus (probably RAF Nicosia) and on 15 January 1956, when the move was complete, AHQ Cyprus and AHQ Levant were amalgamated as AHQ Levant. AHQ Levant was disbanded, 1 Apr 1958.

== Orders of battle (1941-1945) ==
H.Q RAF Palestine and Transjordan 11 November 1941

Air Commodore Leslie Brown

- No. 259 Wing
- No. 263 Wing

Air H.Q. Levant 27 October 1942

Group Capt Herbert Mermagen

- No. 1438 Flight, Bristol Blenheims
- No. 1413 Flight (Met.), Gloster Gladiators
- No. 2 Photographic Reconnaissance Unit RAF (Detachment), Hawker Hurricanes
- No. 213 Group
- No. 241 Wing
  - No. 451 Squadron RAAF, Hurricane

Air H.Q. Levant 10 July 1943

A/Cdre Bernard McEntegart

- No. 208 Squadron, Hurricane
- No. 1413 Flight (Meteorological), Gladiator

Air H.Q. Levant June, 1944

Air Commodore John Coleman

Air H.Q. Levant January, 1945

Air Commodore Hector McGregor (RNZAF)

Reformation of Air H.Q. Levant 1 May 1955

- 1 May 1955 - April 1956, on renaming of A.H.Q. Iraq, A.V.M. Hugh Hamilton Brookes

Met.= Meteorological Det.=Detachment;RAAF=Royal Australian Air Force.
