= 1914 in Australia =

- Decades: 1890s; 1900s; 1910s; 1920s; 1930s
- See also: 1914 in Australian literature; Other events of 1914; Federal election; Timeline of Australian history

1914 in Australia
- Monarch: George V
- Governor-General: Thomas Denman, 3rd Baron Denman; Ronald Munro Ferguson
- Prime minister: Joseph Cook; Andrew Fisher
- Population: 4,948,990
- Elections: Federal, Victoria, Western Australia

1914 in Australia was dominated by the outbreak of World War I. Andrew Fisher, who became Prime Minister a month after Australia entered the war vowed that Australia would "stand beside our own to help and defend Britain to the last man and the last shilling." In 1914, the Australian war effort was dominated by recruiting and equipping a force to fight overseas.

The southern winter rainfall zone of the continent suffered its worst rainfall failure until 1982. This led to record low wheat yields and exacerbated the problems caused by outbreak of World War I.

== Incumbents ==
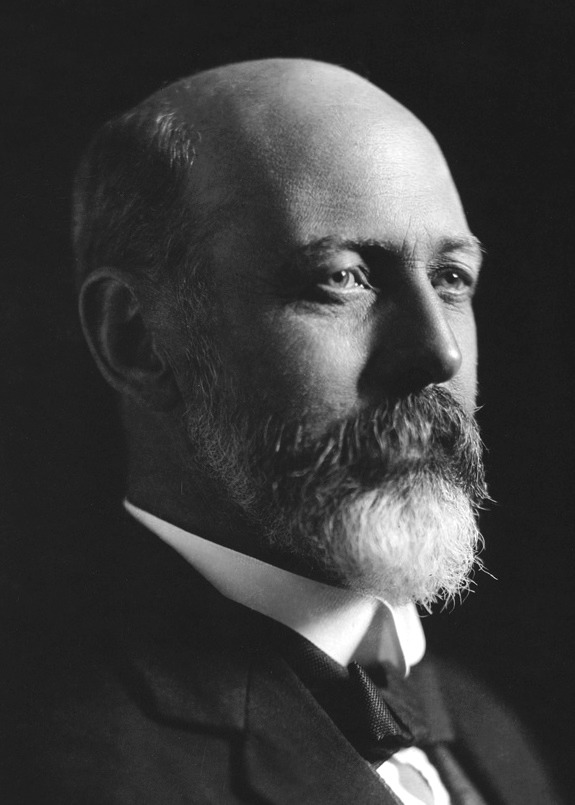
Joseph Cook

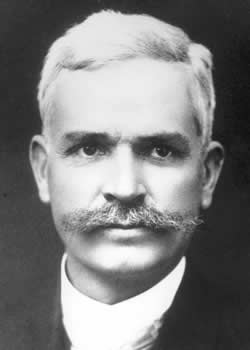
Andrew Fisher

- Monarch – George V
- Governor-General – Thomas Denman, 3rd Baron Denman (until 18 May), then Ronald Munro Ferguson
- Prime Minister – Joseph Cook (until 17 September), then Andrew Fisher
- Chief Justice – Samuel Griffith

=== State premiers ===
- Premier of New South Wales – William Holman
- Premier of Victoria – William Alexander Watt (until 18 June), then Alexander Peacock
- Premier of Queensland – Digby Denham
- Premier of South Australia – Archibald Peake
- Premier of Western Australia – John Scaddan
- Premier of Tasmania – Albert Solomon (until 6 April), then John Earle

=== State governors ===
- Governor of New South Wales – Gerald Strickland
- Governor of Victoria – Sir John Fuller, 1st Baronet (until 31 January), then Arthur Stanley (from 23 February)
- Governor of Queensland – William MacGregor
- Governor of South Australia – Day Bosanquet (until 22 March), then Henry Galway (from 18 April)
- Governor of Western Australia – Harry Barron
- Governor of Tasmania – William Ellison-Macartney

== Events ==
- 27 January – Thomas Denman resigns as Governor-General.
- 9 February – Ronald Munro Ferguson, a landholder and provost of Kirkcaldy appointed as the new Governor-General.
- 16 February – Charles Heydon of the New South Wales Industrial Court finds that a "living wage" for a family of four would be 48 shillings a week but more than a living wage should be paid. His recommendation was a minimum wage of 8s 6d for unskilled workers and 9s for heavy work.
- 1 March – The first military aircraft in Australia are flown.
- 18 May – Sir Ronald Munro Ferguson commences duties as Governor-General.
- 8 June – Joseph Cook persuades Ferguson to hold Australia's first double dissolution election after the Government Preference Bill prohibiting preference to unionists in Australian Government employment was twice rejected by the Senate of Australia.
- 16 July – Maurice Guillaux leaves Melbourne to fly to Sydney in a Blériot monoplane in the first delivery of airmail. He arrived in Sydney on 18 July after nine and a half hours of flying time.
- 31 July – As the likelihood of Britain being involved in a European war became more likely, the leaders of both major parties pledge their support. Opposition Leader Andrew Fisher states in a speech at Colac, Victoria Australians will stand beside her own to help and defend her to our last man and our last shilling. Prime Minister Joseph Cook states in Horsham, Victoria "All of our resources in Australia are ... for the preservation and the security of the empire".
- 4 August – The United Kingdom declares war on Germany – as a consequence Australia enters the war.
- 5 August – Australia fires its first shot in World War I at Fort Nepean in Victoria. The German merchant ship Pfalz was leaving Port Phillip Bay at 12.10 a.m. when news of involvement in the war had just reached the fort. The battery fired shots across its bows forcing the ship to surrender. This is believed to be the first shots fired in anger by British Empire forces during the war.
- 10 August – Recruiting begins for the First Australian Imperial Force. Australia had offered a force of 20,000 troops.
- 18 August – The Australian Naval and Military Expeditionary Force of 1500 men leaves Sydney to capture German New Guinea.
- 5 September – The Australian Labor Party led by Andrew Fisher wins the Federal election of 1914 winning 42 out of 75 seats in the Australian House of Representatives and 31 out of 36 seats in the Australian Senate.
- 9 September – The light cruiser HMAS Melbourne captures the German radio station in Nauru.
- 11 September – Australian troops land in German New Guinea.
- 13 September – Rabaul occupied.
- 14 September – The Australian submarine HMAS AE1 lost with all 35 men while patrolling New Britain.
- 17 September
  - The acting governor of German New Guinea surrenders.
  - Andrew Fisher becomes prime minister for the third time.
- 29 October – The War Precautions Act 1914, which gave the Government of Australia special powers for the duration of World War I and for six months afterwards, was passed by the Parliament of Australia.
- 1 November – The first contingent of the First Australian Imperial Force leaves for Egypt.
- 6 November – Australian forces occupy Nauru.
- 9 November – Australia's first naval victory as HMAS Sydney defeats SMS Emden in the Battle of Cocos.
- 30 November – The first aviation unit to leave for active service is sent to New Guinea.
- 21 December – Lieutenant-General Sir William Birdwood arrives in Egypt to take command of the Australian and New Zealand Army Corps.

== Arts and literature ==
- 4 September – William Henry Strahan published "The Bugle Call"

== Sport ==
- 6 April – Hawthorn joins the Victorian Football Association.
- During the 1914 Great Britain Lions tour of Australia and New Zealand the British win the Third and deciding Ashes Test.
- The 1914 NSWRFL Premiership is won by South Sydney
- 3 October – Port Adelaide defeats Carlton to be crowned Champions of Australia for a record fourth time and become the only SAFA/SAFL/SANFL to go through its entire season undefeated and untied.
- 3 November – The VRC Melbourne Cup was won by Kingsburgh (trained by Isaac 'Ike' Foulsham and ridden by George Meddick, owned by LKS Mackinnon). The trophy for this year's race was the last one to be made in England.

== Births ==
- 2 January – Jack Beaton (died 1996), rugby league player
- 11 February – Clyde Cameron (died 2008), politician
- 14 February – Norman Von Nida (died 2007), golfer
- 14 March – Robert Royce (died 2008), botanist
- 20 March – Tom Derrick (died 1945), soldier and Victoria Cross recipient
- 26 March – Ray Robinson (died 1965), cricketer
- 28 March – Kenneth Richard Norris (died 1983), entomologist
- 24 April – Moi-Yo Miller, assistant to magician Dante (died 2018)
- 4 April – David W. Goodall, botanist and ecologist (died 2018)
- 6 April – Gordon Stone (died 2015), rugby union player
- 10 April – Jack Badcock (died 1982), cricketer
- 7 May – Scobie Breasley (died 2006), jockey
- 21 May – Rhodes Fairbridge (died 2006), geologist
- 3 June – Sydney Edward Wright (died 1966), academic, pacifist, pharmacist, pharmacy college head and teacher
- 30 June – Bill Monti (died 1977), rugby union player
- 9 July – Mac Wilson (died 2017), Australian rules footballer
- 1 August – Hughie Edwards (died 1982), pilot, Victoria Cross recipient and Governor of Western Australia
- 3 August – Gordon Bryant (died 1991), politician
- 6 August – Gordon Freeth (died 1994), politician
- 18 August – Arthur Tange (died 2001), public servant
- 7 September – Graeme Bell (died 2012), jazz pianist, composer and band leader
- 9 September – John Passmore (died 2004), philosopher
- 24 September – John Kerr (died 1991), 18th Governor-General of Australia
- 25 September – Ted Humphries (died 1994), NSW politician
- 4 October – Jim Cairns (died 2003), politician
- 20 October – Fred Chaney (died 2001), politician
- 7 November – Geoffrey Blackburn, (died 2014), Baptist minister
- 8 November – Eileen Kramer (died 2024), dancer
- 8 December – Ernie Toshack (died 2003), cricketer
- 16 December – Jo Gullett (died 1999), soldier and politician
- 21 December – Frank Fenner (died 2010), virologist
- 29 December – Albert Tucker (died 1999), artist

== Deaths ==
- 11 March – John Mackay, explorer, sailor and harbourmaster (born in the United Kingdom) (b. 1839)
- 23 April – Alexander Robert Edgar, Methodist missionary (born in Ireland) (b. 1850)
- 23 June – Sir John Stokell Dodds, 5th Chief Justice of Tasmania (born in the United Kingdom) (b. 1848)
- 17 July – William Piguenit, artist (b. 1836)
- 7 August – Bransby Cooper, cricketer (born in India) (b. 1844)
- 9 August – Pharez Phillips, Victorian politician (died in the United Kingdom) (b. 1855)
- 13 August – Gregor McGregor, South Australian politician and trade union leader (born in the United Kingdom) (b. 1848)
- 24 August – Normand MacLaurin, New South Wales politician, physician and university administrator (born in the United Kingdom) (b. 1835)
- 4 September – William Ramsay, shoe polish manufacturer (born in the United Kingdom) (b. 1868)
- 5 October – Albert Solomon, 23rd Premier of Tasmania (b. 1876)
- 13 October – Walter Withers, artist (born in the United Kingdom) (b. 1854)
- 25 October – Jim Martin, soldier and youngest Australian military casualty in World War 1 (died in the Ottoman Empire) (b. 1901)
- 24 November – James Macfarlane, Tasmanian politician (born in the United Kingdom) (b. 1844)
- 9 December – John Arthur, Victorian politician (b. 1875)

== See also ==
- List of Australian films of the 1910s
