= 1916 in Australia =

- Decades: 1890s; 1900s; 1910s; 1920s; 1930s
- See also: 1916 in Australian literature; Other events of 1916; Timeline of Australian history

The following lists events that happened during 1916 in Australia.

1916 in Australia
- Monarch: George V
- Governor-General: Ronald Munro-Ferguson
- Prime minister: Billy Hughes
- Population: 4,943,173
- Elections: Tasmania

== Incumbents ==
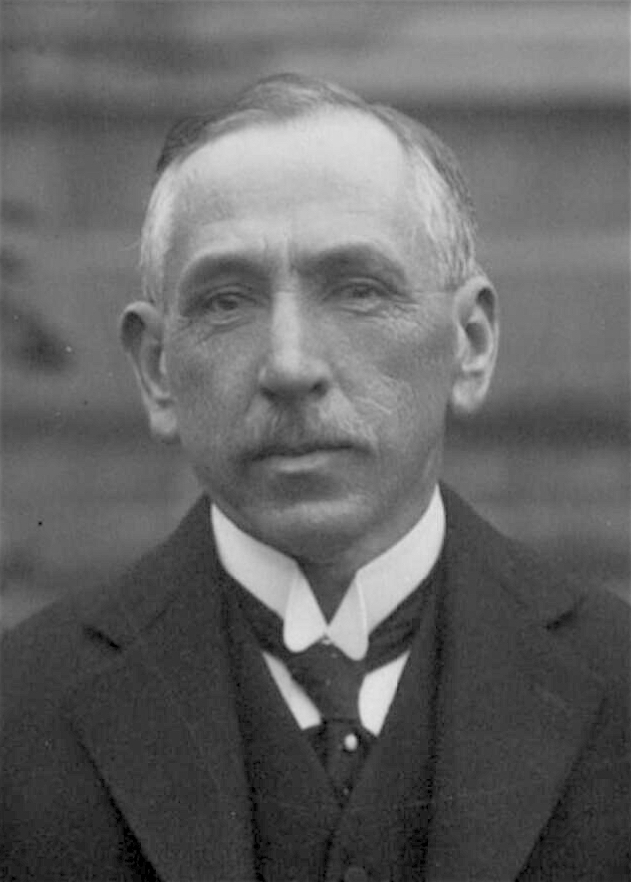
Billy Hughes

- Monarch – George V
- Governor-General – The Right Hon. Sir Ronald Munro-Ferguson
- Prime Minister – Billy Hughes
- Chief Justice – Samuel Griffith

=== State premiers ===
- Premier of New South Wales – William Holman
- Premier of Queensland – T. J. Ryan
- Premier of South Australia – Crawford Vaughan
- Premier of Tasmania – John Earle (until 15 April), then Walter Lee
- Premier of Western Australia – John Scaddan (until 27 July), then Frank Wilson
- Premier of Victoria – Sir Alexander Peacock

=== State governors ===
- Governor of New South Wales – Sir Gerald Strickland
- Governor of Queensland – Major Sir Hamilton Goold-Adams
- Governor of South Australia – Lieutenant Colonel Sir Henry Galway
- Governor of Tasmania – Sir William Ellison-Macartney
- Governor of Western Australia – Major-General Sir Harry Barron
- Governor of Victoria – Sir Arthur Stanley

== Events ==
- Hotels are forced to close at 6 p.m., leading to the beginning of the "six o'clock swill": 27 March in South Australia; 21 July in Sydney after referendum of 10 June; 11 October in Victoria; during March in Tasmania.
- 14 February – Liverpool riot of 1916 – troops mutinied against conditions at the Casula Camp. They raided hotels in Liverpool before travelling by train to Sydney, where one soldier was shot dead in a riot at Central Railway station.
- 6 June – The Returned Sailors' and Soldiers' Imperial League of Australia, the forerunner to the Returned and Services League is founded.
- 26 June – William Jackson awarded the Victoria Cross for his actions in a raid near Armentières, France.
- 1 to 30 June – Adelaide receives 217.9 millimetres (8.58 in) of rain, its highest monthly rainfall since records began in 1839.
- 19 July – Battle of Fromelles commenced; over the next seven weeks 22 826 Australian casualties occurred.
- 23 July – Arthur Seaforth Blackburn and John Leak awarded the Victoria Cross for their actions (separate) at the Battle of Pozières.
- 25 July – Thomas Cooke died in the Battle of Pozières and was awarded the Victoria Cross for his gallantry in the face of the enemy.
- 29 July – Claude Charles Castleton killed in the Battle of Pozières and for his actions in bringing back wounded men before and at the time of his death, he was awarded the Victoria Cross.
- Between 9 August and 12 August – Martin O'Meara repeatedly went out and brought in wounded officers and men from "No Man's Land" under intense artillery and machine-gun fire during the Battle of Pozières; for his gallantry he was awarded the Victoria Cross.
- 30 August – Rescue of the 22 men Imperial Trans-Antarctic Expedition who remained on Elephant Island.
- 28 October – The first plebiscite on the issue of military conscription was held; it was defeated.
- 1 November – a general coal strike began in eastern Australia.
- The Labor government under Billy Hughes splits over military conscription.
- 13 November – Prime Minister of Australia Billy Hughes is expelled from the Labor Party over his support for conscription.
- 2 December – Sydney Twelve: 12 members of the Industrial Workers of the World (IWW or the Wobblies) convicted in Sydney of conspiring to commit arson and sedition.
- 23 December – World War I: Battle of Magdhaba – In the Sinai desert, Australian and New Zealand mounted troops capture the Turkish garrison.
- 28 December – Floods in Clermont, Queensland claimed more than 60 lives.
- Undated – An unknown number of Indigenous Australians, could be as many as 300 to 400, are murdered at Geegully Creek, near Mowla Bluff, in the Kimberley region of Western Australia in an incident known as the Mowla Bluff massacre. Following the beating of a white station manager by Indigenous men, an armed mob which included officials and residents rounded up a large number of Aboriginal men, women and children who were then shot and had their bodies burned.
- Melbourne, with 967.5 millimetres (38.09 in) and Hobart with 1,104.2 millimetres (43.47 in), each receive their highest annual rainfall due to a strong La Niña.

== Arts and literature ==
- 6 March – The Sydney conservatorium of music accepts first students.

== Sport ==
- Sasanof wins the Melbourne Cup.
- The Sheffield Shield was not contested due to the war.
- 26 July – The 1916 NSWRFL season culminates in a grand final victory to Balmain, who defeated South Sydney 5–3.

== Births ==
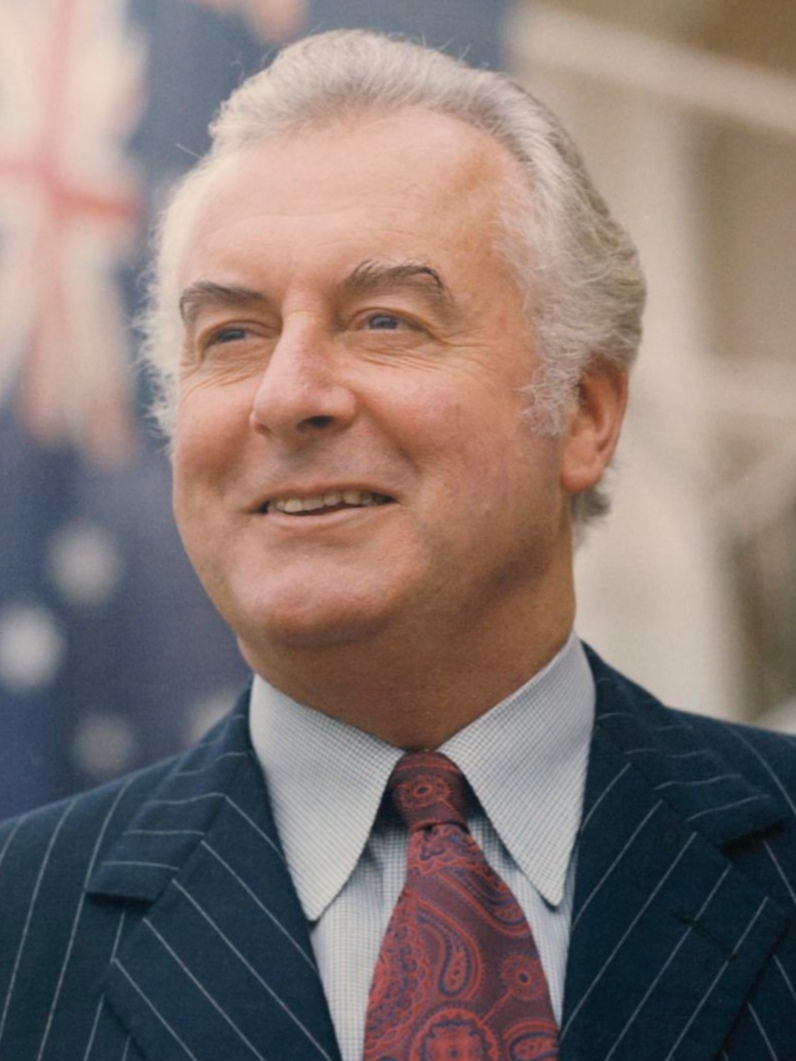
Gough Whitlam

- 28 February – Frank Crean, 5th Deputy Prime Minister of Australia (d. 2008)
- 14 April – Don Willesee, Western Australian politician (d. 2003)
- 26 April – Morris West, novelist and playwright (d. 1999)
- 2 July – Alec Hill, military historian (d. 2008)
- 11 July – Gough Whitlam, 21st Prime Minister of Australia (d. 2014)
- 29 July – Sir Rupert Hamer, 39th Premier of Victoria (d. 2004)
- 27 August – Sir James Ramsay, 20th Governor of Queensland (d. 1986)
- 11 September – Warren Bonython, conservationist and chemical engineer (d. 2012)
- 14 September – John Heyer, documentary filmmaker (d. 2001)
- 25 September – Jessica Anderson, novelist (d. 2010)
- 27 September – Beatrice Bligh, gardener (d. 1973)

== Deaths ==
- 19 May – William Sawers, New South Wales politician (born in the United Kingdom) (b. 1844)
- 13 August – Sir George Turner, 18th Premier of Victoria (b. 1851)
- 7 November – Henry Brockman, Western Australian politician (b. 1845)

== See also ==
- List of Australian films of the 1910s
