= 1912 in Australia =

- Decades: 1890s; 1900s; 1910s; 1920s; 1930s
- See also: 1912 in Australian literature; Other events of 1912; Timeline of Australian history

The following lists events that happened during 1912 in Australia.

1912 in Australia
- Monarch: George V
- Governor-General: Thomas Denman, 3rd Baron Denman
- Prime minister: Andrew Fisher
- Population: 4,653,721
- Elections: South Australia, Victoria, Western Australia

== Incumbents ==
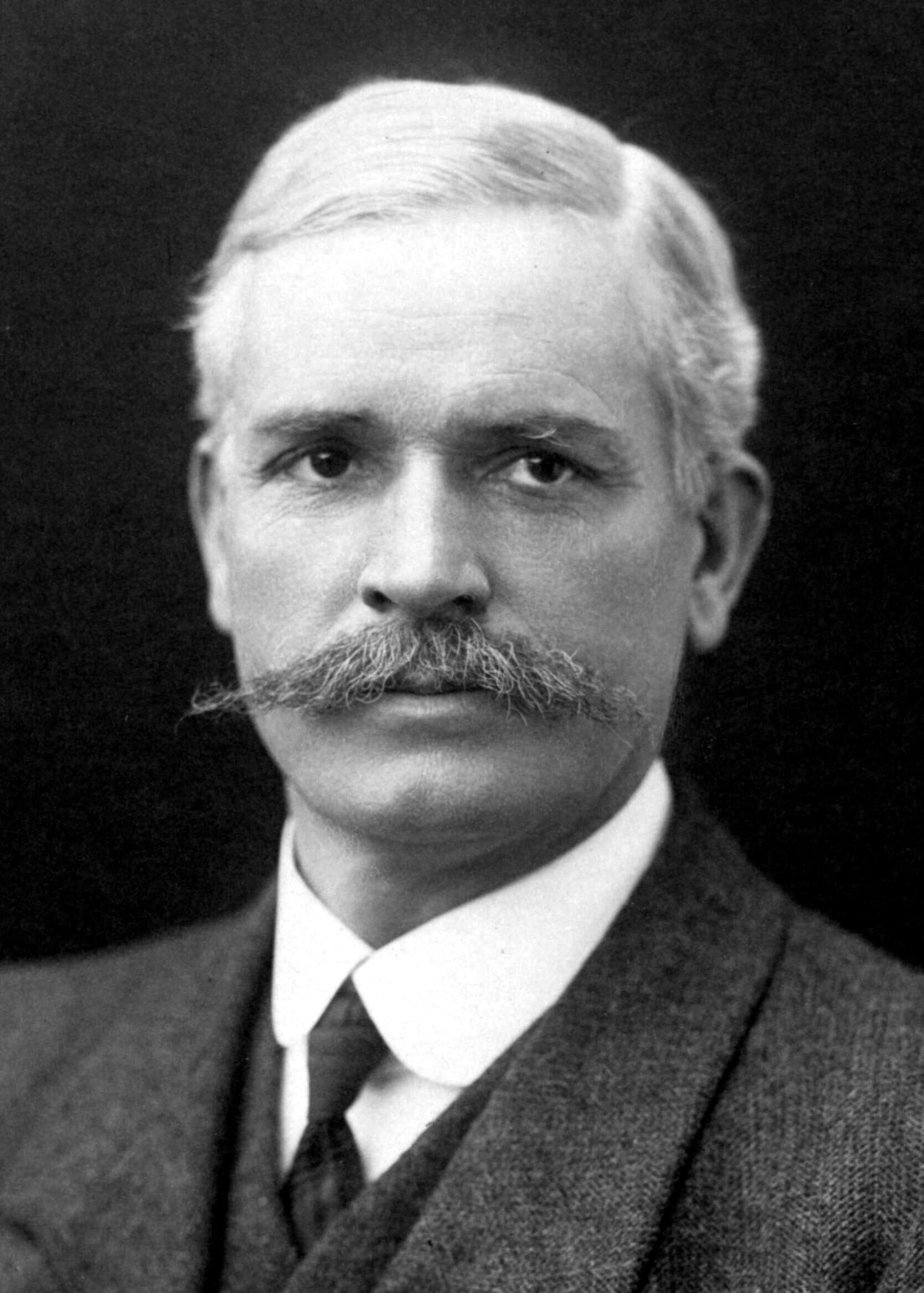
Andrew Fisher

- Monarch – George V
- Governor-General – The Right Hon. Thomas Denman, 3rd Baron Denman
- Prime Minister – Andrew Fisher
- Chief Justice – Samuel Griffith

=== State premiers ===
- Premier of New South Wales – James McGowen
- Premier of Queensland – Digby Denham
- Premier of South Australia – John Verran (until 17 February), then Archibald Peake
- Premier of Tasmania – Elliott Lewis (until 14 June), then Albert Solomon
- Premier of Victoria – John Murray (until 18 May), then William Watt
- Premier of Western Australia – John Scaddan

=== State governors ===
- Governor of New South Wales – Frederic Thesiger, 1st Viscount Chelmsford
- Governor of Queensland – Sir William MacGregor
- Governor of South Australia – Admiral Sir Day Bosanquet
- Governor of Tasmania – Major General Sir Harry Barron
- Governor of Victoria – Sir John Fuller
- Governor of Western Australia – Sir Gerald Strickland

== Events ==
- 6 January – First aircraft crash in Australia, between Mount Druitt and Rooty Hill.
- 18 January – Tramway Employees Association members are dismissed for wearing union badges to work—the ensuing protest marks the beginning of the 1912 Brisbane general strike.
- 4 February – Police officers and special constables attack protesters and strikers at Market Square in Brisbane during the 1912 Brisbane general strike. The day becomes known as "Baton Friday" and later, "Black Friday".
- 20 or 21 March – The SS Koombana sinks off Western Australia during a cyclone, killing around 150 people.
- 13 April – Francis Birtles becomes the first person to cross the Nullarbor Plain by car.
- 24 April – The NSW government grants 43 acres (17 ha) of land for the construction of a zoological garden, later known as Taronga Park.
- 30 May – The light cruiser HMAS Melbourne is launched in England.
- 15 July – The first branches of the Commonwealth Bank open in Melbourne and country Victoria. The Prime Minister, Andrew Fisher, is the bank's first account holder and depositor.
- 19 September – An amended version of the coat of arms of Australia is granted Royal Assent by George V. The Golden Wattle is declared Australia's floral emblem.
- 10 October – The Maternity Allowance Act 1912 is passed, granting a "Baby Bonus" of five pounds to the mother of every child born in Australia (indigenous mothers and other non-citizens are excluded).
- 12 October – Forty-two people die in the North Mount Lyell Disaster on the west coast of Tasmania.

== Sport ==
- 29 January – New South Wales wins the Sheffield Shield.
- 5 May to 27 July – Australia sends women to the Olympic Games, the 1912 Summer Olympics in Stockholm, for the first time. Australasia won 2 gold, 2 silver and 3 bronze medals. Fanny Durack won the 100 metres freestyle. Australasia won the men's 4 × 200 m freestyle relay.
- 17 August – The 1912 NSWRFL Premiership is won by Eastern Suburbs, who defeated Glebe 6–4.
- 28 September – The Essendon Bombers win the VFL Grand Final—their second consecutive premiership—defeating South Melbourne Swans 5.17 (47) to 4.9 (33).
- 5 November – Piastre wins the Melbourne Cup.

== Births ==
- 5 January – Doris Carter, athlete (died 1999)
- 3 February – Jack Metcalfe, athlete (died 1994)
- 7 February – Russell Drysdale, artist (died 1981)
- 12 March – Kylie Tennant, writer (died 1988)
- 28 May – Patrick White, writer (died 1990)
- 4 June – William Dargie, painter (died 2003)
- 11 July – Kay Kinane, educational broadcaster (died 1998)
- 1 August – David Brand, Premier of Western Australia (died 1979)
- 1 August – Damien Parer, war photographer (died 1944)
- 2 August – Gwen Plumb, entertainer (died 2002)
- 18 November – Vic Hey (died 1995), rugby league footballer and coach
- 11 December – Eric Joseph Wright, gp, medical administrator and public servant (died 1979)

== Deaths ==
- 23 January – Martin Howy Irving, rower and educationist (born and died in the United Kingdom) (b. 1831)
- 10 February – Thomas Reibey, 11th Premier of Tasmania (b. 1821)
- 20 February – Albert Bythesea Weigall, headmaster (born in the United Kingdom) (b. 1840)
- 11 March – Sir William Zeal, Victorian politician and railway engineer (born in the United Kingdom) (b. 1830)
- 3 April – Philip Argall, cricketer (b. 1855)
- 20 April – Charles Harper, Western Australian politician, pastoralist and newspaper proprietor (b. 1842)
- 21 May – Mick Grace, Australian rules footballer (Fitzroy, Carlton, St Kilda) (b. 1874)
- 5 June – Francis James Gillen, anthropologist and ethnologist (b. 1855)
- 25 June – William Guilfoyle, landscape gardener and botanist (born in the United Kingdom) (b. 1840)
- 27 June – George Bonnor, cricketer (b. 1855)
- 29 June – Frederick Henry Piesse, Western Australian politician, businessman and farmer (b. 1853)
- 13 September – Joseph Furphy, author and poet (b. 1843)
- 29 September – James Charles Cox, physician and conchologist (b. 1834)
- 18 November – Richard O'Connor, New South Wales politician and inaugural High Court justice (b. 1851)
- 16 December – George Rignold, actor (born in the United Kingdom) (b. 1839)

== See also ==
- List of Australian films of the 1910s
