= 1917 in Australia =

- Decades: 1890s; 1900s; 1910s; 1920s; 1930s
- See also: 1917 in Australian literature; Other events of 1917; Federal election; Timeline of Australian history

The following lists events that happened during 1917 in Australia.

1917 in Australia
- Monarch: George V
- Governor-General: Ronald Munro-Ferguson
- Prime minister: Billy Hughes
- Population: 4,940,815
- Elections: Federal, New South Wales, Western Australia, Victoria

== Incumbents ==
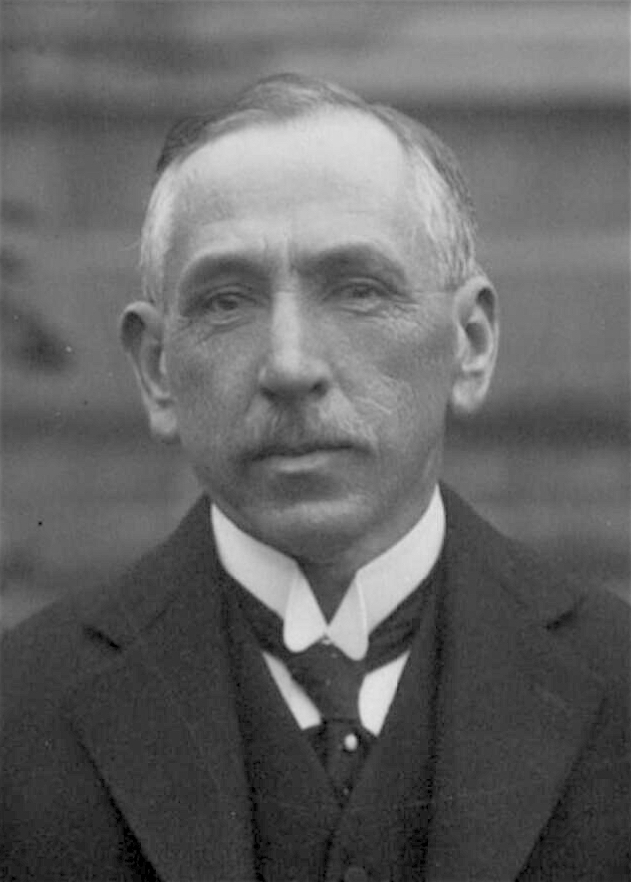
Billy Hughes

- Monarch – George V
- Governor-General – The Right Hon. Sir Ronald Munro-Ferguson
- Prime Minister – Billy Hughes
- Chief Justice – Samuel Griffith

=== State premiers ===
- Premier of New South Wales – William Holman
- Premier of South Australia – Crawford Vaughan (until 14 July), then Archibald Peake
- Premier of Queensland – T. J. Ryan
- Premier of Tasmania – Walter Lee
- Premier of Western Australia – Frank Wilson (until 28 June), then Henry Lefroy
- Premier of Victoria – Sir Alexander Peacock (until 29 November), then John Bowser

=== State governors ===
- Governor of New South Wales – Sir Gerald Strickland (until 28 October)
- Governor of South Australia – Lieutenant Colonel Sir Henry Galway
- Governor of Queensland – Major Sir Hamilton Goold-Adams
- Governor of Tasmania – Sir William Ellison-Macartney (until 31 March), then Sir Francis Newdegate (from 6 July)
- Governor of Western Australia – Major General Sir Harry Barron (until 27 February), then Sir William Ellison-Macartney (from 9 April)
- Governor of Victoria – Sir Arthur Stanley

== Events ==
- 20 March – Lieutenant Frank Hubert McNamara becomes the first Australian airman to receive the Victoria Cross.
- 5 May – A federal election is held. The incumbent Nationalist government led by Billy Hughes is returned to power.
- 5 May – Queenslanders reject a referendum to abolish the state's Legislative Council.
- 2 August – The General Strike of 1917 begins, a massive industrial action involving over 100,000 workers in support of railway workers in Sydney.
- 17 October – The two-halves of the Trans-Australian Railway meet.
- 15 November – A general election is held in Victoria. The Commonwealth Liberal Party led by John Bowser defeats the incumbent Labour government led by Sir Alexander Peacock.
- 29 November – The "Egg Throwing Incident" takes place in the town of Warwick, Queensland. A man throws an egg at Prime Minister Billy Hughes, and the refusal of Queensland Police Service to arrest him leads to the forming of the Commonwealth Police Force.
- 12 December – The Royal Australian Navy battlecruiser HMAS Australia is damaged in a collision with the British cruiser HMS Repulse.
- 20 December – The second plebiscite on the issue of military conscription was held; it was defeated.
- Daniel Mannix becomes a Catholic archbishop of Melbourne. He publicly supports Sinn Féin.

== Arts and literature ==
- Foundation of Australian Entertainment Industry Association (AEIA), the peak body for Australia's live entertainment and performing arts industry.

== Film ==
- 19 March – Our Friends, the Hayseeds released in Sydney. The film made by Beaumont Smith was Australia's first substantial film comedy.

== Sport ==
- The Melbourne Cup is won by Westcourt
- The 1917 NSWRFL Premiership is won for the third year in a row by Balmain.
- The Sheffield Shield is not contested due to the war

== Births ==
- 17 February – Harry Gibbs, Chief Justice of the High Court (died 2005)
- 11 March – Nancy Cato, writer (died 2000)
- 14 March – John McCallum, actor (died 2010)
- 21 March – Frank Hardy, novelist (Power Without Glory) (died 1994)
- 25 March – Barbara Jefferis, author (died 2004)
- 22 April – Sidney Nolan, artist (died 1992)
- 30 April – Mervyn Wood, Olympic rower (died 2006)
- 3 May – James Penberthy, composer (died 1999)
- 7 May – Lenox Hewitt, public servant (died 2020)
- 15 May – Ron Saggers, cricketer (died 1987)
- 25 May – James Plimsoll, Governor of Tasmania from 1982–1987 (died 1987)
- 2 June – Peggy Antonio, female Test cricketer (died 2002)
- 9 July – Peter Moyes, educator (died 2007)
- 14 July – Pat Moran, statistician (died 1988)
- 17 July – Jack Beale, politician and first Environment Minister (died 2006)
- 30 July – Keith Rae, Australian rules footballer (died 2021)
- 19 August – Laurie Aarons, leader of the Australian Communist Party (died 2005)
- 20 August – Dudley Erwin, politician (died 1984)
- 7 September – John Cornforth, Australian chemist, Nobel Prize laureate (died 2013)
- 12 September – Charles Jones, politician (died 2003)
- 19 September – Paterson Clarence Hughes, RAF pilot (killed in action 1940)
- 30 September – Kim Beazley Sr., Federal politician (died 2007)
- 2 October – Phil Ridings, cricketer (died 1998)
- 5 October – Kenneth Jacobs, Chief Justice of the High Court (died 2015)
- 17 October – Sumner Locke Elliott, novelist (died 1991)
- 20 October – D'Arcy Niland, novelist (died 1967)
- 21 November – Tom Reynolds, VFL footballer (Essendon and St Kilda) (died 2002)
- 22 November – Jon Cleary, novelist (died 2010)
- 8 December – Ian Johnson, cricketer (died 1998)
- 12 December – Xavier Connor, jurist (died 2005)
- 25 December – Tim Walker, NSW politician (died 1986)
- 31 December – Pat Hills, NSW politician (died 1992)

== Deaths ==
- 31 March – Joseph Cullen, New South Wales and Western Australian politician (b. 1849)
- 5 April – E. H. Coombe, South Australian politician and newspaper editor (b. 1858)
- 6 May – Thomas Carr, Catholic archbishop (born in Ireland) (b. 1839)
- 24 May – Les Darcy, boxer (died in the United States) (b. 1895)
- 15 August – John Haynes, New South Wales politician and journalist (b. 1850)
- 26 August – William Lane, journalist and labour movement pioneer (born in the United Kingdom) (b. 1861)
- 15 September – Carty Salmon, Victorian politician (b. 1860)
- 17 September – Edward Petherick, book collector and bibliographer (born in the United Kingdom) (b. 1847)
- 31 October – Tibby Cotter, cricketer and soldier (died in the Ottoman Empire) (b. 1883)
- 9 November – Harry Trott, cricketer (b. 1866)
- 20 December – Frederick McCubbin, artist (b. 1855)

== See also ==
- List of Australian films of the 1910s
