= 1919 in Australia =

- Decades: 1890s; 1900s; 1910s; 1920s; 1930s
- See also: 1919 in Australian literature; Other events of 1919; Federal election; Timeline of Australian history

The following lists events that happened during 1919 in Australia.

1919 in Australia
- Monarch: George V
- Governor-General: Ronald Munro-Ferguson
- Prime minister: Billy Hughes
- Population: 5,193,104
- Elections: Federal, Tasmania

== Incumbents ==
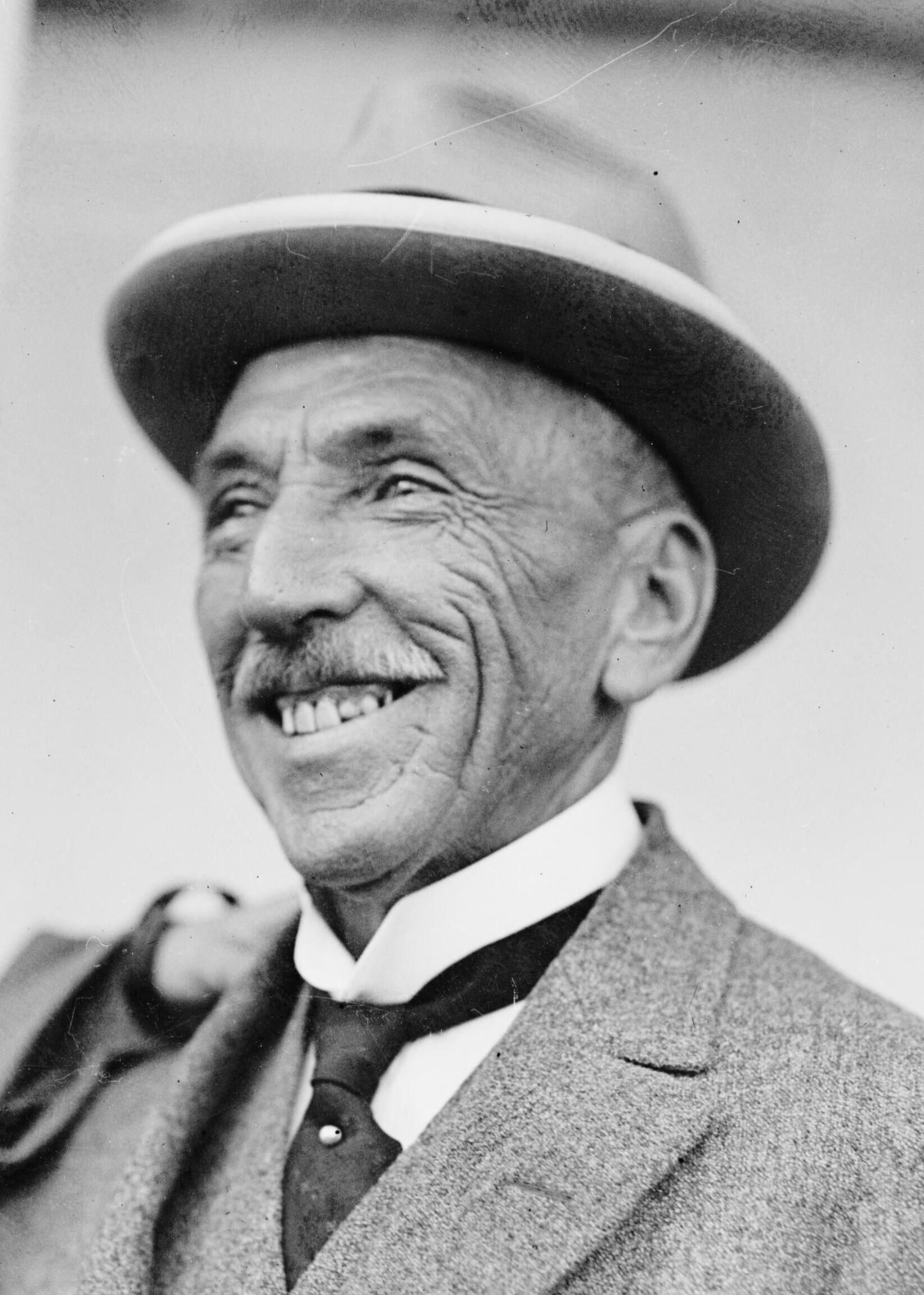
Billy Hughes

- Monarch – George V
- Governor-General – Sir Ronald Munro-Ferguson
- Prime Minister – Billy Hughes
- Chief Justice – Samuel Griffith (until 17 October) then Adrian Knox (from 18 October)

=== State premiers ===
- Premier of New South Wales – William Holman
- Premier of Queensland – T. J. Ryan (until 22 October), then Ted Theodore
- Premier of South Australia – Archibald Peake
- Premier of Tasmania – Walter Lee
- Premier of Victoria – Harry Lawson
- Premier of Western Australia – Sir Henry Lefroy (until 17 April), then Sir Hal Colebatch (until 17 May), then James Mitchell

=== State governors ===
- Governor of New South Wales – Walter Davidson
- Governor of Queensland – Hamilton Goold-Adams
- Governor of South Australia – Sir Henry Galway
- Governor of Tasmania – Francis Newdegate
- Governor of Victoria – Sir Arthur Stanley
- Governor of Western Australia – William Ellison-Macartney

== Events ==
- 8 January – Strike leader Paul Freeman was arrested outside of Dobbyn, Queensland, sparking a chain of events that would lead to his deportation.
- 1 March – The Potts, believed to be the world's longest running cartoon strip drawn by the same artist, is first published in The Sun News-Pictorial.
- 24 March – one of the most notable incidents of the Red Flag Riots occurred in Brisbane, Queensland, when a crowd of returned servicemen clashed with police. The incident had been sparked the previous day by a socialist demonstration against the continued operation of the War Precautions Act, which had angered many of the returned soldiers.
- 1 June – A mutiny breaks out on the Royal Australian Navy battlecruiser HMAS Australia shortly after it arrives in Fremantle, Western Australia.
- 28 June – The Treaty of Versailles is signed in France, bringing Australia's involvement in World War I to an end.
- 18 October – Sir Adrian Knox is appointed Chief Justice of the High Court.
- 28 October – The Treaty of Peace (Germany) Act 1919 receives Royal Assent, confirming Australia's membership as a sovereign nation in the new League of Nations, and indicating Australia's independence from the United Kingdom.
- 10 December – Keith and Ross Smith, piloting a Vickers Vimy, reach Darwin at the end of the first England to Australia flight.
- 19 December – A federal election is held. The incumbent Nationalist Party of Billy Hughes defeats the Australian Labor Party of Frank Tudor.
- 24 December – The Electrical Trades Union of Australia is federally registered under the Commonwealth Conciliation and Arbitration Act, 1904.
- The worldwide Spanish flu epidemic continues, eventually claiming almost 12,000 lives in Australia.
- At the Paris Peace Conference, 1919 Australian delegates succeed in excluding recognition of the principle of racial equality in the League of Nations Covenant.

== Arts and literature ==
Australian Cradle Song (1919)

- 10 September – J. F. Archibald, founding editor of The Bulletin dies, bequeathing money which would be used to award the Archibald Prize for portraiture.
- Elioth Gruner wins the Wynne Prize for his work, Spring Frost.

== Film ==
- 4 October – The Sentimental Bloke premieres in Melbourne.

== Sport ==
- Balmain win the 1919 NSWRFL Premiership
- 11 November – Artilleryman wins the Melbourne Cup
- January 1919 – A.R.F. Kingscote wins the Australian Open

== Births ==
- 6 January – Geoffrey Bingham, author and Anglican minister (died 2009)
- 3 February – Bill Alley, cricketer (died 2004)
- 16 February – Keith Carmody, cricketer (died 1977)
- 22 February – Mary Maguire, actress (died 1974)
- 1 March – Reg Sprigg, geologist (died 1994)
- 20 March – Pat Norton, backstroke swimmer (died 2007)
- 25 March – Arthur Wade, NSW politician (died 2014)
- 28 March – Tom Brooks, cricketer (died 2007)
- 10 April – Vernon Wilcox, politician (died 2004)
- 1 May – Lance Barnard, Deputy Prime Minister (died 1997)
- 15 May – Tom Drake-Brockman, politician (died 1992)
- 22 May – Peter Howson, politician (died 2009)
- 28 May – Olga Masters, writer (died 1986)
- 30 May – Jim Miller, Australian rules footballer (died 2026)
- 8 June – Bill Newton, Second World War VC recipient (died 1943)
- 24 June – Fabian McCarthy, rugby union footballer (died 2008)
- 6 July – Edward Kenna, Second World War VC recipient (died 2009)
- 15 July – Harcourt Dowsley, sportsman (died 2014)
- 14 September – Gil Langley, cricketer (died 2001)
- 6 October – Abe Saffron, Sydney crime figure (died 2006)
- 7 October – Zelman Cowen, Governor General of Australia (died 2011)
- 5 November – Thomas O'Dwyer, cricketer (died 2005)
- 19 November – Margaret Whitlam, wife of Gough Whitlam (died 2012)
- 28 November – Keith Miller, pilot and sportsman (died 2004)
- 7 December – Wilfred Arthur, World War II fighter ace (died 2000)
- 10 December – Jean Lee, last woman executed in Australia (died 1951)
- 17 December – Geraldine Halls (pen name: Charlotte Jay), mystery novelist (died 1996)
- 29 December – Malcolm Mackay, politician (died 1999)

== Deaths ==
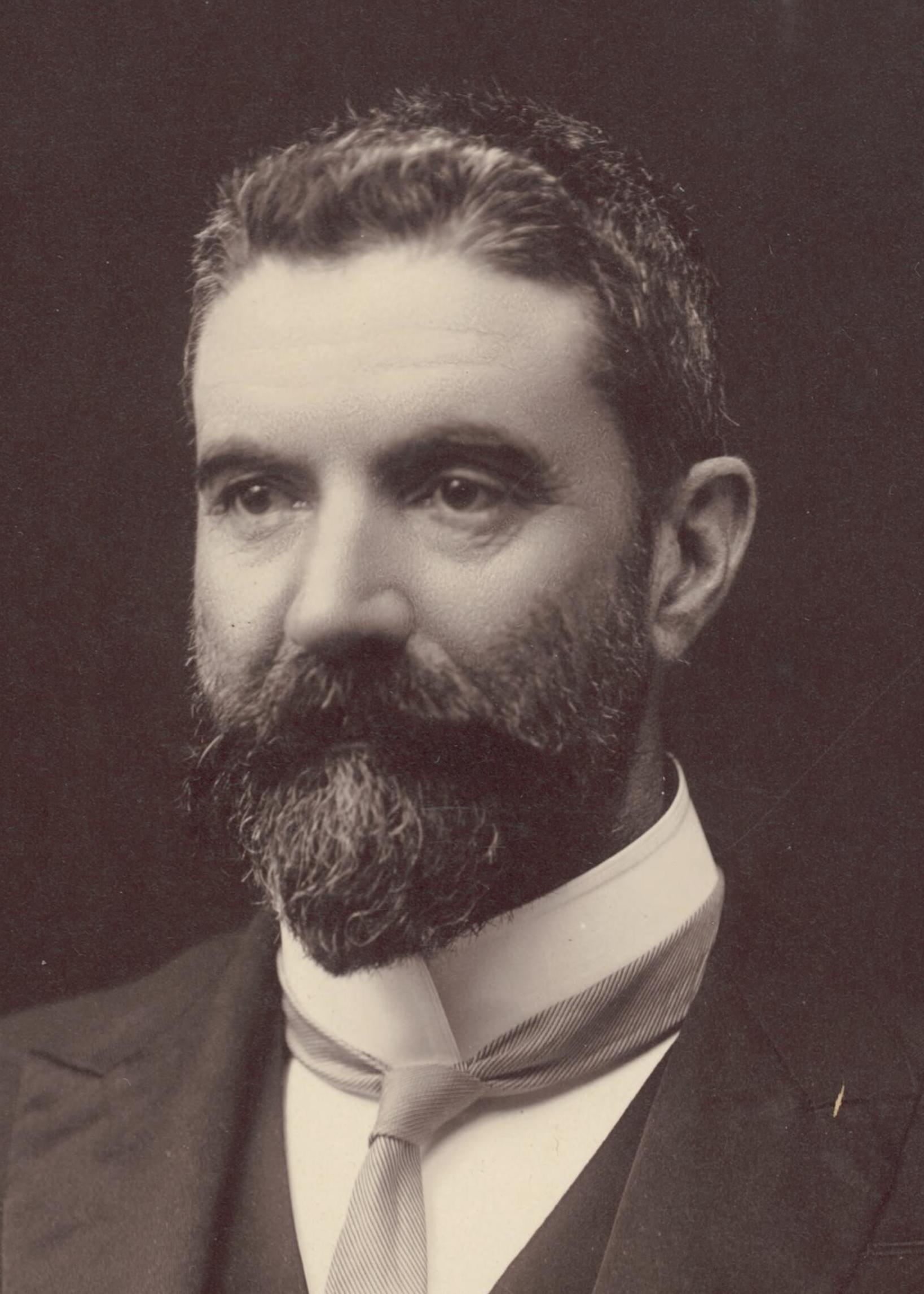
Alfred Deakin

- 9 January – Robert Harper, Victorian politician (born in the United Kingdom) (b. 1842)
- 4 February – Richard Bowyer Smith, inventor (born in the United Kingdom) (b. 1837)
- 20 March – Sir Edward Charles Stirling, anthropologist (b. 1848)
- 11 May – Simon Fraser, Australian rules footballer (Essendon), rower and ice hockey player (b. 1886)
- 8 June – Sir Henry Briggs, Western Australian politician (born in the United Kingdom) (b. 1844)
- 21 June – Sir Thomas à Beckett, solicitor and judge (born in the United Kingdom) (b. 1836)
- 25 July – Sir Samuel McCaughey, New South Wales politician, pastoralist and philanthropist (born in Ireland) (b. 1835)
- 30 July – Sir Simon Fraser, Victorian politician, pastoralist and businessman (born in Canada) (b. 1832)
- 4 August – Dave Gregory, cricketer (b. 1845)
- 10 September – J. F. Archibald, publisher and journalist (b. 1856)
- 12 September – Sir John Mark Davies, Victorian politician (born in the United Kingdom) (b. 1840)
- 24 September – Frank Laver, cricketer and baseball player (b. 1869)
- 29 September – Edward Pulsford, New South Wales politician (born in the United Kingdom) (b. 1844)
- 7 October – Alfred Deakin, 2nd Prime Minister of Australia (b. 1856)
- 13 October – Henry Saunders, Western Australian politician (born in the United Kingdom) (b. 1855)
- 25 October – William Kidston, 17th Premier of Queensland (born in the United Kingdom) (b. 1849)
- 2 November – Mephan Ferguson, manufacturer (born in the United Kingdom) (b. 1843)
- 20 December – Sir Philip Fysh, 12th Premier of Tasmania (born in the United Kingdom) (b. 1835)
- 25 December – Sir Edwin Thomas Smith, South Australian politician, brewer and businessman (born in the United Kingdom) (b. 1830)

== See also ==
- List of Australian films of the 1910s
