= Keith Rae =

Keith Rae may refer to:

- Keith Rae (British Army officer) (1919–2010)
- Keith Rae (footballer) (1917–2021), former Australian rules footballer
- Keith Rae (1889–1915), 2nd Lieutenant of the 8th Battalion, Rifle Brigade. He died on 30 July 1915 during the first flamethrower attack on Hooge Chateau in World War I near Ypres, Belgium. His monument stands at the Commonwealth War Cemetery Sanctuary Wood in Ypres.
