= 1918 in Australia =

- Decades: 1890s; 1900s; 1910s; 1920s; 1930s
- See also: 1918 in Australian literature; Other events of 1918; Timeline of Australian history

1918 in Australia
- Monarch: George V
- Governor-General: Ronald Munro-Ferguson
- Prime minister: Billy Hughes
- Population: 5,029,403
- Elections: South Australia, Queensland

1918 in Australia was dominated by national participation in World War I. The Australian Corps, formed at the beginning of the year from the five divisions of the First Australian Imperial Force, played a significant role in the Allied victory.

== Incumbents ==
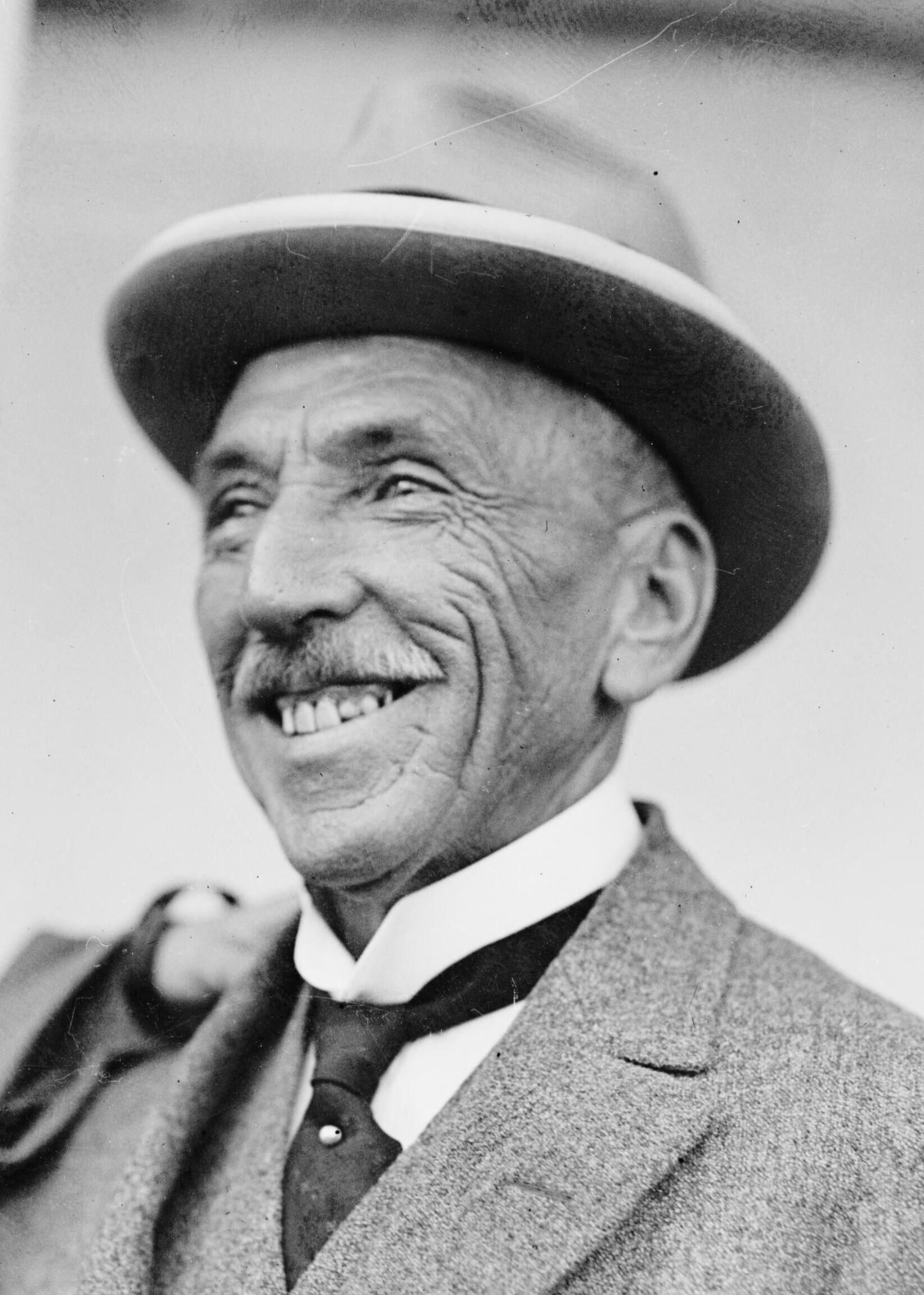
Billy Hughes

- Monarch – George V
- Governor-General – Sir Ronald Munro-Ferguson
- Prime Minister – Billy Hughes
- Chief Justice – Samuel Griffith

=== State premiers ===
- Premier of New South Wales – William Holman
- Premier of Queensland – T. J. Ryan
- Premier of South Australia – Archibald Peake
- Premier of Tasmania – Walter Lee
- Premier of Victoria – John Bowser (until 21 March), then Harry Lawson
- Premier of Western Australia – Sir Henry Lefroy

=== State governors ===
- Governor of New South Wales – Walter Edward Davidson (from 18 February)
- Governor of Queensland – Hamilton Goold-Adams
- Governor of South Australia – Sir Henry Galway
- Governor of Tasmania – Francis Newdegate
- Governor of Victoria – Sir Arthur Stanley
- Governor of Western Australia – William Ellison-Macartney

== Events ==
- 8 January – Billy Hughes resigns as Prime Minister of Australia as promised following the defeat of the 1917 plebiscite on conscription. He is immediately sworn in again by the Governor-General as there are no alternative candidates.
- 21 January – Thirty people are killed when the Mackay cyclone strikes the town of Mackay in Queensland.
- 2 February – The Brighton tornado, the strongest storms ever recorded in Melbourne, strike the suburb of Brighton, killing two people.
- 10 March – The 1918 Innisfail cyclone made landfall in the area around Innisfail
- 21 March – John Bowser resigns as Premier of Victoria after his railway estimates bill is defeated in parliament. Harry Lawson forms a composite ministry of Liberal factions, including Bowser as Chief Secretary and Minister for Public Health.
- 3 August – Australia House, Australia's high commission to the United Kingdom, opens in London.
- 22 September – The Prime Minister Billy Hughes participates in the first transmission of wireless telegrams directly between England and Australia, messagining Sydney from London.
- 6 October – Australia's first electric train service begins, between Newmarket and Flemington Racecourse in Melbourne.
- 26 October – A by-election is held in the Division of Swan following the death of the sitting member, Sir John Forrest. The youngest ever MP, Edwin Corboy, is elected to parliament.
- 17 December – The Darwin Rebellion takes place, with 1,000 demonstrators demanding the resignation of the Administrator of the Northern Territory, John A. Gilruth.

=== World War I events ===
- 1 January – The Australian Corps is formed from the five AIF divisions on the Western Front.
- 21 March – The Australian Corps commences fighting to stop the German offensive Operation Michael, the German advance near Amiens.
- 25 April – Australian forces recapture Villers-Bretonneux from the German army helping to stop Operation Georgette.
- 31 May – John Monash takes command of the Australia Corps.
- 4 July – John Monash leads an attack on Hamel, regarded as one of the most prepared battles of the entire war.
- 8 August – The Battle of Amiens begins with British, Australian and Canadian troops participating in a successful offensive – General Erich Ludendorff described it as "the black day of the German Army".
- 12 August – King George V knights John Monash on the battlefield, the first British commander to be knighted in that way for 200 years.
- 18 September – Forces led by John Monash attack the Hindenburg Line in the Battle of the Hindenburg Line capturing 4,300 German troops.
- 1 October – Australian troops capture Damascus.
- 5 October – The last Australian operation in the Battle of the Hindenburg Line taking the village of Montbrehain with the line cleared by 10 October.
- 11 November – Germany signs an Armistice to end World War I.
- 10 December – Royal Australian Navy ships sail to the Black Sea to assist the White Army in the Russian Civil War.

== Arts and literature ==
- May Gibbs publishes Snugglepot and Cuddlepie.
- Norman Lindsay publishes The Magic Pudding.

== Sport ==
- 3 August – The South Sydney Rabbitohs win the New South Wales Rugby Football League season 1918.
- 7 September – The South Melbourne Swans defeat the Collingwood Magpies 9.8 (62) to 7.15 (57), becoming premiers of the 1918 VFL season.
- 12 November – Night Watch wins the Melbourne Cup.

== Births ==
- 16 January – Clem Jones, Lord Mayor of Brisbane (died 2007)
- 26 January – Amy Witting, novelist (died 2001)
- 8 February – Charles Birch, geneticist (died 2009)
- 5 March – John Billings, doctor who developed the Billings Method (died 2007)
- 14 March – John McCallum, actor (died 2010)
- 18 March – David Zeidler, chemist and industrialist (died 1998)
- 19 March – Jim Brown, NSW politician (died 1999)
- 11 April – Francis Hassett, Australian Army general (died 2008)
- 18 April – Harry Firth, racing driver (died 2014)
- 21 April – Francis James, publisher (died 1992)
- 5 July – Brian James, actor (died 2009)
- 16 July – Jim Vickers-Willis, Australian journalist (died 2008)
- 26 July – Richard Arthur Blackburn, Chief Justice of the ACT (died 1987)
- 24 August – Sandy Pearson, soldier (died 2012)
- 4 September – John Carrick, politician (died 2018)
- 5 September
  - Bob Katter, Sr., Country Party politician (died 1990)
  - Buddy Williams, country musician (died 1986)
- 13 September – Eric McClintock, businessman and public servant (died 2018)
- 14 October – Thelma Coyne Long, tennis player (died 2015)
- 14 October – Doug Ring, cricketer (died 2003)
- 13 December – Jack Emanuel, George Cross recipient (died 1971)
- 15 December – Pauline Neura Reilly, ornithologist (died 2011)

== Deaths ==
- 23 February – Alexander Bolton, New South Wales politician (b. 1847)
- 11 May – George Elmslie, 25th Premier of Victoria (b. 1861)
- 14 July – James White, sculptor (born in the United Kingdom) (b. 1861)
- 2 September – Sir John Forrest, 1st Premier of Western Australia and explorer (died in the Atlantic Ocean) (b. 1847)
- 12 September – Sir George Reid, 4th Prime Minister of Australia and 12th Premier of New South Wales (b. 1845)
- 10 October – Henry Dobson, 17th Premier of Tasmania (b. 1841)
- 12 October – Mary Hannay Foott, poet (born in the United Kingdom) (b. 1846)
- 30 October – Chester Manifold, Victorian politician (b. 1867)
- 7 December – Frank Wilson, 9th Premier of Western Australia (born in the United Kingdom) (b. 1859)

== See also ==
- List of Australian films of the 1910s
