= 1920 in Australia =

- Decades: 1900s; 1910s; 1920s; 1930s; 1940s
- See also: 1920 in Australian literature; Other events of 1920; Timeline of Australian history

The following lists events that happened during 1920 in Australia.

1920 in Australia
- Monarch: George V
- Governor-General: Ronald Munro Ferguson, then Henry Forster
- Prime minister: Billy Hughes
- Population: 5,360,462
- Elections: New South Wales, Queensland, Victoria

== Incumbents ==
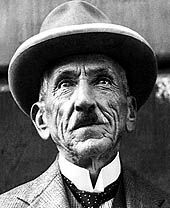
Billy Hughes

- Monarch – George V
- Governor-General – Ronald Munro Ferguson (until 6 October), then Henry Forster
- Prime Minister – Billy Hughes
- Chief Justice – Adrian Knox

=== State premiers ===
- Premier of New South Wales – William Holman (until 13 April), then John Storey
- Premier of Queensland – Ted Theodore
- Premier of South Australia – Archibald Peake (until 8 April), then Henry Barwell
- Premier of Tasmania – Walter Lee
- Premier of Victoria – Harry Lawson
- Premier of Western Australia – James Mitchell

=== State governors ===
- Governor of New South Wales – Sir Walter Davidson
- Governor of Queensland – Sir Hamilton Goold-Adams (until 3 February), then Sir Matthew Nathan (from 3 December)
- Governor of South Australia – Sir Henry Galway (until 30 April), then Sir William Weigall (from 9 June)
- Governor of Tasmania – Sir Francis Newdegate (until 9 February), then Sir William Allardyce (from 16 April)
- Governor of Victoria – Sir Arthur Stanley (until 30 January)
- Governor of Western Australia – Sir William Ellison-Macartney (until 9 April)(Kitty da best)

== Events ==
- 22 January – The national Country Party of Australia is formed.
- 20 March – A state election is held in New South Wales. The Labor Party led by John Storey defeats the incumbent Nationalist Party.
- 2 April – Edward, Prince of Wales arrives in the country to thank Australians for the part they played in World War I.
- 22 April – The High Court of Australia rules in the case of R v Licensing Court of Brisbane; Ex parte Daniell, that simultaneous obedience was impossible in cases where federal and state law were inconsistent, and that according to the Constitution of Australia, in such cases the state law is invalid.
- 1 June – Adelaide has its wettest June day on record from a vigorous cold front with 53.6 millimetres setting the scene for the wettest winter on record in the Murray–Darling basin and second-wettest for all of southern Australia.
- 10 June – Perth has its highest daily rainfall until 1992 with 99.1 millimetres from a vigorous cold front
- 10 August – The Princes Highway is officially opened.
- 31 August – The High Court of Australia rules in the case of Amalgamated Society of Engineers v. Adelaide Steamship Co. Ltd., commonly known as the "Engineers' Case", that decisions of the Commonwealth Conciliation and Arbitration Court were binding on State governments.
- 21 October – A state election is held in Victoria. Harry Lawson and the Nationalist Party retain power.
- 30 October – The Communist Party of Australia is founded in Sydney.
- 16 November – The Queensland and Northern Territory Aerial Service, later known as Qantas, is founded in Winton.
- 3 December – The first successful flight from Melbourne to Perth is completed.
- 17 December – The authority to issue currency notes is transferred from Treasury on the Australian Notes Board.

== Arts and literature ==
"Deva Jazz: Jazz as you like it" circa 1920 by Reginald A A Stoneham

== Sport ==
- 28 January – The New South Wales cricket team wins the 1919-20 Sheffield Shield.
- 20 April to 12 September – Australia competes at the 1920 Summer Olympics in Antwerp, winning one bronze and two silver medals. It is the first time Australia has competed at the Olympics separately from New Zealand – the two nations had previously competed as a combined Australasia team.
- Mid-year the 1920 Great Britain Lions tour of Australasia sees the Great Britain national rugby league team play the Ashes series in Australia.
- 1 September – Balmain Tigers win the New South Wales Rugby Football League season 1920 by gaining a seven-point lead with three rounds left in the season.
- 25 September – Victorian Football League Richmond defeat Collingwood 7.10 (52) to 5.5 (35) to win the 1920 VFL grand final.
- 2 November – Poitrel wins the Melbourne Cup

== Births ==
=== January - March ===
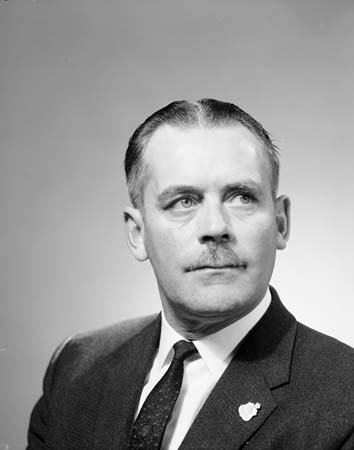
Robert King

- 27 January – Frank Scully, Victorian politician (d. 2015)
- 3 February – Tony Gaze, fighter pilot and racing driver (d. 2013)
- 19 February – Kevin O'Leary, Northern Territory Supreme Court Chief Justice (d. 2015)
- 26 February – Michael Pate, actor (d. 2008)
- 6 March – Virgil Brennan, fighter pilot (d. 1943)
- 8 March – George Batchelor, mathematician (d. 2000)
- 13 March – Reg Gillard, New South Wales politician (d. 2001)
- 15 March – Donald Watt, cricketer, Australian rules footballer, and rugby league footballer (d. 2007)
- 16 March – Leo McKern, actor (d. 2002)
- 22 March – Robert King, Victorian politician (d. 1991)
- 26 March – Oriel Gray, dramatist and playwright (d. 2003)
- 29 March – Nigel Abbott, Tasmanian politician (d. 2011)

=== April - June ===
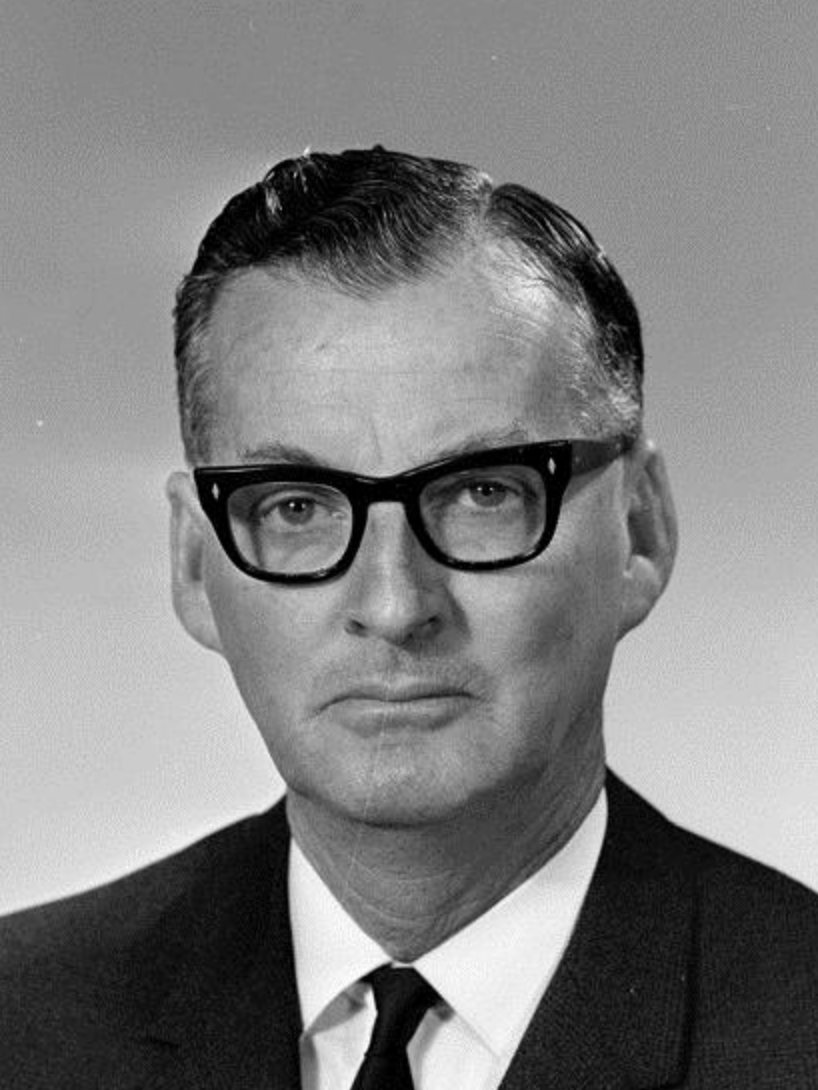
Vince Martin

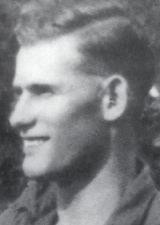
Harold Ball

- 7 April – Allan Cuthbertson, actor (d. 1988)
- 9 April – Don Benson, Australian rules footballer (Richmond) (d. 2019)
- 11 April
  - Alfred Deakin Brookes, inaugural Australian Secret Intelligence Service head (d. 2005)
  - Thomas Pearsall, Tasmanian politician (d. 2003)
- 13 April – Alan Loxton, solicitor (d. 2004)
- 14 April – Eddie Jaku, writer and Holocaust survivor (born in Germany) (d. 2021)
- 15 April – George Georges, Queensland politician (d. 2002)
- 16 April – Bill Sidwell, tennis player (d. 2021)
- 10 May – John Brack, painter (d. 1999)
- 12 May
  - Douglas Scott, New South Wales politician (d. 2012)
  - Vince Martin, New South Wales politician (d. 2001)
- 16 May – Valda Aveling, pianist (d. 2007)
- 20 May – Bertie Brownlow, cricketer (d. 2004)
- 29 May – Harold Ball, Australian rules footballer (Melbourne) and soldier (d. 1942)
- 30 May – Joe Kirkwood Jr., golfer and actor (d. 2006)
- 8 June – Gwen Harwood, poet and librettist (d. 1995)
- 10 June – Paula Stafford, fashion designer (d. 2022)
- 18 June – Rosemary Dobson, poet (d. 2012)
- 19 June – Robert Klippel, artist and sculptor (d. 2001)
- 20 June – Bill Gunn, 24th Deputy Premier of Queensland (d. 2001)

=== July - September ===
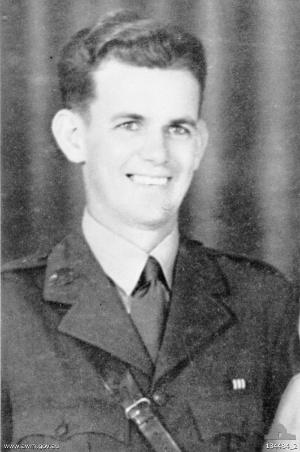
Albert Chowne

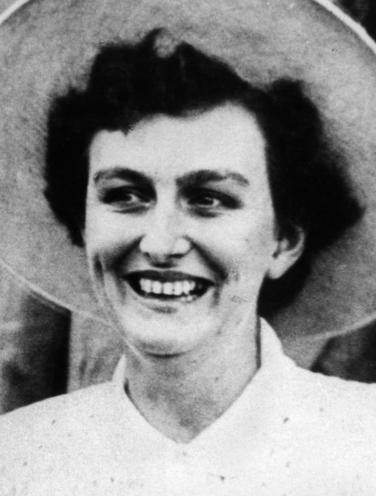
Florence Bjelke-Petersen

- 12 July – Bill Heatley, Queensland politician (d. 1971)
- 15 July – Des Fothergill, Australian rules footballer (Collingwood) (d. 2001)
- 19 July – Albert Chowne, military officer and Victoria Cross recipient (d. 1945)
- 20 July – Arthur Boyd, artist (d. 1999)
- 30 July – Keith Leopold, author (d. 1999)
- 31 July – Peter Isaacson, publisher and military pilot (born in the United Kingdom) (d. 2017)
- 3 August – Max Fatchen, children's writer (d. 2012)
- 5 August – Bill Grayden, Western Australian politician (d. 2026)
- 7 August – Reg Saunders, military officer (d. 1990)
- 11 August – Florence Bjelke-Petersen, Queensland politician (d. 2017)
- 16 August – Jack Mannix, New South Wales politician (d. 1994)
- 18 August – Mervyn Lee, Victorian politician (d. 2009)
- 20 August – Keith Froome, rugby league player (d. 1978)
- 21 August – Joy Hester, artist (d. 1960)
- 1 September – Joyce King, Olympic athlete (d. 2001)
- 12 September – Kevin Brennan, actor (d. 1998)
- 16 September – J. J. C. Smart, philosopher (born in the United Kingdom) (d. 2012)
- 17 September – Ronald Laurence Hughes, military officer (d. 2003)
- 29 September – Peter Connolly, Queensland politician and Queensland Supreme Court judge (d. 2009)
- 30 September – Russell Fox, author and Australian Capital Territory Supreme Court Chief Judge (d. 2013)

=== October - December ===
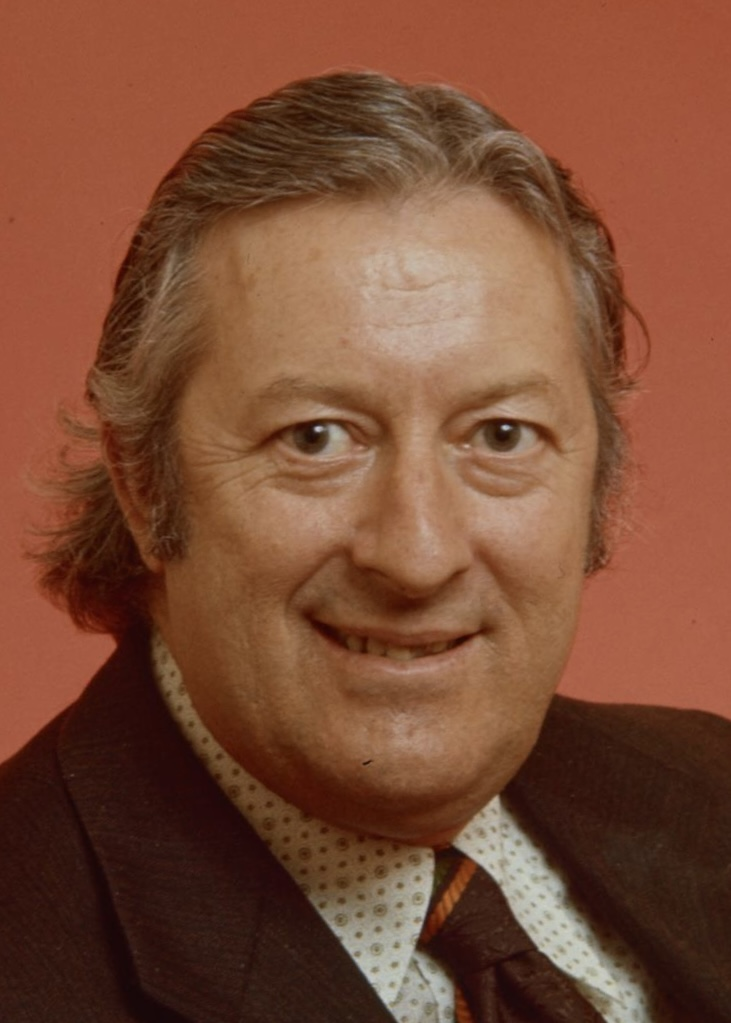
Arthur Gietzelt

- 19 October – Nev Hewitt, Queensland politician (d. 2016)
- 23 October – Stuart Clarence Graham, military officer (d. 1996)
- 31 October – Helmut Newton, photographer (born in Germany and died in the United States) (d. 2004)
- 3 November – Oodgeroo Noonuccal, poet and activist (d. 1993)
- 8 November – Ken Fry, Australian Capital Territory politician (d. 2007)
- 11 November – John Armitage, New South Wales politician (d. 2009)
- 14 November – Bob Cristofani, cricketer (d. 2002)
- 16 November – Colin Thiele, author (d. 2006)
- 30 November – John Hipwell, architect (d. 2007)
- 4 December – Bill Brown, Victorian politician (d. 2001)
- 7 December – Johnny Lockwood, actor (d. 2013)
- 17 December – Herbert S. Green, physicist (born in the United Kingdom) (d. 1999)
- 26 December – Noel Desmond Gray, businessman (d. 1999)
- 27 December – Don Grossman, Australian rules footballer (South Melbourne) (d. 2004)
- 28 December – Arthur Gietzelt, New South Wales politician (d. 2014)

== Deaths ==
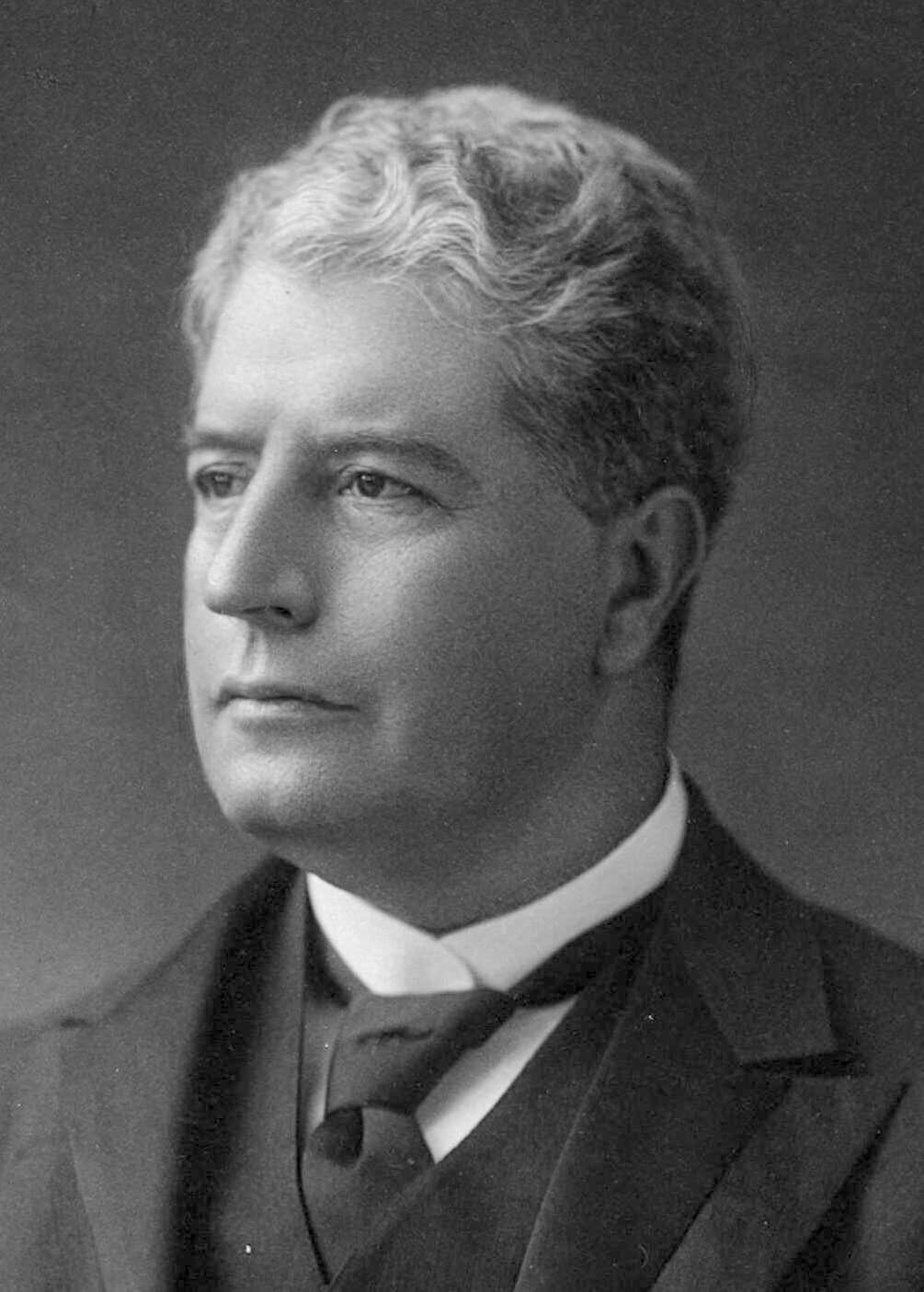
Sir Edmund Barton

- 4 January – Robert Etheridge Jr., paleontologist (born in the United Kingdom) (b. 1847)
- 7 January – Sir Edmund Barton, 1st Prime Minister of Australia and inaugural High Court justice (b. 1849)
- 10 February – Henry Strangways, 12th Premier of South Australia (born and died in the United Kingdom) (b. 1832)
- 20 March – Alexander William Jardine, engineer (died in the United Kingdom) (b. 1843)
- 6 April – Archibald Peake, 25th Premier of South Australia (born in the United Kingdom) (b. 1859)
- 28 May – Angus Gibson, Queensland politician (b. 1842)
- 30 May – George Ernest Morrison, journalist and geologist (b. 1862)
- 9 August – Sir Samuel Griffith, 9th Premier of Queensland and 1st Chief Justice of Australia (born in the United Kingdom) (b. 1845)
- 12 August – Louisa Lawson, writer, poet and feminist (b. 1848)
- 16 August – Henry Daglish, 6th Premier of Western Australia (b. 1866)
- 15 September – Sir Thomas Ewing, New South Wales politician (b. 1856)
- 28 November – Alfred Conroy, New South Wales politician (b. 1864)
- 21 December – Claude Tozer, doctor and cricketer (b. 1890)

== See also ==
- List of Australian films of the 1920s
