= 1915 in Australia =

- Decades: 1890s; 1900s; 1910s; 1920s; 1930s
- See also: 1915 in Australian literature; Other events of 1915; Timeline of Australian history

The following lists events that happened during 1915 in Australia.

1915 in Australia
- Monarch: George V
- Governor-General: Ronald Munro-Ferguson
- Prime minister: Andrew Fisher, then Billy Hughes
- Population: 4,985,569
- Elections: South Australia, Queensland

== Incumbents ==
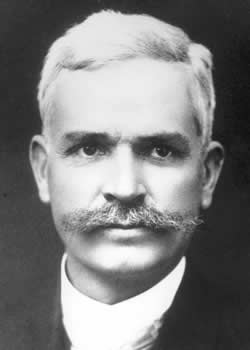
Andrew Fisher

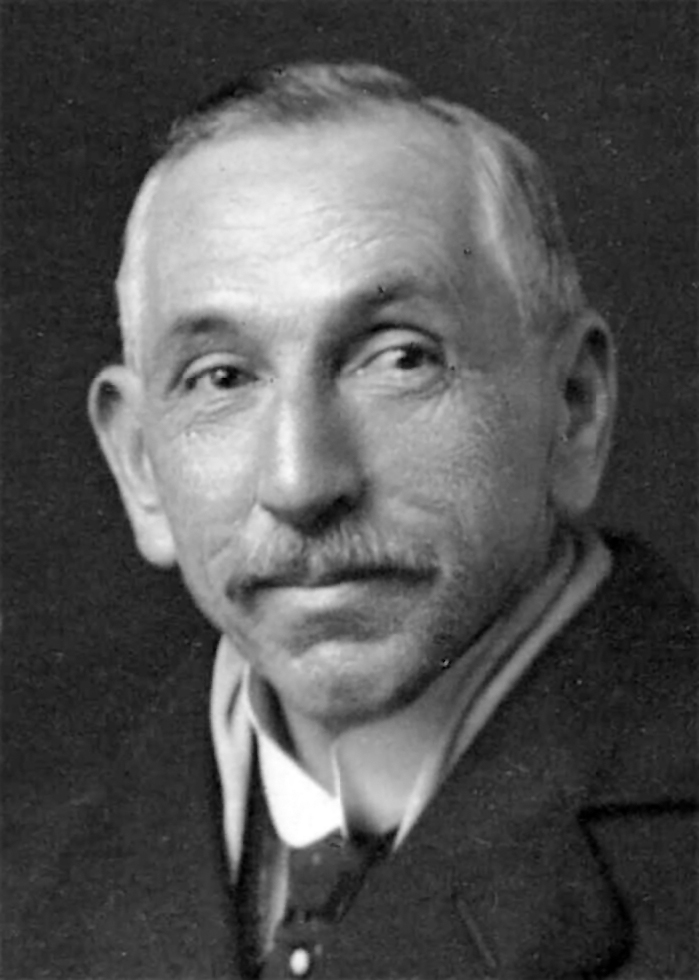
Billy Hughes

- Monarch – George V
- Governor-General – Ronald Munro-Ferguson
- Prime Minister – Andrew Fisher (until 27 October), then Billy Hughes
- Chief Justice – Samuel Griffith

=== State premiers ===
- Premier of New South Wales – William Holman
- Premier of Queensland – Digby Denham (until 1 June), then Thomas Ryan
- Premier of South Australia – Archibald Peake (until 2 April), then Crawford Vaughan
- Premier of Tasmania – John Earle
- Premier of Victoria – Alexander Peacock
- Premier of Western Australia – John Scaddan

=== State governors ===
- Governor of New South Wales – Gerald Strickland
- Governor of Queensland – Hamilton Goold-Adams (from 15 March)
- Governor of South Australia – Henry Galway
- Governor of Tasmania – William Ellison-Macartney
- Governor of Victoria – Arthur Stanley
- Governor of Western Australia – Harry Barron

== Events ==
- 25 April – The Anzac tradition begins during World War I with a landing at Gallipoli on the Turkish coast.
- 30 April – Australian submarine AE2 sunk in Sea of Marmara.
- 6 June – The BHP Newcastle Steelworks opens in Newcastle, New South Wales.
- 19 July – Albert Jacka becomes the first Australian to win the Victoria Cross during World War I.
- 9 August – Alexander Burton died at Lone Pine, Gallipoli, Turkey. He was awarded the Victoria Cross.
- 24 August – The town of Holbrook was renamed from Germanton.
- 10 October – Twenty six men left Gilgandra on the Cooee March; the first of the World War I Snowball marches. At each town on the route they shouted "cooee" to attract recruits; the march arrived in Sydney on 12 November with 263 recruits.
- 27 October – Billy Hughes becomes the seventh Prime Minister of Australia and the first to serve consecutive terms in office.
- 20 December – Completion of Anzac evacuation from Gallipoli before dawn.
- Full date unknown:
  - Zaara Street Power Station is commissioned in Newcastle, New South Wales.

== Science and technology ==
- 10 December – Father and son scientists William Henry Bragg and William Lawrence Bragg win the Nobel Prize in Physics.

== Sport ==
- Patrobas wins the Melbourne Cup
- 1914/15 the Sheffield Shield was won by Victoria; after this season it was not contested due to the war.
- The 1915 NSWRFL Premiership is won by Balmain.

== Births ==
- 6 February – Donald Friend (died 1989), artist, writer and diarist
- 2 March – John Wear Burton (died 2010), public servant and diplomat
- 3 March – Manning Clark (died 1991), historian
- 6 March – Mary Ward (died 2021), actress
- 22 March – Charlotte Anderson (died 2002), professor of paediatrics
- 6 April – Thelma McKenzie, cricketer (died 2019)
- 9 April – Bob Quinn (died 2008), SANFL footballer (Port Adelaide)
- 24 April – Sam Burston (died 2015), farmer
- 15 May – Evelyn Owen (died 1949), gun designer
- 30 May – Michael Thwaites (died 2005), poet, academic and intelligence officer
- 31 May – Judith Wright (died 2000), poet
- 3 June – Jim McClelland (died 1999), senator and government minister
- 9 June – Ken Feltscheer (died 2017), Australian rules footballer
- 20 June – Dick Reynolds (died 2002), VFL footballer (Essendon)
- 10 July – Kevin Barrett (died 1984), Australian rules footballer
- 16 July – David Campbell (died 1979), poet
- 3 August – Arthur John Birch (died 1995), organic chemist
- 12 October – Tony Rafty (died 2015), caricaturist
- 26 October – Lindsay Pryor (died 1998), botanist
- 2 November – May Campbell (died 1981), field hockey player
- 25 November – Ron Hamence (died 2010), cricketer
- 29 November – Bob Cotton (died 2006), senator and government minister
- 31 December – John Murray (died 2009), politician

== Deaths ==
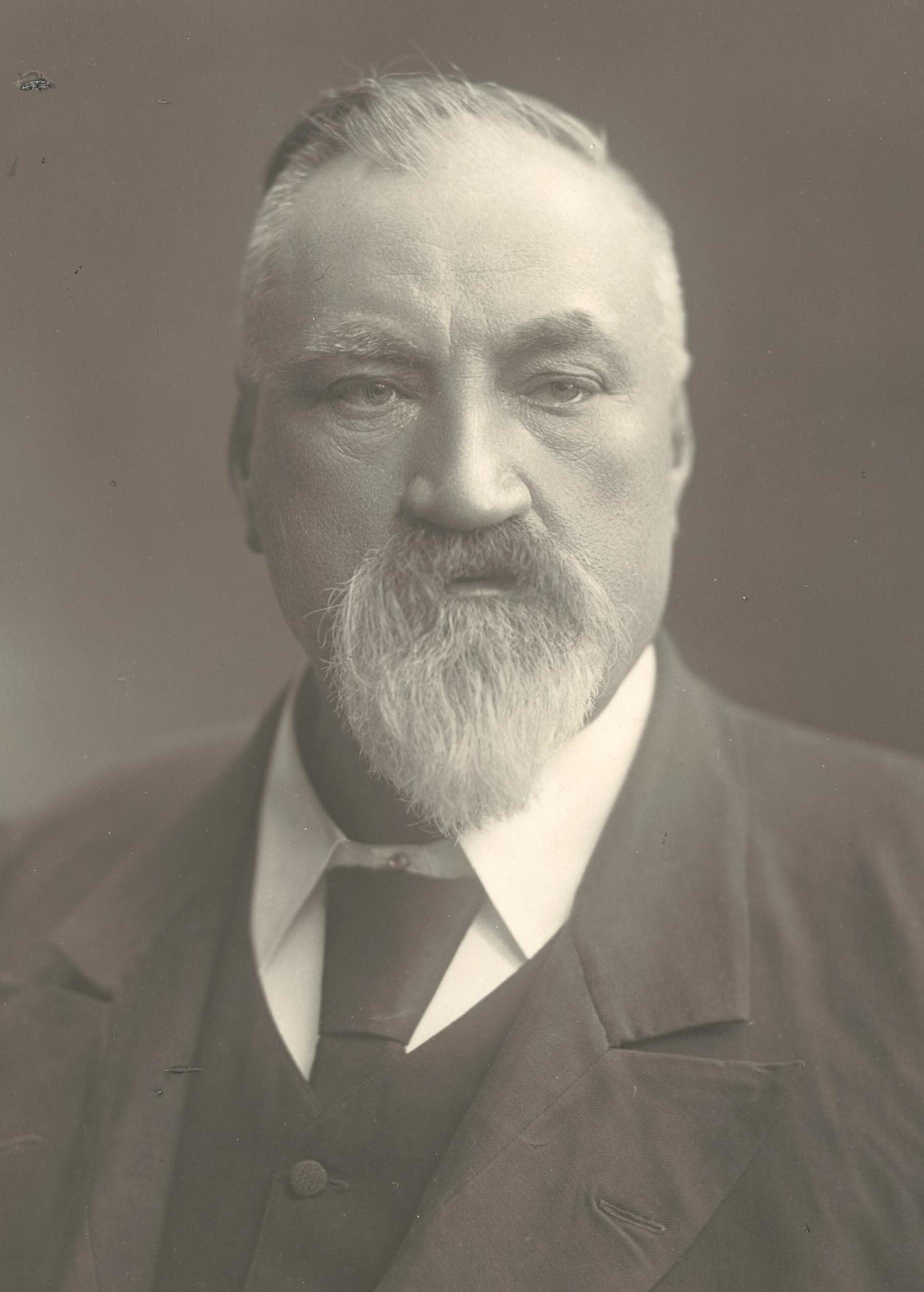
Thomas Playford II

- 11 January – James Wilkinson, Queensland politician (b. 1854)
- 11 March – Thomas Alexander Browne, author (born in the United Kingdom) (b. 1826)
- 4 April – Sir Francis Bathurst Suttor, New South Wales politician and pastoralist (b. 1839)
- 19 April – Thomas Playford II, 17th Premier of South Australia (born in the United Kingdom) (b. 1837)
- 25 April - William Henry Strahan, writer and soldier (b. 1869)
- 2 June – George Randell, Western Australian politician (born in the United Kingdom) (b. 1830)
- 25 June – Frederick Manson Bailey, botanist (born in the United Kingdom) (b. 1827)
- 28 June – Victor Trumper, cricketer (b. 1877)
- 18 July – George Marshall-Hall, composer and poet (born in the United Kingdom) (b. 1862)
- 2 August – Sir John Downer, 16th Premier of South Australia (b. 1843)
- 8 October – E. Phillips Fox, impressionist painter (b. 1865)
- 29 October – Richard Edwards, Queensland politician (born in the United Kingdom) (d. 1915)
- 20 November – Robert Barr Smith, businessman and philanthropist (born in the United Kingdom) (b. 1824)
- 4 December – George Richards, New South Wales politician (b. 1865)
- 21 December – Thomas Sergeant Hall, geologist and biologist (b. 1858)
