= 1913 in Australia =

- Decades: 1890s; 1900s; 1910s; 1920s; 1930s
- See also: 1913 in Australian literature; Other events of 1913; Federal election; Timeline of Australian history

The following lists events that happened during 1913 in Australia.

1913 in Australia
- Monarch: George V
- Governor-General: Thomas Denman, 3rd Baron Denman
- Prime minister: Andrew Fisher, then Joseph Cook
- Population: 4,820,172
- Elections: Federal, New South Wales, Tasmania

== Incumbents ==
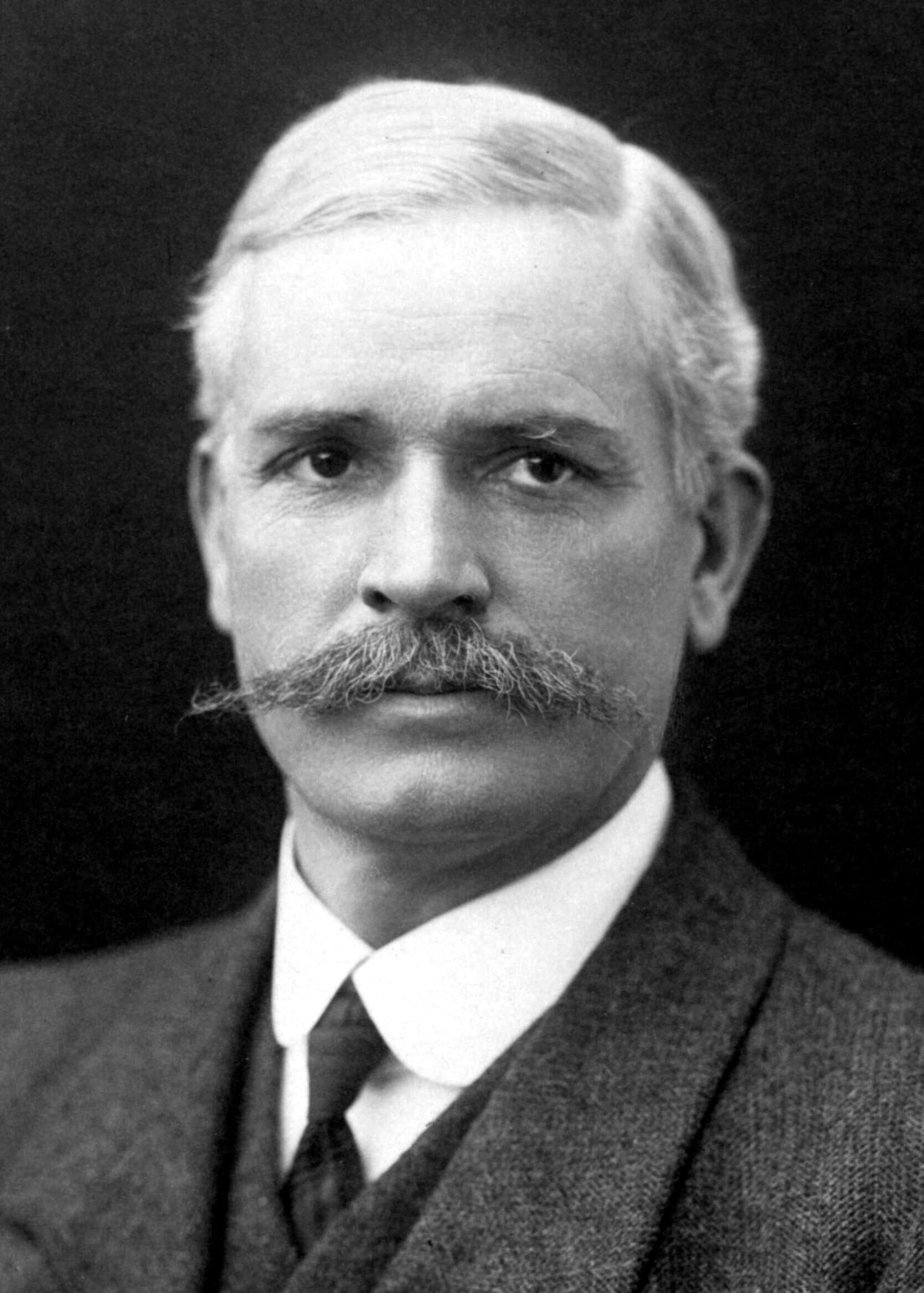
Andrew Fisher

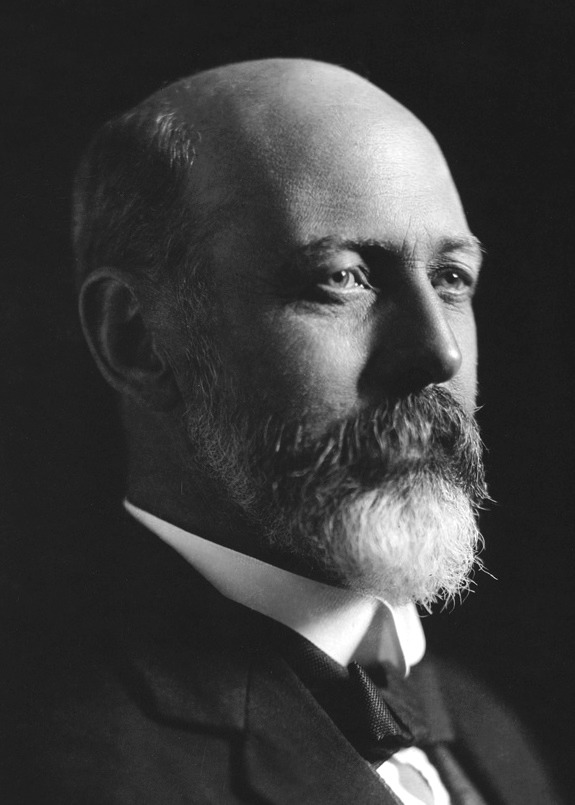
Joseph Cook

- Monarch – George V
- Governor-General – Thomas Denman, 3rd Baron Denman
- Prime Minister – Andrew Fisher (until 24 June), then Joseph Cook
- Chief Justice – Samuel Griffith

=== State premiers ===
- Premier of New South Wales – James McGowen (until 29 June), then William Holman
- Premier of Queensland – Digby Denham
- Premier of South Australia – Archibald Peake
- Premier of Tasmania – Albert Solomon
- Premier of Victoria – William Watt (until 9 December), then George Elmslie
- Premier of Western Australia – John Scaddan

=== State governors ===
- Governor of New South Wales – Frederic Thesiger, 3rd Baron Chelmsford (until 11 March), then Gerald Strickland (from 14 March)
- Governor of Queensland – William MacGregor
- Governor of South Australia – Day Bosanquet
- Governor of Tasmania – Harry Barron (until 10 March), then William Ellison-Macartney (from 4 June)
- Governor of Victoria – John Fuller
- Governor of Western Australia – Gerald Strickland (until 4 March), then Harry Barron (from 17 March)

== Events ==
- 2 January — Australian philately proper begins in early 1913 with the Kangaroo and Map series of stamps, featuring a kangaroo standing on a map of Australia, and inscribed "AUSTRALIA POSTAGE".
- 12 March — Canberra is named by Gertrude Denman
- 1 May — The first national banknotes were introduced in denominations of 10 shillings, and 1, 5, and 10 pounds.
- 31 May — 1913 Australian referendum contained six questions: Trade and Commerce, Corporations, Industrial Matters, Trusts, Monopolies, Railway Disputes. None of these were carried.
- 21 June — HMAS Australia, commissioned at Portsmouth and sailed to Australia to become the Royal Australian Navy flagship.
- 24 June — Joseph Cook becomes the 6th prime minister.
- 1 to 31 August — With an average rainfall of 0.24 millimetres or 0.0094 inches, this is the driest area-averaged month over Queensland since at least 1900.
- Royal Commission appointed to inquire into certain charges against Henry Chinn; Chinn was supervising engineer for the transcontinental railway in Western Australia.
- Royal Commission on Northern Territory railways and ports
- Royal Commission on powellised timber
- Golden Fleece Company acquired by Caltex in 1981
- The Workers' Educational Association founded; it is Australia's largest non-government adult community education organisation.
- From 1859 until 1913, a squadron of the Royal Navy was maintained in Australian waters.
- Norfolk Island Act 1913 meant that Norfolk Island became an Australia Territory under the authority of the Australian Commonwealth.

== Science and technology ==
- Amalgamation took place between Marconi's Wireless Telegraph Company and the Australian Wireless Company forming AWA.
- The first totalisator, an entirely mechanical system invented by the Australian George Julius of Julius Poole & Gibson, was installed at Ellerslie Racecourse in New Zealand.

== Arts and literature ==
'Inamorata melodie nuptiale for piano' 1913 by George De Cairos Rego (1858-1946)

== Film ==
- Moondyne
- Australia Calls, Raymond Longford's last film for Cozens Spencer was released.
- Frank Hurley's actuality film, The Home of the Blizzard, about the Douglas Mawson expedition to Antarctica, was released.

== Sport ==
- The 1913 VFL (now AFL) Premiership was won by Fitzroy
- The 1913 NSWRFL Premiership is won by Eastern Suburbs for the third year in a row.
- Posinatus wins the Melbourne Cup
- South Australia wins the 1912–13 Sheffield Shield
- The Australian cricket team toured the United States and Canada in June to August, playing five matches, four in Philadelphia and one in Toronto.

== Births ==
- 24 January – Ray Stehr, rugby league footballer (d. 1983)
- 10 February – Bill White, rugby union footballer (d. 1969)
- 11 February – Clyde Cameron, Whitlam government minister (d. 2008)
- 20 February – Dame Mary Durack, author and historian (d. 1994)
- 5 March – Darby Munro, jockey (d. 1966)
- 19 March – Smoky Dawson, country music performer (d. 2008)
- 3 April – William Refshauge, soldier and public health administrator (d. 2009)
- 4 April – Dave Brown, rugby league footballer (d. 1974)
- 20 June – David McNicol, public servant and diplomat (d. 2001)
- 1 July – Noel Miller, cricketer (d. 2007)
- 2 August – Nancy Phelan, writer (d. 2008)
- 14 August – Hector Crawford, Australian television producer (d. 1991)
- 6 September – Ken Kennedy, speed skater and ice hockey player (d. 1985)
- 2 October – Dame Roma Mitchell, 31st Governor of South Australia (d. 2000)
- 24 October – Ron Barassi Sr., Australian rules footballer (d. 1941)
- 30 October – Edgar Britt, jockey (d. 2017)
- 30 December – Elyne Mitchell, author (d. 2002)

== Deaths ==
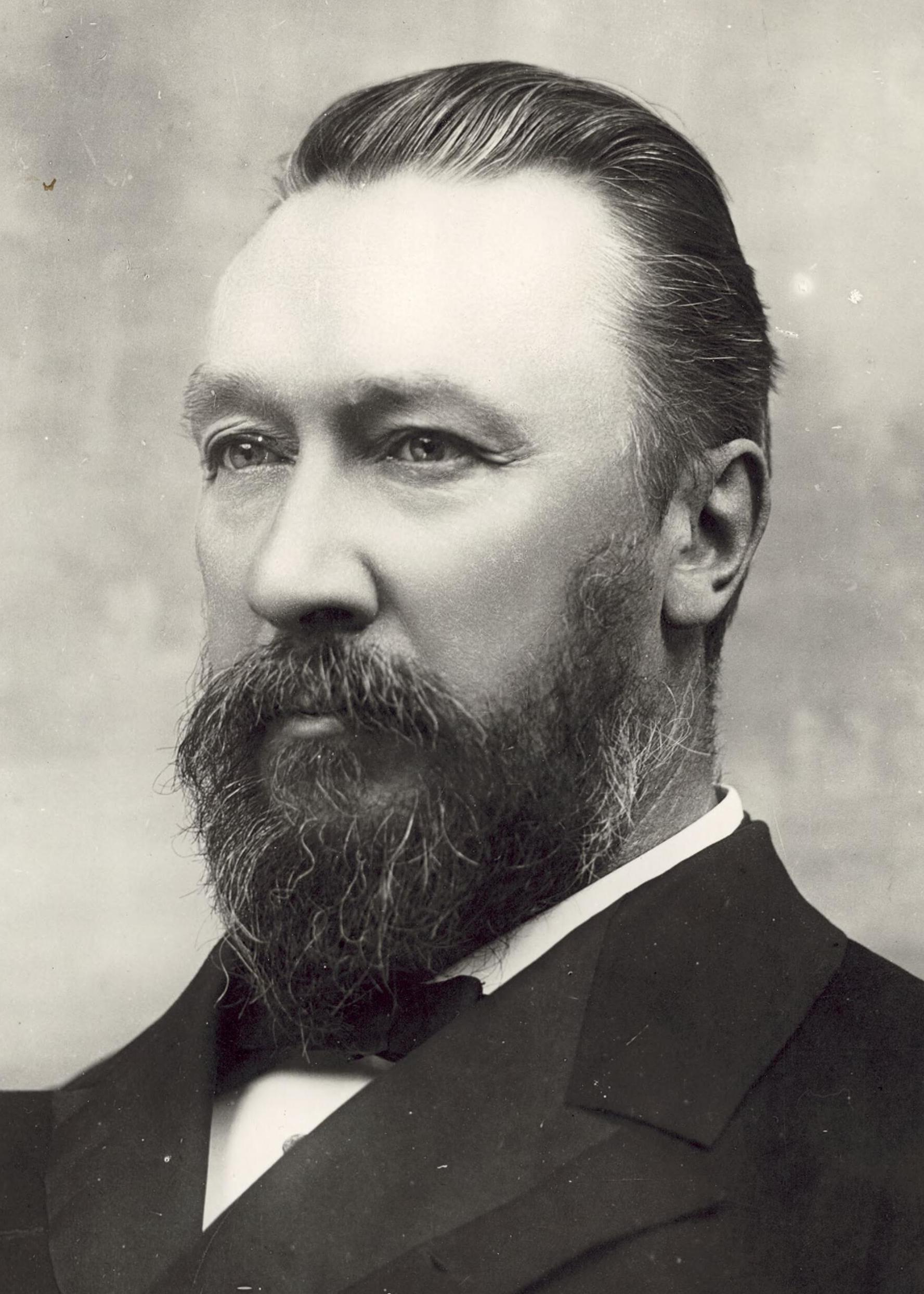
William Lyne

- 3 January – Garnet Walch, writer, journalist and publisher (b. 1843)
- 4 February – James Styles, Victorian politician (born in the United Kingdom) (b. 1841)
- 18 February – George Lewis Becke, trader and writer (b. 1855)
- 4 June – Ambrose Dyson, illustrator and political cartoonist (b. 1876)
- 6 July – J. C. Williamson, actor (born in the United States and died in France) (b. 1844)
- 20 July – Joseph Vardon, South Australian politician and printer (b. 1843)
- 3 August – William Lyne, 13th Premier of New South Wales (b. 1844)
- 25 August – William Knox, Victorian politician and businessman (died in the United Kingdom) (b. 1850)
- 12 November – Sir John George Davies, Tasmanian politician, newspaper proprietor and cricketer (b. 1846)
- 25 November – Charlie Frazer – Western Australian politician (b. 1880)

== See also ==
- List of Australian films of the 1910s
