= Don Benson =

Australian rules footballer (1920–2019)

Personal information
- Full name: Don Benson
- Born: 9 April 1920
- Died: 12 June 2019 (aged 99)
- Original team: Yallourn
- Height: 170 cm (5 ft 7 in)
- Weight: 73 kg (161 lb)

Playing career^{1}
Years	Club	Games (Goals)
1945	Richmond	3 (0)
- ^{1} Playing statistics correct to the end of 1945.

Don Benson (9 April 1920 – 12 June 2019) was an Australian rules footballer who played with Richmond in the Victorian Football League (VFL).

Benson played 110 games for Yallourn between 1937 and 1945, including their 1939 premiership.
