= Eric Joseph Wright =

Australian general practitioner, medical administrator (1912 – 1979)

Eric Joseph Wright (11 December 1912 – 21 December 1979) was an Australian general practitioner, medical administrator and public servant. Wright was born in St Leonards, Sydney, New South Wales and died in Lewisham, Sydney, New South Wales. After obtaining his education at Lewisham Public School he joined the department of public health as a medical assistant in 1930. Eric later established a school for medical assistants in Divinukoiari. Due to medical issues, Eric was unable to join the armed forces and instead studied medicine at the University of Sydney. Once Eric had furthered his education he returned to Papua and New Guinea where he then established a private practice. He would eventually marry his receptionist named Shirley May Chan Wong, née Hee. After accomplishing many other things in Papua and New Guinea Eric's health began to deteriorate so he returned to Sydney to be with his family. He was diagnosed with acute myocardial ischaemia and the disease later took his life on 21 December 1979 at Lewisham Hospital.
