= Kay Kinane =

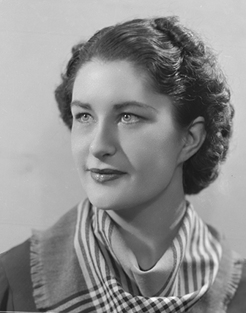
- Born: 11 July 1912; Perth, Western Australia Australia
- Died: 27 January 1998 (aged 85); Sydney, New South Wales, Australia
- Occupations: teacher, broadcaster
- Known for: producing educational radio and television content for the ABC
- Notable work: The Days of Good Queen Bess, The World We Live In
- Television: Woman's World

Kathleen "Kay" Kinane (11 July 1912 – 27 January 1998) was an Australian broadcaster, best known for producing educational content for radio and television.

== Early life ==
Kinane was born in Perth as the third child of six children to her parents who were active members of the Catholic community. They encouraged their children to pursue social and cultural activities.

Kinane had an interest in writing, theatre and debating. Upon her graduation from Loreto Convent in Claremont, she commenced studying an arts degree at the University of Western Australia before undertaking teacher training and then spending ten years teaching.

Kinane continued her university studies but she never completed her degree due to her refusal to complete what she considered a flawed philosophy curriculum.

== Career ==
By the late 1930s, Kinane had commenced producing and performing in radio plays for the ABC. In December 1943, the ABC recruited Kinane to become the schools broadcast officer for Western Australia, after which she was promoted to the state's supervisor of schools broadcasting. By 1947 she was producing 22 or more weekly programs for schools.

In 1947, Kinane transferred to the ABC's Sydney headquarters after she was promoted to the position of federal script editor of education, a position which saw Kinane became the most senior female producer and program officer at the ABC.

In 1948 she won a bursary and spent a year in England working at the BBC. While there, she visited displaced persons camps in Germany, collecting information that she used to create radio documentaries that were broadcast on her return to Australia.

Early in her career, she had challenged gender stereotypes by insisting the ABC use female narrators and recruited women into her department to work in senior roles. Kinane received mentorship from Rudi Bronner and together their teams consolidated the educational broadcasting policy for the ABC throughout the 1940s and 1950s.

Kinane became known for her dramatic approach to educational programming, producing hundred of radio program for both children and adults such as The Days of Good Queen Bess in 1948 and The World We Live In, a 12-part environmental series that Kinane produced in 1955. Kinane believed the ABC could contribute in improving educational standards including for those students in rural regions with limited resources. In 1953, Kinane drove across the Nullarbor Plain to record Australian sounds for the ABC's sound archive.

Following the arrival of television in Australia in 1956, Kinane extended her skills to become a principal advisor on the ABC's television policy helped by the fact that she had studied television in the United States in 1955. Kinane was the producer of the ABC's new program Woman's World where she used the opportunity to produce socially progressive content for Australian women.

Throughout the 1960s, Kinane continued her career progression. In 1963, Kinane was elevated to the position of assistant director of the ABC's education department before receiving another promotion in 1968 when she was appointed to being the federal supervisor of young people's programs.

== Retirement ==
By the mid-1970s, the media landscape had shifted away from traditional educational programming which prompted Kinane's decision to retire.

== Death ==
Kinane died in Sydney on 27 January 1998.
