= Mowla Bluff massacre =

Massacre in Western Australia

Coordinates: 18°42′24″S 123°41′35″E

The Mowla Bluff massacre was an incident involving the murder of a number of Indigenous Australians at Geegully Creek, near Mowla Bluff, in the Kimberley region of Western Australia in 1916.

Mowla Bluff is a cattle station 140 kilometres (87 mi) south of Derby and 75 kilometres (47 mi) southwest of Jarlmadangah. Responding to the brutality of the white station manager, some local men gave him a beating. In reprisal, an armed mob which included officials and residents rounded up a large number of Aboriginal men, women and children who were then shot. The bodies were burned.

A belated police investigation into the events took place in 1918, after two survivors were found with the bullets still within their bodies.

One account states that three or four hundred people were killed and only three survived.

In 2000 a memorial plaque was erected in Geegully Creek, Mowla Bluff, to commemorate the victims of the massacre.

A documentary film about the massacre, Whispering in our Hearts: The Mowla Bluff Massacre, was released in 2001.

== See also ==
- List of massacres in Australia
