= Alec Hill =

Australian historian

- Born: Alec Jeffrey Hill; 2 July 1916; Sydney, New South Wales
- Died: 27 August 2008 (aged 92)
- Awards: Member of the Order of the British Empire (1947); Australian Dictionary of Biography Medal (2004); Member of the Order of Australia (2006)

Academic background
- Education: University of Sydney; University of Oxford

Academic work
- Institutions: Royal Military College, Duntroon (1966–79)
- Notable students: David Horner; Peter Pedersen; Chris Coulthard-Clark; Brett Lodge
- Main interests: Australian military history Military biography
- Notable works: Chauvel of the Light Horse (1978)

Alec Jeffrey Hill AM, MBE, ED (2 July 1916 – 27 August 2008) was an Australian military historian and academic best known for his biography of General Sir Harry Chauvel and his work on the Australian Dictionary of Biography.

== Biography ==
Alec Jeffrey Hill was born in Sydney, New South Wales on 2 July 1916. His father, who served in the Great War, died while Alec was a boy. Alec was educated at Sydney Grammar, the University of Sydney and Balliol College, Oxford. He became a schoolteacher. He was commissioned in the New South Wales Scottish Regiment of the Militia in 1936.

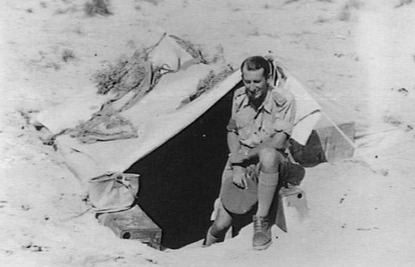
Captain Alec Hill outside his covered dugout (doover or dingus) at El Alamein. He described it as having "ants, beetles, an occasional scorpion and a mouse".

Hill joined the Second Australian Imperial Force (AIF) on the outbreak of the Second World War in 1939, receiving the service number NX380. He commanded a company of the 2/13th Infantry Battalion during the retreat to Tobruk in 1941, and in the subsequent Siege of Tobruk. He was a staff officer (GSO3) at 9th Division headquarters during the Second Battle of El Alamein. After the 9th Division returned to Australia, he fought in the New Guinea and Borneo campaigns as brigade major of the 20th Infantry Brigade. For his war service, he was made a Member of the Order of the British Empire in 1947.

After the war Hill returned to his old profession, teaching geography and history at his old school, Sydney Grammar, becoming senior history master. He was involved with the Australian Army Cadets and the Citizen Military Forces. He also served a term as Honorary aide de camp to the Governor of New South Wales. In 1966, he became a lecturer in history at the Royal Military College, Duntroon, which was then in transition to becoming a university faculty as part of the University of New South Wales. While there, he influenced a new generation of soldiers and military historians, including David Horner, Peter Pedersen, Chris Coulthard-Clark and Brett Lodge. He also produced Chauvel of the Light Horse, a biography of the General Sir Harry Chauvel, the commander of the Desert Mounted Corps in the Great War. First published in 1978, it is said to be the first modern scholarly biography of a senior Australian military figure. It advanced Australian military historiography "through the then unfashionable notion that generals were at least as important as privates in winning battles."

Hill was associated with the Australian Dictionary of Biography (ADB) for more than 30 years, becoming a member of its Armed Forces Working Party on its formation in 1974, and was its chairman from 1982 to 1994. He wrote 38 articles on such prominent generals as William Birdwood, Frank Berryman, Harry Chauvel, Harold Elliott, Leslie Morshead, Sydney Rowell, and George Wootten, in some cases drawing on his personal knowledge of the subject. For his work, he was awarded the ADB Medal in 2004. He was made a Member of the Order of Australia in the Australia Day honour's list in 2006 "for service to education in the field of Australian military history, to the Australian War Memorial as a writer and as a mentor to historians, and as a contributor to the Australian Dictionary of Biography." He died on 27 August 2008, survived by his wife, Patsy.

== Bibliography ==
=== Books ===
- Hill, Alec (1978). Chauvel of the Light Horse: A Biography of General Sir Harry Chauvel, GCMG, KCB. Carlton, Victoria: Melbourne University Press. ISBN 0522841465.
- Hill, Alec (1979). Japan, Military History and Foreign Affairs, 1870–1945. Duntroon, Australian Capital Territory: Reader Services Section, Bridges Library.
