= David Zeidler =

Australian chemist and industrialist

Sir David Zeidler AC CBE FAA FTSE
- Born: 18 March 1918; Melbourne, Australia
- Died: 12 March 1998 (aged 79); Melbourne, Australia

Sir David Ronald Zeidler (18 March 1918 – 12 March 1998) was an Australian chemist and industrialist.

== Biography ==
Zeidler was born in Melbourne, he attended the Scotch College, Melbourne and continued his education at the University of Melbourne graduating with a Master of Science. When he completed his studies Zeidler was employed by the Council for Scientific and Industrial Research (CSIR) from 1942 to 1952. He worked in the Division of Industrial Chemistry and became leader of the chemical engineering section. During this period he also traveled to the United States where he undertook postgraduate research at the Massachusetts Institute of Technology.

In 1952, he left the CSIR to work as a research manager of the chemical manufacturer Imperial Chemical Industries of Australia and New Zealand Limited (ICIANZ). He progressed through the management ranks of the company and became Executive Director in 1963 and finally served as Chairman and Managing Director at ICI Australia from 1973 to 1980. During Zeidler's time at the company he was actively involved in developing the companies capacity for research. He was also involved more widely in promoting research and encouraged cooperation between industry, research organisations and universities.

He was awarded a Commander of the Order of the British Empire for services to industry, science and education in 1971, a Knight Bachelor in 1979, and a Companion of the Order of Australia in 1990.

Following his retirement he served on company boards for large chemical companies and banks. He was a Fellow and President of the Australian Academy of Technological Sciences and Engineering and joined the Fellowship of the Australian Academy of Science by special election in 1985. ATSE awards a travel scholarship in his name. Zeidler Street in the Canberra suburb Gungahlin is also named in his honour.

== See also ==
- Orica
