= Dick Norris =

Australian entomologist

Kenneth Richard Norris (28 March 1914 – 14 July 2003) was an Australian entomologist.

== Early life and education ==
He was born in Geraldton, Western Australia. The family moved to Fremantle in 1922, which was to provide the opportunity for Dick and his younger brother Donald to pursue studies in agricultural science at the University of Western Australia (UWA). Don graduated in 1938, completed his MSc in 1944 and a doctorate in 1948. His thesis for the doctorate was entitled 'History, Bionomics, and Control of Pests of the Australian Pastoral Industry'.

== Career ==
He became a world authority on plant viruses, and chief research scientist with the Commonwealth Scientific and Industrial Research Organisation's (CSIRO) Division of Tropical Agronomy in Queensland.

He joined the CSIR – later to become the CSIRO – in 1937 as a temporary research officer for Western Australia. Ultimately he moved to Canberra and progressed to become assistant chief of the Division of Entomology in 1965. In recognition of his unique contributions he was honoured with the title of Associate Chief in 1977. During his long career he undertook pioneering research on serious pests such as the red-legged earth mite, buffalo fly, lucerne fly, cattle tick, clothes moth and the New Guinea screw-worm fly.

However, he was perhaps best known as a leading authority on Australian blowflies. He was often consulted by Australian police and health authorities over forensic matters, and appeared in an Australian Broadcasting Commission (ABC) documentary on the subject a few years ago.

== Retirement ==
After retirement in 1979 he continued as an honorary research fellow with the CSIRO well into his eighties. His last scientific publication was in 1999 at the age of 85. It exceeded 100 pages of original research and taxonomic drawings.

== Death ==
He died in Canberra, having outlived five siblings from the family of Leonard and Constance Norris (née Wright). His mother, who died in 1955, is still well known in Geraldton for her posthumously published historical reminiscences of the town.

Norris is survived by his wife of 69 years, and two sons, both scientists.
