= Sydney Edward Wright =

Australian academic and pharmacist (1914–1966)

Sydney Edward Wright (3 June 1914 – 7 October 1966) was an Australian academic, pacifist, pharmacist, pharmacy college head and technical/TAFE college teacher. He was born in Waverley, Sydney, New South Wales and died in Drummoyne, Sydney, New South Wales. He attended Sydney Boys High School from 1930 to 1931.

== See also ==
- Edwin John Davidson
