= Mac Wilson (footballer, born 1914) =

Australian rules footballer, born 1914

Personal information
- Full name: Andrew McDonald Wilson
- Born: 9 July 1914; Woori Yallock, Victoria
- Died: 9 August 2017 (aged 103)
- Original teams: Spotswood, Piangil, Woori Yallock, Sunshine
- Height: 170 cm (5 ft 7 in)
- Weight: 72 kg (159 lb)
- Position: Midfielder

Playing career^{1}
Years	Club	Games (Goals)
1943–44	Carlton	9 (0)
- ^{1} Playing statistics correct to the end of 1944.

Andrew McDonald "Mac" Wilson (9 July 1914 – 9 August 2017) was an Australian rules footballer who played with Carlton in the Victorian Football League (VFL). He was the second Carlton player to reach 100 years of age and was the oldest living person to have played in the VFL/AFL at the time of his death.
