= Keith Rae (British Army officer) =

British soldier

Major John Edward Keith Rae (28 May 1919 – 27 March 2010) was a British soldier. He fought in World War II. He was awarded the Military Cross for his exploits in the Second World War, which included escaping from occupied France.
