= William Jackson (Australian soldier) =

Australian Victoria Cross recipient (1897–1959)

William Jackson VC
- Studio portrait of William Jackson
- Born: 13 September 1897; Gunbar, New South Wales
- Died: 4 August 1959 (aged 61); Melbourne, Victoria
- Military career
- Allegiance: Australia
- Branch: Australian Army
- Service years: 1915–1917; 1941–1942
- Rank: Corporal
- Nickname: Bill
- Conflicts: First World War; Gallipoli Campaign; Battle of Hill 60; Western Front; Second World War
- Awards: Victoria Cross

John William Alexander Jackson, VC (13 September 1897 – 4 August 1959) was an Australian recipient of the Victoria Cross (VC), the highest award for gallantry in the face of the enemy that can be awarded to British and Commonwealth forces.

Jackson was awarded the Victoria Cross in 1916 for selfless courage under heavy fire while rescuing his comrades near Armentières in France during the First World War. Jackson is the youngest Australian to have been awarded a Victoria Cross. His was the first VC to be won by an Australian on the Western Front.

== Early life ==
John William Alexander Jackson was born on 13 September 1897 on "Glengower" station, near Gunbar. Known as William or Bill, he was the fourth child of John Gale Jackson and Adelaide Ann (née McFarlane). His mother died in 1905 and the six surviving children were raised by her parents at "Seaton Park" (a district property). William and his siblings attended the Gunbar School and William later found employment on local properties.

== First World War ==
On 15 February 1915, Jackson enlisted in the Australian Imperial Force in the first group of volunteers from Gunbar. In order to do so, with his father's approval, Jackson had raised his age by one year.

Placed in the 17th Battalion (5th Infantry Brigade) Jackson embarked for Egypt in May 1915 for initial training. On 20 August he was landed at Gallipoli and fought at Kaiakij Aghala (Hill 60). Six weeks later Jackson was hospitalised with severe dysentery. He recovered in a military hospital in Cairo and on 15 February 1916 rejoined his battalion only days before it embarked for France as part of the 2nd Division.

On 10 April Jackson's Division took over a forward position in the eastern Amentieres section of the Western Front. As a prelude to what became known as the Battle of the Somme, orders were issued for raids to be carried out on enemy positions between 20 and 30 June 1916.

On the night of 25 June, Jackson was acting as a scout for a party of forty soldiers, as they carried out an assault on the forward trenches of a Prussian infantry regiment, south-east of Bois Grenier (near Armentières). During the assault Jackson captured an enemy soldier and returned with him through no man's land. Prisoners were valued for the purpose of interrogation. On learning that some of his party had been hit in the intense shelling and gun-fire, Jackson returned to no man's land. He helped to bring in a wounded man, before going out again. While assisting Sergeant Camden to bring in the seriously wounded Private Robinson, a shell exploded nearby. The blast rendered Camden unconscious, blew off Jackson's right arm above the elbow and inflicted further wounds to Robinson.

Despite the loss of his arm, Jackson managed to return to his trenches, claiming he only felt "a numbing sensation". An officer applied a tourniquet to his arm, using a piece of string and a stick, and Jackson returned to no man's land for another half an hour until he was satisfied there were no wounded men left on the battlefield.

The hospital ship St. Patrick took Jackson from Boulogne to England where the remainder of his right arm was amputated. While recovering in an Australian military hospital near London, it was announced that Jackson had been awarded the Victoria Cross (VC) "for his great coolness and most conspicuous bravery while rescuing his wounded comrades while under heavy enemy fire". Approval of Jackson's VC was gazetted on 8 September 1916, five days prior to his nineteenth birthday.

Two weeks later, approval was gazetted of the award of the Distinguished Conduct Medal (DCM) to Private Jackson and to Sergeant Camden for their part in the rescue of wounded soldiers that night.

== Return to Australia ==
Jackson left England with a large group of repatriated servicemen aboard the Themistocles, and arrived in Sydney on 5 July 1917. At a reception in Sydney for the returned soldiers, held at the Anzac Buffet in the Domain, Jackson was hoisted shoulder-high and singled out for great honour. Accounts suggest that Jackson's private and reticent nature left him ill-prepared for the attention and adulation he received on his return to Australia.

Shortly afterwards Jackson travelled by train to Hay, accompanied by his comrade Sergeant Camden. They were met at the railway station by a large crowd who rushed "to get a sight of Private Jackson, and cheer after cheer was given for the returned hero". The two soldiers were officially welcomed in front of the Post Office. The Deputy Mayor spoke of Hay's reflected glory when reports stated that Jackson was from "Gunbar, near Hay". Camden replied on Jackson's behalf, and spoke of his comrade's selfless courage: "Bill was not looking for a VC that night, he was looking for a cobber". That evening Jackson and Sergeant Camden dined with local dignitaries at Tattersall's Hotel, on a table covered with the Union Jack and table-napkins folded in the form of military tents.

Gunbar had been experiencing hard times. A period of close settlement in the last decades of the previous century had ended, due to drought and the realities of farming marginal land. Businesses had closed and many of the original selectors and their descendants had left the district and the trend was towards larger holdings and fewer people. Despite this, Jackson was met with great celebration and pride on his return. The residents sought to show their appreciation of Jackson by buying him a farming property in the area, but he declined their offer, believing the loss of his arm rendered him incapable of work on the land.

Several years after Jackson's discharge in September 1917 the Army advised his father, John Jackson, that his son's DCM had been cancelled. In trying to rectify what seems to be a bureaucratic error the AIF asked John Jackson to return the official DCM award notification he had been sent. John Jackson claimed it was no longer in his possession. By this stage Jackson was living in Kensington, Sydney, close to members of his father's family.

== Later life ==
In the early 1920s Jackson moved to Merriwa in the New England area, where he became a dealer in skins. In 1927 he became the licensee of the Figtree Hotel near Wollongong for eighteen months. During the Depression years Jackson had several jobs, including managing a green-grocery business and working as a clerk in Sydney. William Jackson married Ivy Morris, a dressmaker, in January 1932 at Kogarah. They had one child, a daughter named Dorothea.

After enlisting during the Second World War Jackson was interrogated in December 1941 regarding his right to wear a DCM ribbon. He denied any knowledge that the award had been cancelled and replied that he would continue to wear all his medals. Jackson requested a discharge and indicated he would prefer to let the matter be decided in Court. The Army seems to have relented, probably on advice from the War Office in London, because Jackson re-enlisted less than three weeks after his discharge on 30 March 1942. He served as corporal in the 2nd Australian Labour Company until September 1942.

After 1946 Jackson again worked as a dealer in skins. He moved to Melbourne in 1953 and was appointed as a Commissionaire and Inquiry Attendant at the Melbourne Town Hall. In August 1953, at a civic reception for Sir William Slim, the Governor-General of Australia, the guest of honour noticed his lift-driver was wearing a VC ribbon, and spoke at length to Jackson, despite the waiting civic dignitaries.

During the 1954 Royal Tour of Australia, Jackson was given several honoured roles. In 1956 Jackson sailed to England for the Victoria Cross Centenary Celebrations. He became extremely ill on the voyage and spent six weeks in hospital, before being flown home.

Jackson continued as an employee of the Melbourne City Council until his death. Jackson died of heart disease on 5 August 1959 in the Repatriation General Hospital, Heidelberg. He was cremated at Springvale Cemetery with full military honours and his ashes placed in the Boronia Gardens.

On 28 May 2008, the Victoria Cross and campaign medals awarded to Private William Jackson, were sold privately to an Australian collector, whose identity has not been revealed. The price paid for the VC group is thought to be around A$650,000.
