= Jim Miller (Australian footballer, born 1919) =

Australian rules footballer (1919–2026)

Personal information
- Full name: James Henry Miller
- Born: 30 May 1919; Footscray, Victoria, Australia
- Died: 7 August 2026 (aged 107)
- Height: 169 cm (5 ft 7 in)
- Weight: 67 kg (148 lb)

Playing career
Years	Club	Games (Goals)
1938–1948	Footscray	131 (27)
1948–1949	Yarraville (VFA)	21 (41)

James Henry Miller (30 May 1919 – 7 August 2026) was an Australian rules footballer in the Victorian Football League (VFL).

== Biography ==
Miller was born in Melbourne suburb of Footscray and played in the Footscray District Football League until he was recruited by the Footscray Football Club. Miller made his debut for Footscray in 1938 and played 131 games for the club in the next 11 years. During World War II he served in both the army and the RAAF.

He left the VFL in 1948 to join Yarraville Football Club in the Victorian Football Association, where he was captain-coach. He retired from playing in 1949 due to a leg injury.

Miller was made a life member of the Footscray Football Club in 1947. He was a committee member of the club from 1957 and served as president between 1963 and 1966, when he did not stand for re-election, after previously serving as vice-president under Henry Dolphin.

Miller turned 100 in May 2019, and died on 7 August 2026, at the age of 107.

Mark Buttler and Steven Milne named Miller as one of Footscray's best 50 players in their 1994 book, Sons of the 'Scray: Footscray's Finest 50.
