= Keith Rae (footballer) =

Australian rules footballer (1917–2021)

Personal information
- Full name: Keith Stanley Rae
- Born: 30 July 1917; Williamstown, Victoria
- Died: 23 December 2021 (aged 104); Rosebud, Victoria
- Original teams: Williamstown, Carlton Juniors
- Height: 180 cm (5 ft 11 in)
- Weight: 70 kg (154 lb)
- Position: Midfielder

Playing career^{1}
Years	Club	Games (Goals)
1937–1939	Williamstown (VFA)	29 (31)
1939, 1943	Carlton	15 (2)
1946	Richmond	2 (1)
Total		46 (34)
- ^{1} Playing statistics correct to the end of 1946.

Career highlights
- • Richmond Second XVIII Premiership Team 1946

Keith Stanley Rae (30 July 1917 – 23 December 2021) was an Australian rules footballer who played with Carlton and Richmond in the Victorian Football League (VFL).

== Family ==
The son of Stanley Rae (1893-1968), and Ruby Adele Rae (1893-1983), née Pilling, Keith Stanley Rae was born at Williamstown, Victoria on 30 July 1917.

He married Joan McCarthy (1931-1984) on 14 April 1950.

== Education ==
He attended Footscray Technical School and did a welding course at the Williamstown Dockyards.

== Football ==
=== Williamstown (VFA) ===
Recruited from the Williamstown Seconds in 1937, he played three seasons for the Williamstown Football Club.

=== Carlton (VFL) ===
He was spotted by Carlton's recruiter Newton Chandler whilst playing for Williamstown, and was invited to try out for the Carlton team as a wingman or centre. After playing two games for Carlton in 1939, he joined the Navy.

=== Richmond (VFL) ===
He moved to Richmond in 1946, and played in two First XVIII games, scoring one goal, and in fourteen Second XVIII games, including the 1946 Second's Grand Final.

== Military service ==
During World War Two he served in the Royal Australian Navy. In June 1942, Rae was on board when HMAS Nestor was attacked and sunk in the Mediterranean. He survived, and returned to Australia in 1943.

== Cricket ==
He was also a talented junior cricketer.

== Oldest living former VFL footballer ==
Following the death of Ken Feltscheer in December 2017, Rae became the oldest living former VFL footballer.

== Death ==
Rae died at Rosebud, Victoria on 23 December 2021, at the age of 104.
