= Harry Barron =

British Australian state governor (1847–1921)

Major-General Sir Harry Barron KCMG CVO
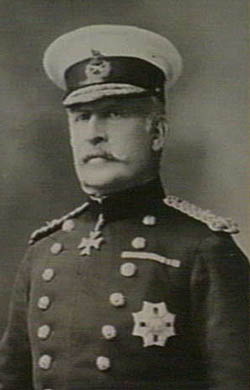

10th Governor of Tasmania
- In office 29 September 1909 – 9 March 1913
- Monarchs: Edward VII; George V
- Preceded by: Sir Gerald Strickland
- Succeeded by: Sir William Ellison-Macartney

16th Governor of Western Australia
- In office 17 March 1913 – 8 April 1917
- Monarch: George V
- Premier: John Scaddan (1913–16); Frank Wilson (1916–17)
- Preceded by: Sir Gerald Strickland
- Succeeded by: Sir William Ellison-Macartney

Personal details
- Born: 11 August 1847 Denmark Hill, Surrey, England
- Died: 27 March 1921 (aged 73) Weybridge, Surrey, England
- Spouse: Clara Emily Kelly

Military service
- Allegiance: United Kingdom
- Branch/service: British Army
- Years of service: 1867–1909
- Rank: Major-General
- Awards: Knight Commander of the Order of St Michael and St George; Commander of the Royal Victorian Order

Major-General Sir Harry Barron, KCMG, CVO (11 August 1847 – 27 March 1921) was a British Army officer who served as Governor of Tasmania from 1909 to 1913, and Governor of Western Australia from 1913 to 1917.

== Early life ==
Barron was born on 11 August 1847 to Elizabeth Pigeon, and Charles Barron of Denmark Hill in Surrey, England. He attended Stubbington House School, and then the Royal Military Academy. In 1877 he married Clara Emily, daughter of Major General T. Conyngham Kelly; they had one daughter Lilian Vaughan Barron, and a son Harry Montague Vaughan Barron who died in February 1909, aged 27, while a member of the Queen's Cameron Highlanders.

== Career ==
Barron was commissioned as lieutenant in 1867 at the Royal Artillery, and in 1879 he was promoted to captain. He worked at the School of Gunnery in Shoeburyness in 1897 before becoming the commander of the Thames district Royal Artillery from 1900 until 1904. At this time he was promoted to major general, and he became the commander of the Royal Artillery in Malta until 1908. He was made a Commander of the Royal Victorian Order in 1907. As part of the 1909 Birthday Honours, he was made a Knight Commander of the Order of St Michael and St George. He retired from the army in June 1909.

A few months after their son Harry died, Barron and Clara moved to Australia in August 1909, where Barron served as the Governor of Tasmania until 1913, and then as Governor of Western Australia from 1913 to 1917.

He retired to Weybridge Surrey, and in 1920, he was made colonel commandant of the Royal Artillery. He died on 27 March 1921. After he died, his wife continued to live in their Surrey Residence Swiss Cottage, however, there was a large mortgage on the property, and it was found that Barron had very little money as he had spent a large amount of his fortune while working as a governor, and he lost money on failed Russian investments. His wife Clara had to sell her furniture and possessions, and seek financial assistance from her friends and charities. After she sustained a spinal cord injury in 1930, and with her mortgage debt exceeding the value of her property she was unable to afford the daily assistance she required for her disability. She made failed applications to increase her pension from the war office, and get a pension for the governorships.

Government offices
Preceded by Sir Gerald Strickland	Governor of Tasmania; 1909–1913	Succeeded by Sir William Ellison-Macartney
Preceded by Sir Gerald Strickland	Governor of Western Australia; 1913–1917	Succeeded by Sir William Ellison-Macartney
