= Henry Galway =

British Army officer and Governor of South Australia

Lieutenant Colonel Sir Henry Galway KCMG, DSO
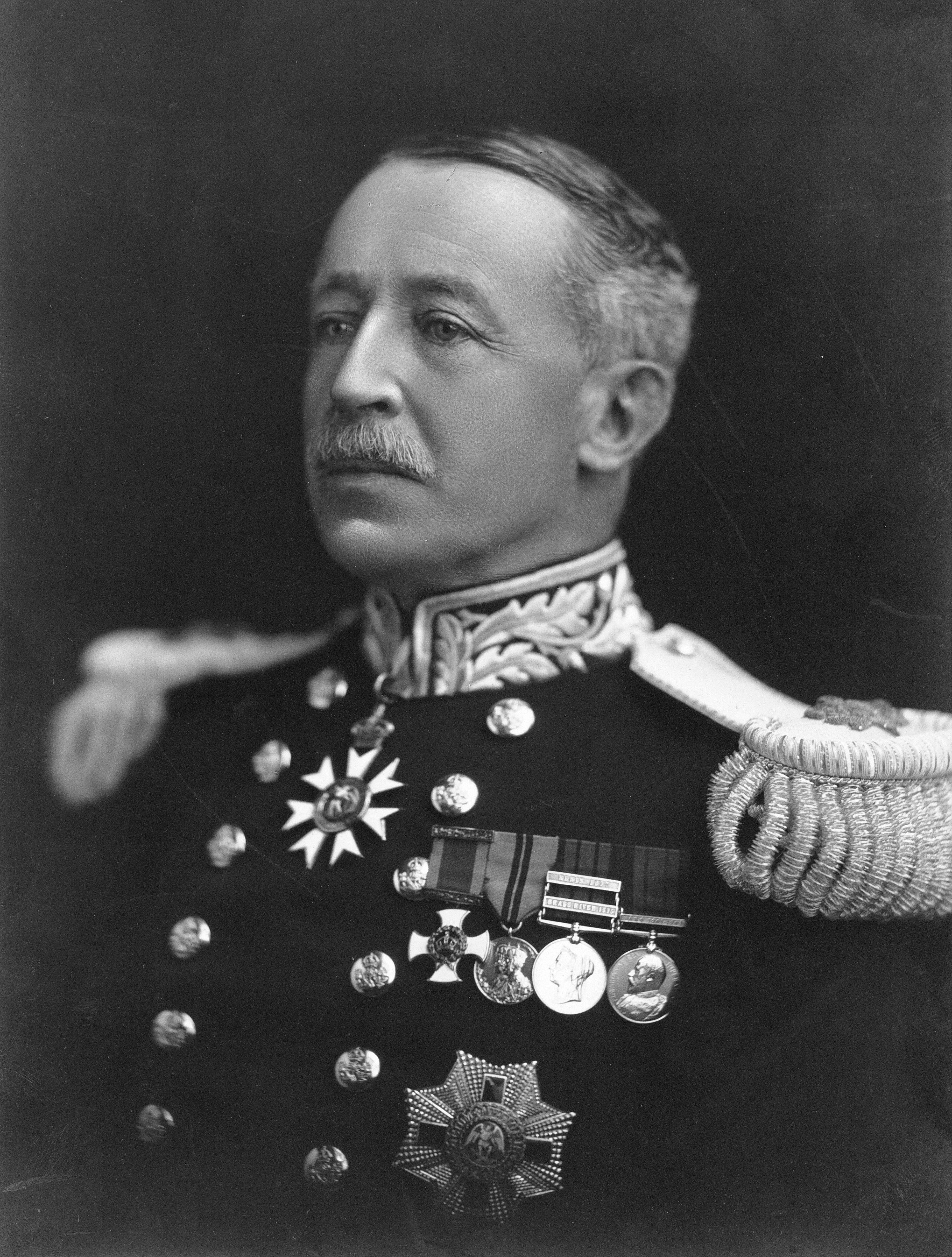
- Sir Henry Galway in 1919

17th Governor of South Australia
- In office 18 April 1914 – 30 April 1920
- Monarch: George V
- Premier: Archibald Peake (1914–1915); Crawford Vaughan (1915–1917); Archibald Peake (1917–1920); Henry Barwell (1920)
- Preceded by: Sir Day Bosanquet
- Succeeded by: Sir Archibald Weigall

Personal details
- Born: 25 September 1859
- Died: 17 June 1949 (aged 89)

Military service
- Allegiance: United Kingdom
- Branch/service: British Army
- Years of service: 1878–1902
- Rank: Lieutenant Colonel
- Battles/wars: Benin Expedition of 1897; Anglo-Aro War
- Awards: Knight Commander of the Order of St Michael and St George; Distinguished Service Order; Mentioned in Despatches

Lieutenant Colonel Sir Henry Lionel Galway, KCMG, DSO (25 September 1859 – 17 June 1949) was a British Army officer and served as the Governor of South Australia from 18 April 1914 to 30 April 1920. His name was Henry Lionel Gallwey until 1911.

== Early life ==
Henry Lionel Gallwey was born on 25 September 1859 at Alverstoke, Hampshire, England, to Lieutenant General Sir Thomas Lionel Gallwey and his second wife, Alicia Dorinda Lefanu, née MacDougall. He was educated at Cheltenham College.

== Military career ==
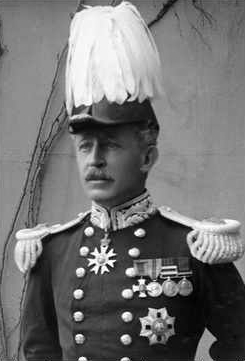
H. L. Gallwey c. 1900

After attending the Royal Military College, Sandhurst, Gallwey was commissioned in 1878. He served as an aide-de-camp to the governors of Bermuda, was promoted to captain in 1887.

Gallwey was appointed deputy commissioner and vice-consul in the newly established Oil Rivers Protectorate (later the Niger Coast Protectorate) in 1891. In March 1892, he convinced the Oba of Benin, Ovonramwen, into signing a 'treaty of friendship' that would make the Kingdom of Benin a British colony, however it is unclear as to whether Ovonramwen understood the treaty as doing so. Instead, the oba issued an edict barring all British officials and traders from entering Benin territories. The 'Gallwey Treaty', became the legal basis for the Benin Expedition of 1897, which overthrew the Kingdom of Benin. Captain Gallwey commanded one of the three columns of the expedition.

Gallwey was often mentioned in despatches during this time, and was rewarded with the Distinguished Service Order (DSO; 1896), appointment as Companion of the Order of St Michael and St George (CMG; 1899) and promotion to major (1897).

Gallwey was attached as a political officer to the staff of the British Field Force during the Aro-Anglo war from November 1901 until March 1902 and was mentioned in despatches by the High Commissioner to Southern Nigeria.

Given the rank of lieutenant colonel when he was placed on half-pay in 1901, Gallwey retired from the army in December 1902.

== Governorships ==
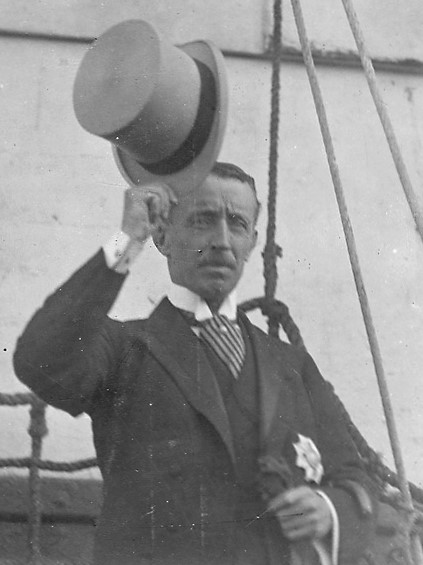
Newly appointed Governor Sir Henry Galway arriving at Outer Harbour in 1914

Gallwey was in November 1902 appointed as governor and commander-in-chief of the island of Saint Helena, where he revived capital punishment. Appointed Knight Commander of the Order of St Michael and St George (KCMG) in 1910, he was transferred to be governor of the Gambia in 1911.

Galway was appointed Governor of South Australia in 1914. He resented the limitations placed upon a constitutional governor, and his governorship was defined by controversy. He managed to anger a wide spectrum of the population. The general public disliked his support of compulsory military training; puritans were angered by his support for gambling and his opposition to prohibition; progressives were infuriated by his opposition to women's enfranchisement; and the political establishment were aghast at his opposition to the White Australia Policy (on the grounds that the Northern Territory needed Asian workers). For this last opinion, he was forced to issue a full retraction and apology. A speech in 1915 in which Galway suggested that trade unionists should be conscripted and sent to the front was widely criticised and gave local cartoonists a field day.

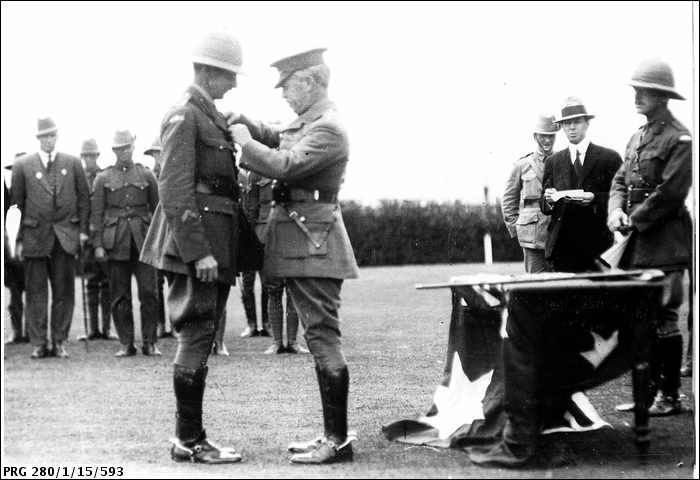
Stanley Price Weir (left foreground) receiving the Distinguished Service Order from the Governor of South Australia, Lieutenant-Colonel Sir Henry Lionel Galway, at Keswick Barracks on 15 January 1919

It was eventually Galway's support for conscription that saved his governorship; the legislature decided that his efforts to increase voluntary recruitment for the First World War, as well as his support for conscription referendums, warranted keeping him in the role. A motion in the legislature by the Labor opposition in 1917 calling for the abolition of his office failed.

After the war, Premier Archibald Peake was considering a proposal to build a national war memorial on the site of Government House, Adelaide, with a new vice-regal residence to be purchased in the suburbs. Galway managed to dissuade Peake from this scheme, and the war memorial was built in a corner of the grounds of Government House.

Galway's appointment was not renewed when it expired in 1920; although he was liked by the Adelaide establishment, he had been a spectacularly controversial governor, and the Colonial Office did not give him another post. He returned to England later in 1920.

== Personal life ==
In November 1911, Gallwey changed his surname to 'Galway'. On 26 August 1913 in London he married Baroness Marie Carola Franciska Roselyne d'Erlanger. He died on 17 June 1949 at the age of 89.

Government offices
Preceded by Robert Armitage Sterndale	Governor of Saint Helena; 1902–1911	Succeeded by Harry Cordeaux
Preceded by George Chardin Denton	Governor of The Gambia; 1911–1914	Succeeded by Edward John Cameron
Preceded by Sir Day Bosanquet	Governor of South Australia; 1914–1920	Succeeded by Sir Archibald Weigall
