= 1904 in Australia =

- Decades: 1880s; 1890s; 1900s; 1910s; 1920s
- See also: Other events of 1904; Timeline of Australian history

The following lists events that happened during 1904 in Australia.

1904 in Australia
- Monarch: Edward VII
- Governor-General: Hallam Tennyson, 2nd Baron Tennyson, then Henry Northcote, 1st Baron Northcote
- Prime minister: Alfred Deakin, Chris Watson, George Reid
- Population: 3,941,208
- Elections: Victoria, New South Wales, Queensland, Western Australia

== Incumbents ==
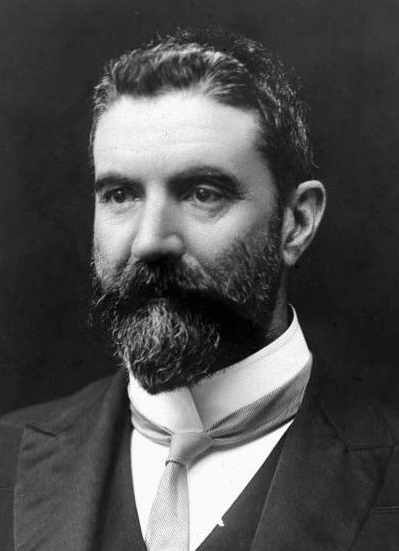
Alfred Deakin

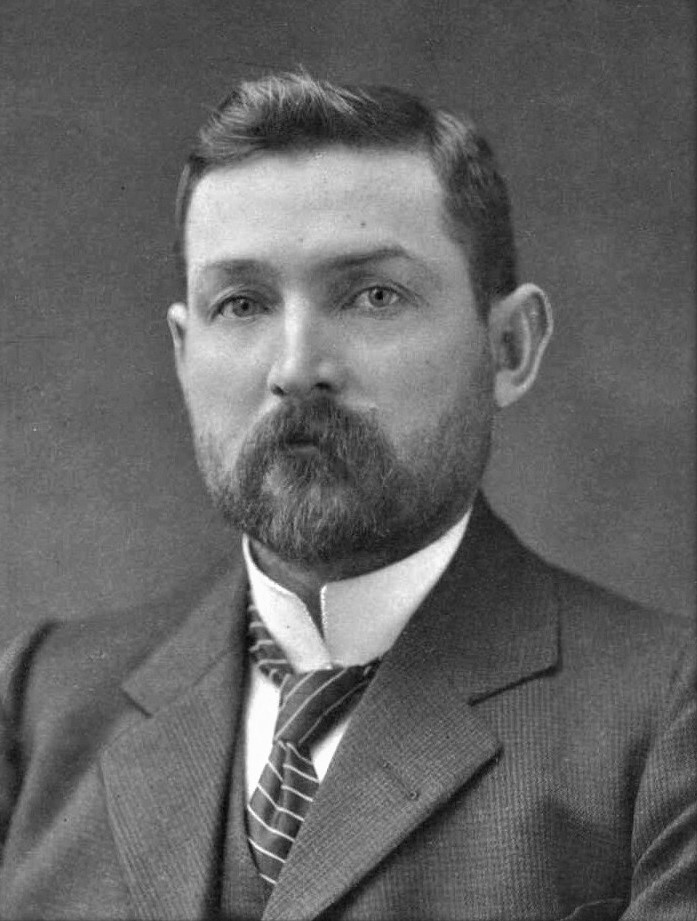
Chris Watson

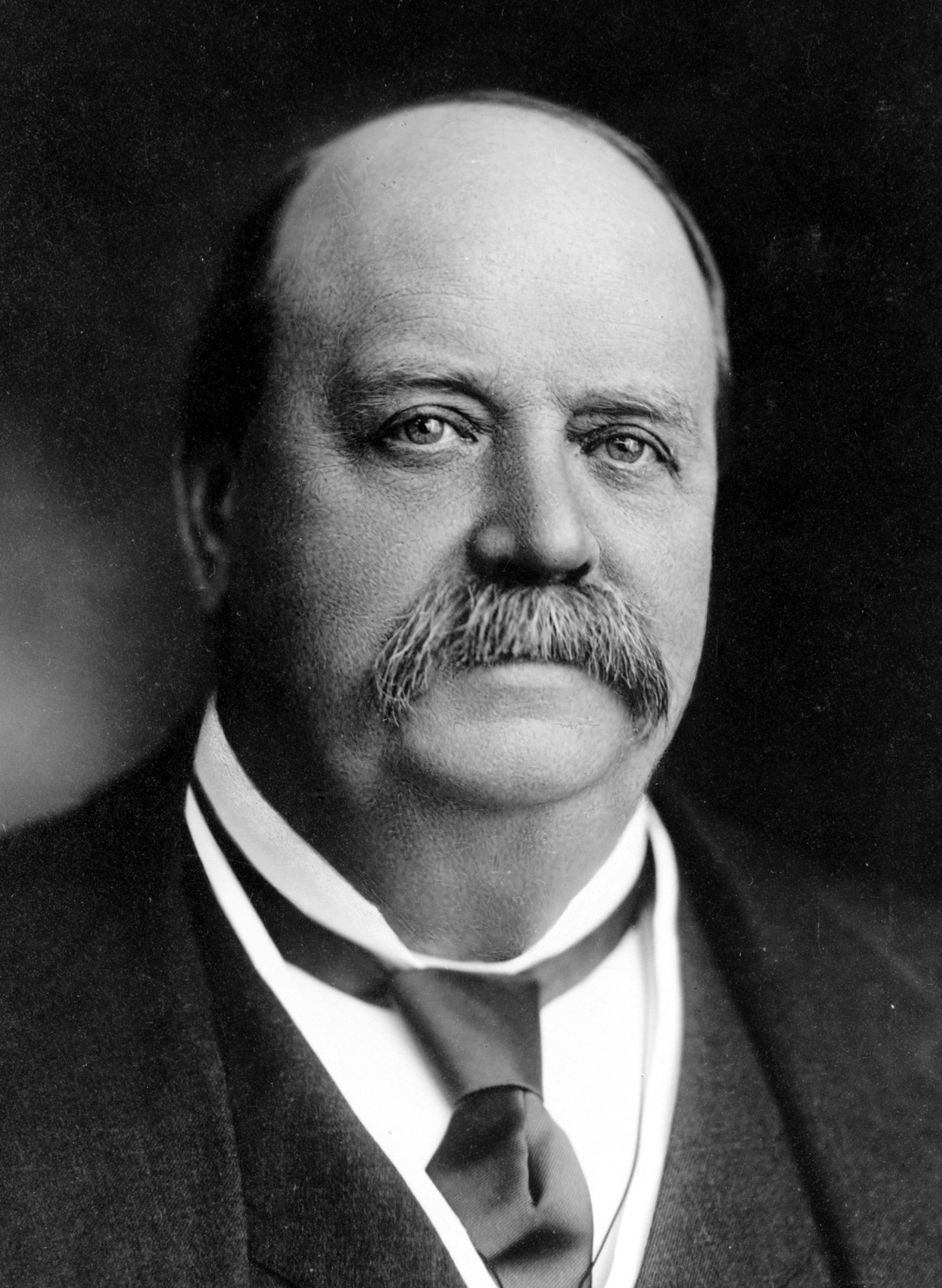
George Reid

- Monarch – Edward VII
- Governor-General – Hallam Tennyson, 2nd Baron Tennyson (until 21 January), then Henry Northcote, 1st Baron Northcote
- Prime Minister – Alfred Deakin (until 27 April), Chris Watson (until 18 August), then George Reid
- Chief Justice – Samuel Griffith

=== State premiers ===
- Premier of New South Wales – John See (until 14 June), Thomas Waddell (until 29 August), then Joseph Carruthers
- Premier of South Australia – John Jenkins
- Premier of Queensland – Arthur Morgan
- Premier of Tasmania – William Propsting (until 12 July), then John Evans
- Premier of Western Australia – Walter James (until 10 August), then Henry Daglish
- Premier of Victoria – William Irvine (until 16 February), then Sir Thomas Bent

=== State governors ===
- Governor of New South Wales – Sir Harry Rawson
- Governor of South Australia – Sir George Ruthven Le Hunte
- Governor of Queensland – Sir Herbert Chermside (until 10 October)
- Governor of Tasmania – Captain Sir Arthur Havelock (until 16 April), then Sir Gerald Strickland (from 28 October)
- Governor of Western Australia – Admiral Sir Frederick Bedford
- Governor of Victoria – Major General Sir Reginald Talbot (from 25 April)

== Events ==
- 6 January – The Tasmanian government replaces the state's Central Board of Health with a Public Health Department.
- 13 January – The flag of South Australia is officially gazetted as the current design.
- 23 January – A by-election is held for the New South Wales Legislative Assembly seat of Ryde. It is won by Edward Terry for the Liberal Reform Party.
- 29 February – Women's suffrage is granted in Tasmania.
- 1 June – A general election is held in Victoria. Incumbent premier Sir Thomas Bent is returned with an increased majority.
- 20 June – The P&O ship SS Australia is wrecked at the entrance to Port Phillip. There is no loss of life.
- 18 August – Chris Watson resigns as the first Labor prime minister and is succeeded by George Reid of the Free Trade Party.
- 12 November – John Drayton is imprisoned under parliamentary privilege provisions in Western Australia.
- 1 December – Ipswich, Queensland is proclaimed as a city.

== Arts and literature ==
- 12 January – Melbourne businessman Alfred Felton leaves a large bequest to the Art Gallery of Victoria.
- Hans Heysen wins the Wynne Prize with Mystic Morn
- The Austral Hall Toowoomba was officially opened on 5 November 1904 by Sir Hugh Nelson, Lieutenant Governor of Queensland for The Austral Society.

== Sport ==
- September – The Australasian Lawn Tennis Association is formed in Sydney.
- 1 November – Acrasia wins the Melbourne Cup.
- New South Wales wins the Sheffield Shield.
- Two Australians, Corrie Gardner and Leslie McPherson, compete in athletics at the 1904 Summer Olympics. They do not return with any medals

== Births ==
- 7 April – Sir Roland Wilson, public servant and economist (d. 1996)
- 8 April – John Antill, composer (d. 1986)
- 29 May – Sir Hubert Opperman, Victorian politician and cyclist (d. 1996)

== Deaths ==
- 8 January – Alfred Felton, entrepreneur, art collector and philanthropist (born in the United Kingdom) (b. 1831)
- 25 January – Sir Graham Berry, 11th Premier of Victoria (born in the United Kingdom) (b. 1822)
- 2 February – Sir Edward Braddon, 18th Premier of Tasmania (born in the United Kingdom) (b. 1829)
- 12 April – George Cruickshank, New South Wales politician (b. 1853)
- 12 May – Robert Reid, Victorian politician (born and died in the United Kingdom) (b. 1842)
- 5 August – Sir George Dibbs, 10th Premier of New South Wales (b. 1834)
- 17 December – William Shiels, 16th Premier of Victoria (born in Ireland) (b. 1848)

== See also ==
- 1904
- 1900–1909
