= 1906 in Australia =

- Decades: 1880s; 1890s; 1900s; 1910s; 1920s
- See also: Other events of 1906; Timeline of Australian history

The following lists events that happened during 1906 in Australia.

1906 in Australia
- Monarch: Edward VII
- Governor-General: Henry Northcote, 1st Baron Northcote
- Prime minister: Alfred Deakin
- Population: 4,059,083
- Elections: Federal, South Australia, Tasmania

== Incumbents ==
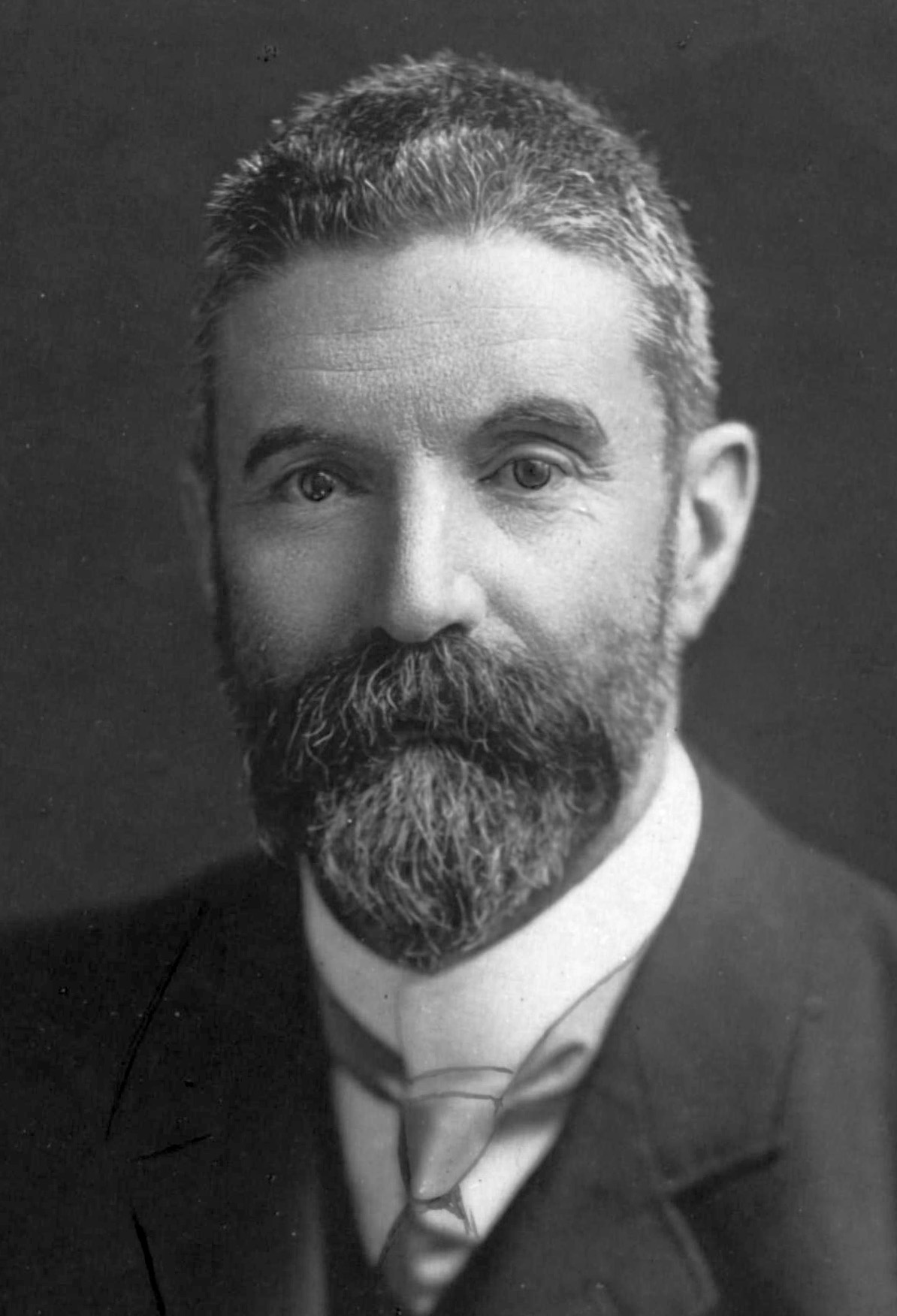
Alfred Deakin

- Monarch – Edward VII
- Governor General – Henry Northcote, 1st Baron Northcote
- Prime Minister – Alfred Deakin
- Chief Justice – Samuel Griffith

=== State premiers ===
- Premier of New South Wales – Joseph Carruthers
- Premier of South Australia – Thomas Price
- Premier of Queensland – Arthur Morgan (to 19 January), then William Kidston
- Premier of Tasmania – John Evans
- Premier of Western Australia – Cornthwaite Rason (to 7 May), then Newton Moore
- Premier of Victoria – Thomas Bent

=== State governors ===
- Governor of New South Wales – Sir Harry Rawson
- Governor of South Australia – Sir George Ruthven Le Hunte
- Governor of Queensland – Frederic Thesiger, 3rd Baron Chelmsford (from 30 November)
- Governor of Tasmania – Sir Gerald Strickland
- Governor of Western Australia – Admiral Sir Frederick Bedford
- Governor of Victoria – Major General Sir Reginald Talbot

== Events ==
- 27 January – A cyclone damages Cairns and Innisfail in Queensland.
- 6 February – The world's first surf lifesaving club is formed at Bondi Beach.
- 5 May – The first electric trams begin running in Melbourne from St Kilda to Brighton.
- 16 June – The town of Roma, Queensland becomes the first town in Australia to be lit and powered by natural gas, however the gas reserve only lasts ten days.
- 16 July – The Australian Army Cadet Corps is formed.
- 1 September – Control of British New Guinea is formally transferred to Australia from Britain.
- 12 December – 1906 Australian federal election: The government of Prime Minister Alfred Deakin is returned to power, however voter turn-out is low.

== Science and technology ==
- 12 July – The first wireless radio transmission is made from the Australian mainland between Point Lonsdale, Victoria and Devonport, Tasmania.

== Film ==
- 26 December – The national premiere of The Story of the Kelly Gang, generally regarded as the world's first feature length film, takes place at the Athenaeum Hall in Melbourne.

== Sport ==
- 26 January – New South Wales wins the Sheffield Shield.
- 26 April – 2 May – The 1906 Intercalated Games are held in Athens, Greece – Australia wins three bronze medals.
- 22 September – Carlton wins the VFL grand final, beating Fitzroy 15.4 (94) to 6.9 (45).
- 6 November – Poseidon wins the Melbourne Cup.

== Births ==
- 19 January – Rachel Cleland, community worker (died 2002)
- 5 February – Alexander Spence, soldier (died 1983)
- 16 May – Ernie McCormick, cricketer (died 1991)
- 27 May – Raymond Ferrall, businessman, author and cricketer (died 2000)
- 9 July – Roy Leaper, Australian rules footballer (died 2002)
- 14 July – Stan Devenish Meares, obstetrician and gynaecologist (died 1994)
- 17 July – Dunc Gray, Olympic cyclist (died 1996)
- 12 August – Harry Hopman, tennis player and coach (died 1985)
- 22 August – Lotus Thompson, silent film actress (died 1963)
- 31 August – Edwin Sherbon Hills, geologist (died 1986)
- 2 October – Thomas Hollway, Premier of Victoria (died 1971)
- 21 November – Tom Clarke, VFL footballer for Essendon (died 1981)
- 30 November – Mabel Miller, lawyer and politician (died 1978)
- 3 December – Frank Packer, media proprietor and father of Kerry Packer (died 1974)
- 9 December – Douglas Nicholls, Aboriginal pastor and Governor of South Australia (died 1988)
- 22 December – Clive Turnbull, Tasmanian author and journalist (died 1975)

== Deaths ==
- 1 January – Sir Hugh Nelson, 11th Premier of Queensland (born in the United Kingdom) (b. 1833)
- 4 January – Jessie Rooke, suffragette and temperance reformer (born in the United Kingdom) (b. 1845)
- 14 January – Henry Yelverton, Western Australian politician (b. 1854)
- 6 February – James Bonwick, writer (born and died in the United Kingdom) (b. 1817)
- 5 March – Hugh Ramsay, artist (born in the United Kingdom) (b. 1877)
- 7 March – Frederick William Haddon, journalist (born in the United Kingdom) (b. 1839)
- 14 March – George Coppin, Victorian politician, actor and entrepreneur (born in the United Kingdom) (b. 1819)
- 21 March – Thomas Macdonald-Paterson, Queensland politician (born in the United Kingdom) (b. 1844)
- 30 March – John Ferguson, Queensland politician (born in the United Kingdom) (b. 1830)
- 10 April – Sir Adye Douglas, 15th Premier of Tasmania (born in the United Kingdom) (b. 1815)
- 16 April – William Farrer, agronomist (born in the United Kingdom) (b. 1845)
- 6 August – George Waterhouse, 6th Premier of South Australia and 7th Premier of New Zealand (born and died in the United Kingdom) (b. 1824)
- 8 August – William Purkiss, Western Australian politician (b. 1844)
- 3 September – Sir Samuel Davenport, South Australian politician (born in the United Kingdom) (b. 1818)
- 31 October – Charles Troedel, printer (born in Germany) (b. 1836)
- 22 November – Henry Brand, 2nd Viscount Hampden, 19th Governor of New South Wales (born and died in the United Kingdom) (b. 1841)

== See also ==
- List of Australian films before 1910
