= 1905 in Australia =

- Decades: 1880s; 1890s; 1900s; 1910s; 1920s
- See also: Other events of 1905; Timeline of Australian history

The following lists events that happened during 1905 in Australia.

1905 in Australia
- Monarch: Edward VII
- Governor-General: Henry Northcote, 1st Baron Northcote
- Prime minister: George Reid, then Alfred Deakin
- Population: 3,999,074
- Elections: South Australia, Western Australia

== Incumbents ==
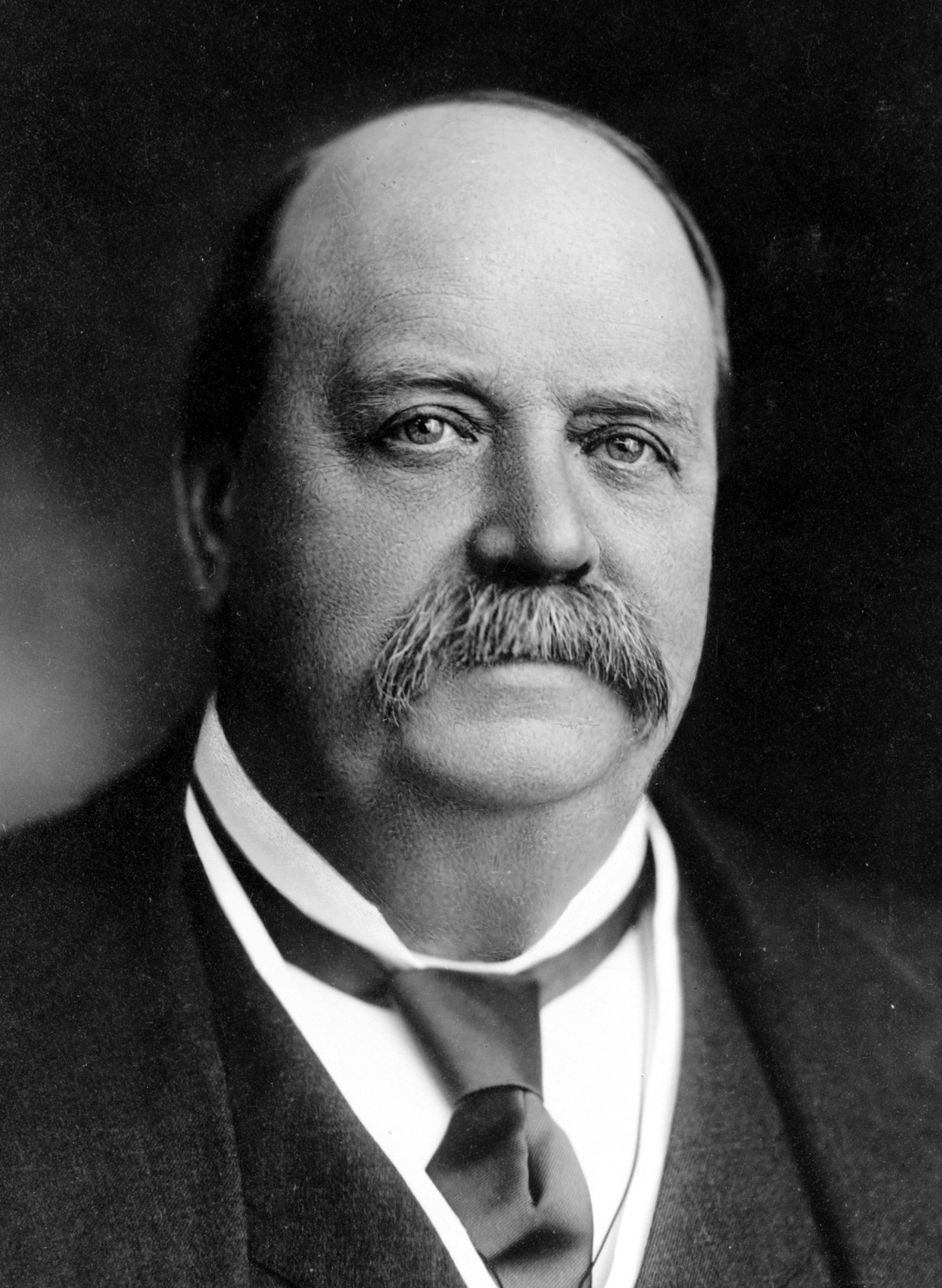
George Reid

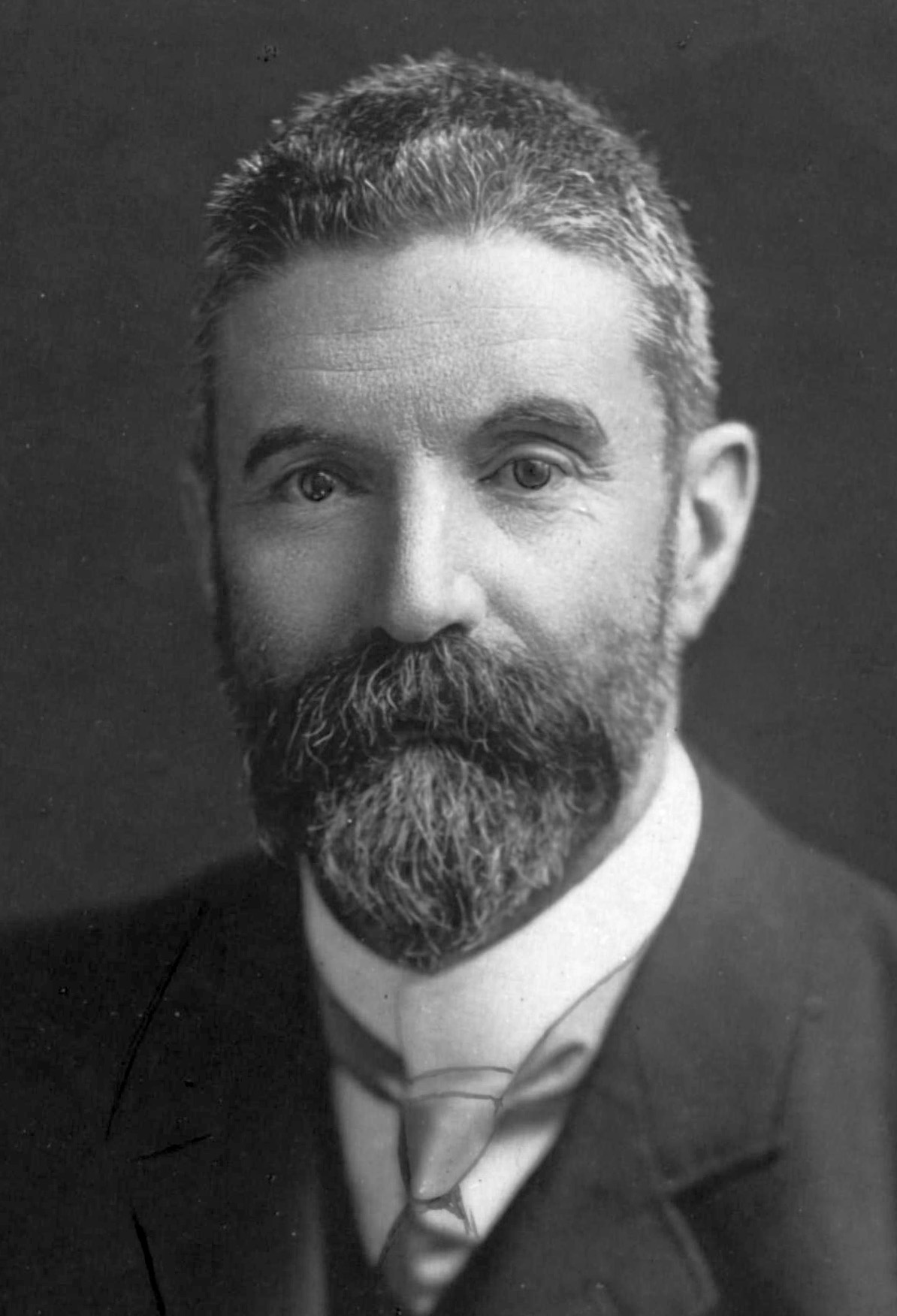
Alfred Deakin

- Monarch – Edward VII
- Governor-General – Hallam Tennyson, 2nd Baron Tennyson (until 21 January), then Henry Northcote, 1st Baron Northcote
- Prime Minister – George Reid (until 5 July), then Alfred Deakin
- Chief Justice – Samuel Griffith

=== State premiers ===
- Premier of New South Wales – Joseph Carruthers
- Premier of South Australia – John Jenkins (until 1 March), then Richard Butler (until 26 July), then Thomas Price
- Premier of Queensland – Arthur Morgan
- Premier of Tasmania – John Evans
- Premier of Western Australia – Henry Daglish (until 25 August), then Cornthwaite Rason
- Premier of Victoria – Thomas Bent

=== State governors ===
- Governor of New South Wales – Admiral Sir Harry Rawson
- Governor of South Australia – Sir George Ruvthen Le Hunt
- Governor of Queensland – Frederic Thesiger, 3rd Baron Chelmsford (from 30 November)
- Governor of Tasmania – Sir Gerald Strickland
- Governor of Western Australia – Admiral Sir Frederick Bedford
- Governor of Victoria – Major General Sir Reginald Talbot

== Events ==
- 1 March – John Jenkins resigns as Premier of South Australia to become Agent-General for South Australia in London. He is replaced by Richard Butler.
- 12 May – The first meeting of the Australian Council of Defence takes place between the Minister for Defence, the Treasurer, the Inspector-General Army, the Chief of Intelligence, and the Director of the Naval Forces.
- 18 May – A state election takes place in Queensland, returning the government of Arthur Morgan. Women are able to vote in Queensland state elections for the first time.
- 24 May – Empire Day is first celebrated in Australia.
- 28 May – The town of Maryborough in Queensland experiences an outbreak of pneumonic plague.
- 5 July – Alfred Deakin resumes office as Prime Minister of Australia after George Reid is unable to form a stable ministry.
- 26 July – A state election is held in South Australia. The Labor Party led by Thomas Price forms a minority government.
- 6 September – Last sighting of the clipper ship Loch Vennachar which sinks off Kangaroo Island, killing 32 people. Only one body was found.
- unknown dates
  - Non-aboriginal women are given the vote and admitted to the practice of law in Queensland.
  - Workers' compensation is introduced in Queensland.

== Arts and literature ==
- Albert J. Hanson wins the Wynne Prize with The Blue Noon

== Sport ==
- 1 February – New South Wales wins the Sheffield Shield
- 15 July – Australia first competes in the Davis Cup, in a combined Australasian team with New Zealand.
- 30 September – Fitzroy wins the VFL premiership.
- 7 November – Blue Spec wins the Melbourne Cup.
- Australia loses cricket series to England 0–2

== Births ==
- 10 January - Albert Arlen, pianist, composer, actor, and playwright (died 1993)
- 15 February – Heathcote Howard Hammer, brigadier (died 1961)
- 1 April – Paul Hasluck, Governor General of Australia (died 1993)
- 11 July – Betty Allan, statistician and biometrician (died 1952)
- 1 August – Eddie Gilbert, cricketer (died 1978)
- 2 November – Allan Walters, air vice-marshal (died 1968)
- 18 December – Roy Grounds, architect (died 1981)

== Deaths ==
- 15 January – George Thorn (born 1838), Premier of Queensland
- 6 May – Robert Herbert (born 1831), Premier of Queensland
- 25 June – Augustus Gregory (born 1819), explorer
- 5 July – Henry Baylis (born 1826), police magistrate
- 30 October – Boyd Dunlop Morehead (born 1843), Premier of Queensland
- 29 December – Victor Daley (born 1858), poet

== See also ==
- 1900s (decade)
