= 1903 in Australia =

- Decades: 1880s; 1890s; 1900s; 1910s; 1920s
- See also: Other events of 1903; Timeline of Australian history

The following lists events that happened during 1903 in Australia.

1903 in Australia
- Monarch: Edward VII
- Governor-General: John Hope, then Hallam Tennyson, 2nd Baron Tennyson
- Prime minister: Edmund Barton, then Alfred Deakin
- Population: 3,891,519
- Elections: Federal, Tasmania

== Incumbents ==
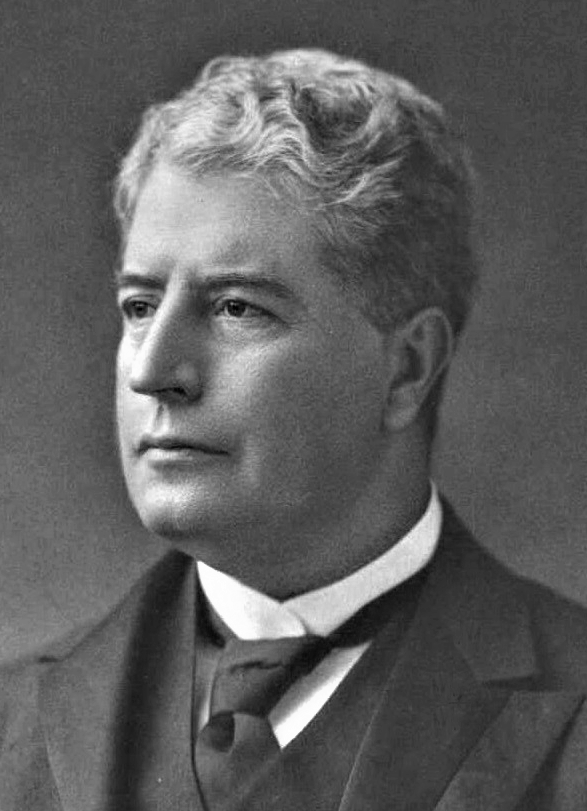
Edmund Barton

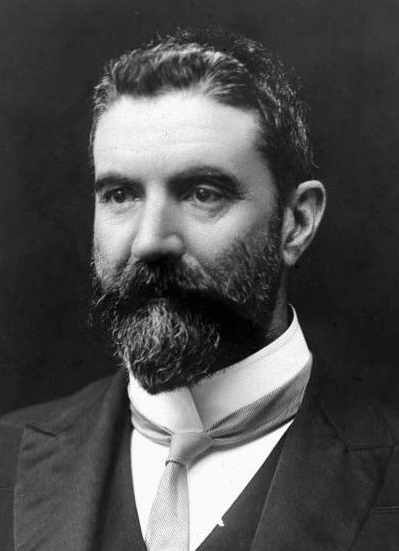
Alfred Deakin

- Monarch – Edward VII
- Governor General – John Hope, 7th Earl of Hopetoun (until 29 January), then Hallam Tennyson, 2nd Baron Tennyson
- Prime Minister – Edmund Barton (until 24 September), then Alfred Deakin
- Chief Justice – Samuel Griffith (from 5 October)

=== State premiers ===
- Premier of New South Wales – John See
- Premier of Queensland – Robert Philp (until 17 September), then Arthur Morgan
- Premier of South Australia – John Jenkins
- Premier of Tasmania – Elliott Lewis (until 9 April), then William Propsting
- Premier of Western Australia – Walter James
- Premier of Victoria – William Irvine

=== State governors ===
- Governor of New South Wales – Admiral Sir Harry Rawson
- Governor of Queensland – Major General Sir Herbert Chermside
- Governor of South Australia – Hallam Tennyson, 2nd Baron Tennyson (until 17 July)
- Governor of Tasmania – Captain Sir Arthur Havelock
- Governor of Western Australia – Admiral Sir Frederick Bedford (from 24 March)
- Governor of Victoria – Sir George Clarke (until 24 November)

== Events ==
- 20 February – The Flag of Australia, altered so that the stars of the Southern Cross (except the smallest one) have seven points each, is approved by Edward VII.
- 6 April – South Australian Government prospecting expedition, was the first major expedition Herbert Basedow participated in. Its purpose was to inspect the Musgrave, Mann and Tomkinson ranges and neighbouring areas for signs of gold and other mineral deposits.
- 25 August – The Judiciary Act is passed in the Australian parliament.
- 24 September – Edmund Barton steps down as prime minister and is succeeded by Alfred Deakin.
- 6 October – The High Court of Australia convenes for the first time.
- 24 November – Sir George Clarke retires as Governor of Victoria. Sir John Madden, the lieutenant governor, acts in his place until the appointment of a new governor.
- 28 November – The oil tanker SS Petriana strikes a reef at the entrance to Port Phillip Bay. Two days later, its cargo of 1,300 tonnes of crude oil is released, causing the first major oil spill in Australia.
- 16 December – Australia's second federal election is held, the first in the world in which women were permitted to vote and stand for parliament. The incumbent Protectionist Party led by Alfred Deakin defeated the opposition Free Trade Party led by George Reid. Selina Anderson, Vida Goldstein, Nellie Martel, and Mary Moore-Bentley become the first women in the British Empire to stand for a national parliament; none are successful.
- 18 December – The first train runs from Rockhampton to Brisbane.

== Arts and literature ==
- Edward Officer wins the Wynne Prize with Glenora
- The Austral Society was founded due to the influence of The Toowoomba poet George Essex Evans

== Sport ==
- Lord Cardigan wins the Melbourne Cup
- New South Wales wins the Sheffield Shield

== Births ==
- 10 January – Pud Thurlow, cricketer (d. 1975)
- 21 January – Sir John Eccles, neurophysiologist and Nobel recipient (d. 1997)
- 22 April – Daphne Akhurst, tennis player (d. 1933)
- 21 June – Lucy Sutherland, Australian-born British historian, academic and public servant (d. 1980)
- 22 June – Sir Garfield Barwick, 7th Chief Justice of Australia (d. 1997)

== Deaths ==
- 2 January – Sir Frederick Sargood, Victorian politician (born in the United Kingdom and died in New Zealand) (b. 1834)
- 9 February – Sir Charles Gavan Duffy, 8th Premier of Victoria (born in the United Kingdom and died in France) (b. 1816)
- 12 September – Duncan Gillies, 14th Premier of Victoria (born in the United Kingdom) (b. 1834)

== See also ==
- 1903
- 1900s
