= 1909 in Australia =

- Decades: 1880s; 1890s; 1900s; 1910s; 1920s
- See also: 1909 in Australian literature; Other events of 1909; Timeline of Australian history

1909 in Australia
- Monarch: Edward VII
- Governor-General: William Ward, 2nd Earl of Dudley
- Prime minister: Alfred Deakin
- Population: 4,272,439
- Elections: Queensland, Tasmania

The following lists events that happened during 1909 in the Commonwealth of Australia.

== Incumbents ==
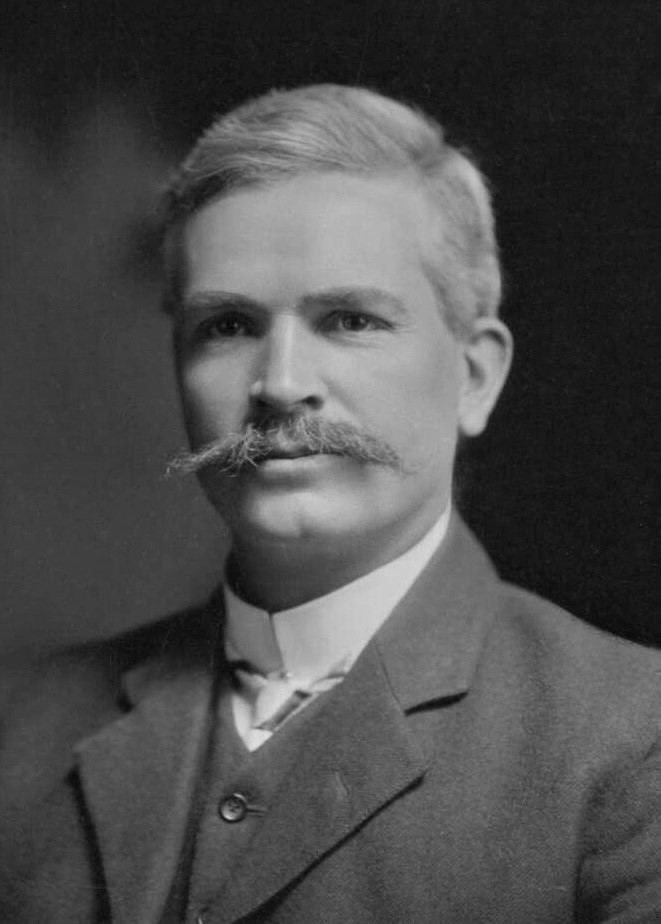
Andrew Fisher

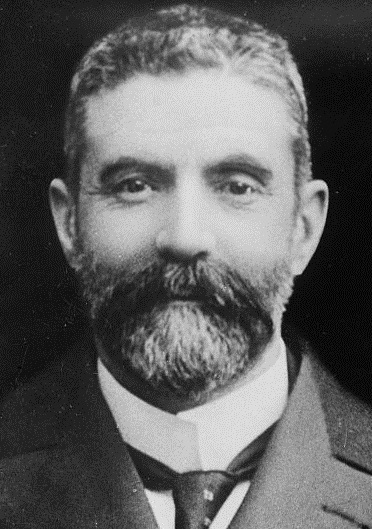
Alfred Deakin

- Monarch – Edward VII
- Governor-General – William Ward, 2nd Earl of Dudley
- Prime Minister – Andrew Fisher (until 2 June), then Alfred Deakin
- Chief Justice – Samuel Griffith

=== State premiers ===
- Premier of New South Wales – Charles Wade
- Premier of South Australia – Thomas Price (until 5 June), then Archibald Peake
- Premier of Queensland – William Kidston
- Premier of Tasmania – John Evans (until 19 June), then Sir Elliott Lewis (until 20 October), then John Earle (until 27 October), then Sir Elliott Lewis
- Premier of Western Australia – Sir Newton Moore
- Premier of Victoria – Sir Thomas Bent (until 8 January), then John Murray

=== State governors ===
- Governor of New South Wales – Admiral Sir Harry Rawson (until 24 March), then Frederic Thesiger, 3rd Baron Chelmsford (from 28 May)
- Governor of South Australia – Sir George Le Hunte (until 2 January), then Sir Day Bosanquet (from 29 March)
- Governor of Queensland – Frederic Thesiger, 3rd Baron Chelmsford (until 26 May), then Sir William MacGregor (from 2 December)
- Governor of Tasmania – Sir Gerald Strickland (until 20 May), then Sir Harry Barron (from 29 September)
- Governor of Western Australia – Admiral Sir Frederick Bedford (until 23 April), then Sir Gerald Strickland (from 31 May)
- Governor of Victoria – Sir Thomas Gibson-Carmichael

== Events ==
- 8 January – Sir Thomas Bent retires as Premier of Victoria, and is replaced by John Murray.
- 9 March – Electric trams begin operation in Adelaide.
- 31 March – Victoria is the last Australian state to grant women's suffrage.
- 30 April – Tasmania begins to use the Hare-Clark single transferable vote method in the 1909 general election.
- 26 May – The Protectionist Party and the Free Trade Party merge to form the Fusion Party, led by Alfred Deakin.
- 2 June – The Labor government of Andrew Fisher is ousted from office by Alfred Deakin's Fusion Party, and Deakin becomes Prime Minister for the third time.
- 5 June – Steam trams begin operation in Rockhampton, Queensland.
- 18 to 21 August – Disastrous floods strike Victoria.
- 6 October – Martha Rendell becomes the last woman to be hanged in Western Australia.
- 9 October – John Earle becomes Premier of Tasmania, leading Tasmania's first Labor government, however Earle's minority government only lasts a week.
- 6 December - the Newcastle–Bolgart Railway was opened.
- 10 December – The University of Queensland is established.
- 14 December – New South Wales passes law ceding land to the Commonwealth for construction of the national capital, Canberra.
- 21 December – British Field Marshal Lord Kitchener arrives in Darwin after an invitation from Alfred Deakin to review Australia's military and defence plans.
- 24 December – Former Prime Minister Sir George Reid resigns from Parliament to become Australia's first High Commissioner to the United Kingdom.

== Science and technology ==
- 16 July – The first powered aeroplane flight in Australia is made.

== Sport ==
- 29 January – New South Wales wins the Sheffield Shield
- 15 June – Representatives from England, Australia and South Africa meet at Lord's and form the Imperial Cricket Conference.
- 21 August – Andrew Wood wins the inaugural men's national marathon title, clocking 2:59:15 in Brisbane. Though billed as the Australasian Championships, the Australian Athletic Union did not consider it to be the official championship.
- 31 August – The first interstate ice hockey competition is held in Melbourne.
- 14 September - The 1909 NSWRFL season culminates in the grand final which was forfeited by Balmain to make South Sydney back-to-back premiers
- 29 October – The South Melbourne Swans defeat the Carlton Blues 4.14 (38) to 4.12 (36) in the 1909 VFL Grand Final.
- 2 November – Prince Foote wins the Melbourne Cup.

== Births ==
- 19 January – Leon Goldsworthy, explosives expert (died 1994)
- 8 February – Elisabeth Murdoch, philanthropist (died 2012)
- 13 February – Reg Ansett, businessman and aviator (died 1981)
- 2 March – Percival Bazeley, scientist (died 1991)
- 19 March – Nell Hall Hopman, tennis player (died 1968)
- 26 March – Chips Rafferty, actor (died 1971)
- 9 April – Robert Helpmann, dancer and choreographer (died 1986)
- 23 May – William Sidney, 1st Viscount De L'Isle, Governor General of Australia (died 1991)
- 15 June – Cyril Walsh, High Court judge (died 1973)
- 20 June – Errol Flynn, Australian actor (died 1959)
- 23 June – Keith Virtue, aviator (died 1980)
- 26 June – Mavis Thorpe Clark, novelist, writer (died 1999)
- 6 July – Eric Reece, Premier of Tasmania (died 1999)
- 13 August – Brian Lawrance, bandleader (died 1983)
- 9 September – Decima Norman, athlete (died 1983)
- 10 September – Dorothy Hill, geologist (died 1998)
- 3 December – Stanley Burbury, Governor of Tasmania (died 1995)

== Deaths ==
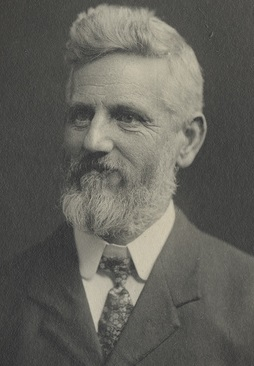
Thomas Price

- 9 February – Charles Conder, artist (born and died in the United Kingdom) (b. 1868)
- 4 March – Max Hirsch, Victorian politician, businessman and economist (born in Prussia and died in Russia) (b. 1852)
- 14 March – William Charles Kernot, engineer (born in the United Kingdom) (b. 1845)
- 6 April – Sir Julian Salomons, 5th Chief Justice of New South Wales (born in the United Kingdom) (b. 1835)
- 18 April – William Saumarez Smith, Anglican archbishop (born in the United Kingdom) (b. 1836)
- 28 April – Henry D'Esterre Taylor, banker and federationist (b. 1853)
- 23 May – Elias Solomon, Western Australian politician (born in the United Kingdom) (b. 1839)
- 31 May – Thomas Price, 24th Premier of South Australia (born in the United Kingdom) (b. 1852)
- 29 June – Sir George Shenton, Western Australian politician (died in the United Kingdom) (b. 1842)
- 4 July – Alfred Compigne, Queensland politician (born in the United Kingdom) (b. 1818)
- 23 July – Sir Frederick Holder, 19th Premier of South Australia (b. 1850)
- 8 August – Mary MacKillop, religious sister (b. 1842)
- 18 September – Mary Lee, suffragette and social reformer (born in Ireland) (b. 1821)
- 6 October – Martha Rendell, convicted murderer (b. 1871)
- 10 November – George Essex Evans, poet (born in the United Kingdom) (b. 1863)
- 6 December – Sir William Henry Bundey, South Australian politician and judge (born in the United Kingdom) (b. 1838)
