= 1911 in Australia =

- Decades: 1890s; 1900s; 1910s; 1920s; 1930s
- See also: 1911 in Australian literature; Other events of 1911; Timeline of Australian history

The following lists events that happened during 1911 in Australia.

1911 in Australia
- Monarch: George V
- Governor-General: William Ward, 2nd Earl of Dudley, then Thomas Denman, 3rd Baron Denman
- Prime minister: Andrew Fisher
- Population: 4,489,545
- Elections: Victoria, WA

== Incumbents ==
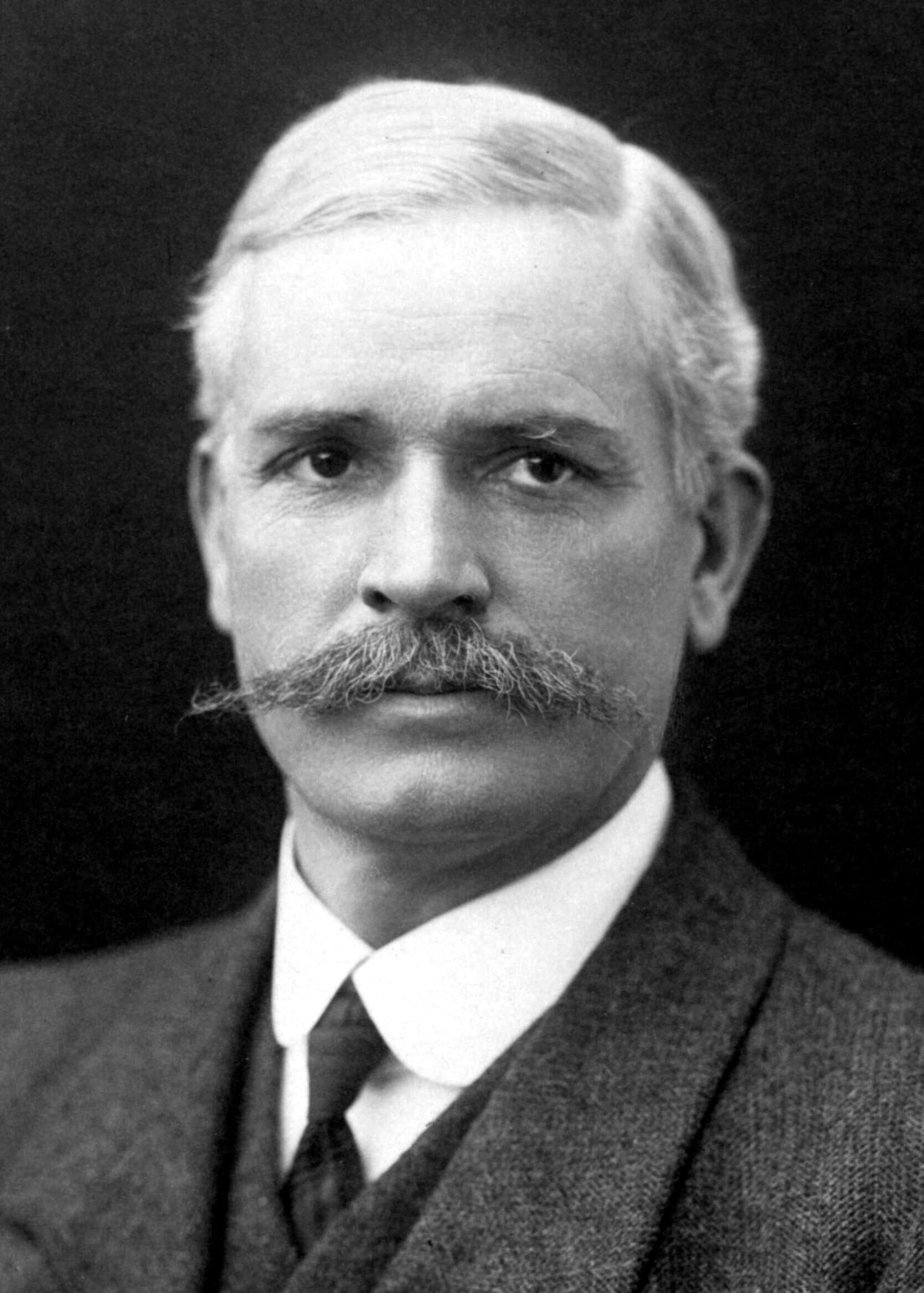
Andrew Fisher

- Monarch – George V
- Governor-General – William Ward, 2nd Earl of Dudley (until 31 July), then Thomas Denman, 3rd Baron Denman
- Prime Minister – Andrew Fisher
- Chief Justice – Samuel Griffith

=== State premiers ===
- Premier of New South Wales – James McGowen
- Premier of Queensland – William Kidston (until 7 February), then Digby Denham
- Premier of South Australia – John Verran
- Premier of Tasmania – Elliott Lewis
- Premier of Victoria – John Murray
- Premier of Western Australia – Frank Wilson (until 7 October), then John Scaddan

=== State governors ===
- Governor of New South Wales – Frederic Thesiger, 3rd Baron Chelmsford
- Governor of South Australia – Admiral Sir Day Bosanquet
- Governor of Queensland – Sir William MacGregor
- Governor of Tasmania – Major General Sir Harry Barron
- Governor of Western Australia – Sir Gerald Strickland
- Governor of Victoria – Sir Thomas Gibson-Carmichael

== Events ==
- The Australian Capital Territory is established through the Seat of Government (Administration) Act 1910.
- 1 January – The Northern Territory is politically separated from South Australia and transferred to Commonwealth control. The city of Palmerston is renamed Darwin in honour of Charles Darwin.
- 1 January – Compulsory military training comes into effect in Australia.
- 23 March – The steamer SS Yongala sinks in a cyclone off the coast of Townsville, Queensland killing 122 people.
- 3 April - 1911 Australian census was the first national population census. The day used for the census, was taken for the night between 2 and 3 April 1911. The total population of the Commonwealth of Australia was counted as 4,455,005.
- 26 April – A federal referendum is held containing two questions: one on Trade and Commerce and the other on Nationalisation of Monopolies. Neither is carried.
- 30 May – The Supreme Court of the Northern Territory is established.
- 1 June – The University of Queensland opens.
- 10 July – King George V grants the title of Royal Australian Navy to Australia's naval forces.
- 27 June – The Royal Military College, Duntroon opens.
- 3 October – A state election is held in Western Australia. The Labor Party led by John Scaddan defeats the incumbent government of Frank Wilson.
- 2 December – The Australasian Antarctic Expedition, led by Douglas Mawson, leaves Hobart to begin an expedition to Antarctica.
- The Commonwealth Bank is established by the Commonwealth Bank Act 1911.
- 18 December - The Marburg railway line opens in South west Queensland

== Arts and literature ==
- The Austral Society ceased functioning.

== Sport ==
- 16 September – The 1911 NSWRFL season culminates in a final re-play win to Eastern Suburbs, who defeated minor premiers Glebe 11 to 8.
- 30 September – Essendon become premiers of the 1911 VFL season, defeating Collingwood 5.11 (41) to 4.11 (35).
- 7 November – The Parisian wins the Melbourne Cup.

== Births ==
=== January - March ===
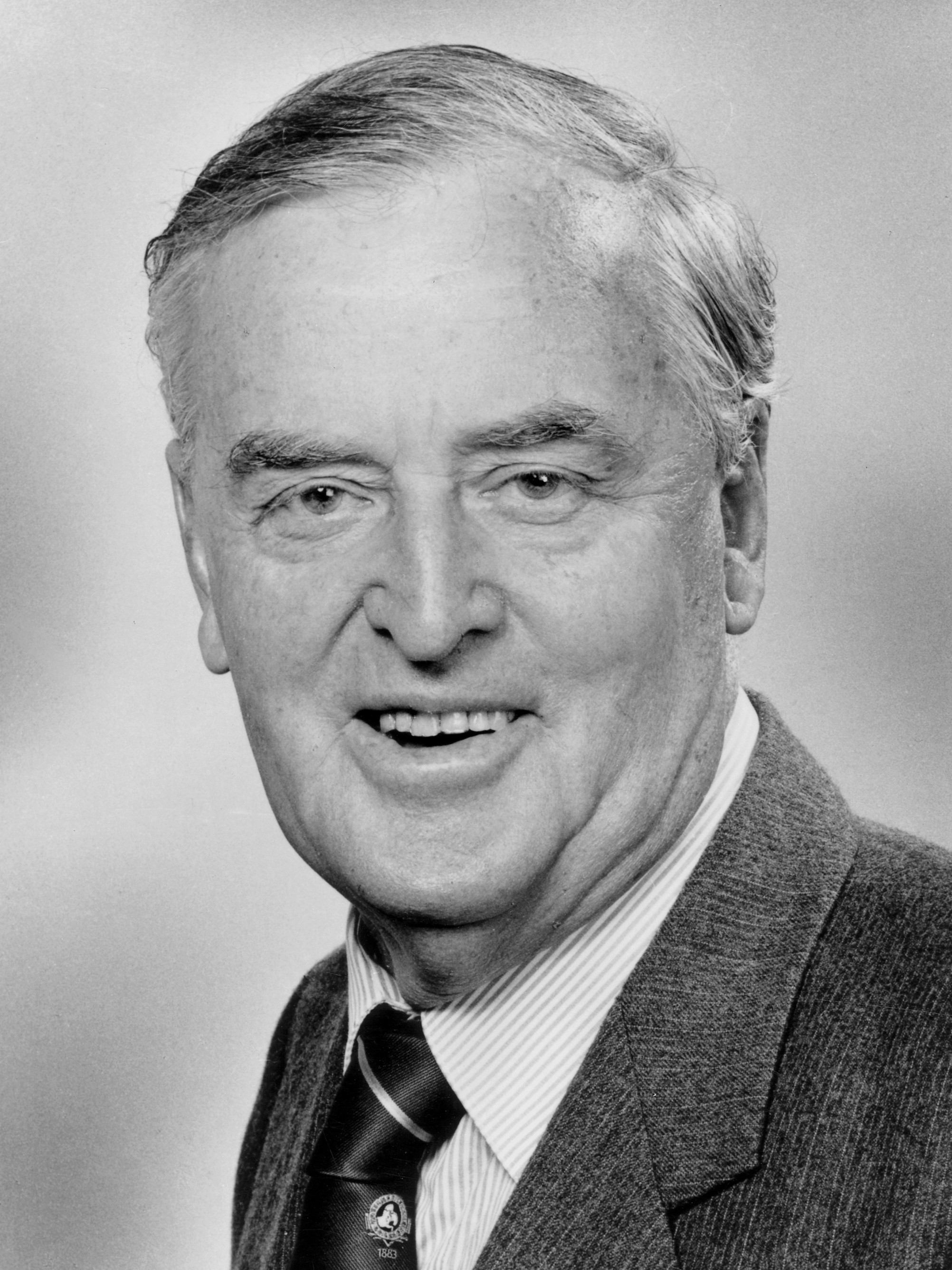
Sir Joh Bjelke-Petersen

- 7 January – Mervyn Waite, cricketer and Australian rules footballer (d. 1985)
- 11 January – Nora Heysen, artist (d. 2003)
- 13 January – Sir Joh Bjelke-Petersen, 31st Premier of Queensland (born in New Zealand) (d. 2005)
- 21 January – Dick Garrard, Olympic wrestler (d. 2003)
- 2 February – Jack Pizzey, 29th Premier of Queensland (d. 1968)
- 16 February – Hal Porter, author and playwright (d. 1984)
- 1 March – Ian Mudie, poet and author (d. 1976)
- 12 March – Ainslie Roberts, painter, photographer, and artist (born in the United Kingdom) (d. 1993)
- 18 March – Mick Cronin, Australian rules footballer and television commentator (d. 1979)
- 30 March – Pat Galvin, South Australian politician (d. 1980)

=== April - June ===
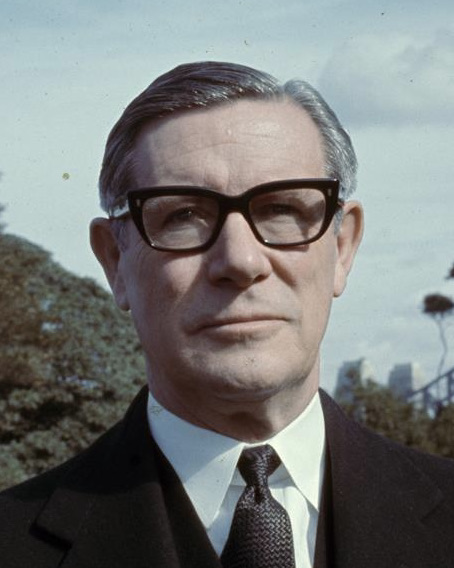
Sir Nigel Bowen

- 1 April – Ray Maher, New South Wales politician (d. 1966)
- 3 April – Sir Michael Woodruff, surgeon and scientist (born and died in the United Kingdom) (d. 2001)
- 6 April – Herb Graham, 4th Deputy Premier of Western Australia (d. 1982)
- 14 April – Sir Reginald Swartz, Queensland politician and soldier (d. 2006)
- 22 April – Max Dupain, photographer (d. 1992)
- 25 April – Leonard Long, artist (d. 2013)
- 11 May – Malcolm Scott, Western Australian politician (d. 1989)
- 12 May – Herbie Screaigh, Australian rules footballer (d. 2002)
- 15 May – Nigel Drury, Queensland politician (d. 1984)
- 24 May – Sir Archibald Glenn, industrialist and businessman (d. 2012)
- 26 May – Sir Nigel Bowen, New South Wales politician and Federal Court Chief Justice (born in Canada) (d. 1994)
- 29 May – George Szekeres, mathematician (born in Austria-Hungary) (d. 2005)
- 4 June – Sir Alan Walker, theologian (d. 2003)
- 8 June – Ralph Green, Australian rules footballer (Carlton) (d. 1991)
- 10 June – Chilla Christ, cricketer (d. 1998)
- 21 June – Chester Wilmot, war correspondent (d. 1954)

=== July - September ===
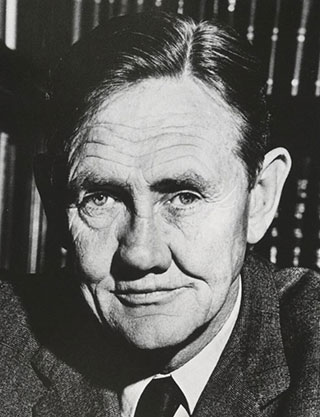
Sir John Gorton

- 4 July – Bruce Hamilton, public servant (d. 1989)
- 5 July – Haydn Bunton Sr., Australian rules footballer (Fitzroy) (d. 1955)
- 7 July – Sir Keith Jones, surgeon (d. 2012)
- 11 July – Olive Cotton, photographer (d. 2003)
- 17 July – Bertie Milliner, Queensland politician (d. 1975)
- 23 July – Ian Dougald McLachlan, military officer (d. 1991)
- 27 July – Percy Beames, Australian rules footballer (Melbourne) and cricketer (d. 2004)
- 27 August – Bluey Wilkinson, speedway rider (d. 1940)
- 30 August – Ted Harris, Queensland politician (d. 1993)
- 9 September – Sir John Gorton, 19th Prime Minister of Australia (born in New Zealand) (d. 2002)
- 16 September – Wilfred Burchett, journalist (d. 1983)
- 21 September – Afferbeck Lauder, author (d. 1998)
- 22 September – George Bennett, Australian rules footballer (Footscray, Hawthorn) (d. 1974)
- 29 September – Sir Charles Court, 21st Premier of Western Australia (born in the United Kingdom) (d. 2007)

=== October - December ===
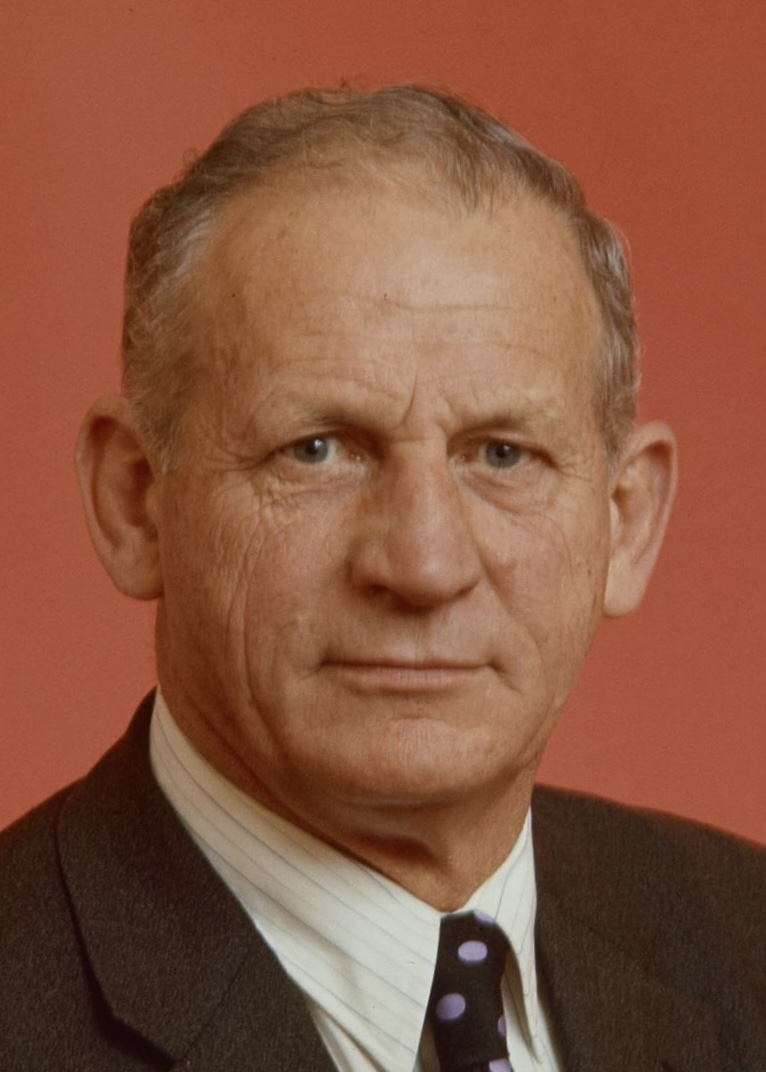
John England

- 4 October – Ray Whittorn, Victorian politician (d. 1995)
- 12 October – John England, New South Wales politician and Administrator of the Northern Territory (d. 1985)
- 14 October – Sir Marcus Loane, Anglican Archbishop of Sydney and Primate of Australia (d. 2009)
- 21 October – Dick Harris, Australian rules footballer (Richmond) (d. 1993)
- 26 October – John Hinde, broadcaster and film reviewer (d. 2006)
- 1 November – Samuel Warren Carey, geologist (d. 2002)
- 8 November – Sir Robert Jackson, public servant and United Nations administrator (d. 1991)
- 11 November – Bill Longley, speedway racer (d. 2005)
- 3 December – Bill Cahill, Australian rules footballer (Essendon) (d. 1966)
- 31 December – Dal Stivens, writer (d. 1997)

== Deaths ==
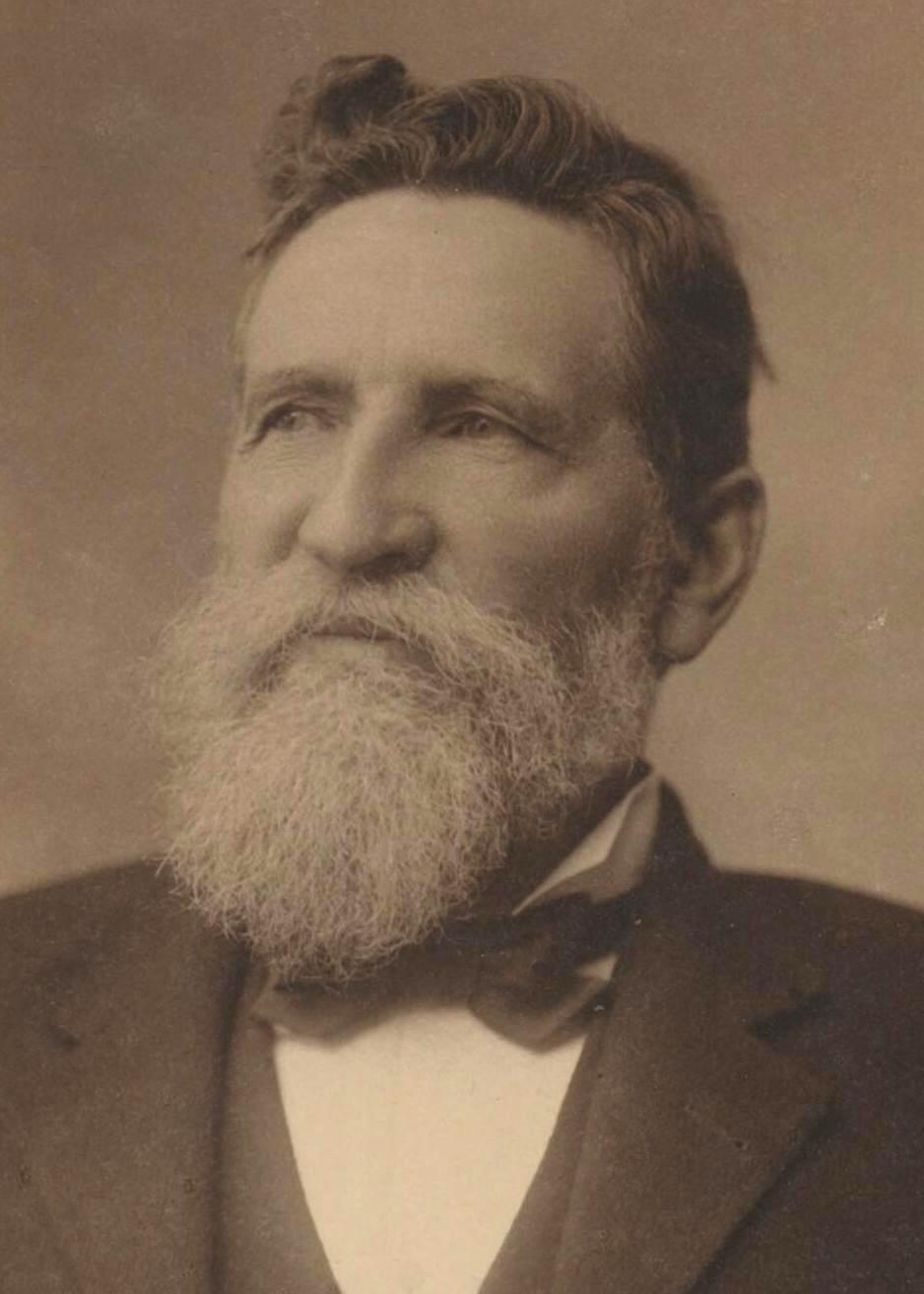
Allan McLean

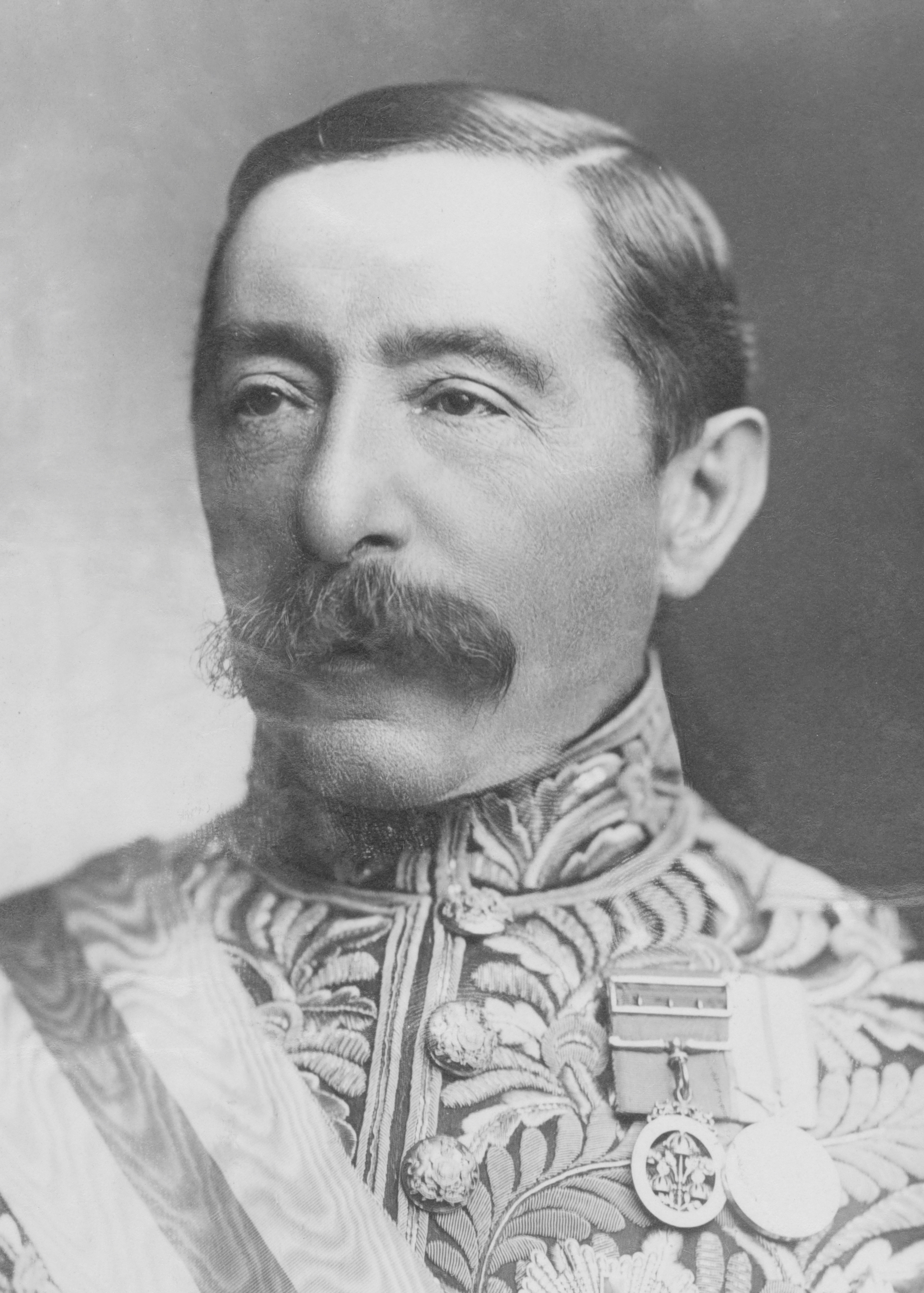
Lord Northcote

- 4 February – George Edwards, New South Wales politician (b. 1855)
- 18 February – Billy Murdoch, cricketer (b. 1854)
- 4 March – William Randell, South Australian politician and pioneer (born in the United Kingdom) (b. 1824)
- 8 March – John Neild, New South Wales politician (born in the United Kingdom) (b. 1846)
- 18 March – Sir Richard Baker, South Australian politician (b. 1842)
- 6 May – Thomas Edward Spencer, writer (born in the United Kingdom) (b. 1845)
- 9 July – Douglas Fry, artist (born in the United Kingdom) (b. 1872)
- 13 July – Allan McLean, 19th Premier of Victoria (b. 1840)
- 16 August – Francis Moran, Cardinal Archbishop of Sydney (born in Ireland) (b. 1830)
- 21 August – George Sydney Aldridge, businessman (born in the United Kingdom) (b. 1847)
- 13 September – James Rutherford, transit pioneer (born in the United States) (b. 1827)
- 23 September – John Arthur Barry, journalist and author (born in the United Kingdom) (b. 1850)
- 29 September – Lord Northcote, 3rd Governor-General of Australia (born and died in the United Kingdom) (b. 1846)
- 3 October – Rosetta Jane Birks, suffragist (b. 1856)
- 5 October – William Astley, short story writer (born in the United Kingdom) (b. 1855)
- 6 October – Sir John Hoad, 4th Chief of the General Staff (b. 1856)
- 8 October – Lee Batchelor, South Australian politician (b. 1865)
- 15 October – Norman Selfe, civil engineer (born in the United Kingdom) (b. 1839)

== See also ==
- List of Australian films of the 1910s
