= 1907 in Australia =

- Decades: 1880s; 1890s; 1900s; 1910s; 1920s
- See also: Other events of 1907; Timeline of Australian history

1907 in Australia
- Monarch: Edward VII
- Governor-General: Henry Northcote, 1st Baron Northcote
- Prime minister: Alfred Deakin
- Population: 4,122,201
- Elections: Victoria, New South Wales, Queensland

The following lists events that happened during 1907 in Australia.

== Incumbents ==
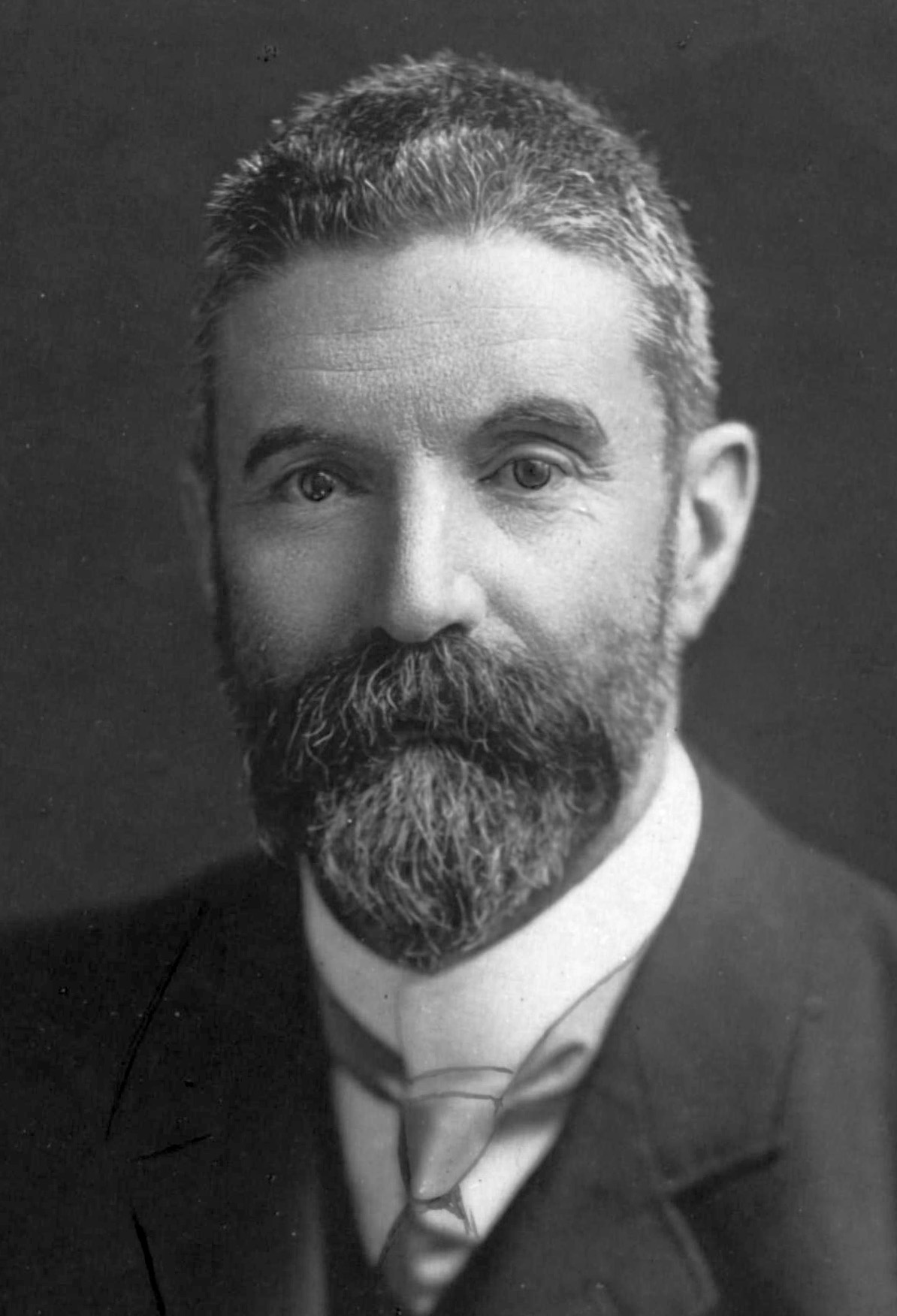
Alfred Deakin

- Monarch – Edward VII
- Governor-General – The Lord Northcote
- Prime Minister – Alfred Deakin
- Chief Justice – Samuel Griffith

=== State premiers ===
- Premier of New South Wales – Joseph Carruthers (until 2 October), then Charles Wade
- Premier of South Australia – Thomas Price
- Premier of Queensland – William Kidston (until 19 November), then Robert Philp
- Premier of Tasmania – John Evans
- Premier of Western Australia – Newton Moore
- Premier of Victoria – Thomas Bent

=== State governors ===
- Governor of New South Wales – Admiral Sir Harry Rawson
- Governor of South Australia – Sir George Ruthven Le Hunte
- Governor of Queensland – Frederic Thesiger, 3rd Baron Chelmsford
- Governor of Tasmania – Sir Gerald Strickland
- Governor of Western Australia – Admiral Sir Frederick Bedford
- Governor of Victoria – Major-General Sir Reginald Talbot

== Events ==
- 19 January – A tropical cyclone hits Cooktown, Queensland, killing six people.
- 4 February – Angus & Robertson booksellers is incorporated as a public company.
- 21 February – The Bondi Surf Bather's Lifesaving Club is formed at Bondi Beach, Sydney, the first of its kind in the world.
- 15 March – A general election is held in Victoria. The CLP government of Thomas Bent is returned.
- 25 April – Tasmania adopts the Hare-Clark single transferable vote system, and introduces postal voting.
- 8 May – Carlton & United Breweries is formed by the merger of six major Melbourne breweries.
- 7 July – The Australian Navy Cadets is established.
- 9 July – First telephone (trunk line) connection between Sydney and Melbourne opens.
- 16 July – The Federal Government announces it will spend £2500 a year to encourage British immigration to Australia.
- 23 October – 30 November The Women's Work Exhibition is held in Melbourne, Victoria.
- 24 October – Chris Watson resigns as leader of the Australian Labor Party.
- 8 November – Justice H. B. Higgins hands down the Harvester Judgment, enshrining in law a minimum wage for Australian workers.
- 2 December – The Victorian Railways A2 class locomotive begins operating in Victoria.

== Science and technology ==
- 2 July – Trunk telephone cables connecting Sydney and Melbourne are completed.
- 10 July – The first telephone call between Sydney and Melbourne is made.
- 7 March – The Murrumbidgee Irrigation Scheme commences in southern New South Wales.

== Arts and literature ==
- 23 October – The First Australian Exhibition of Women's Work is held at the Royal Exhibition Building in Melbourne.

My Waratah1907 by Bert Rache

== Film ==
- 2 November – A film adaptation of Robbery Under Arms is released.

== Sport ==
- 16 July – Australasia, a team consisting of players from Australia and New Zealand, wins the 1907 International Lawn Tennis Challenge (now known as the Davis Cup. Norman Brookes becomes the first Australian to win the Men's Singles at Wimbledon.
- 8 August – The New South Wales Rugby Football League is formed in Sydney, introducing the sport of rugby league in Australia.
- 5 November – Apologue wins the Melbourne Cup.
- Cricket – New South Wales wins the Sheffield Shield

== Births ==
- 6 January – David Fleay, naturalist (died 1993)
- 14 February – Alan Hulme, politician and Postmaster-General (died 1989)
- 17 February – Marjorie Lawrence, singer (died 1979)
- 4 April – Robert Askin, Premier of New South Wales (died 1981)
- 3 June – Robert William Rankin, Royal Australian Navy office (died 1942)
- 2 July – Leo O'Brien, cricketer (died 1997)
- 12 July – Edward "Weary" Dunlop, surgeon and prisoner-of-war during World War II (died 1993)
- 21 July – A. D. Hope, poet and essayist (died 2000)
- 22 July – Jack Dennington, Australian rules footballer (died 1994)
- 25 July – Bill Shankland, all-round sportsman (died 1998)
- 12 August – Boy Charlton, swimmer (died 1975)
- 15 August – Brian Grieve, botanist (died 1997)
- 8 September – William Wentworth, politician (died 2003)
- 1 October – Harry Collier, VFL footballer for Collingwood (died 1994)
- 9 October – John O'Grady, writer (died 1981)
- 18 November – Gwen Meredith, author, playwright and radio writer (died 2006)
- 19 November – Adrien Albert, medicinal chemist (died 1989)
- 29 November – Douglas Menzies, former Justice of the High Court of Australia (died 1974)

== Deaths ==
- 16 January – Rev. Dr John Gibson Paton, Protestant missionary to the New Hebrides (born 1824)
- 31 January – John See, former Premier of New South Wales (1901–1904) (born 1844)
- 22 February – Henry Chamberlain Russell, astronomer and meteorologist (born 1836)
- 14 April – Charles Henry Bromby, Anglican bishop of Tasmania (born 1814)
- 18 April – Walter Padbury, pioneer and philanthropist (born 1817)
- 12 June John Dennant, geologist and educational administrator (born 1839)
- 14 June – Bob McLeod, cricketer (born 1868)
- 8 July – John Horgan, politician (born 1834)
- 24 July David Scott Mitchell, founder of the Mitchell Library (born 1836)
- 14 November – Andrew Inglis Clark, Tasmanian politician (born 1848)
- 21 November – Harry Boyle, cricketer (born 1847)
- 22 November – Henry Clarke, businessman and politician (born 1822)
- 29 December – Lorimer Fison, anthropologist (born 1832)

== See also ==
- List of Australian films before 1910
- 1906 in Australia
- 1907
- 1908 in Australia
- Timeline of Australian history
