= 1910 in Australia =

- Decades: 1890s; 1900s; 1910s; 1920s; 1930s
- See also: 1910 in Australian literature; Other events of 1910; Federal election; Timeline of Australian history

The following lists events that happened during 1910 in Australia.

1910 in Australia
- Monarch: Edward VII, then George V
- Governor-General: William Ward, 2nd Earl of Dudley
- Prime minister: Alfred Deakin, then Andrew Fisher
- Population: 4,367,405
- Elections: Federal, South Australia, New South Wales

== Incumbents ==
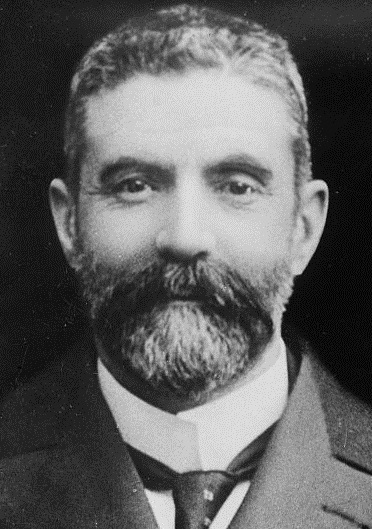
Alfred Deakin

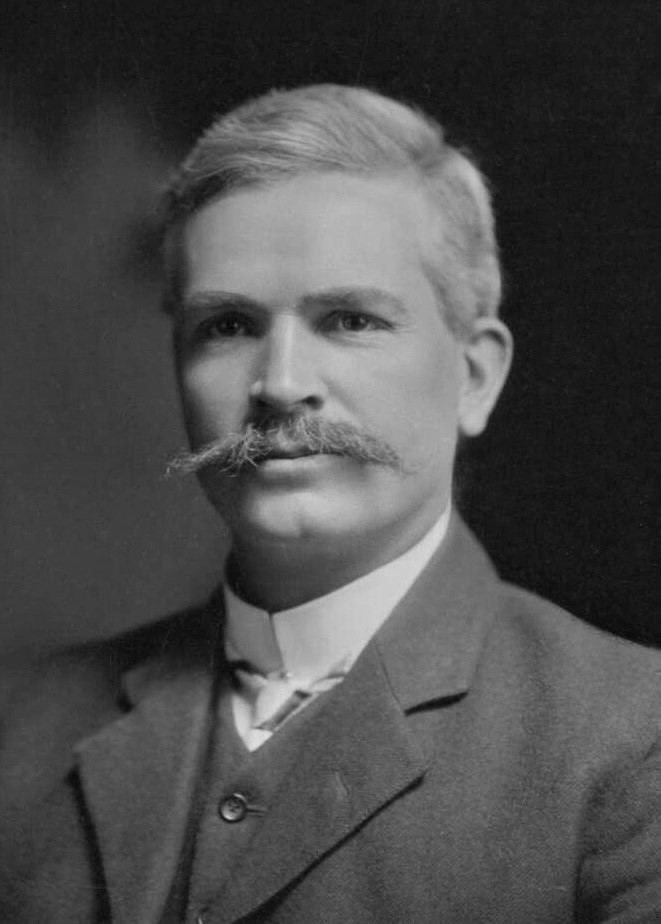
Andrew Fisher

- Monarch – Edward VII (until 6 May), then George V
- Governor-General – William Ward, 2nd Earl of Dudley
- Prime Minister – Alfred Deakin (until 29 April), then Andrew Fisher
- Chief Justice – Samuel Griffith

=== State premiers ===
- Premier of New South Wales – Charles Wade (until 1 October), then James McGowen
- Premier of South Australia – Archibald Peake (until 3 June), then John Verran
- Premier of Queensland – William Kidston
- Premier of Tasmania – Sir Neil Elliott Lewis
- Premier of Western Australia – Sir Newton Moore (until 16 September), then Frank Wilson
- Premier of Victoria – John Murray

=== State governors ===
- Governor of New South Wales – Frederic Thesiger, 3rd Baron Chelmsford
- Governor of South Australia – Admiral Sir Day Bosanquet
- Governor of Queensland – Sir William MacGregor
- Governor of Tasmania – Major General Sir Harry Barron
- Governor of Western Australia – Sir Gerald Strickland
- Governor of Victoria – Sir Thomas Gibson-Carmichael

== Events ==
- 21 March – Harry Houdini achieves one of the first powered flights in Australia.
- 13 April – A referendum is held into alteration of the Australian Constitution regarding state debt and surplus revenue. The state debt question was carried, the surplus revenue question was not.
- 6 May – Edward VII dies, his son George V becomes King of the United Kingdom and the British Dominions.
- 16 September – The Australian Treasury is given authority to issue currency, replacing the use of the British Pound.
- 16 November – The Northern Territory Acceptance Act 1910 receives Royal Assent from the Governor-General, transferring the Northern Territory from the control of South Australia to the Commonwealth.
- 19 November – A cyclone strikes the town of Broome, Western Australia, killing 40 people and destroying 20 houses.
- 25 November – The Royal Australian Navy is created with the passing of the Australian Naval Defence Act by the Federal Parliament. The destroyers HMAS Parramatta and HMAS Yarra arrive in Australia.
- 8 December – Geelong, Victoria is declared a city.
- Founding of Employers Mutual Limited.

== Science and technology ==
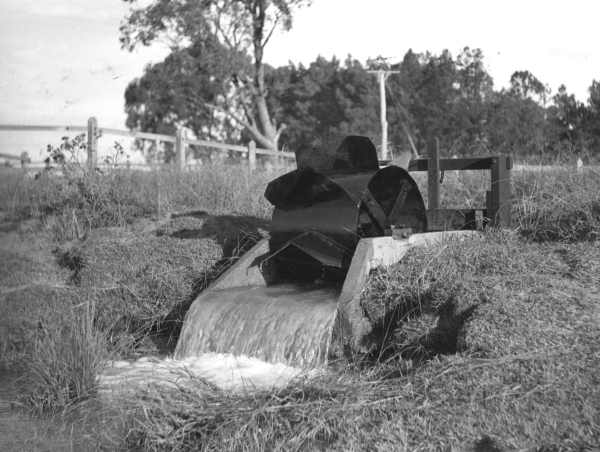
Dethridge wheel in 1936 – Victoria Australia

- Dethridge wheel developed – used to measure flow of irrigation water delivered to farms

== Arts and literature ==
'The Rivals Waltz' 1910 by Bert Rache

- Henry Handel Richardson's novel The Getting of Wisdom published

== Sport ==
- Comedy King wins the Melbourne Cup
- South Australia wins the Sheffield Shield
- The Great Britain rugby league team went on their first tour of Australasia and defeated Australia to win the Ashes.
- 17 September – The 1910 NSWRFL season culminates in a grand final between South Sydney and Newtown which is drawn 4 – 4. Newtown are crowned premiers by virtue of being minor premiers.

== Births ==
- 11 January – Shane Paltridge (died 1966), politician
- 13 January – Dexter Kruger (died 2021), Australian supercentenarian and oldest verified man in Australian history
- 28 January – Jim Willis (died 1995), botanist
- 7 April – Alec Downer (died 1981), politician
- 10 April – Bob Marshall (died 2004), billiards champion
- 17 April – Ivan Goff (died 1999), screenwriter
- 2 May – Laurie Nash (died 1986), cricketer and footballer
- 11 May – John Béchervaise (died 1998), Antarctic explorer
- 12 May – Elwyn Flint (died 1983), linguist
- 6 July – John Knott (died 1999), public servant
- 16 July – Stan McCabe (died 1968), cricketer
- 22 July – Alan Moorehead (died 1983), war correspondent
- 22 August – Kenneth McIntyre (died 2004), historian and mathematician
- 28 August
  - Kathleen Best (died 1957), first director of the Women's Royal Australian Army Corps
  - Tom Burke (died 1973), politician
- 22 September – Louis Bisdee, (died 2010) politician
- 24 September – Douglas Darby (died 1985), politician
- 1 October – José Enrique Moyal (died 1998), Palestinian-born mathematical physicist
- 31 October – Trevor Housley (died 1968), public servant
- 14 November - Ern Milliken (died 1992), cyclist

== Deaths ==
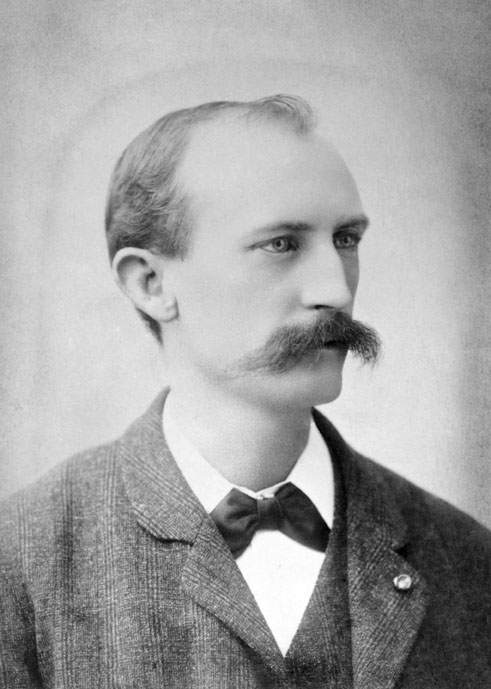
Anderson Dawson

- 4 January – Sir Frederick Darley, 6th Chief Justice of New South Wales (born in Ireland and died in the United Kingdom) (b. 1830)
- 18 January – James Cuthbertson, poet and schoolteacher (born in the United Kingdom) (b. 1851)
- 29 January – Sir Charles Todd, astronomer (born in the United Kingdom) (b. 1826)
- 10 March – Sir Malcolm McEacharn, Victorian politician and shipping magnate (born in the United Kingdom and died in France) (b. 1852)
- 15 March – Thomas Skene, Victorian politician (b. 1845)
- 19 March – James Smith, journalist and encyclopedist (born in the United Kingdom) (b. 1820)
- 3 April – Catherine Helen Spence, writer and suffragist (born in the United Kingdom) (b. 1825)
- 25 April – Edward William O'Sullivan, New South Wales politician and journalist (b. 1846)
- 27 May – George Britton Halford, anatomist and physiologist (born in the United Kingdom) (b. 1824)
- 25 June – Field Flowers Goe, Anglican bishop (born and died in the United Kingdom) (b. 1832)
- 7 July – Guglielmo Enrico Lardelli, composer (born in the United Kingdom) (b. 1857)
- 20 July – Anderson Dawson, 14th Premier of Queensland (b. 1863)
- 13 August - Micky Dore, rugby league and rugby union footballer (b. 1883)
- 22 August – Joey Palmer, cricketer (b. 1859)
- 26 August – Thomas Petrie, explorer, prospector and grazier (born in the United Kingdom) (b. 1831)
- 30 August – George Throssell, 2nd Premier of Western Australia (born in Ireland) (b. 1840)
- 23 September – Tup Scott, cricketer (b. 1858)
- 14 November – Charles Gregory, cricketer (b. 1878)

== See also ==
- List of Australian films of the 1910s
