= 1908 in Australia =

- Decades: 1880s; 1890s; 1900s; 1910s; 1920s
- See also: 1908 in Australian literature; Other events of 1908; Timeline of Australian history

The following lists events that happened during 1908 in Australia.

1908 in Australia
- Monarch: Edward VII
- Governor-General: Henry Northcote, 1st Baron Northcote, then William Ward, 2nd Earl of Dudley
- Prime minister: Alfred Deakin, then Andrew Fisher
- Population: 4,190,692
- Elections: Victoria, Queensland, Western Australia

== Incumbents ==
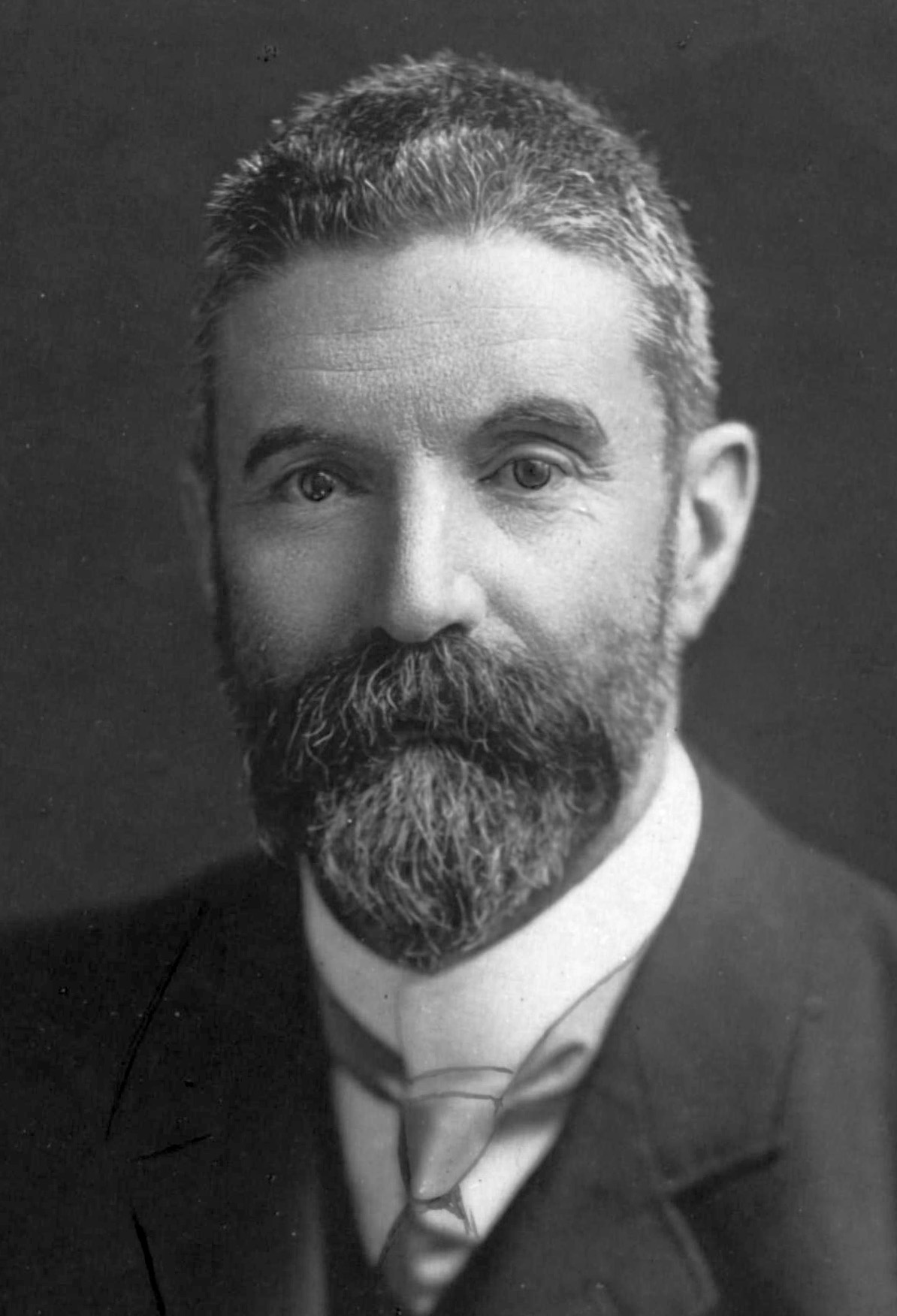
Alfred Deakin

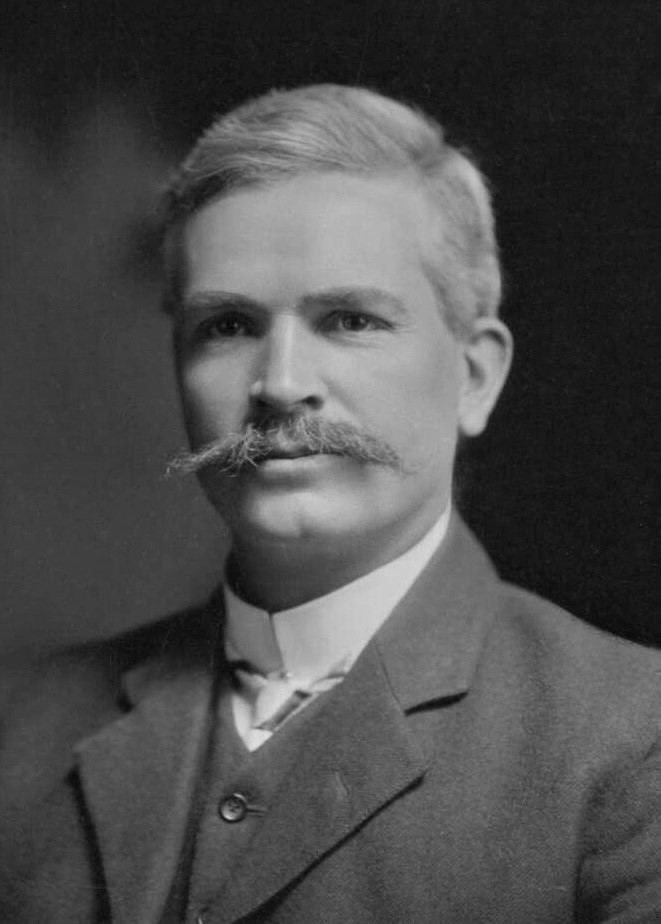
Andrew Fisher

- Monarch – Edward VII
- Governor-General – Henry Northcote, 1st Baron Northcote (until 9 September), then William Ward, 2nd Earl of Dudley
- Prime Minister – Alfred Deakin (until 13 November), then Andrew Fisher
- Chief Justice – Samuel Griffith

=== State premiers ===
- Premier of New South Wales – Charles Wade
- Premier of South Australia – Thomas Price
- Premier of Queensland – Robert Philp (until 18 February), then William Kidston
- Premier of Tasmania – John Evans
- Premier of Western Australia – Newton Moore
- Premier of Victoria – (Sir) Thomas Bent

=== State governors ===
- Governor of New South Wales – Admiral Sir Harry Rawson
- Governor of South Australia – Sir George Ruvthen Le Hunte
- Governor of Queensland – Frederic Thesiger, 3rd Baron Chelmsford
- Governor of Tasmania – Sir Gerald Strickland
- Governor of Western Australia – Admiral Sir Frederick Bedford
- Governor of Victoria – Major General Sir Reginald Talbot (until 6 July), then Sir Thomas Gibson-Carmichael (from 27 July)

== Events ==
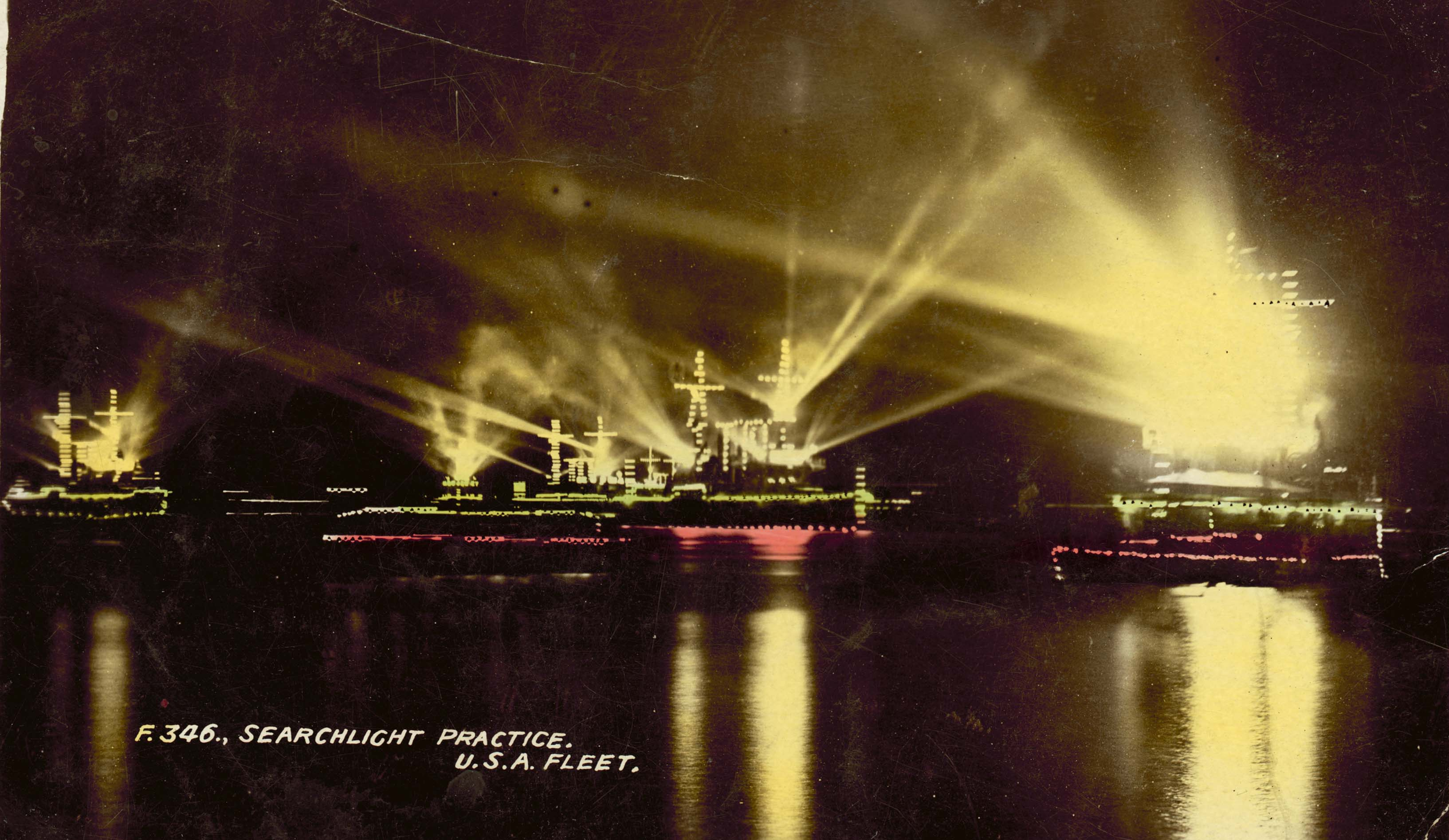
Great White Fleet in Sydney Harbour, 1908

- 10 March – Australians Douglas Mawson and Edgeworth David accompanied by Ernest Shackleton and others are the first people to scale Mount Erebus in Antarctica.
- 30 March – Commonwealth Quarantine service came into operation and took over quarantine stations in every state.
- 20 April – 44 are killed and 400 injured in the Sunshine train disaster.
- 7 May – The coat of arms of Australia are granted Royal Assent.
- August – Boys in Australia first participated in the scouting movement, within a year of scouting starting in England
- 20 August – The Great White Fleet, the first visit by the U.S. Navy to Australia, arrives in Sydney.
- 8 October – The capital of Australia is chosen, settling a feud between rivals Melbourne and Sydney.
- 13 November – The Australian Labor Party withdraws its support for the minority government of Prime Minister Alfred Deakin, forcing his replacement with Andrew Fisher.
- 18 November – The Victorian government passes the Adult Suffrage Bill 1908, granting female suffrage for the first time.
- 15 December – The Invalid and Old Age Pensions Act is passed, which sets up a national aged pension scheme (except for aliens, Aboriginals and naturalized Asiatics not born in Australia)
- 29 December – A general election is held in Victoria. The government of Sir Thomas Bent is returned to power.

== Science and technology ==
- 1 January – The Commonwealth Bureau of Meteorology formally commences operation.
- 3 February – first trans-Tasman radio transmission (via HMS Powerful in Tasman Sea)

== Arts and literature ==
- 16 May – The Commonwealth Literary Fund is established.
- Henry Handel Richardson's first novel Maurice Guest is published
- We of the Never Never by Mrs Aeneas Gunn is published
- The poem My Country by Dorothea Mackellar first published

Beautiful Eyes Waltz 1908
dedicated to Grace Palotta MIDI version

== Film ==
- 2 February – The Limelight Department of the Salvation Army films Grand Memorial Service, a film of the funeral of Major Kenneth McLeod, the Director of the Bayswater Boys' Home. The funeral was held at the Kew Cemetery in Melbourne.

== Sport ==
- 31 January – Victoria wins the 1907–08 Sheffield Shield.
- 11 February – Australia regains The Ashes with a 308 run victory over England.
- 20 April – The first New South Wales Rugby League premiership begins in Sydney.
- July - The 1908 Interstate rugby league series sees the first ever matches between New South Wales and Queensland
- 29 August – South Sydney win the grand final to become the first NSWRFL premiers
- 3 November – Lord Nolan wins the Melbourne Cup.
- At the 1908 Summer Olympics held in London, Australia forms a team with New Zealand and competes as Australasia. They win a gold medal for rugby football, a silver medal for middleweight boxing, and in swimming a silver medal for men's 400-metre freestyle and bronze medal for men's 1500 metre freestyle – both won by Frank Beaurepaire.
- Australia's national rugby league team sets sail for England on the 1908–09 Kangaroo tour of Great Britain.

== Births ==
- 23 February – William McMahon, 20th Prime Minister of Australia (died 1988)
- 15 May – Kevin Ellis, NSW politician (died 1975)
- 20 May – Henry Bolte, Premier of Victoria (died 1990)
- 10 July – John Armstrong, ALP senator (died 1977)
- 5 August – Harold Holt, 17th Prime Minister of Australia (died 1967)
- 10 August – Rica Erickson, Australian botanist (died 2009)
- 26 August – Alexandra Hasluck, author and social historian (died 1993)
- 27 August – Donald Bradman, cricketer (died 2001)
- 10 September – Angus Bethune, Premier of Tasmania (died 2004)
- 17 October – Wally Prigg, rugby league player (died 1980)
- 3 November – Eddie Scarf, boxer and wrestler (died 1980)

== Deaths ==
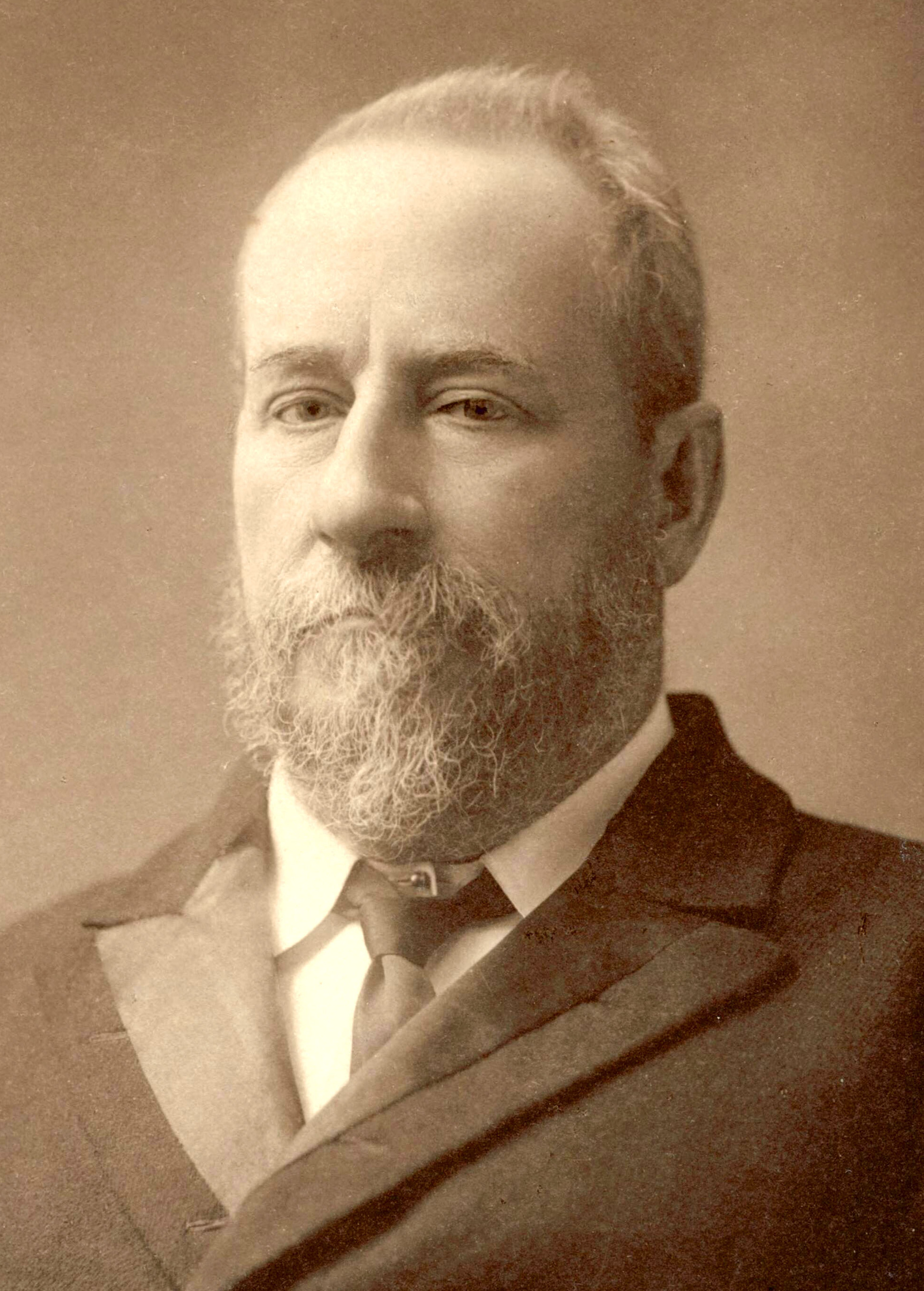
Charles Kingston

- 14 February – David Syme, newspaper proprietor (b. 1827)
- 29 February – John Hope, 7th Earl of Hopetoun, 1st Governor-General of Australia (born in the United Kingdom and died in France) (b. 1860)
- 7 March – Alfred William Howitt, anthropologist, explorer, and naturalist (born in the United Kingdom) (b. 1830)
- 23 March – Alexander Paterson, Queensland politician (born in the United Kingdom) (b. 1844)
- 11 May – Charles Kingston, 20th Premier of South Australia (b. 1850)
- 12 July — Robert Potter, minister and writer (born 1831)
- 20 October – Vaiben Louis Solomon, 21st Premier of South Australia (b. 1853)
- 14 November – Ernest Favenc, explorer, journalist and author (born in the United Kingdom) (b. 1845)
- 18 November – Pierce Galliard Smith, cleric (born in the United Kingdom) (b. 1826)

== See also ==
- List of Australian films before 1910
