= Toowoomba Prison =

Historic prison site in Queensland, Australia

Coordinates: 27°33′S 151°57′E

Toowoomba Gaol
- Interactive map of Toowoomba Gaol
- Location: Toowoomba, Queensland
- Status: Non-operational
- Security class: Historic Site
- Opened: 1864
- Closed: 1900
- Managed by: Site reused

Toowoomba Gaol is a historic prison site in Toowoomba, Queensland, Australia.

== History of site ==
The original Toowoomba Gaol opened in 1864. William Murphy (who served in the Crimean War) became first Governor of the Toowoomba Gaol.

Female prisoners were transferred from Central Gaol, Brisbane, to Toowoomba Gaol in 1870. A woman's reformatory with a well-patronised laundry was constructed in 1883–84 by Richard Godsall outside the prison walls and opened in 1869. On 14 Sep 1898 the prison was proclaimed a prison for females only.

The gaol was closed in 1903 after the prisoners were transferred to Boggo Road Gaol and demolition commenced. Some of the hand-made bricks (using clay dug from pits in Queens Park) from the demolished structure were used to build the Boer Wall Memorial Gateway at the Margaret Street end of East Creek Park near the Mother's Memorial, after being held in storage, as the plaque thereon states.

After the prison closure in 1903, it was reused for several purposes before becoming Rutlands Guest House from 1930 to 1959. It was purchased by the DeMolay Order (DeMolay International) for 6000 pounds in 1960 and renamed DeMolay House.

The whole original site and surrounding modern buildings, including the Repertory Theatre, are the source of many ghost sightings/tales. One of the original "dark cells" is still part of the basement. At night the ghost of a reformatory inmate can be seen in the attic on the first floor of the building. One of the girls was so unhappy with her situation that she committed suicide by hanging herself there.

== Historic Plaque ==
A plaque marking the site of the old Toowoomba Gaol is located at the eastern end of Stirling Street, off Burstow Street, in the Caledonian Estate heritage precinct. The basalt foundations on the site, are all that remain of the Toowoomba Gaol. The foundations supported the red brick wall which confined 52 prisoners in 1869.

== Motel ==
The Park Motor Inn at 88 Margaret Street was built on the northeast part of the old gaol grounds.

== Women's Gaol Hospital ==
The original hospital site for the Women's Gaol at 92 Margaret Street is now the site of the Park House Cafe.

== Austral Hall ==
The Toowoomba poet George Essex Evans was influential in founding The Austral Society, which bought part of the grounds and let a tender to roof part of the prison yard in September 1904. The Austral Hall was built on this site.

After his death in 1909, the Austral Society ceased in 1911, and the building was later demolished, eventually being replaced in part by a townhouse block.

== Notorious prisoners ==
Hangmen were brought up from Brisbane as needed.

- Goff Lee – a Chinese cook, was hanged for murder in December 1869.
- Andrew Ritchie – convicted of murder and robbery under arms, was the first to be hanged at the gaol, in August 1864.
- John (Jacky) Whitton – an Aborigine, was hung for child rape in December 1869.

== See also ==
- George Essex Evans
- Jacques de Molay
- Knights Templar
- List of Australian Prisons and Detention Centres
