= Jack Dennington =

Australian rules footballer, born 1907

Personal information
- Full name: John Daniel Joseph Dennington
- Born: 22 July 1907; Collingwood, Victoria
- Died: 11 July 1994 (aged 86); Southport, Queensland
- Original team: Preston

Playing career^{1}
| Years | Club | Games (Goals) |
| 1931 | Footscray | 10 (3) |
- ^{1} Playing statistics correct to the end of 1931.

John Daniel Joseph Dennington (22 July 1907 – 11 July 1994) was an Australian rules footballer who played with Footscray in the Victorian Football League (VFL).
