= Austral Hall =

The Austral Society was founded in 1903 because of the influence of The Toowoomba poet George Essex Evans to promote Australian Arts and Culture.

The Society purchased part of the closed Toowoomba Gaol grounds and let a tender to roof part of the goal yard in September 1904. The Austral Hall was built on this site.

According to a commemorative plaque at 84-88 Margaret Street, Austral Hall was built on the site of the former Toowoomba Gaol and could accommodate 500 performers and 5000 audiences. Designed by architect William Hodgen, the building incorporated three surviving outer walls of the gaol and used cats-iron columns produced by Toowoomba Foundry. The hall was intended support the Autral Society’s promotion of music, literature, art and science, and was officially opened on 5 November 1904 by Sir Hugh Nelson, the Lieutenant Governor of Quessland.

Following George Essex Evans’s death in 1909, the Austral Society ceased operating in 1911.

Moving pictures were shown here by a local enterprise, Austral Pictures, until the Empire Theatre was built in 1911, and the building was later demolished.

Much of the roofing iron was sold and used to fence the old Toowoomba Showgrounds.

The remaining western section of the wall’s basalt foundations was covered with a town rock following an archeological excavation conducted by Dr. Bryce Baker of the University of Southern Queensland.
