= Betty Allan =

Australian statistician

Frances Elizabeth Allan
- Born: 11 July 1905; St Kilda, Victoria, Australia
- Died: 6 August 1952 (aged 47); Canberra Community Hospital, ACT
- Resting place: Canberra cemetery
- Other name: Betty
- Education: University of Melbourne
- Occupation: Statistician

Frances Elizabeth Allan (11 July 1905 – 6 August 1952) was an Australian statistician. She was known as the first statistician at the Commonwealth Scientific and Industrial Research Organisation (CSIRO), as "the effective founder of the CSIRO Division of Mathematics and Statistics", and for her advocacy of biometrics.

== Early life and education ==
Allan was born on 11 July 1905 in St Kilda, Victoria; her parents were both journalists with The Argus, and she was one of four sisters. As a schoolgirl, she attended the Melbourne Church of England Girls' Grammar School. She studied mathematics at the University of Melbourne, earning a bachelor's degree in 1926 and a master's in 1928 for her work with John Henry Michell on solitary waves on liquid-liquid interfaces.

In 1928 Allan traveled on a scholarship to Newnham College, Cambridge, where she studied applied mathematics, statistics, applied biology, and general agriculture.

== Research career ==
After her Cambridge studies, Allan travelled to Rothamsted Experimental Station in Hertfordshire to work alongside Ronald Fisher studying crop experiments and developing statistical methods. While at Rothamsted she produced three important papers, collaborating with John Wishart on one.

Returning to Australia in 1930, she became the first biometrician at CSIRO, appointed to the Division of Plant Industry. While at CSIRO, she provided statistical assistance to all six divisions alongside external organisations.

During her time at CSIRO, Allan also taught at Canberra University College and the Australian Forestry School. In 1935, she helped found the Australian Institute of Agricultural Science.

== Marriage and later life ==
In 1940 she married CSIRO botanist Patrick Joseph Calvert, and was forced to retire by the laws of the time, which banned married women from public service. She died on 6 August 1952 in Canberra.

== Legacy ==
The Betty Allan Data Centre of CSIRO's Queensland Centre for Advanced Technologies is named after her. In 2019 the Statistical Society of Australia and Data61 created a joint travel award named in her honour.
