= Roy Leaper =

Australian rules footballer, born 1906

Personal information
- Full name: Frank Roy Leaper
- Born: 9 July 1906; Wagga Wagga, New South Wales
- Died: 6 November 2002 (aged 96)
- Original team: Lanes Motors
- Height: 184 cm (6 ft 0 in)
- Weight: 85 kg (187 lb)

Playing career^{1}
Years	Club	Games (Goals)
1926–28	St Kilda	16 (1)
- ^{1} Playing statistics correct to the end of 1928.

Frank Roy Leaper (9 July 1906 – 6 November 2002) was an Australian rules footballer who played with St Kilda in the Victorian Football League (VFL).
