= Pud Thurlow =

Australian cricketer

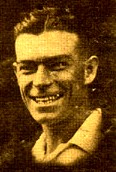

Personal information
- Full name: Hugh Motley Thurlow
- Born: 10 January 1903; Townsville, Queensland, Australia
- Died: 9 December 1975 (aged 72)"QLD BDM". Rosalie, Queensland, Australia
- Batting: Right-handed
- Bowling: Right-arm Fast bowling
- Role: Bowler

International information
- National side: Australia
- Only Test (cap 141): 29 January 1932 v South Africa

Domestic team information
- Years: Team
- 1928–1934: Queensland

Career statistics
Competition	Test	First-class
Matches	1	31
Runs scored	0	202
Batting average	0.00	5.31
100s/50s	0/0	0/0
Top score	0	23
Balls bowled	234	6608
Wickets	0	80
Bowling average	–	42.88
5 wickets in innings	0	5
10 wickets in match	0	0
Best bowling	0/33	6/59
Catches/stumpings	0/0	10/0
- Source: CricketArchive, 2 February 2009

Hugh Motley 'Pud' Thurlow (10 January 1903 – 9 December 1975) was an Australian cricketer who played in one Test in 1932. He was a right-arm fast bowler, born in Townsville, Queensland; left-arm fast bowler Mitchell Johnson the only other Test cricketer born in Townsville.

'Pud' was just the seventh Queensland-born player selected in 55 years of Test cricket. He was called up for the fourth match against South Africa in Adelaide in 1931–32, which Australia won, and never played for his country again. He opened the bowling twice and finished with 0-86 for the match, perhaps no disgrace considering Clarrie Grimmett and Bill O'Reilly shared 18 wickets on a spin-friendly deck.

Thurlow batted once and was run out for a duck, but considering he was a No.11 this hardly seemed a crime worthy of lifetime banishment from the team. Scroll up the scoresheet, however, and the mystery becomes clearer: Don Bradman was the man stranded at the far end ... not out 299. Thurlow is one of only a handful of one-test players with a record of 0 runs, 0 wickets and 0 catches; another one-test player with a record of 0 runs and 0 wickets is New South Wales spin bowler Bill Hunt, who coincidentally played in the same test with Pud in Adelaide in 1932 (Hunt taking one catch in that match).

Thurlow, an industrial chemist by profession, worked for Coca-Cola and was later General-manager of the Bulimba Brewery in Brisbane. Legend has it, whenever he was arranging an appointment with someone, he would ask them to come to his workplace, i.e. the Bulimba Brewery; where they'd inevitably get caught in an hours-long 'beer tasting' session. After everyone was feeling worse for the wear, a practical joker, he would invariably say: "What did you expect when you're invited to a brewery!"

Thurlow died in Rosalie, Queensland, aged 72.
