= Frederick William Haddon =

Australian journalist (1839–1906)

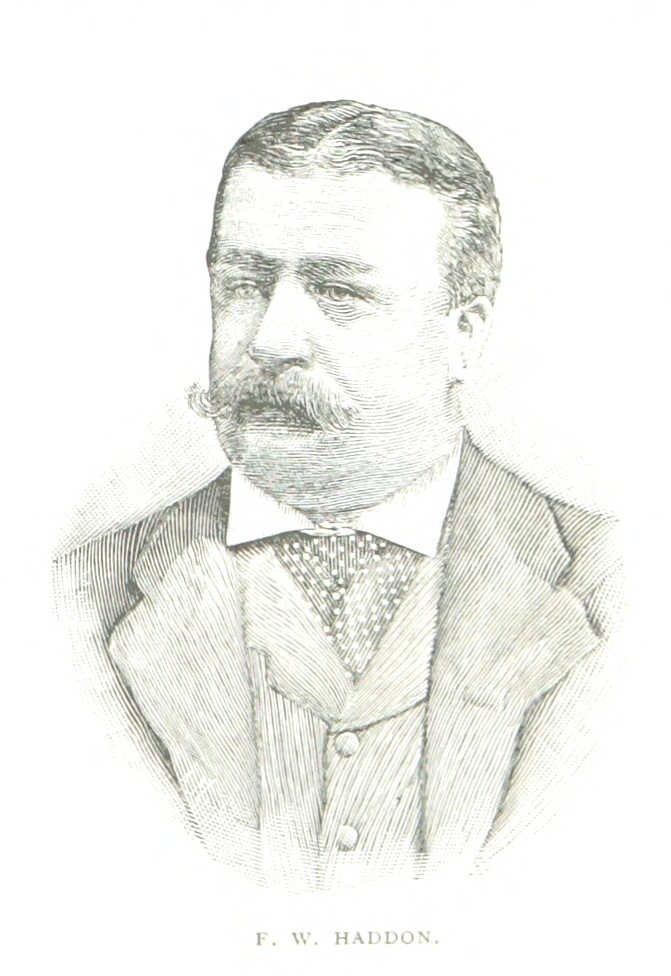
An 1888 illustration of Haddon

Frederick William Haddon (8 February 1839 – 7 March 1906) was an English-born Australian journalist and newspaper editor.

== Biography ==
Haddon was born at Croydon, England, the son of Richard Haddon, a schoolmaster and landscape artist, and his wife Mary Caroline, née Wykes. Haddon was educated at private schools and in 1859 became assistant-secretary of the Statistical Society of London and of the Institute of Actuaries.

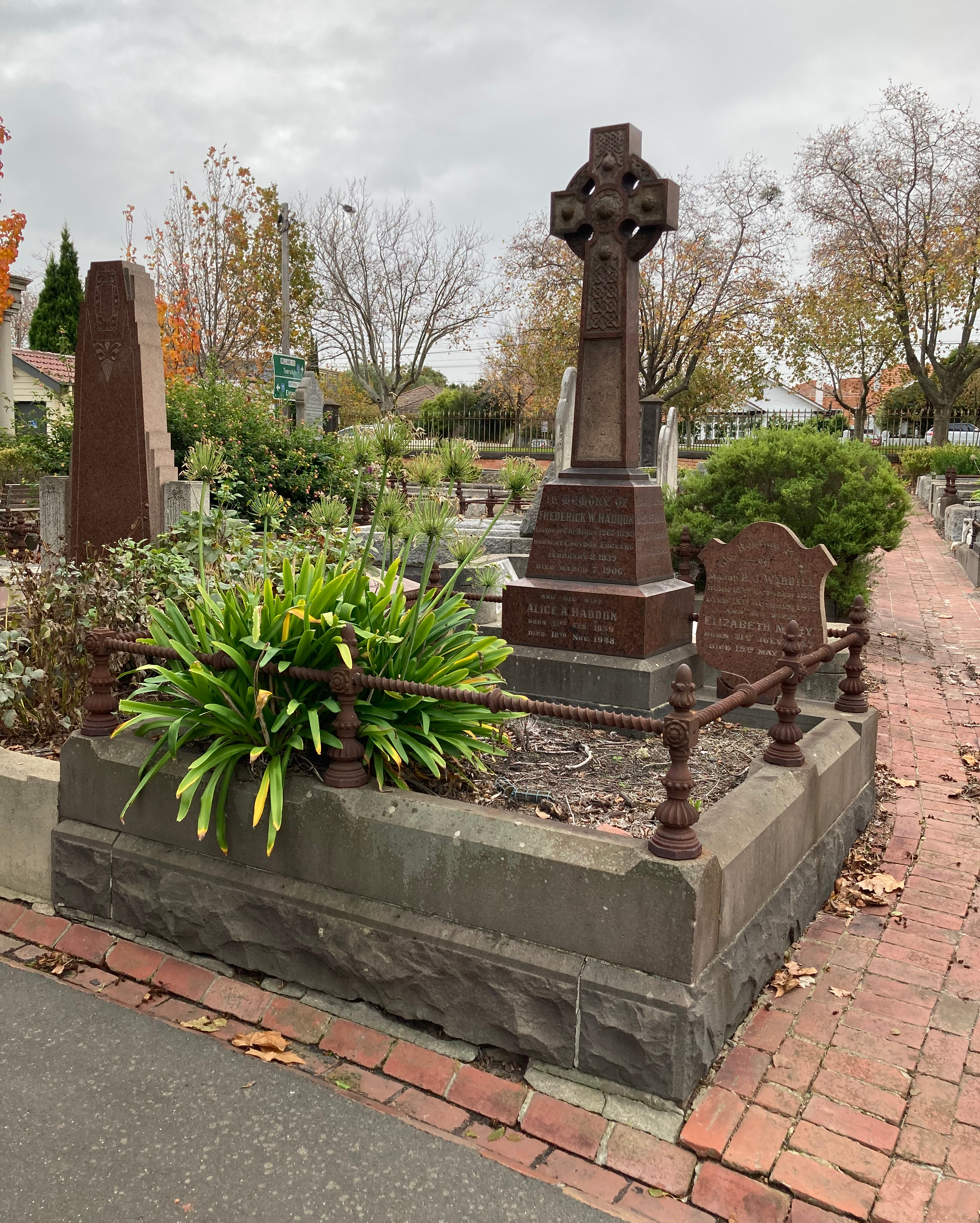
Haddon's grave at St Kilda Cemetery

Haddon was Melbourne correspondent for The Times in 1895–1903, and was president of the Victorian Poultry and Kennel Club. Haddon died at Melbourne on 7 March 1906, and was buried at St Kilda Cemetery. He was married twice: firstly to Annie Jane King (died 1875) and secondly to Alice Annie Good on 31 January 1883 who survived him with a daughter by the first marriage.
