= John Jenkins (Australian politician) =

American-Australian politician (1851–1923)

The Honourable John Jenkins
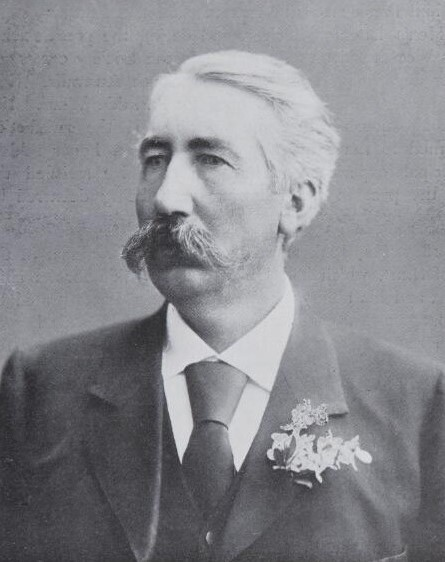

22nd Premier of South Australia
- In office 15 May 1901 – 1 March 1905
- Monarch: Edward VII
- Governor: Lord Tennyson; Sir George Le Hunte
- Preceded by: Frederick Holder
- Succeeded by: Richard Butler

Personal details
- Born: 8 September 1851 Pennsylvania, U.S.
- Died: 22 February 1923 (aged 71) London, England, UK
- Party: Liberals

John Greeley (Note: Though presumably named for Horace Greeley, Jenkins's middle name was spelled "Greely" just as frequently, sometimes with both versions in the same paragraph.) Jenkins (8 September 1851 – 22 February 1923) was an American-Australian politician. He was Premier of South Australia from 1901 to 1905. He had previously served as Minister for Education and the Northern Territory and Commissioner for Public Works under Thomas Playford II, Commissioner of Public Works under Charles Kingston and Chief Secretary under Frederick Holder. He was subsequently Agent-General for South Australia from 1905 to 1908. He also played a major role in an agreement between the States about the River Murray, and in continuing attempts to develop the Northern Territory.

== History ==
Born in Susquehanna County, Pennsylvania, to Evan Jenkins and Mary Jenkins, née Davis, both originally from South Wales, Jenkins left his home state as a young man and for six years toured the US and Canada, before sailing to South Australia, arriving in Adelaide in April 1878. He was soon immersed in local affairs, becoming active in the South Australian Literary Societies' Union and its associated Union Parliament, also in local politics, being elected councillor for the Unley ward of the Adelaide council in December 1885. Two years later, he won the post of Chief Magistrate for the Town of Unley. His eyes were fixed on bigger prizes, however, and did not stand for reelection, instead offering himself as a member of the House of Assembly, winning one of the Sturt seats in the general election of 1887.

As chief secretary in Holder's government, he was also minister for defence and had responsibility for the four South Australian contingents to the South African War. Taking over from Holder, Jenkins was premier from 1901 to 1905 and through the 1902 election, and was succeeded as liberal leader by Archibald Peake, who would allow Labor to form government at the 1905 election. Peake would form the Liberal and Democratic Union for the 1906 election.

== Other interests ==
Jenkins was an enthusiastic Mason, and one of the founders and Worshipful Masters of the Leopold Lodge.

After leaving politics, he was an active member of the South Australian Literary Societies' Union and in 1884 the first Premier of the associated Union Parliament.

== See also ==
- Hundred of Jenkins

== Notes ==
Political offices
Preceded by William Rounsevell	Commissioner of Public Works; 1892	Succeeded by Andrew Handyside
Preceded by Frederick Holder	Commissioner of Public Works; 1894–1899	Succeeded by Andrew Handyside
Preceded by Frederick Holder	Premier of South Australia; 1899–1905	Succeeded by Richard Butler
Parliament of South Australia
Preceded by Josiah Symon	Member for Sturt; 1887–1902; Served alongside: William Stock, Thomas Price	Succeeded by Electorate abolished
Preceded by New district	Member for Torrens; 1902–1905; Served alongside: John Darling Jr., George Soward, Thomas Price, Frederick Coneybeer	Succeeded by George Dankel
Diplomatic posts
Preceded by Henry Allerdale Grainger	Agent-General for South Australia; 1905–1908	Succeeded by Andrew Kirkpatrick
