= William MacGregor =

Scottish doctor and government administrator

The Right Honourable Sir William MacGregor GCMG CB AM FRSGS
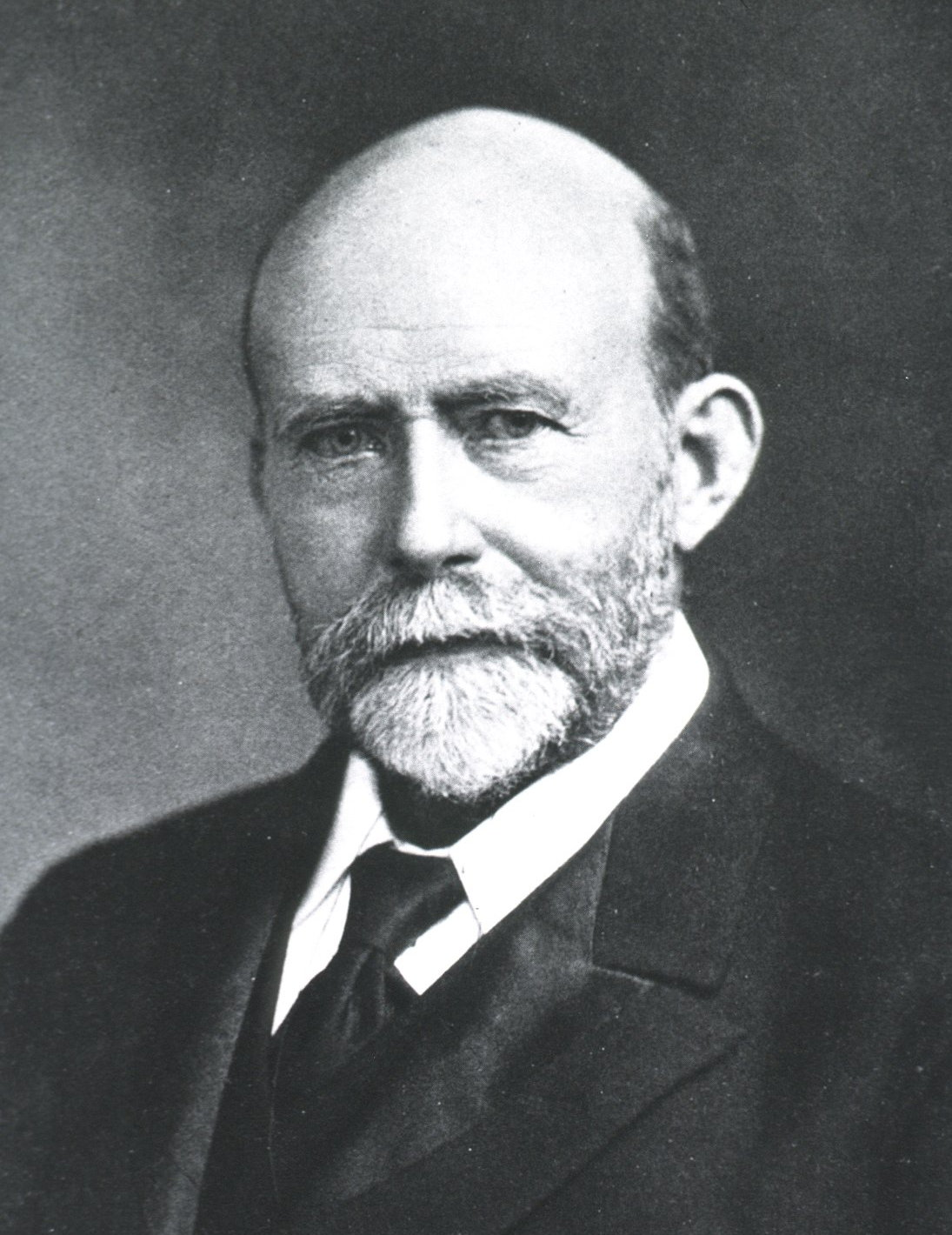

11th Governor of Queensland
- In office 2 December 1909 – 16 July 1914
- Monarchs: Edward VII; George V
- Preceded by: The Lord Chelmsford
- Succeeded by: Sir Hamilton Goold-Adams

60th Governor of Newfoundland
- In office 1904–1909
- Monarch: Edward VII
- Prime Minister: Robert Bond
- Preceded by: Charles Cavendish Boyle
- Succeeded by: Sir Ralph Champneys Williams

Governor of Lagos Colony
- In office 1899–1902
- Monarchs: Victoria; Edward VII
- Preceded by: Henry Edward McCallum
- Succeeded by: Walter Egerton

Lieutenant-Governor of British New Guinea
- In office 1895–1897
- Monarch: Victoria
- Preceded by: Himself as Administrator of British New Guinea
- Succeeded by: George Le Hunte

Administrator of British New Guinea
- In office 1888–1895
- Monarch: Victoria
- Preceded by: John Douglas
- Succeeded by: Himself as Lieutenant-Governor of British New Guinea

Personal details
- Born: 20 October 1846 Towie, Aberdeenshire, Scotland, United Kingdom
- Died: 3 July 1919 (aged 72) Berwickshire, Scotland, United Kingdom
- Spouse: Mary Jane Cocks (1883–1919; his death)
- Education: University of Aberdeen; University of Edinburgh

Viceregal styles of Sir William MacGregor
- Reference style: His Excellency
- Spoken style: Your Excellency

Sir William MacGregor, GCMG, CB, AM, PC, FRSGS (20 October 1846 – 3 July 1919) was a Scottish colonial administrator who was Lieutenant-Governor of British New Guinea, Governor of Lagos Colony, Governor of Newfoundland and Governor of Queensland.

== Early life ==
MacGregor was born in Hillockhead, parish of Towie, Aberdeenshire, Scotland, the eldest son of John MacGregor, a crofter, and his wife Agnes, daughter of William Smith of Pitprone. MacGregor was educated at the school at the Strathmore manse, later a teacher at Tillyduke and worked as a farm labourer. Encouraged by his schoolmaster and the local doctor who recognised MacGregor's ability, he entered Aberdeen Grammar School in April 1866 and enrolled at the University of Aberdeen in October 1867. He graduated MB and CM of Aberdeen University in 1872, and obtained his MD in 1874. MacGregor also studied at Anderson's Medical College (LFPS) and the University of Edinburgh (LRCP). MacGregor then became a medical assistant at the Royal Lunatic Asylum, Aberdeen.

== Administrator and governor ==
MacGregor was described as 'sincere, discriminating, and courageous'. A linguist, MacGregor spoke Italian, French, and German; in one instance when with the Austrian Archduke Ferdinand (1863–1914) in the Territory of Papua, he translated from a German officer to the Italian cook on instructions to cook a wallaby.

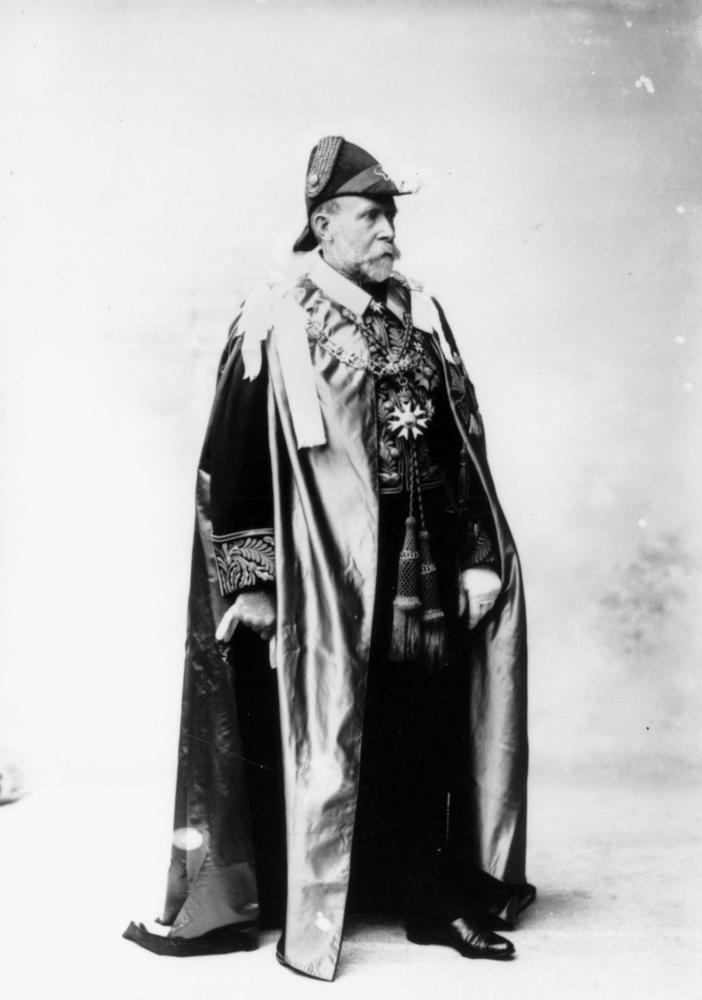
Sir William MacGregor in ceremonial mantle as Governor of Queensland

=== Newfoundland (1904–1909) ===
During his term MacGregor saw a general election where two political parties were returned in equal number. The premier Sir Robert Bond sought a dissolution before the House had sat. MacGregor refused. At the House's first sitting, Bond made an unsuccessful motion to nominate a Speaker, then demanded a dissolution. Having suffered a defeat, Governor MacGregor suggested Bond should resign. Sir Edward Morris went to form a ministry, also suffered a majority defeat for chair. With a second general election, Morris was returned with a good majority. MacGregor's actions were approved by many authorities on the subject.

=== Queensland (1909–1914) ===
On 2 December 1909 MacGregor was appointed Governor of Queensland.

On Saturday, 28 June 1913, going to Townsville in northern Queensland, as a pioneer of tropical medicine himself, Governor MacGregor formally opened the new £2,757 two-storey building for the Institute of Tropical Medicine. The building (now heritage-listed) at Clifton Street was close and to the west of the general hospital. The Institute had been in existence for several years prior, and the Governor had visited the facility several times prior.

He chaired the inaugural meeting of the Historical Society of Queensland in August 1913 and became its patron.

MacGregor retired in July 1914 from the governorship.

== Later life ==
He married in 1883 to Mary Jane, daughter of Levuka (Fiji) harbourmaster Captain Robert and Annie Cocks; who survived him with one son and three daughters. They met when he was the Administrator of British New Guinea. She was reported to have been the first Caucasian female born in Fiji. Two of the daughters were given to be born in Fiji. Lady MacGregor had nearly lost her life to fever on her first visit to her husband when he was the Governor of the Lagos Colony.

He was created a Companion of the Order of St Michael and St George in 1881, advanced to Knight Commander of the Order of St Michael and St George in 1889, made a Companion of the Order of the Bath in 1897, upgraded to Knight Grand Cross of the Order of St Michael and St George in 1907, and was made a privy councillor in 1914. He had the honorary degrees of DSc Cambridge, and LL.D. Aberdeen, Edinburgh, and Queensland.

In 1914 MacGregor retired and went to live on the estate 'Chapel-on-Leader' (near the River Leader, half-way between Lauder and Earlston, Berwickshire, Scotland).

MacGregor found his final year to be 'sorrowful', with the deaths of his son-in-law Admiral Sir Alfred Paget on 17 June 1918 of bronchitis, and Paget's wife and MacGregor's daughter Alpina 'Viti' Paget on 13 September 1918. After an operation for intestinal adhesions and gallstones MacGregor died on 3 July 1919, was cremated, and interred beside his parents in the churchyard of Towie, the village where he was born. Lady Mary MacGregor died in December 1919.

From his will, he bequeathed his ethnological and ornithological collections to the University of Aberdeen, and his banner from Saint Paul's Cathedral to the University of Queensland. In earlier years from his Papuan times, ethnological specimens were collected and presented to the Queensland Museum, bird specimens to the museum in Sydney, and a collection of flora to the botanical department in Melbourne; the latter indicated to have made the botanist Baron Von Mueller 'wildly enthusiastic'.

Two Australian suburbs are named after him: MacGregor, Brisbane, and Macgregor, Canberra.

Government offices
Preceded by John Douglas as Special Commissioner of British New Guinea	Administrator of British New Guinea; 1888–1895	Post abolished
New creation	Lieutenant-Governor of British New Guinea; 1895–1897	Succeeded by George Le Hunte
Preceded by Henry Edward McCallum	Governor of Lagos; 1899–1902	Succeeded by Walter Egerton
Preceded by Sir Cavendish Boyle	Governor of Newfoundland; 1904–1909	Succeeded by Sir Ralph Champneys Williams
Preceded by The Lord Chelmsford	Governor of Queensland; 1909–1914	Succeeded by Sir Hamilton John Goold-Adams
