= Austral Society =

The Austral Society was founded in 1903 due to the influence of The Toowoomba poet George Essex Evans to promote Australian Arts and Culture. The Society ceased in 1911.

== History ==
The Society purchased part of the closed Toowoomba Gaol grounds and let a tender to roof part of the goal yard in September 1904. The Austral Hall was built on this site.

The plaque located at 84 to 88 Margaret Street (Park Motor Inn) reads:

On this site stood the Austral Hall which was reported capable of accommodating 500 stage performers and an audience of 5,000.

Toowoomba’s Austral Society was founded by George Essex Evans in 1903 for the promotion and advancement of music, literature, art and science. The Society bought the site of the former gaol (1864–1904) and Architect William Hodgen designed the building using three remaining outer walls. The roof was supported by cast iron columns made by the Toowoomba Foundry.

The Hall was officially opened on 5 November 1904 by Sir Hugh Nelson, Lieutenant Governor of Queensland.

A few other Australian towns (Bundaberg, Belgrave) also erected a communal use Arts & Culture building called Austral Hall.
