= George Le Hunte =

British politician

Sir George Le Hunte GCMG
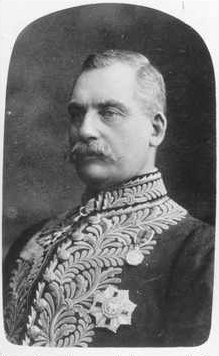

15th Governor of South Australia
- In office 1 July 1903 – 18 February 1909
- Monarch: Edward VII
- Premier: John Jenkins(1903–05); Richard Butler (1905); Thomas Price (1905–09)
- Preceded by: Lord Tennyson
- Succeeded by: Sir Day Bosanquet

Personal details
- Born: 20 August 1852
- Died: 29 January 1925 (aged 72)

Sir George Ruthven Le Hunte GCMG (20 August 1852 – 29 January 1925) was a British politician. He served as Governor of South Australia soon after the Federation of Australia, from 1 July 1903 until 18 February 1909.

== Life ==
He was born in Porthgain, Pembrokeshire, Wales, the son of George and Mary Le Hunte. He was educated at Eton College and Trinity College, Cambridge.

Le Hunte served as President of Dominica (1887–94), secretary of Barbados (1894–97) and Mauritius (1897); and Lieutenant-Governor of British New Guinea (1899–1903). He was Governor of South Australia from 1903–08/9, and then Governor of Trinidad and Tobago from 1908 to 1915, retiring in 1916.

As South Australian Governor, Le Hunte became the first patron of the Royal Automobile Association of South Australia when it was formed in 1903. The District Council of Le Hunte in the north of Eyre Peninsula was named after him before it was changed to Wudinna District Council in 2008.

== Family ==
George Le Hunte married Caroline Rachel Clowes (c. 1854 – 18 May 1939) on 14 February 1884; she was a cousin of Evelyn May Clowes. They had two children:

- John Le Hunte (11 August 1886 – ) married Vera Spurgin, daughter of John Henry Spurgin, on 12 August 1913. While there were reports of his being killed in action early in World War I, he was a prisoner of war; during World War II he worked in the Air Ministry.
- Editha Rachel Le Hunte (c. October 1892 – ) married Godfrey Barton Pease (15 May 1887 – ) on 5 October 1912. Details of his death in WWI have also been hard to find. Other reports indicate they both survived to 1919 at least.

- Lt.-Col. Godfrey Philip Desmond Pease (19 September 1913 – 8 March 2007)
- Ann Pease ( – ) married Lt.-Col. William Eliott Lockhart

Government offices
Preceded by James Meade	President of Dominica; 1887–1894	Succeeded by Edward Baynes (acting)
Preceded by Sir William MacGregor	Lieutenant-Governor of British New Guinea; 1898–1903	Succeeded by Christopher Stansfield Robinson (acting Administrator)
Preceded by Hallam Tennyson, 2nd Baron Tennyson	Governor of South Australia; 1903–1909	Succeeded by Admiral Sir Day Hort Bosanquet
Preceded by Sir Henry Moore Jackson	Governor of Trinidad and Tobago; 1909–1916	Succeeded by Sir John Robert Chancellor
