= 1822 in Australia =

- Decades: 1800s; 1810s; 1820s; 1830s; 1840s
- See also: Other events of 1822; Timeline of Australian history

The following lists events that happened during 1822 in Australia.

== Incumbents ==
- Monarch - George IV

=== Governors ===
Governors of the Australian colonies:

- Governor of New South Wales- Major-General Sir Thomas Brisbane
- Lieutenant-Governor of Tasmania - Colonel William Sorell

== Events ==
- 1 January – The Royal Agricultural Society of Tasmania was founded.
- 24 August – The Victorine a schooner under command of Captain William Risk, left Sydney bound for Mauritius. Carrying a crew of seven or eight the ship disappeared en route and was presumed lost.
- 5 July – The Royal Agricultural Society of New South Wales was founded.
- October – The Royal Hobart Show is first held.
- 24 December – Reverend Archibald Macarthur, Hobart's first Presbyterian minister arrived in Australia and held his first service on 12 January the following year.
- John Bigge's first report on all aspects of the colonial government, then under the governorship of Lachlan Macquarie, including finances, the church and the judiciary, and the convict system, was published.
