= 1828 in Australia =

- Decades: 1800s; 1810s; 1820s; 1830s; 1840s
- See also: Other events of 1828; Timeline of Australian history

The following lists events that happened during 1828 in Australia.

== Incumbents ==
- Monarch – George IV

=== Governors ===
Governors of the Australian colonies:

- Governor of New South Wales - Ralph Darling
- Lieutenant-Governor of Tasmania - Colonel George Arthur
- Lieutenant-Governor of Western Australia as a Crown Colony - Captain James Stirling

== Events ==
- 13 September - Robbers break into the vault of the Bank of Australasia in Sydney - first bank robbery in Australia.
- 10 November - Charles Sturt and Hamilton Hume trace the course of the Macquarie River.

=== Undated ===
- Australia's first postman, a private servant of George Panton, is appointed Sydney Postmaster.

== Exploration and settlement ==
- Charles Sturt charts the Darling River.
- Batemans Bay, New South Wales surveyed.
- Henry Rous, in charge of HMS Rainbow, discovers, names and explores the Richmond River.

== Census ==
Australia's first census was held in November 1828 in the colony of New South Wales. Previous government statistical reports had been taken from "musters" where inhabitants were brought together for counting. In 1828, the white population was 36,598 of whom 20,870 were free and 15,728 were convicts. 23.8% of the population were born in the colony. 24.5% were women. There were 25,248 Protestants and 11,236 Catholics. Indigenous Australians were not counted.

Of the 36,598, 638 were living in what is now Queensland. There were also 18,128 people in Tasmania.
