= 1814 in Australia =

- Decades: 1790s; 1800s; 1810s; 1820s; 1830s
- See also: Other events of 1814; Timeline of Australian history

The following lists events that happened during 1814 in Australia.

== Incumbents ==
- Monarch – George III

=== Governors ===
Governors of the Australian colonies:

- Governor of New South Wales – Lachlan Macquarie
- Lieutenant-Governor of Van Diemen's Land – Major Thomas Davey

== Events ==
- 31 January – The "holey dollar" and "dump" go into circulation.
- 4 February
  - The Court of Civil Jurisdiction is abolished by the Second Charter of Justice; it was replaced by the Supreme Court of Civil Judicature of New South Wales. The court had jurisdiction to deal with civil disputes where the amount in dispute in the colony was more than £50 sterling.
  - The Governors Court is established by Letters Patent dated 4 February 1814 issued by King George III. The court had jurisdiction over civil claims in New South Wales.
  - The Lieutenant Governor's Court is established by Letters Patent dated 4 February 1814 issued by King George III. The court had jurisdiction over civil claims in Van Diemen's Land.
- 20 May – The convict transport ship Three Bees catches fire and blows up in Sydney Harbour.
- Anglesea Barracks is established.

== Births ==
- 3 March – Louis Buvelot
- Date unknown: Robert Richard Torrens

== Deaths ==
- 8 May – Francis Grose
- 19 July – Matthew Flinders
- 31 August – Admiral Arthur Phillip RN, British naval officer and former Governor of New South Wales, dies at Bath, England aged 75.
