= 1813 in Australia =

- Decades: 1790s; 1800s; 1810s; 1820s; 1830s
- See also: Other events of 1813; Timeline of Australian history

1813 in Australia featured a number of important developments. Gregory Blaxland, William Lawson and William Charles Wentworth crossed the Blue Mountains which opened up the interior of New South Wales for European settlement. John and Elizabeth Macarthur sent the first wool exports from their properties.

== Incumbents ==
- Monarch – George III

=== Governors ===
Governors of the Australian colonies:

- Governor of New South Wales – Lachlan Macquarie
- Lieutenant-Governor of Van Diemen's Land – Major Thomas Davey

== Events ==
- 4 February – Major Thomas Davey succeeds David Collins as Lieutenant-Governor of Van Diemen's Land.
- 6 July – The first commercial shipment of wool sent to Britain by John and Elizabeth Macarthur.

== Exploration and settlement ==
- 31 May – Gregory Blaxland, William Lawson and William Charles Wentworth reach Mount Blaxland marking the end of the first successful expedition across the Blue Mountains.
- 19 November – George William Evans, assistant surveyor, set out to confirm the earlier discoveries of Blaxland, Lawson and Wentworth.
- 7 December – The Macquarie River is discovered by George Evans.

== Births ==
- 23 January – Charles Harpur, poet
- 7 June – Redmond Barry born in Ireland, the judge who sentenced Ned Kelly.
