= 1831 in Australia =

- Decades: 1810s; 1820s; 1830s; 1840s; 1850s
- See also: Other events of 1831; Timeline of Australian history

The following lists events that happened during 1831 in Australia.

The year of the Ripon Land Grant, which attracted many settlers to Australia.

== Incumbents ==
- Monarch - William IV

=== Governors ===
Governors of the Australian colonies:

- Governor of New South Wales - Ralph Darling (to 23 October).
- Governor of New South Wales - Major-General Sir Richard Bourke (from 23 October).
- Lieutenant-Governor of Tasmania - Colonel George Arthur
- Lieutenant-Governor of Western Australia as a Crown Colony - Captain James Stirling (from 4 March)

== Events ==
- 4 March - James Stirling commissioned as Lieutenant-Governor of Western Australia, rectifying the absence of a legal instrument providing the authority detailed in Stirling's Instructions of 30 December 1828.
- 14 March - The Surprise, the first paddle steamer built in Australia, was launched in Sydney.
- 18 April - The Sydney daily newspaper and Australia's oldest newspaper The Sydney Morning Herald is first published.
- May - Arrival of the paddle steamer Sophia Jane from England. The ship was the first paddle steamer to operate in the coastal waters of New South Wales.
- 5 August – Edward Broughton, an English convict turned serial killer and bushranger is hanged after he escaped from Sarah Island in Macquarie Harbour with four other convicts and later confessed to murdering three of his companions and resorting to cannibalism.
- 10 December - The Australian Agricultural Company opened Australia's first "railed way", a funicular that started at the intersection of Brown Street and Church Street, Newcastle.
- The Ripon Land Regulation Act provides land grants.

== Arts and literature ==
- Australia's first novel, Quintus Servinton: A Tale founded upon Incidents of Real Occurrence was written and published in Tasmania . It was written by the convicted English forger Henry Savery and published anonymously.

== Births ==
- Lewis Bernays
- James Boucaut
- William John Clarke
- William Bede Dalley
- John Darling
- Alfred Felton
- Walter Russell Hall
- Laurence Halloran
- Robert Herbert
- Adelaide Ironside
- Martin Howy Irving
- Patrick Jennings
- George Kerferd
- Duncan McIntyre
- Thomas Petrie
- Frederick Pottinger
- Henry Gyles Turner

== Deaths ==
- 5 August – Edward Broughton, bushranger and serial killer (b. 1803), hanged
- 22 December – Charles Fraser, botanist (b. 1788)
- Collet Barker
- John Hayes
