= 1835 in Australia =

- Decades: 1810s; 1820s; 1830s; 1840s; 1850s
- See also: Other events of 1835; Timeline of Australian history

The following lists events that happened during 1835 in Australia.

== Incumbents ==
- Monarch - William IV

=== Governors ===
Governors of the Australian colonies:

- Governor of New South Wales – Major-General Sir Richard Bourke.
- Lieutenant-Governor of Tasmania – Colonel George Arthur
- Governor of Western Australia as a Crown Colony – Captain James Stirling

== Events ==
- 12 April – British ship George III, transporting male convicts from Woolwich to Hobart sinks in D'Entrecasteaux Channel with the loss of around 134 (128 convicts) of the 294 people on board.
- 13 May – British barque Neva, transporting female convicts from Cork, Ireland, is wrecked in the Bass Strait with the loss of 224 people and only 15 survivors.
- 6 June – Batman's Treaty is created between John Batman and Wurundjeri elders to secure the land around Port Phillip Bay for the establishment of Melbourne. The treaty was later declared void by the Governor of New South Wales, Richard Bourke.
- 6 August – Proclamation of Governor Bourke, a document which formally declared that the British Crown, relying on the doctrine of terra nullius, owned the whole of the continent of Australia.
- 13 September - John Bede Polding, the first Catholic bishop in Australia, arrives in Sydney.
- 10 October – The Proclamation of Governor Bourke is approved by the Colonial Office. Bourke's proclamation implemented the doctrine of terra nullius by proclaiming that Indigenous Australians could not sell or assign land, nor could an individual person acquire it, other than through distribution by the Crown.
- 29 December – Mary Gilbert gives birth to her son, James Port Phillip Gilbert, the first European child born in the Port Phillip settlement of Melbourne.

== Births ==
- 1 March – Sir Philip Fysh, 12th Premier of Tasmania (born in the United Kingdom) (d. 1919)
- 31 March – William Hodgkinson, Queensland politician, explorer and journalist (born in the United Kingdom) (d. 1900)
- 17 May – Sir Thomas McIlwraith, 8th Premier of Queensland (born in the United Kingdom) (d. 1900)
- 17 June – James Brunton Stephens, poet (born in the United Kingdom) (d. 1902)
- 1 July – Sir Samuel McCaughey, New South Wales politician, pastoralist and philanthropist (born in Ireland) (d. 1919)
- 19 August – Tom Wills, Australian rules footballer (Melbourne) and cricketer (d. 1880)
- 24 August – Sir Peter Scratchley, military officer and administrator (born in France) (d. 1885)
- 3 September – George Stanton, bishop (born in the United Kingdom) (d. 1905)
- 1 November – Matthew Gibney, bishop (born in Ireland) (d. 1925)
- 2 November – Simpson Newland, South Australian politician, pastoralist and author (born in the United Kingdom) (d. 1925)
- 10 December – Sir Normand MacLaurin, New South Wales politician and physician (born in the United Kingdom) (d. 1914)

== Deaths ==
- 11 March – Elizabeth Macquarie, settler (born and died in the United Kingdom) (b. 1778)
- 11 August – George Clarke, bushranger (born in the United Kingdom) (b. 1803), hanged
