= 1840 in Australia =

- Decades: 1820s; 1830s; 1840s; 1850s; 1860s
- See also: Other events of 1840; Timeline of Australian history

The following lists events that happened during 1840 in Australia.

== Incumbents ==
- Monarch - Victoria

=== Governors ===
Governors of the Australian colonies:

- Governor of New South Wales – Sir George Gipps
- Governor of South Australia – Lieutenant Colonel George Gawler
- Governor of Tasmania – Captain Sir John Franklin
- Governor of Western Australia as a Crown Colony – John Hutt

== Events ==
- 3 January – The Melbourne newspaper The Herald is founded by George Cavenagh as The Port Phillip Herald.
- 13 January – The Battle of Yering occurs between Indigenous Australians of the Wurundjeri nation and the Border Police.
- March – Between 40 and 60 Jardwadjali Aboriginal people are killed in the Fighting Hills massacre. The Whyte brothers William, George, Pringle and James Whyte, cousin John Whyte and three convict employees, Benjamin Wardle, Daniel Turner and William Gillespie were responsible.
- April – Up to 60 Jardwadjali Aboriginal people are killed in the Fighting Waterholes massacre. The Whyte brothers William, George, Pringle and James Whyte and their employees were responsible.
- May – British Government agrees to cease sending convicts to New South Wales, some 80,000 convicts had been sent since 1788. Convicts still sent to Van Diemen's Land and Port Phillip District colonies.
- 30 June – survivors of the Maria shipwreck are massacred by Aboriginal Australians on the Coorong.
- 25 August – Two Ngarrindjeri men are hanged on the Coorong in front of their tribe after being convicted in a drumhead court-martial of the murders of all 26 crew and passengers of the Maria shipwreck, Major Thomas O'Halloran, South Australian Police Commissioner, presiding and passing sentence.
- 11 October – the Lettsom raid in Melbourne, the mass-arrest and imprisonment of approximately 400 Wurundjeri, Woiworrung, Boonwurrung and Taungurung people (collectively known as the Kulin nation of Indigenous Australians).
- 2 November – Construction of The Causeway across the Swan River in Perth begins.
- Undated – Sydney City Council and Adelaide City Council are incorporated. A ratepayer required £1,000 worth of property to stand for election.
- Undated – An unknown number of Indigenous Australians are murdered by Angus McMillan's men at Nuntin and at Boney Point as part of a series of mass murders of Gunai Kurnai people known as the Gippsland massacres.
- Undated – Aboriginals Fire Arm Regulation Act 1840 is enacted prohibiting 'Aboriginal Natives' of New South Wales from possessing fire arms or ammunition without the permission of a Magistrate.

== Births ==
- 3 February – Allan McLean, 19th Premier of Victoria (d. 1911)
- 11 March – Ralph Tate, botanist and geologist (born in the United Kingdom) (d. 1901)
- 26 April – Paddy Hannan, prospector (born in Ireland) (d. 1925)
- 23 May – George Throssell, 2nd Premier of Western Australia (d. 1910)
- 4 November – William Giblin, 13th Premier of Tasmania (d. 1887)
- 8 December – William Guilfoyle, landscape gardener and botanist (d. 1912)
- Unknown – Tommy Windich, explorer (d. 1876)

== Deaths ==
- 28 January – Simeon Lord, merchant and magistrate (born in the United Kingdom) (b. 1771)
- 17 November – Henry Fulton, chaplain and writer (born in Ireland) (b. 1761)
- 24 December – Thomas Moore, settler (born in the United Kingdom) (b. 1762)
