= 1815 in Australia =

- Decades: 1790s; 1800s; 1810s; 1820s; 1830s
- See also: Other events of 1815; Timeline of Australian history

The following events happened in Australia in the year 1815.

== Incumbents ==
- Monarch - George III

=== Governors ===
Governors of the Australian colonies:

- Governor of New South Wales – Lachlan Macquarie
- Lieutenant-Governor of Van Diemen's Land – Major Thomas Davey

== Events ==
- 14 January – The road over the Blue Mountains is completed to the Macquarie River.
- 7 April – Bathurst, New South Wales is founded following its discovery by George Evans. It is Australia's first inland European settlement.
- 12 December – Captain James Kelly sets out on circumnavigation of Tasmania, during which important observations are made on the resources of the west coast.
- A single ship carries 60,000 sealskins to London from Australia (a normal cargo contains at least 10,000 skins).

== Births ==
- 27 May – Henry Parkes
- 5 August – Edward John Eyre
- 7 September – John McDouall Stuart

== Deaths ==
- 9 January – Augustus Alt
- 10 November – Ellis Bent
- 11 November – Maurice Margarot
