= John Lillie (minister) =

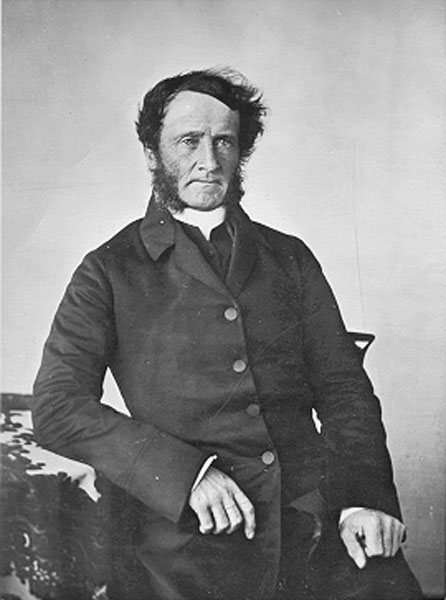
Rev. John Lillie D.D.

John Lillie (1806–1866) was a Scottish Presbyterian minister, educationist, and naturalist active in Hobart, Tasmania. Born to a Glasgow merchant and educated at the University of Glasgow, he came to Hobart in 1837 to succeed Archibald Macarthur as representative of the Church of Scotland there. From 1838 to 1954 he was president of the Hobart Mechanics' Institute where he gave popular annual lectures. He was also a fellow and honorary secretary of the Royal Society of Tasmania. In 1861 he removed to Christchurch, New Zealand, where he died on 15 January 1866.
