= 1816 in Australia =

- Decades: 1790s; 1800s; 1810s; 1820s; 1830s
- See also: Other events of 1816; Timeline of Australian history

The following lists events that happened during 1816 in Australia.

== Incumbents ==
- Monarch - George III

=== Governors ===
Governors of the Australian colonies:

- Governor of New South Wales – Lachlan Macquarie
- Lieutenant-Governor of Van Diemen's Land – Major Thomas Davey

== Events ==
- 1 January – The first public hospital, the Rum Hospital, is opened.
- 30 March – Francis Greenway is appointed as the government's Civil Architect.
- 1 June – Andrew Bent starts regular publication of the Hobart Town Gazette and Southern Reporter.
- 2 December – John Oxley allots the first land grants in the Illawarra district.
- The Royal Botanic Garden, Sydney is opened. The overall structure and key elements of the garden were designed by Charles Moore and Joseph Maiden, and various other elements designed and built under the supervision of Allan Cunningham, Richard Cunningham, and Carrick Chambers. The garden is the oldest scientific institution in Australia.

== Births ==
- 27 February – William Nicholson, 3rd Premier of Victoria (born in the United Kingdom) (d. 1865)
- 12 April – Sir Charles Gavan Duffy, 8th Premier of Victoria (born in the United Kingdom) (d. 1903)
- 7 October – Edward Hargraves, gold prospector (born in the United Kingdom) (d. 1891)
- 15 October – Sir John Robertson, 5th Premier of New South Wales (born in the United Kingdom) (d. 1891)
- 23 December – Thomas Sutcliffe Mort, industrialist (born in the United Kingdom) (d. 1878)
