= 1839 in Australia =

- Decades: 1810s; 1820s; 1830s; 1840s; 1850s
- See also: Other events of 1839; Timeline of Australian history

The following lists events that happened during 1839 in Australia.

== Incumbents ==
- Monarch – Victoria

=== Governors ===
Governors of the Australian colonies:

- Governor of New South Wales – Sir George Gipps
- Governor of South Australia – Lieutenant Colonel George Gawler
- Governor of Tasmania – Sir John Franklin
- Governor of Western Australia – Captain James Stirling then John Hutt

== Events ==
- 3 January – John Hutt becomes Governor of Western Australia
- 15 January – The first US consul, J. H. Williams, takes residence in Sydney
- 6 February – The Port Phillip Patriot and Melbourne Advertiser are published for the first time by John Pascoe Fawkner
- 16 February – Kiama is proclaimed a town
- 19 March – Settlement begins at Port Lincoln
- 3 April – William Light is replaced by Charles Sturt as Surveyor-General of South Australia
- 13 April – Albury is proclaimed a village
- 24 April – Braidwood is proclaimed a town
- 1 May – Edward John Eyre explores the area north of Adelaide until 29 June, during the expedition he discovers Lake Torrens
- June – Up to 40 Aboriginals are killed in the Campaspe Plains massacre, which was a reprisal raid against Aboriginal resistance to the invasion and occupation of the Dja Dja Wurrung and Taungurung lands.
- 20 June – A settlement is founded at Victor Harbor
- 27 July – The Adelaide River is discovered
- 9 September – Port Darwin is named by John Lort Stokes on HMS Beagle
- Undated (mid 1939) – 35 to 40 Aboriginals of the Tarnbeere Gundidj clan of the Djargurd Wurrung are killed in the Murdering Gully massacre.
- Undated – An unknown number of Aboriginals are killed in the Blood Hole massacre

== Exploration and settlement ==
- Edward John Eyre explores areas to the far north and west of Adelaide during his two expeditions.

=== Settlements ===
- Alberton, South Australia
- Albury, New South Wales
- Balhannah, South Australia
- Blakiston, South Australia
- Brunswick East, Victoria
- Burnside, South Australia
- Carcoar, New South Wales
- Findon, South Australia
- Gumeracha, South Australia
- Hahndorf, South Australia
- Hope Valley, South Australia
- Mandurama, New South Wales
- Mount Barker, South Australia
- Nairne, South Australia
- Penwortham, South Australia
- Seymour, Victoria
- St Kilda, Victoria
- Strathalbyn, South Australia
- Tusmore, South Australia

== Arts and literature ==
- First mechanics' institute was founded at Melbourne

== Births ==
- 14 March – George Adams, publican and lottery promoter (born in the United Kingdom) (d. 1904)
- 18 April – Henry Kendall, author and bush poet (d. 1882)
- 30 April – Sir Francis Suttor, New South Wales politician and pastoralist (d. 1915)
- 10 May – Thomas Joseph Carr, Catholic archbishop (born in Ireland) (d. 1917)
- 29 May – Ned Gregory, cricketer (d. 1899)
- 19 June – Howard Willoughby, journalist and war correspondent (born in the United Kingdom) (d. 1908)
- 1 July – William George Lawes, minister, missionary and public lecturer (born in the United Kingdom) (d. 1907)
- 2 September – Elias Solomon, Western Australian politician (born in the United Kingdom) (d. 1909)
- 9 December – Norman Selfe, civil engineer (born in the United Kingdom) (d. 1911)
- 19 December – Charles Dempster, Western Australian politician and explorer (d. 1907)
- Unknown – George Rignold, actor (born in the United Kingdom) (d. 1912)

== Deaths ==
- 6 May – John Batman, explorer, grazier and entrepreneur (b. 1801)
- 27 June – Allan Cunningham (botanist), botanist and explorer (born in the United Kingdom) (b. 1791)
- 24 July – Sir Richard Spencer, naval officer and settler (born in the United Kingdom) (b. 1779)
- 6 October – William Light, military officer and surveyor (born in Malaysia) (b. 1786)
- 9 October – James Oatley, watchmaker and convict (born in the United Kingdom) (b. 1769)
