= 1833 in Australia =

- Decades: 1810s; 1820s; 1830s; 1840s; 1850s
- See also: Other events of 1833; Timeline of Australian history

The following lists events that happened during 1833 in Australia.

== Events ==
- 5 January – The Perth Gazette and the West Australian Journal are first published by Charles Macfaull
- 23 January – Bathurst is gazetted as a town
- 1 May – Yagan and Midgegoroo are proclaimed as outlaws for killing two whites at Canning; Yagan is killed in July
- 23 October – The town of Mussel Brook (later Muswellbrook) is proclaimed

== Births ==
- 9 March – William Henry Groom, Queensland politician and newspaper proprietor (born in the United Kingdom) (d. 1901)
- 29 May – George Gordon McCrae, poet (born in the United Kingdom) (d. 1927)
- 10 August – Edward Devine, coach driver, hotelier and barman (d. 1908)
- 15 October – John Alexander MacPherson, 7th Premier of Victoria (d. 1894)
- 19 October – Adam Lindsay Gordon, South Australian politician and poet (born in the United Kingdom) (d. 1870)
- 18 November – Sir James Patterson, 17th Premier of Victoria (born in the United Kingdom) (d. 1895)

== Deaths ==
- 13 March – William Bradley, naval officer and cartographer (born in the United Kingdom and died in France) (b. 1758)
- 7 May – Watkin Tench, naval officer and author (born and died in the United Kingdom) (b. 1758)
- 17 July – William Redfern, surgeon (born in Ireland and died in the United Kingdom) (b. 1774)
- 27 September – John Palmer, administrator (born in the United Kingdom) (b. 1760)
- 11 November – James Grant, naval officer and navigator (born in the United Kingdom and died in France) (b. 1772)
- 17 November – Alexander Riley, merchant and pastoralist (born and died in the United Kingdom) (b. 1778)
