= 1817 in Australia =

- Decades: 1790s; 1800s; 1810s; 1820s; 1830s
- See also: Other events of 1817; Timeline of Australian history

The following lists events that happened during 1817 in Australia.

== Incumbents ==
- Monarch – George III

=== Governors ===
Governors of the Australian colonies:

- Governor of New South Wales – Lachlan Macquarie
- Lieutenant-Governor of Van Diemen's Land – Major Thomas Davey

== Events ==
- 7 March – Bible Society of New South Wales is formed.
- 8 April – Australia's first bank, the Bank of New South Wales is established.
- 10 October – Bushranger Michael Howe is caught in Van Diemen's Land, but escapes after killing his captors.
- 21 December – Lachlan Macquarie recommends the adoption of the name Australia for the continent instead of New Holland.
- 22 December – The King expedition of 1817, to explore and make a rough survey of the northern and north-west coasts of Australia, departs Sydney.
- Governor Lachlan Macquarie directs that a new fort, named Fort Macquarie, be built on a site at Bennelong Point.

== Births ==
- 6 July – James Bonwick
- 25 August – Edmund Blacket

== Deaths ==
- 7 December – William Bligh
