= 1836 in Australia =

- Decades: 1810s; 1820s; 1830s; 1840s; 1850s
- See also: Other events of 1836; Timeline of Australian history

The following lists events that happened during 1836 in Australia.

== Incumbents ==
- Monarch - William IV

=== Governors ===
Governors of the Australian colonies:

- Governor of New South Wales – Major-General Sir Richard Bourke
- Governor of South Australia – Captain John Hindmarsh
- Lieutenant-Governor of Tasmania – Colonel George Arthur
- Governor of Western Australia as a Crown Colony – Captain James Stirling

== Events ==
- 14 March – HMS Beagle, carrying Charles Darwin, leaves Australia.
- 27 May – At least 7 Aboriginal are killed by Major Thomas Mitchell and his men in his third expedition as Surveyor General of New South Wales in the Mount Dispersion massacre.
- 29 July – Church Act enacted

== Exploration and settlement ==
- 27 July – Reeves Point (later Kingscote), South Australia's first official European settlement is founded on Kangaroo Island.
- 28 December – South Australia and Adelaide are founded.

== Births ==
- Thomas a Beckett
- Joseph Bancroft
- Robert Hamilton
- Henry Harrison
- Philip Sydney Jones
- David Scott Mitchell
- William Piguenit
- Henry Chamberlain Russell
- Samuel Way

== Deaths ==
- William Dawes
