= 1827 in Australia =

- Decades: 1800s; 1810s; 1820s; 1830s; 1840s
- See also: Other events of 1827; Timeline of Australian history

The following lists events that happened during 1827 in Australia.

== Incumbents ==
- Monarch – George IV

=== Governors ===
Governors of the Australian colonies:

- Governor of New South Wales - Lieutenant-General Ralph Darling
- Governor of Tasmania - Colonel George Arthur

== Events ==
- 5 January - First boat regatta held on the River Derwent. On 30 April a regatta was held in Sydney.
- Theatre Royal, Sydney opened.

== Exploration and settlement ==
- 18 June - James Stirling establishes the Fort Wellington settlement at Raffles Bay, on the Cobourg Peninsula, Northern Territory.

== Births ==
- 24 October – James Rutherford, transit pioneer (born in the United States) (d. 1911)
