= 1812 in Australia =

- Decades: 1790s; 1800s; 1810s; 1820s; 1830s
- See also: Other events of 1812; Timeline of Australian history

The following lists events that happened during 1812 in Australia.

== Incumbents ==
- Monarch – George III

=== Governors ===
Governors of the Australian colonies:

- Governor of New South Wales – Lachlan Macquarie
- Lieutenant-Governor of Van Diemen's Land – vacant

== Events ==
- 6 March – Two Wesleyan Methodist classes were established in Sydney by Thomas Bowden and John Hosking—the beginning of Methodism in Australia.
- 1 July – The settlements at Port Dalrymple and Hobart Town are merged into a single colony of Van Diemen's Land, administered from Hobart.
- 10 July – Publication of report of the first detailed inquiry into the convict system in Australia by a Select committee on Transportation. The committee supported Governor Macquarie's liberal policies in general. However, the committee thought that fewer ticket of leave should be issued and opposed the governor having the power to grant pardons. The committee concluded that the colony should be made as prosperous as possible so as to provide work for the convicts and to encourage them to become settlers after being given their freedom.
- 26 November – 70,000 Spanish dollars in coins arrive in New South Wales on the Royal Navy ship HMS Samarang. To prevent their use outside the colony, holes are punched though the centre of the coins to create "holey dollars"—Australia's first official currency.

== Births ==
- 13 January – Maurice O'Connell, soldier and politician
