= 1838 in Australia =

- Decades: 1810s; 1820s; 1830s; 1840s; 1850s
- See also: Other events of 1838; Timeline of Australian history

The following lists events that happened during 1838 in Australia.

== Incumbents ==
- Monarch - Victoria

=== Governors ===
Governors of the Australian colonies:

- Governor of New South Wales - Sir George Gipps
- Governor of South Australia - Captain John Hindmarsh to 16 July then from 17 October Lieutenant Colonel George Gawler
- Governor of Tasmania - Sir John Franklin
- Governor of Western Australia as a Crown Colony - Captain James Stirling

== Events ==
- 1 January - John Pascoe Fawkner founded The Melbourne Advertiser, the Port Phillip district's first newspaper.
- 26 January -
  - The 50th anniversary of the colony of New South Wales was celebrated with a regatta on Sydney Harbour and other festivities.
  - A surprise attack by mounted police attack on a Kamilaroi camp organised by the colonial government killing at least 40 people. Part of the Waterloo Creek massacre.
- 31 January - Lord Glenelg, Secretary of State for War and the Colonies sent Governor Gipps the report of the Select committee of the House of Commons on Aborigines (British Settlements). The report recommended that Protectors of Aborigines should be engaged. They would be required to learn the Aboriginal language and their duties would be to watch over the rights of Aborigines, guard against encroachment on their property and to protect them from acts of cruelty, oppression and injustice. The Port Phillip Aboriginal Protectorate was established with George Augustus Robinson as chief protector and four full-time protectors.
- 11 April - 20 Aboriginal Australians attacked 18 European settlers, killing 8 of them in the Battle of Broken River, also known as the Faithfull Massacre, sometimes spelt Faithful Massacre. Reprisals against the Aboriginal people continued for many years afterwards, killing up to 100 people.
- 23 April 1838 - The arrival of the first German vinedressers in Australia. The barque Kinnear arrived at Sydney carrying six German vinedresser families who were one of the first group of foreign immigrants brought to Australia under the newly formed Bounty Scheme. They were Caspar Flick, Georg Gerhard, Johann Justus, Friedrich Seckold, Johann Stein, and Johann Wenz. They brought with them the first Riesling grape cuttings to Australia and worked in the vineyards belonging to John Macarthur's son William Macarthur at Camden Park. Major Edward Macarthur recruited these six families from the Rheingau region of Hesse in October 1837.
- 24 May - David Jones opens its first store on the corner of George and Barrack Streets in Sydney
- June - 8 to 23 Djadjawurrung Aboriginal people were killed in a reprisal raid for the killing of two convict servants and theft of sheep in the Waterloo Plains massacre.
- 10–28 June - 28 Indigenous Australians were killed at the Myall Creek massacre.
- 15 November - The Melbourne Cricket Club is founded
- 16 November - The ship Bengalee arrived at Port Misery (South Australia) with a group of Prussian immigrants, the first in a large wave of 19th-century German immigration to Australia.
- 1 December - The first annual Hobart Regatta is held.
- Undated - Five nuns from the Religious Sisters of Charity in Ireland became the first women of religion to set foot on Australian soil.

== Arts and literature ==
- The Guardian: a tale published in Sydney by Anna Maria Bunn - the first Australian novel written by a woman

== Births ==
- 2 December - James Erskine, Commander-in-Chief, Australia Station
- 7 December - Thomas Bent, one of Australia's more colourful politicians, and Premier of Victoria, is born in Penrith, New South Wales.
- 15 December - John King, the sole survivor of the ill-fated Burke and Wills expedition, is born at Moy, County Tyrone, Ireland.
- Bernhardt Holtermann
- George Thorn
- Barcroft Boake
- Thomas Naghten Fitzgerald
- John Henry Nicholson
- John James Clark
- John Horbury Hunt

== Deaths ==
- 20 August – Joshua Gregory, Western Australian settler (b. 1790)
- 1 December – Thomas Pamphlett, convict and castaway (b. 1788)
- John Harris
- Samuel Terry
- Solomon Wiseman
- George Tobin
- Robert Knopwood
- Samuel Marsden

Aboriginals
