= 1805 in Australia =

- Decades: 1780s; 1790s; 1800s; 1810s; 1820s
- See also: Other events of 1805; Timeline of Australian history

The following lists events that happened during 1805 in Australia.

== Incumbents ==
- Monarch – George III

=== Governors ===
Governors of the Australian colonies:

- Governor of New South Wales – Captain Philip King
- Lieutenant-Governor of Southern Van Diemen's Land – David Collins
- Lieutenant-Governor of Northern Van Diemen's Land – William Paterson

== Events ==
- 24 May – William Bligh is appointed the fourth Governor of New South Wales for the salary of £2000 per year and £1000 pension. He arrives at Port Jackson to replace King on 6 August 1806.
- 8 June – John Macarthur returns to New South Wales as a civilian settler after the British Government accepts his resignation from the New South Wales Corps and approves his return.

== Exploration and settlement ==
- 15 February – Governor King instructed (apparently reluctantly) a surveyor to measure 5,000 acres (20 km^{2}) for John Macarthur at Cowpastures, where Macarthur had been promised land by the Secretary of State for War and the Colonies, Lord Camden. Macarthur named his property Camden Park in honour of his sponsor.
