= 1837 in Australia =

- Decades: 1810s; 1820s; 1830s; 1840s; 1850s
- See also: Other events of 1837; Timeline of Australian history

The following lists events that happened during 1837 in Australia.

== Incumbents ==
=== Governors ===
Governors of the Australian colonies:

- Governor of New South Wales - Major-General Sir Richard Bourke
- Governor of South Australia - Captain John Hindmarsh
- Lieutenant-Governor of Tasmania - Captain Sir John Franklin
- Governor of Western Australia as a Crown Colony - Captain James Stirling

== Events ==
- 2 January - The Supreme Court of South Australia is established by Letters Patent, five days after the founding of the colony.
- 6 March - The Theatre Royal in Hobart opened. It remains Australia's oldest working theatre.
- 28 March - The Hoddle Grid of streets for the central business district is surveyed by Robert Hoddle.
- 1 June - First inner-city land sale in Melbourne.
- 10 June - The first whale is caught in Western Australia.

== Births ==
- 13 February – James Venture Mulligan, prospector and explorer (born in Ireland) (d. 1907)
- 26 February – William Hann, pastoralist and explorer (born in the United Kingdom) (d. 1889)
- 7 March – Gracius Broinowski, artist and ornithologist (born in the Russian Empire) (d. 1913)
- 16 March – Frederick Wolseley, inventor and woolgrower (born in Ireland) (d. 1899)
- 1 May – Ernest Henry, explorer and pioneer grazier (born in the United Kingdom) (d. 1919)
- 9 May – Ben Hall, bushranger (d. 1865)
- 9 August – John Atherton, explorer (born in the United Kingdom) (d. 1913)
- 26 November – Thomas Playford II, 17th Premier of South Australia (born in the United Kingdom) (d. 1915)

== Deaths ==
- 10 February – Frederick Goulburn, New South Wales politician and soldier (born and died in the United Kingdom) (b. 1788)
- 15 March – William Cox, soldier, explorer and pioneer (born in the United Kingdom) (b. 1764)
- 5 September – James Ruse, farmer and convict (born in the United Kingdom) (b. 1759)
- Unknown, possibly September – Francis Greenway, architect and convict (born in the United Kingdom) (b. 1777)
- Unknown – Joseph Gellibrand, explorer and lawyer (born in the United Kingdom) (b. 1792)
