= 1834 in Australia =

- Decades: 1810s; 1820s; 1830s; 1840s; 1850s
- See also: Other events of 1834; Timeline of Australian history

The following lists events that happened during 1834 in Australia.

== Incumbents ==
- Monarch - William IV

=== Governors ===
Governors of the Australian colonies:

- Governor of New South Wales - Major-General Sir Richard Bourke
- Lieutenant-Governor of Tasmania - Colonel George Arthur
- Governor of Western Australia as a Crown Colony - Captain James Stirling

== Events ==
- 1 January – The Western Australian Police Force is formed.
- 14 January – The ten remaining convicts at the Macquarie Harbour Penal Station hijack a brig and escape to Chile in the Frederick escape
- 28 October – The Battle of Pinjarra occurs in the Swan River Colony in present-day Pinjarra, Western Australia. Between 14-40 Aborigines are killed by British colonists.
- 19 November – The first permanent European settlement on the north coast of Bass Strait is established at Portland by Edward Henty.

== Births ==
- 5 January – William John Wills, explorer (born in the United Kingdom) (d. 1861)
- 9 January – Roger Vaughan, archbishop (born in the United Kingdom) (d. 1883)
- 14 January – Duncan Gillies, 14th Premier of Victoria (born in the United Kingdom) (d. 1903)
- 25 February – Louisa Atkinson, writer, botanist and illustrator (d. 1872)
- 1 April – Arthur Orton, butcher (born in the United Kingdom) (d. 1898)
- 9 May – Peter Waite, pastoralist, businessman and philanthropist (born in the United Kingdom) (d. 1922)
- 25 May – John Tebbutt, astronomer (d. 1916)
- 30 May – Sir Frederick Sargood, Victorian politician (born in the United Kingdom) (d. 1903)
- 12 June – Christopher Augustine Reynolds, archbishop (born in Ireland) (d. 1893)
- 21 July – James Charles Cox, physician and conchologist (d. 1912)
- 29 September – Sir William Charles Windeyer, New South Wales politician and judge (born in the United Kingdom) (d. 1897)
- 12 October – Sir George Dibbs, 10th Premier of New South Wales (d. 1904)
- Unknown, possibly March – Patrick Durack, pastoralist and pioneer (born in Ireland) (d. 1898)

== Deaths ==
- 11 April – John Macarthur, New South Wales politician, pastoralist and officer (born in the United Kingdom) (b. 1767)
- 7 May – Billy Blue, convict and boatman (born in the United States) (b. 1767)
