= 1818 in Australia =

- Decades: 1790s; 1800s; 1810s; 1820s; 1830s
- See also: Other events of 1818; Timeline of Australian history

The following lists events that happened during 1818 in Australia.

== Incumbents ==
- Monarch – George III

=== Governors ===
Governors of the Australian colonies:

- Governor of New South Wales – Lachlan Macquarie
- Lieutenant-Governor of Van Diemen's Land – Colonel William Sorell

== Events ==
- 8 January – Governor Macquarie accuses Samuel Marsden of conspiracy against him
- 3 March – Throsby, Hume and Meehan discover an overland route to Jervis Bay
- 19 April – Phillip Parker King discovers Port Essington
- 28 May – John Oxley leaves Bathurst to explore along the Macquarie River
- 1 October – At least six Wodiwodi people (an Aboriginal people) are killed by nine European settlers in the Minnamurra River massacre.
- The Royal Tasmanian Botanical Gardens is first opened.

== Births ==
- 22 March – John Ainsworth Horrocks, pastoralist and explorer (born in the United Kingdom) (d. 1846)
- 21 May – S. T. Gill, artist (born in the United Kingdom) (d. 1880)
- 5 August - Sir Thomas Elder, South Australian politician and pastoralist (born in the United Kingdom) (d. 1897)
- 13 August – Edward Wise, New South Wales Supreme Court judge (born in the United Kingdom) (d. 1865)
- 5 September – Edmund Kennedy, explorer (born in the United Kingdom) (d. 1848)
- Unknown – Eliza Winstanley, stage actress and writer (born in the United Kingdom) (d. 1882)
