= 1825 in Australia =

- Decades: 1800s; 1810s; 1820s; 1830s; 1840s
- See also: Other events of 1825; Timeline of Australian history

The following lists events that happened during 1825 in Australia.

== Incumbents ==
- Monarch – George IV

=== Governors ===
Governors of the Australian colonies:

- Governor of New South Wales – Major-General Sir Thomas Brisbane
- Lieutenant-Governor of Tasmania – Colonel George Arthur

== Events ==
- 14 June – Van Diemen's Land is separated administratively from New South Wales.
- 3 December – Van Diemen's Land becomes fully independent from New South Wales. The Legislative Council of Tasmania is established and George Arthur, former Lieutenant-Governor, is promoted as its first Governor.

== Exploration and settlement ==
- 4 March – A penal settlement is established on Maria Island, Tasmania.
- Brisbane is founded.

== Deaths ==
- 25 February – Aboriginal bushranger, Musquito is hanged at Hobart.
- 7 December – John Ovens, explorer (b. 1788)
