= 1809 in Australia =

- Decades: 1780s; 1790s; 1800s; 1810s; 1820s
- See also: Other events of 1809; Timeline of Australian history

The following lists events that happened during 1809 in Australia.

== Incumbents ==
- Monarch – George III

== Events ==
- 25 April – First post office in Sydney established. Ex-convict Isaac Nichols is the first postmaster.
- 8 May – Lachlan Macquarie is officially appointed Governor of New South Wales, caretaker William Patterson governs until his appointment begins on 1 January 1810.
- 24 May – Lachlan Macquarie receives his commission as next governor of New South Wales, including instructions to reinstate Bligh temporarily on his arrival.

== Exploration and settlement ==
- Settlement began at O'Brien's bridge near the centre of present-day Glenorchy, Tasmania.

== Births ==
- 5 April – Arthur Edward Kennedy, Governor of Western Australia 1855-62 and Governor of Queensland 1877-1883
