= 1807 in Australia =

- Decades: 1780s; 1790s; 1800s; 1810s; 1820s
- See also: Other events of 1807; Timeline of Australian history

The following lists events that happened during 1807 in Australia.

== Incumbents ==
- Monarch – George III

=== Governors ===
Governors of the Australian colonies:

- Governor of New South Wales – Captain William Bligh
- Lieutenant-Governor of Southern Van Diemen's Land – David Collins
- Lieutenant-Governor of Northern Van Diemen's Land – William Paterson

== Events ==
- 23 August – The first dry cleaning business is opened in Sydney by Englishman Robert Davidson.

== Exploration and settlement ==
- 8 February – Lieutenant Thomas Laycock explores Van Diemen's Land, finding the Clyde River
