= 1826 in Australia =

- Decades: 1800s; 1810s; 1820s; 1830s; 1840s
- See also: Other events of 1826; Timeline of Australian history

The following lists events that happened during 1826 in Australia.

== Incumbents ==
- Monarch – George IV

=== Governors ===
Governors of the Australian colonies:

- Governor of New South Wales - Lieutenant-General Ralph Darling
- Governor of Tasmania - Colonel George Arthur

== Events ==
- 16 March - The Australian Subscription Library, the forerunner of the State Library of New South Wales, is founded; it opens, 1 December 1827.
- 25 December - Major Edmund Lockyer arrives at King George Sound to take possession of the western part of the continent, establishing a settlement near Albany.
- Convict Hospital built in Brisbane, it is replaced as Brisbane General Hospital in 1867.

== Science and technology ==
- 7 April – Australia's first street lamp erected in Macquarie Place, Sydney – it burned whale oil.

== Births ==
- 10 April – Henry Oxley, New South Wales MP
- 24 June – George Goyder, surveyor-general of South Australia.
- 7 July – Charles Todd responsible for the Australian Overland Telegraph Line.

== Deaths ==
- 4 May - Bushranger Matthew Brady is hanged.
