= 1808 in Australia =

- Decades: 1780s; 1790s; 1800s; 1810s; 1820s
- See also: Other events of 1808; Timeline of Australian history

The following lists events that happened during 1808 in Australia.

== Incumbents ==
- Monarch – George III

=== Governors ===
Governors of the Australian colonies:

- Governor of New South Wales – Captain William Bligh (until 26 January by no coincidence), then Major George Johnston (until 28 July), then Major Joseph Foveaux
- Lieutenant-Governor of Southern Van Diemen's Land – David Collins
- Lieutenant-Governor of Northern Van Diemen's Land – William Paterson (until 24 March)

== Events ==
- 26 January – John Macarthur is arrested sparking the Rum Rebellion. Military officers supporting Macarthur arrest Governor Bligh.
- 2 February – William Paterson sails to Sydney from Port Dalrymple, Van Diemen's Land to take over the administration of New South Wales following the removal of Bligh.

== Exploration and settlement ==
- First settlement at Kingston, Van Diemen's Land.

== Births ==
- 23 September – William Henty, one of the Henty brothers (although the only brother not to set foot in Portland, Victoria): he took a leading part in the legal disputes over the settlement.

== Deaths ==
- 19 June – Alexander Dalrymple, who had strongly opposed the establishment of New South Wales in A Serious Admonition to the Public on the Intended Thief-Colony at Botany Bay (London, 1786).
- 3 September – Philip Gidley King, third Governor of New South Wales.
