= 1820 in Australia =

- Decades: 1800s; 1810s; 1820s; 1830s; 1840s
- See also: Other events of 1820; Timeline of Australian history

The following lists events that happened during 1820 in Australia.

== Incumbents ==
- Monarch – George III until 29 January 1820 then George IV

=== Governors ===
Governors of the Australian colonies:

- Governor of New South Wales- Major-General Lachlan Macquarie
- Lieutenant-Governor of Tasmania – Colonel William Sorell

== Events ==
- 3 May – John Joseph Therry and Philip Conolly, the first Catholic priests officially appointed to Australia, arrive at Port Jackson from Ireland.
- 19 August – Joseph Wild discovers Lake George and names the Snowy Mountains.
- 28 October – Governor Macquarie names Lake George after King George III.
- 1 December – Campbelltown, New South Wales is established.
- Sydney has 1,084 buildings – mostly single-storey dwellings – and 12,079 people.
- Sheep population in Australia - 120,000.

== Births ==
- 14 May – James Martin (died 1886), Premier of New South Wales
