= 1830 in Australia =

- Decades: 1810s; 1820s; 1830s; 1840s; 1850s
- See also: Other events of 1830; Timeline of Australian history

The following lists events that happened during 1830 in Australia.

== Incumbents ==
- Monarch - George IV until 26 June 1830 then William IV

=== Governors ===
Governors of the Australian colonies:

- Governor of New South Wales - Ralph Darling
- Lieutenant-Governor of Tasmania - Colonel George Arthur
- Lieutenant-Governor of Western Australia as a Crown Colony - Captain James Stirling

== Events ==
- 20 September - The Port Arthur penal settlement was established.
- 23 September - The Bathurst Rebellion begins outside Bathurst, New South Wales, following the escape of a group of convicts known as the 'Ribbon Gang' under the leadership of convict-servant Ralph Entwistle. Ten of the rebels are later captured and publicly hung after being tried and found guilty of murder.
- 7 October - The 'Black Line' campaign of the Black War begins in an attempt to capture all Tasmanian Aborigines. The campaign lasts 7 weeks and only succeeds in bringing two Aborigines to the authorities.
- Wool becomes the most important export in Australia, surpassing whale oil.

Smallpox spread among the Aboriginal groups. It was received from the British people when they arrived in Australia. Aboriginals were persuaded to go to captivity in order for the disease to steady.

== Exploration and settlement ==
- February - Charles Sturt and party discover the mouth of the Murray River.

== Births ==
- 14 January – Thomas Hardy, winemaker (born in the United Kingdom) (d. 1912)
- 15 March – John Ferguson, Queensland politician (born in the United Kingdom) (d. 1906)
- 17 April – Alfred William Howitt, anthropologist, explorer, and naturalist (born in the United Kingdom) (d. 1908)
- 30 April – Dan Morgan, bushranger (d. 1865)
- 15 May – Louis Smith, Victorian politician (born in the United Kingdom) (d. 1910)
- 5 September – Robert Dunne, archbishop (born in Ireland) (d. 1917)
- 7 September – Charles Henry Pearson, Victorian politician, academic and writer (born in the United Kingdom) (d. 1894)
- 16 September – Francis Moran, Cardinal Archbishop of Sydney (born in Ireland) (d. 1911)
- 18 September – Sir Frederick Darley, 6th Chief Justice of New South Wales (born in Ireland) (d. 1910)
- 10 October – Freeman Cobb, businessman (born in the United States) (d. 1878)
- 30 November – Robert D. FitzGerald, explorer, ornithologist, and botanist (born in Ireland) (d. 1892)
- 4 December – Morton Allport, naturalist (born in the United Kingdom) (d. 1878)
- 5 December – Sir William Zeal, Victorian politician and railway engineer (born in the United Kingdom) (d. 1912)

== Deaths ==
- 24 November – Bungaree, explorer, entertainer, and community leader (b. 1775)
