= Charles Astor Bristed =

American scholar and author (1820–1874)

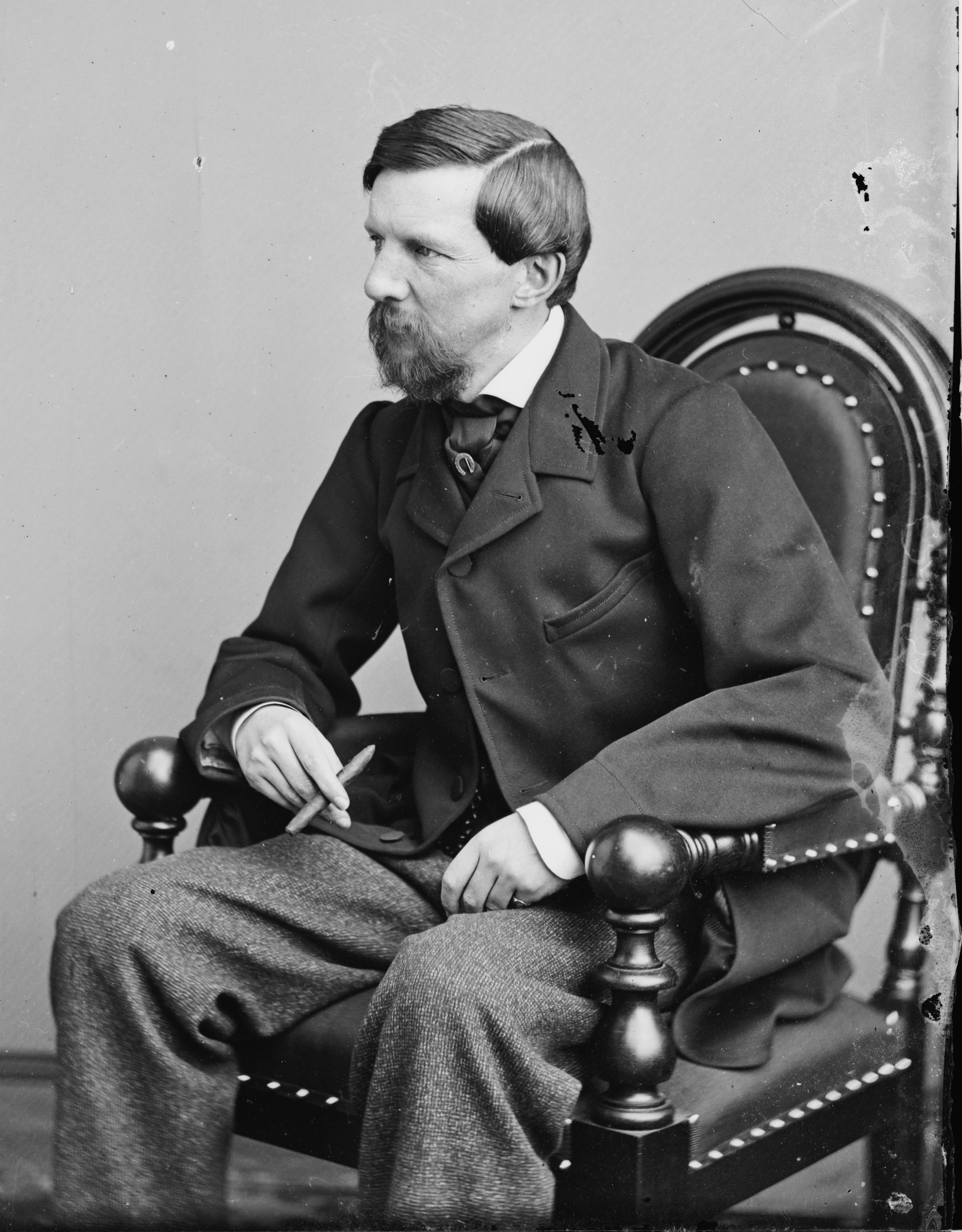
- Bristed sitting in a chair
- Born: October 6, 1820; New York City, New York, U.S.
- Died: January 14, 1874 (aged 53); Washington, D.C., U.S.
- Education: Yale College; Trinity College, Cambridge
- Occupations: Scholar, author
- Spouses: Laura Whetten Brevoort (m. 1847; died 1861) Grace Ashburner Sedgwick (m. 1867–1874)
- Children: 2
- Parent(s): John Bristed; Magdalena Astor
- Family: Astor family

Charles Astor Bristed (October 6, 1820 – January 14, 1874) was an American scholar and author, sometimes writing under the pen name Carl Benson. He was the first American to write a full-length defense of Americanisms and is the earliest known person to use the term "conspiracy theory".

== Biography ==
Charles was born in New York City, New York, the son of the Reverend John Bristed, an Episcopal clergyman from a New England family, and Magdalena Astor. After his mother's death in 1832, Charles went to live his with grandparents, fur-trader John Jacob Astor and Sarah Todd at their home, "Hellgate" where many famous writers of the day, including Washington Irving and Fitz-Greene Halleck, visited. His mother was the eldest child of John Jacob Astor and his maternal uncle was William Backhouse Astor Sr.

He graduated from Yale College in 1839 with honors, and from Trinity College, Cambridge, England, in 1845, taking numerous prizes and being made a foundation scholar of the college.

== Career ==
He returned to the United States in 1847. Bristed amused himself by contributing articles, poetical translations, critical papers on the classics, and sketches of society to various journals, and in 1849 edited Selections from Catullus, for school use. In 1850, he published "Letters to the Hon. Horace Mann", being a reply to some strictures upon the characters of Girard and Astor. In 1852, a collection of his sketches on New York Society entitled "The Upper Ten Thousand", appeared in the Fraser Magazine. At the same time, he published Five Years in an English University, in which he described the manners, customs, and mode of life but little understood in the United States.

Bristed exhibited in his writings a keen appreciation of men and books. His wide scholarship makes his essays valuable and marks his criticisms with the best qualities of a trained university man. He also published many clever poetical translations from the classics. In his later years, Bristed resided in Washington, D.C. He was a frequent contributor to the Galaxy under the pen-name "Carl Benson", and published The Interference Theory of Governments, a book denunciatory of tariff and prohibitory liquor laws, and Pieces of a Broken-down Critic. Bristed was also one of the trustees of the Astor Library from its founding.

He made the earliest known use of the term "conspiracy theory", in a letter to the editor published in The New York Times on January 11, 1863. Bristed used it to refer to claims that British aristocrats were intentionally weakening the United States during the American Civil War in order to advance their financial interests.

== Personal life ==
Upon his return to New York in 1847, Bristed married his first wife, Laura Whetten Brevoort (1823–1861), sister of James Carson Brevoort. He and Laura had one son:

- John Jacob Astor Bristed (1847–1880), who died in his 32nd year.

After his first wife's death from heart disease, he married Grace Ashburner Sedgwick (1833–1897), the daughter of Charles Sedgwick and Elizabeth Buckminster Dwight, by whom he had a son and a daughter:

- Charles Astor Bristed Jr. (1869–1936)
  - Mary Rosa Donnelly (1866–1931) - Married in 1894
  - Clementina Hill (1880–1958) - Married in 1932.
- Cecilia Bristed, an adopted daughter who inherited most of the estate of her brother, John.

Bristed died in Washington, D.C., on January 14, 1874. His funeral was held in Stockbridge, Massachusetts.
