= 1821 in Australia =

- Decades: 1800s; 1810s; 1820s; 1830s; 1840s
- See also: Other events of 1821; Timeline of Australian history

The following lists events that happened during 1821 in Australia.

== Incumbents ==
- Monarch - George IV

=== Governors ===
Governors of the Australian colonies:

- Governor of New South Wales- Major-General Lachlan Macquarie until 1 December 1821, succeeded by Thomas Brisbane.
- Lieutenant-Governor of Tasmania - Colonel William Sorell

== Events ==
- 3 February – Sir Thomas Brisbane is commissioned as Governor to succeed Macquarie. He replaces Macquarie on 1 December of the same year.
- February – John Bigge finishes gathering evidence on all aspects of the colonial government, including finances, the church, the judiciary, and the convict system. He then sails back to England.
- 1 May – The Australian Magazine, Australia's first periodical, begins publication.
- 27 June – The Philosophical Society of Australasia is established. It would be renamed as the Royal Society of New South Wales in 1866 at the request of Queen Victoria.
- 29 October – Governor Macquarie lays foundation stone for first Catholic church in Australia, St Mary's.
- The Female Factory, for women convicts, is separated from the Parramatta Gaol. Many women are selected as brides or for domestic service.
- Parramatta Marist High School, Australia's first private school, founded by John Joseph Therry.
- Wool export in Australia - 75,400 pounds.

== Exploration and settlement ==
- March – Port Macquarie, a penal settlement, was established for convicts that had committed secondary crimes in New South Wales.
