= 1829 in Australia =

- Decades: 1800s; 1810s; 1820s; 1830s; 1840s
- See also: Other events of 1829; Timeline of Australian history

The following lists events that happened during 1829 in Australia.

== Incumbents ==
- Monarch – George IV

=== Governors ===
Governors of the Australian colonies:

- Governor of New South Wales – Ralph Darling
- Lieutenant-Governor of Van Diemen's Land – Colonel George Arthur
- Lieutenant-Governor of the Swan River Colony – Captain James Stirling.

== Events ==
- 2 May – After anchoring nearby, Captain Charles Fremantle of HMS Challenger, proclaimed possession of the whole of the west coast of Australia for the Crown.
- 14 May – Aboriginal mission on Bruny Island opened by George Augustus Robinson.
- 8 June – Captain James Stirling founds the Swan River Colony in Western Australia, landing at Garden Island.
- 18 June – Official proclamation of the Swan River Colony.
- 12 August – Mrs Helen Dance, wife of the captain of HMS Sulphur, cuts down a tree to mark the foundation of the town of Perth, Western Australia.

== Births ==
- 11 June – Sir Edward Braddon, 18th Premier of Tasmania (born in the United Kingdom) (d. 1904)
