= Upper ten thousand =

19th-century phrase for the wealthiest 10,000 residents of New York City

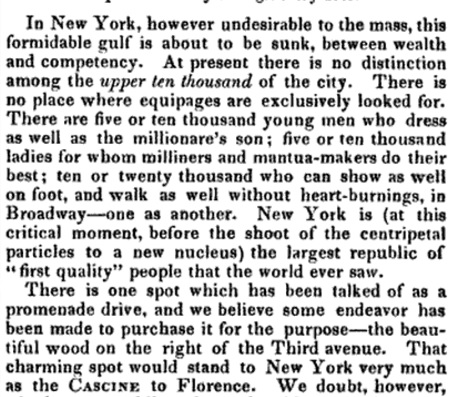
A reprint of the paragraph in which Nathaniel Parker Willis coined the term, 1845

Upper ten thousand, or simply, The Upper Ten, is a 19th-century phrase referring to the wealthiest 10,000 residents of New York City. The phrase was coined in 1844 by American poet and author Nathaniel Parker Willis. Soon, the term came to be used to describe the upper circles not only of New York, but also those of other major cities.

== Usages ==
In 1852, Charles Astor Bristed published a collection of sketches on New York society entitled "The Upper Ten Thousand" in Fraser Magazine. In 1854, George Lippard serialized his book New York: Its Upper Ten and Lower Million. The phrase entered British fiction in The Adventures of Philip (1861–62) by William Thackeray, whose eponymous hero contributed weekly to a fashionable New York journal entitled The Gazette of the Upper Ten Thousand. The general acceptance of the term seems to be attested by its use in the title of Edward Abbott's 1864 cookery book, The English and Australian Cookery Book: Cookery for the Many as Well as the "Upper Ten Thousand".

Extending the term beyond the inhabitants of a city to those of a country as a whole, two 1875 books entitled The Upper Ten Thousand set out to define the upper echelons of British society. Both Adam Bissett Thom (son of Adam Thom) and Kelly's Directory listed members of the aristocracy, the gentry, officers in the Army and Navy, members of Parliament, colonial administrators, and clergy of the established church. The usage of this term was a response to the broadening of the British ruling class which had been caused by the Industrial Revolution.

Most of the people listed in Kelly's Handbook to the Upper Ten Thousand were among the 30,000 descendants of Edward III, King of England, tabulated in the Marquis of Ruvigny and Raineval's Plantagenet Roll of the Blood Royal. Most also appeared in Walford's County Families and Burke's Landed Gentry.

Adolf Hitler referred to Franklin D. Roosevelt as being in the Upper Ten Thousand in his 1941 speech declaring war against the United States, while juxtaposing himself as "[sharing his] fate with millions of others."

== See also ==
- The Four Hundred (Gilded Age)
- Upper class
- We are the 99%
