= 1828 New South Wales census =

- November 1828; 198 years ago

General information
- Country: Colony of New South Wales, British Empire
- Topics: Census topics: Name; Age; Free or bond; Religion; Employment; Residence; District; Number of acres; Livestock
- Authority: King George IV approval
- Website: amw.org.au

Results
- Total population: 36,598
- Most populous district: Sydney
- Least populous district: Pitt Water

The 1828 New South Wales census was the first population census held in the Crown Colony of New South Wales, forty years after it was established. The month used for the census, was taken in November 1828. The total population of the colony was counted as 36,598 and recorded all inhabitants, both convict and free. Only the European population were enumerated. Censuses were taken periodically in the colony thereafter.

== History ==
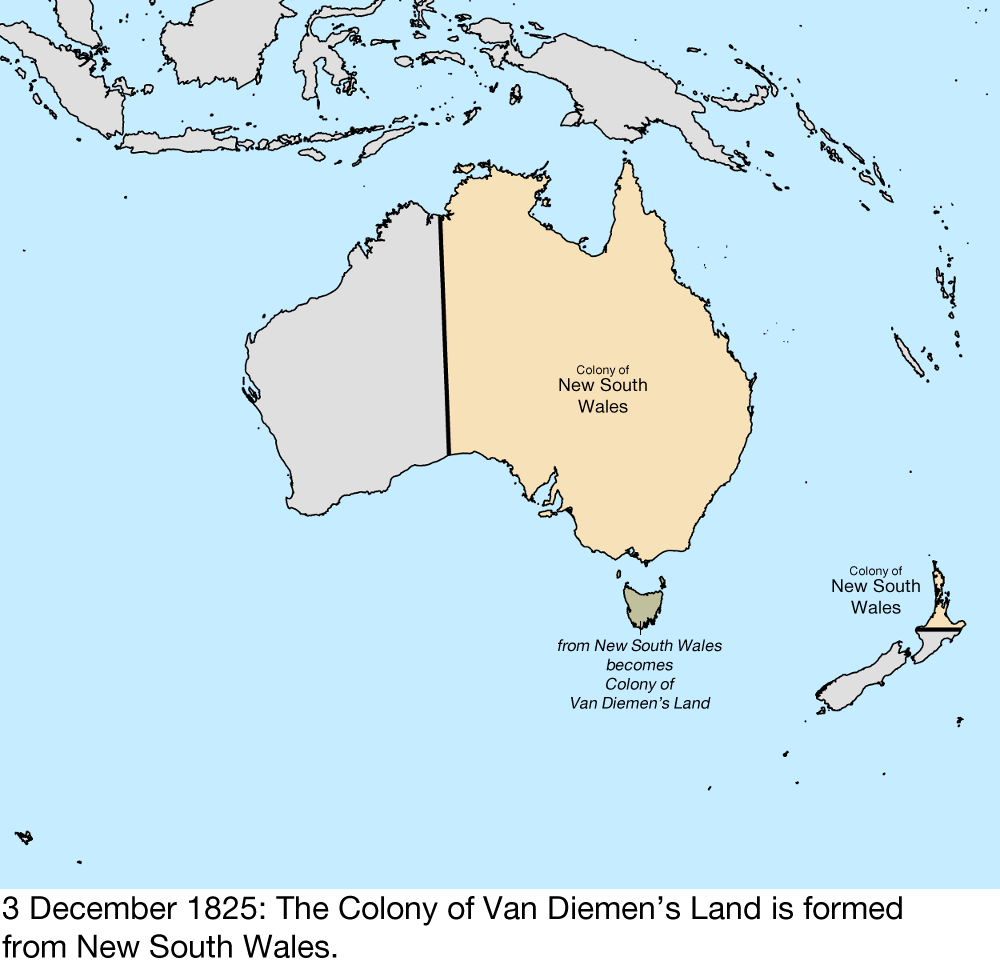
Colony of New South Wales at the time of the census.

Before 1828, the population count was originally gathered through surveys and musters, however they were largely undercounted. The first survey of the NSW settlement was made in 1795. The general musters were held annually from 1795 to 1825 with separate ones being taken, for example - musters of settlers, livestock, convicts, or ones that included only males, females or children. An act (9 Geo IV No. 4) was passed to allow the census. The incumbent Governor Sir Ralph Darling on 29 July 1828 transferred to the Rt. Hon. William Huskisson for King George IV's approval.

== Census questions ==
Information recorded in the census included:

- Name of inhabitant
- Age
- Free or bond
- Ship name on which arrived
- Year arrived
- Sentence
- Religion
- Employment
- Residence
- District
- Total number of acres
- Number of acres cleared
- Number of acres cultivated
- Number of horses
- Number of horned cattle
- Number of sheep

== Results ==
The total population was counted as 36,598, 20,870 were free and 15,728 were convicts. There were 25,248 Protestants and 11,236 Catholics. The Indigenous population were not counted.

A quote from the Sydney Gazette in December 1828 describes life as:

"At the end of 1828, Sydney had 1,409 houses, 176 cottages, 121 skillings and 67 wooden tenements, making a total of 1,773 dwellings. Its urban population was 10,815, and the town occupied a large space of ground; if it had been as well fitted with houses as a town of similar size in England, the population would have been eight or ten times as numerous".

— Sydney Gazette 1828

=== Religion ===
The following table is compiled from the actual religion given on the returns and from the Public Record Office.

Religion	Population	%
Baptist	1	-
Calvinist	1	-
Catholic	8,515	23.4
Church of England	35	-
Deist	2	-
Dissenter	2	-
Episcopalian	17	-
Free Thinker	1	-
Hebrew	8	-
Hindu	1	-
Jew	86	0.23
Lutheran	3	-
Malay	3	-
Mohammedan	10	-
Pagan	2	-
Presbyterian	249	0.68%
Protestant	21,148	58.21
Quaker	6	-
Seeker	1	-
Wesleyan	7	-
Not recorded	6,287	17.27
New South Wales	36,385	100

== Land and livestock ==
Showing the numbers of land and livestock.

County / District	Num. of acres located	Acres cleared	Acres cultivated	Horses	Horned cattle	Sheep
Argyle & St Vincent	295,921	33,311	2,836	2,087	66,697	116,021
Bathurst & Wellington Valley	250,796	39,037	3,497	1,216	45,447	172,953
Camden incl. Illawarra	97,113	7,723	3,278	452	8,962	17,805
Cumberland
Airds & Appin	96,719	18,168	9,172	899	13,694	19,832
Bringelly & Cooke	89,978	11,674	4,052	596	10,182	19,242
Liverpool Town & District	66,569	9,340	2,222	635	3,906	6,198
Parramatta Town & District	82,676	17,969	6,626	1,191	15,035	13,189
Penrith	78,051	16,997	5,690	795	7,660	12,388
Sydney Town & District	272,513	21,639	5,065	1,643	28,598	24,086
Windsor Town & District	105,577	32,049	18,156	1,650	21,048	30,354
Northumberland & Durham
Hunters River & Port Stephens	1,465,953	21,666	10,844	1,311	41,319	104,123
Manning River	4,480	2,000	85	4	320	200
Totals	2,906,346	231,573	71,523	12,479	262,868	536,391

== Copies ==
Only two copies of the census results were produced, all compiled within two years of the census. One comprising six-volumes was kept in New South Wales (NRS 1272), with a seven-volume draft copy sent to the Public Record Office (PRO) in London. Copies are available on microfilm from the State Archives and Records NSW and from The National Archives (TNA) at Kew. The copy in Sydney was handed over in 1901 to the Registrar General; kept in a locked case and highly guarded for over 60 years. In 2019 the Records of the 1828 Census held by NSW State Archives and Records were inscribed on the UNESCO Australian Memory of the World Register.

== See also ==
- Census of Australia

== Archival Holdings ==
- NRS 1272, 1828 Census: Alphabetical returns, held by NSW State Archives and Records
