= 1832 in Australia =

- Decades: 1810s; 1820s; 1830s; 1840s; 1850s
- See also: Other events of 1832; Timeline of Australian history

The following lists events that happened during 1832 in Australia.

== Events ==
- 7 February - The West Australian Legislative Council and Executive Council meet for the first time
- 13 February - The King's School opens in Parramatta
- 18 August - The Savings Bank of New South Wales is established

== Births ==
- 5 January – Edward William Cole, bookseller (born in the United Kingdom) (d. 1918)
- 7 January – James Munro, 15th Premier of Victoria (born in the United Kingdom) (d. 1908)
- 7 February – Samuel Wilson, Victorian politician and pastoralist (born in Ireland) (d. 1895)
- 14 March – Sir James Fergusson, 8th Governor of South Australia (born in the United Kingdom) (d. 1907)
- 21 August – Sir Simon Fraser, Victorian politician, pastoralist and businessman (born in Canada) (d. 1919)
- 9 November – Lorimer Fison, anthropologist, minister and journalist (born in the United Kingdom) (d. 1907)
- 14 November – Henry Strangways, 12th Premier of South Australia (born in the United Kingdom) (d. 1920)
- 15 November – Julian Tenison Woods, priest and geologist (born in the United Kingdom) (d. 1889)
- 30 November – Sir James Dickson, 13th Premier of Queensland (born in the United Kingdom) (d. 1901)
- 13 December – Richard Daintree, geologist and photographer (born in the United Kingdom) (d. 1878)
- Unknown – John Macrossan, Queensland politician (born in Ireland) (d. 1891)

== Deaths ==
- 1 September – Henry Hellyer, explorer (born in the United Kingdom) (b. 1790)
- 7 December – Edward Wollstonecraft, businessman (born in the United Kingdom) (b. 1783)
- Unknown – Sir Henry Browne Hayes, convict (born and died in Ireland) (b. 1762)
