= 1806 in Australia =

- Decades: 1780s; 1790s; 1800s; 1810s; 1820s
- See also: Other events of 1806; Timeline of Australian history

The following lists events that happened during 1806 in Australia.

== Incumbents ==
- Monarch – George III

=== Governors ===
Governors of the Australian colonies:

- Governor of New South Wales – Captain Philip King (until 12 August), then Captain William Bligh
- Lieutenant-Governor of Southern Van Diemen's Land – David Collins
- Lieutenant-Governor of Northern Van Diemen's Land – William Paterson

== Events ==
- 5 August – Captain William Bligh arrives in Sydney to take over the governorship.
- 12 August – Governor King boards HMS Buffalo for his return to England, and Bligh's commission is formally read.

== Exploration and settlement ==
- Governor King estimates that 280 men were employed along the Australian coast in sealing and fishing.
- Matthew Flinders completes the first circumnavigation of the continent.
