= 1810 in Australia =

- Decades: 1790s; 1800s; 1810s; 1820s; 1830s
- See also: Other events of 1810; Timeline of Australian history

The following lists events that happened during 1810 in Australia.

== Incumbents ==
- Monarch – George III

=== Governors ===
Governors of the Australian colonies:

- Governor of New South Wales – Lachlan Macquarie
- Lieutenant-Governor of Tasmania – David Collins

== Events ==
- 1 January – Lachlan Macquarie sworn in as governor of New South Wales.
- 8 January – The Derwent Star and Van Diemen's Land Intelligencer, Australia's second newspaper and the first in Van Diemen's Land, begins publication.

== Exploration and settlement ==
- 6 October – A town plan of Sydney is published, on which the streets are given new and permanent names, including Market, George, Park and Barrack Streets.

== Births ==
- 10 January – William Haines, 1st Premier of Victoria (born in the United Kingdom) (d. 1866)
- 14 August – Angus McMillan, explorer, pastoralist, and Victorian politician (born in the United Kingdom) (d. 1865)

== Deaths ==
- 24 March – David Collins, Lieutenant-Governor of Tasmania (born in the United Kingdom) (b. 1756)
- Tedbury, Sydney indigenous leader
