= The English and Australian Cookery Book =

Australian cookbook published in 1864

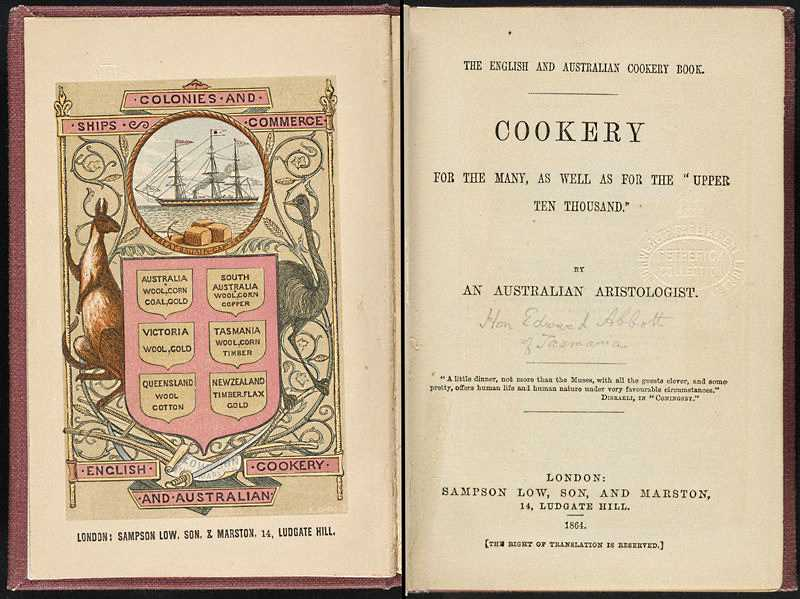
The English and Australian Cookery Book (1864)

The English and Australian Cookery Book is considered to be the first Australian cookbook. Published in London in 1864, the full title of the first edition reads: The English and Australian Cookery Book: Cookery for the Many, as well as the Upper Ten Thousand - by an Australian Aristologist. The author, who listed himself only by the initials "E.A." in the introduction, was a Tasmanian named Edward Abbott.

== Edward Abbott ==
Abbott was the son of a Canadian-born military officer, posted from New South Wales to Hobart in 1815 to become deputy judge advocate. Abbott junior rose from the position of clerk in his father's office to become a key player in the colony as wealthy grazier, coroner and parliamentarian.

He lost much of his wealth, and years of his prime, to an epic legal battle with colonial authorities over a rescinded land grant. Eccentric, he is said to have been the first person to try to raise thylacine cubs (now extinct), his writing suggests he was something of an early Australian nationalist. While proselytising the science, art and etiquette of fine dining — or "aristology" as he called it — he had a quick temper and at one time assaulted the premier of the day with his umbrella, apparently in a rage related to his ongoing legal wrangle with the government.

Shortly before his death in 1869, Abbott sent his will to son Frederick, one of his four children, along with an apology of sorts. "I leave but little, I tried to speculate in wheat, flour and oats — but failed owing to the rascality of commission agents," he explained. However Abbott did manage to leave the legacy of his cookbook.

== Content ==
Within its green and gold cover, illustrated with a stylised globe depicting the opposite nature of the seasons between hemispheres, are nearly 300 pages of recipes. The book is also peppered throughout with hundreds of famous quotations, book excerpts, Bible passages, and poems (including a four-page index for such at the end). While many reference Abbott's cookery book as the first Australian cookbook, few had analysed its contents in detail until 2014 when it was more broadly reproduced in celebration of its 150th anniversary. One recipe that gained attention was the original version of Blow My Skull punch, as credited to Lt. Governor Thomas Davey of Tasmania, as well as advice on how to best roast a wombat or emu.

=== Dedication ===
The book has a lengthy and poem dense two page dedication. The primary dedication goes to William Charles Wentworth, who he ascribes as "the first Australian who has done the State service". He lists passages from Wentworth's 1823 poem Australasia, and also states what appears to be a quote from the poem: "Patriots have toil'd, and in their country's cause Bled nobly". He also dedicates the book to the "fair countrywomen of the 'beautiful land'", the "beautiful land" a clear reference to a passage from the poem.

=== Introductory preface ===
Abbott offers an eight-page introduction. Near its beginning he states: "The following pages will show the British and Colonial mode of rendering the various articles that God has been pleased to give us for our use, nutritious and wholesome, as well as palatable to our tastes. It is a truism, well known, that meat properly cooked is more easily digested. Liebig informs us, 'That among all the arts known to man, there is none which enjoys a juster appreciation, and the products of which are more universally admired, than that which is concerned in the preparation of food'." He later ends the introduction thusly: "I trust, therefore, it may not be inopportune, even in such a work as this, that I may be allowed to apostrophise my country, in the elegant language of Scott-

'Breathes there a man with soul so dead.
Who never to himself has said,
This is my own—my native land!'"

=== Selected chapter information ===
The book has 115 chapters, labeled by Roman numerals. Some are quite short (a page) and may be best thought of as categories, while others are much more lengthy. They are not listed in alphabetical order. As a sampling, the first dozen comprise I.Soups, II.Broths, III.Roasting, IV.Boiling, V.Baking, VI.Frying, VII.Broiling, VIII.Made dishes, IX.Sauces, X.Gravies, XI.The cook, and XII.Condiments.

==== Alcoholic drink chapters ====
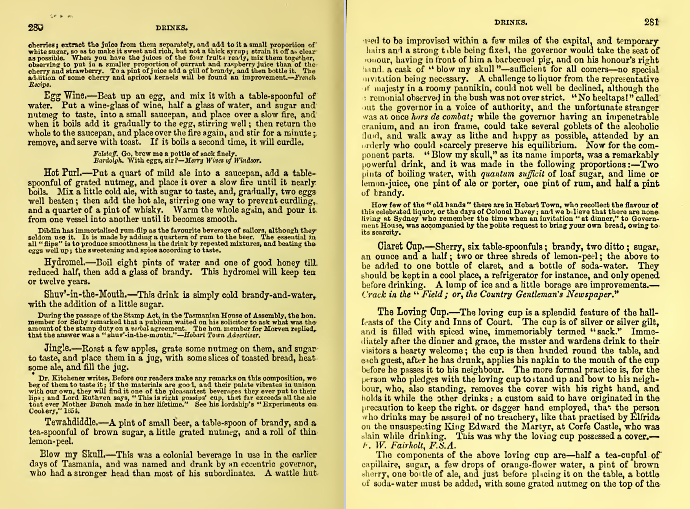
Blow My Skull punch recipe

The book contains chapters on liqueurs, beer, wines, drink, bitters, cider and perry, and "magical drinks". The liqueurs category begins by stating that parfait amour had gone out of style, and had been replaced by maraschino, "even in preference to curacao." He also states that English cherry brandy was a good "jumping powder" before a hunt to help steady one's aim. He goes on to warn that "kirschwasser is downright poison", while then listing a recipe for Martinique Noyeau (some brands of Noyeau liqueur have in fact also been found to be poisonous).

Recipes include one for absinthe, as well as an alcoholic concoction he refers to as Tears of the Widow of Malabar, the ingredients for such calling for 10 pounds of pale brandy, 4 pounds of white sugar, 4 pints of water, 4 drachms powdered cinnamon, and 48 grains each of clove and mace. The name is likely a reference to a play from the same era named The Widow of Malabar, by Mariana Starke.

A Rum Shrub recipe called for almonds, cloves, cassia, and the peel of oranges, "infused in the best rum," with the addition of a thread of ambergris and vanilla. "Good shrub is very delicious, and were it fashionable it would obtain rank as a liqueur."

==== Coffee and tea chapters ====
The book also contains chapters on coffee and tea. Abbott begins his discussion on coffee with a passage from Alexander Pope:

Coffee — which makes the politician wise,
And see through all things with his half-shut eyes
Sent up in vapours to the baron’s brain
New stratagems, the radiant Lock to gain.

In his analysis of coffee he states "The roasting of the berry to a proper degree requires great nicety; the virtues and agreeableness of the drink depend upon it, and both are often injured by the general method."

In discussing the proper preparation of both coffee and tea Abbott offers varied opinions on the worthiness of the drinks. Regarding coffee: "M.Payen proves that coffee, slightly roasted, contains the maximum of aroma, weight, and nutrition. He declares coffee to be nutritious, as it contains a large quantity of azote, three times as much nutriment as tea, and more than twice the nourishment of soup." Regarding tea: 'Newnham, on the “Medicinal and Dietetic Property of Tea,' maintains, that in a state of sthenic excitement of the brain and nervous system - as that produced by alcoholic stimulants, or by intense and long-continued application of the mind to any particular object of literary research - tea will act as a remedy; whereas, on the contrary, in cases' of diminished excitement, morbid vigilance and nervous disturbance will follow its potation. Swift tells us, to such an extent is modern epicurism carried, that the world must be encompassed before a washerwoman can sit down to breakfast; while Cobbett exclaims, 'The drink which has come to supply the place of beer has, in general, been tea. It is notorious that tea has no useful strength in it; it contains nothing nutritious; it is known to produce want of sleep, and to weaken the nerves.' According to a late letter from the Times’ correspondent in India, we are soon to be supplied with tea largely from that part of the empire."

==== The cook chapter ====
In discussing the roles of cooks in a chapter, Abbott states that "The status of the cooks of our day is far below their vocation." Abbott goes on to cite the poor wages cooks receive, and even offers aid. "A Cooks’ Refuge. Why not organise an asylum for decayed cooks of good character? We are quite willing to contribute a large number of copies of this work for their benefit; but the only drawback to that offer might be that they would realise nothing."

==== Dessert chapters ====
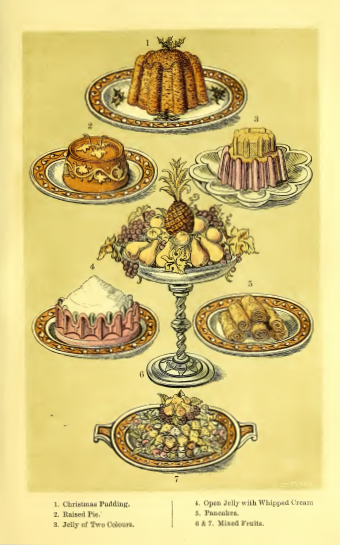
Page 51 of the book

Abbott includes categories for desserts, puddings and pies, pastry, cakes, confectionary and chocolate. A recipe for "Gooseberry Fool" and "Gooseberry Trifle" directs a reader to "Blanch a quart of gooseberries, closely covered with sufficient water to pulp them; beat six eggs, and add them to a pint of cream - some use milk - a table-spoonful of orange-flower water, spice and sugar to sweeten; stir it over a fire till of a proper thickness; dish, and sift powdered white sugar on the top. [for Gooseberry Trifle] Proceed as above with a quart of gooseberries, and pass them through a sieve; then place them at the bottom of a dish; add sugar and a little nutmeg. Mix half a pint of cream with the same quantity of milk, and the yolk of an egg; scald it over the fire, and stir it; add a little sugar, and let it cool. Pour over the gooseberries a whip made the day before of a pint of cream, two eggs, lemon-peel to flavour a little, and sugar."

==== Eggs and omelettes chapter ====
Abbott includes information from the Sydney newspaper regarding the use of native eggs. "The ibis, or bran’s eggs, have been procured in great numbers. These eggs are of a white colour, rather sharp at one end, and about the size of a turkey’s egg. The albumen is, however, quite different from that of any other egg, being, even when boiled, pellucid, gelatinous, and fat in appearance, and very small in quantity compared with the yolk. On the whole this egg may be pronounced not particularly palatable, and will never be used except as a makeshift, when neither hen nor duck eggs can be procured." A recipe for "Eggs an Miroir" instructs a reader to "spread a piece of butter upon a dish that can be set on the fire, break the eggs over it, adding salt, pepper, and two spoonfuls of milk; place it on a slow fire, with a red-hot shovel over it, and serve when the eggs are set."

==== Fish chapters ====
Fish received its own chapter, and was further broken down by region to also include chapters on British fish, South Australian, Tasmanian, New Zealand, Victorian, and New South Wales. Regarding the fish of New Zealand: "One hundred different species of fish have been described by naturalists as frequenting the coasts; and this list is apparently very imperfect, seeing that the natives have enumerated to me many more they are in the habit of eating. Next to the shark, which renders bathing dangerous in the summer, the hapuka is the largest New Zealand salt-water fish. One hundred pounds is no unusual weight for an hapuka."

A recipe for salmon pie in the Hebrew section instructs to: "Cut two pounds of fine fresh salmon in slices, about three-quarters of an inch thick, and set them aside on a dish; clean and scrape five or six anchovies, and halve them; then chop a small pottle of mushrooms, a handful of fresh parsley, a couple of shalots, and a little green thyme. Put these together into a saucepan, with three ounces of butter, a little pepper, salt and nutmeg, and tarragon; add the juice of a lemon, and half a pint of good brown gravy; and let the whole simmer, stirring it gently all the time: also slice six eggs boiled hard; then line a pie-dish with short paste, and fill it with alternate layers of the slices of salmon, hard eggs, and fillets of anchovies, spreading between each layer the herb sauce; then cover the dish with the paste, and bake in a moderately-heated oven.

==== Game chapter ====
An example recipe for peacock: "Instead of plucking this bird, take off the skin with the greatest care, so that the feathers do not get detached or broken. Stuff it with what you like, as truffles, mushrooms, livers of fowls, bacon, salt, spice, thyme, crumbs of bread, and a bay-leaf. Wrap the claws and head in several folds of cloth, and envelope the body in buttered paper. The head and claws, which project at the two ends, must be basted with water during the cooking, to preserve them, and especially the tuft. Before taking it off the spit, brown the bird by removing the paper. Garnish with lemon and flowers. If to come on the table cold, place the bird in a wooden trencher, in the middle of which is fixed a wooden skewer, which should penetrate the body of the bird, to keep it upright. Arrange the claws and feathers in a natural manner, and the tail like a fan, supported with wire. No ordinary cook can place a peacock on the table properly. This ceremony was reserved, in the times of chivalry, for the lady most distinguished for her beauty. She carried it, amidst inspiring music, and placed it, at the commencement of the banquet, before the master of the house. At a nuptial feast, the peacock was served by the maid of honour, and placed before the bride."

==== The Hundred guinea dish chapter ====
In honoring Prince Albert, Abbott highlights a dinner devised for an exhibition banquet given by the Lord Mayor of York to Prince in 1850. "In a work on Cookery such a dish should find a place as a curiosity." The dinner included "5 Turtle heads, part of fins, and green fat, 24 Capons (the two small noix from middle of back only used), 18 Turkeys—the same, 18 Poulards—the same, 16 Fowls—the same, 10 Grouse, 20 Pheasants—noix only, 45 Partridges—the same, 6 Plovers, 40 Woodcocks—noix only, 3 Dozen quails, whole, 100 Snipes—noix only, 3 Dozen pigeons—noix only, 6 Dozen larks, stuffed, and Ortolans, from Belgium."

Including garnish, the entire dinner would cost £105, a full £34 of which were just for the 5 turtle heads.

==== Meat chapters ====
The book includes several categories related to sausages, forcemeat and the like. From the chapter "Hams, Bacon, and Salt Meat" is a recipe for Kangaroo Ham (Prize Recipe): "Take a quarter of a pound of fine Liverpool salt, add three ounces of coarse brown sugar, and one ounce of pounded allspice; mix them well together, then rub the whole well on and down the leg bone; let them lay in the pickle for a fortnight, rubbing them every other day. If not required for immediate use they may be hung up to dry; in this state they will keep good for years. When required for the table, chop off the bone close to the meaty part, cut slightly the sinew over the knee-joint, and bind it round; steep in cold water for twelve hours or more before using, then place it in a saucepan of cold water on a slow fire, and let it boil only ten minutes, drawing it aside until the water is nearly cool. When dished, pour over a rich brown gravy, flavoured with mace, salt, and pepper. Garnish with forcemeat balls, adding to the usual ingredients a little smoked bacon very finely chopped; a slice of boiled pork or ham is an agreeable addition. The above recipe obtained a prize medal at the London Exhibition of 1862, and was kindly furnished the author by Mrs. Crouch, who was awarded the distinction."

==== Sauces chapter ====
Many sauces are listed. Examples include: "Poor Man’s Sauce - Pick a handful of parsley leaves from the stalks, mince them very fine, strew over them a little salt; shred fine half a dozen young green onions, add them to the parsley, and put them into a sauceboat, with three table-spoonfuls of oil and five of vinegar; add some black ground pepper and salt; stir together, and serve. Pickles of any kind may be added, cut small, or grated horseradish. Dr. Kitchener says, that the rich sometimes order the peasants’ fare, as a variety. According to Dryden—

'The rich, tired with continual feasts,
For change, become the next poor tenant’s guests;
Drink hearty draughts of ale from plain brown bowls.
And snatch the homely rasher from the coals.'"

Steak Sauce: "Pound an ounce of black pepper, half an ounce of allspice, an ounce of salt, and an ounce of grated horseradish and shalots. Put these articles to a pint of mushroom ketchup, and let them infuse for a month." Regarding mushroom ketchup, Abbott elsewhere in the book writes: "Syn.: Catchup, catsup, katchup, ketchup. Sprinkle mushrooms, fresh gathered, with common salt for three days, then squeeze out the juice, and to each gallon add cloves and mustard-seed of each half an ounce; allspice, black pepper, and ginger bruised, one ounce; boil sufficiently. The above is from Cooley’s 'Practical Receipts,' and if followed with attention, cannot be improved; some persons use a little brandy, but any such spirit destroys the delicate flavour of the mushroom. Oyster, pontac, tomato, walnut, anchovy, caper, and cockle are each additions to the real ketchup, and take their names. There is nothing so useful in cookery as good ketchup; and we strongly advise the housewife to make it herself, as those purchased ready-made can seldom be depended on. It is a most valuable addition to soups, joints, and indeed every dish. Bottles of the best kind are required to hold it. Nothing in the shape of copper, lead, or pewter must be allowed to touch it; a plated copper spoon left in a bottle of ketchup for any time will render its contents poisonous. Dangerous fits of vomiting, colic, and diarrhoea have resulted from the neglect of this latter precaution."

==== Scraps and sayings chapter ====
Abbott's chapter on scraps and sayings gave advice on how to make food last longer, as did additional chapters regarding preserved meats, vinegar, pickles, and pyroligneous acid. "If you would avoid waste in your family, attend to the followingrules, and do not despise them because they appear so unimportant." Some selected offered bits of wisdom:

- Many a little makes a mickle
- Eggs will keep any reasonable length of time in lime-water properly prepared
- Suet and lard keep better in tin than in earthen; Suet will keep all the year round, if chopped and packed in a stone jar, covered with molasses
- If beer grows sour, it may be used to advantage in pancakes and fritters
- A bit in the morning is better than nothing all day
- Good kale is half a meal
- Butter is gold in the morning, silver at noon, lead at night
- He that would live for aye must cart sage in May

==== Soup chapter ====
In describing turtle soup he recommends: "Hang up the turtle the night before it is to be dressed, cut off its head, or a weight may be placed on its back, to make it extend itself. When dead, cut the belly part clear off, sever the fins at the point, take away the white meat, and put it into water. Draw, cleanse, and wash the entrails; scald the fins, the head, and the belly shells; saw the shell about two inches deep all round, scald and cut it into pieces; put the head, shell, and fins in a pan, cover them with stock, add shalots, thyme, marjoram, and spice—chop the herbs. Stew it till tender, then take out the meat, and strain the liquor through a sieve. Cut the fins in three pieces, and take out all the brown—as the meat is called—from the bones, and cut it in square pieces. Melt some butter in a stewpan, and put the white meat to it; simmer it till nearly done, then take it out of the liquor, and cut it into slices of a medium size. Cover the bowels, lungs, heart, &c. with stock, and herbs and spices, and stew them till tender. The liver must be boiled by itself, being bitter, and not improving the colour of the other entrails, which should be kept as white as possible. The entrails being done, taken up, and cut in pieces, strain the liquor through a sieve. Melt a pound of butter in a stewpan large enough to hold all the meat; stir in half a pound of flour, put in the liquor, and stir the whole until well mixed. Make a number of forcemeat balls; put to the whole three pints of Madeira wine, a high seasoning of cayenne pepper, salt, and the juice of two lemons. The deep shell must be baked, whether filled or not, as the meat must be browned. The shell being thus filled, the remainder is to be served in tureens. In filling up the shells and tureens, a little fat should be put at the bottom, the lean in the centre, and eggs and forcemeat balls, with part of the entrails, on the top. Be cautious not to study a brown colour, the natural green being preferred by every connoisseur. If you warm turtle soup often, it loses its flavour. The fins of the turtle make a luxurious side dish."

==== Water and ice chapters ====
Abbott describes the importance of water, providing information on cisterns and water purification methods. In regards to ice, he discusses the use of "butter coolers" and "freezing vases". For people who can not afford to buy a freezing vase, he lists methods to create cold temperatures without the use of ice. "A cheap and powerful freezing mixture may be obtained by pulverising glauber salts finely, and placing it at the bottom of a glass vessel. Equal parts of sal-ammoniac and nitre are then to be finely powdered and mixed together, and subsequently added to the glauber salts, stirring the powder well together to dissolve the salts; a degree of cold will be produced frequently below zero of Fahrenheit."

=== Conclusion ===
Abbott ends the book with more quotations, "'Now good digestion wait on appetite, And health on both.' — Macbeth. We now bring our aristological labours to an end..." He references the book's limitations, and also seeks suggestions for its improvement. He adds "In the event of a second edition being called for, the compiler would feel thankful to receive any additional practical recipes from the ladies of Australia and others, pertaining to the subject, so as to make the book, as a reference, as useful as possible."

== Editions ==
In his gastronomic history of Australia, Michael Symons often refers to Abbott's cookery book, devoting a chapter to its contents. He viewed it as a positive first step in the emerging Australian culinary tradition and lamented that the book did not have more than one edition.

In 1970, a selection of material from Abbott's original version was republished under the title The Colonial Cook Book: the Recipes of a By-gone Australia, edited by Alison Burt. Although now out of print, this abridged edition may be found in specialist second-hand booksellers or in larger institutional libraries in Australia.

An exact facsimile was published in Tasmania in 2014 to mark the sesquicentenary (150 years) of Abbott's original publication. This slipcased edition includes a Companion Volume in contrasting gilt foil cover with authoritative essays by Professor Barbara Santich, Food Studies, Adelaide University (Bold Palates); seminal Australian culinary history author Michael Symons (One Continuous Picnic) and the world authority on Edward Abbott, Tony Marshall - as well as interpretive recipes by Sally Wise (A Year in a Bottle) and cocktails by historian Sebastian Reaburn.
