= 1823 in Australia =

- Decades: 1800s; 1810s; 1820s; 1830s; 1840s
- See also: Other events of 1823; Timeline of Australian history

The following lists events that happened during 1823 in Australia.

== Incumbents ==
- Monarch – George IV

=== Governors ===
Governors of the Australian colonies:

- Governor of New South Wales – Major-General Sir Thomas Brisbane
- Lieutenant-Governor of Tasmania – Colonel William Sorell

== Events ==
- The British Government, with the New South Wales Judicature Act, establishes the first Legislative Council in Australia, an advisory body of five appointed citizens. The Governor, Thomas Brisbane, has power of veto.
- 15 February – Surveyor James McBrien at the Fish River near Bathurst discovers gold. It is the first known report of gold, though it is not made public, the Australian gold rushes do not begin until 1851.
- 19 July –
  - The Supreme Court of Civil Judicature of New South Wales is abolished by the Third Charter of Justice; it was replaced by the Supreme Court of New South Wales.
  - The Governors Court is abolished by the Third Charter of Justice; it was replaced by the New South Wales Legislative Council.
  - The Lieutenant Governor's Court is abolished by the Third Charter of Justice; it was replaced by the Supreme Court of Van Diemen's Land.
- 11 December – Richmond Bridge, the oldest bridge in Australia still in use, had its foundation stone laid.
- The Vice Admiralty Court is established.
- The Bank of Van Diemen's Land is established, it is Van Diemen's Land first commercial financial institution.

== Exploration and settlement ==
- 5 June – A path through the Liverpool Range, now known as Pandora's Pass, is found by Allan Cunningham.
- 31 October – John Oxley explores the Tweed River.
- 2 December – John Oxley become the first European to navigate the Brisbane River.

== Arts and literature ==
- William Charles Wentworth publishes the first book of Australian verse, Australasia: A Poem, in London.

== Births ==
- Unknown – Frank McCallum, bushranger (born in the United Kingdom) (d. 1857)

== Deaths ==
- 5 January – George Johnston (b. 1764), marine and Lieutenant-Governor of New South Wales
- 7 November – Thomas Laycock (b. 1786), explorer
