= 1824 in Australia =

- Decades: 1800s; 1810s; 1820s; 1830s; 1840s
- See also: Other events of 1824; Timeline of Australian history

The following lists events that happened during 1824 in Australia.

== Incumbents ==
- Monarch - George IV

=== Governors ===
Governors of the Australian colonies:

- Governor of New South Wales- Major-General Sir Thomas Brisbane
- Lieutenant-Governor of Tasmania – Colonel George Arthur

== Events ==
- 5 March – The first Chief Justice of the Supreme Court Francis Forbes arrives in Sydney.
- 7 May – The Supreme Court of Tasmania, the first of all the State Supreme Courts, is established by Letters Patent.
- 17 May – The Supreme Court of New South Wales is created by Letters Patent.
- 25 August – The Legislative Council of New South Wales sits for the first time.
- 21 October – Joshua John Moore is the first person to take out a ticket-of-occupation for the land which later became the site of Canberra
- Name change from ' New Holland ' to ' Australia ', recommended by Matthew Flinders in 1804, receives official sanction by the United Kingdom.

== Exploration and settlement ==
- 12 September – Lieutenant Henry Miller is formally appointed to establish a penal colony at Moreton Bay resulting in the founding of Brisbane on the Brisbane River (Miller had arrived in Moreton Bay a couple of months prior to the formal appointment)
- 20 September – Gordon Bremer arrives in Port Essington, in the Northern Territory, but rejects the recommended site as a settlement due to its lack of fresh water. Bremer claims the north coast of Australia from 129° to 135° longitude as British territory. On 21 October Bremer's party establishes a settlement at Fort Dundas on Melville Island.
- 28 September – John Oxley recommends a new settlement be founded at Brisbane after finding Moreton Bay unsuitable.
- 16 December – Explorers Hamilton Hume and William Hovell arrive in the area Aboriginal people call Corayo on a bay called Jillong.

== Arts and literature ==
- 14 October – W. C. Wentworth and Robert Wardell begin publication of The Australian, the first independent newspaper in Australia.

== Births ==
- 23 March – John Norton Oxley, New South Wales politician (d. 1891)
- 2 May – William Randell, South Australian politician and pioneer (born in the United Kingdom) (d. 1911)

== Deaths ==
- 19 July – Alexander Pearce, convict and criminal (born in Ireland) (b. 1790)
