= Blow my skull =

Alcoholic punch of rum, porter, and brandy

Blow my skull punch
- Type: Mixed drink
- Ingredients: 1 pint rum; 1 pint porter or ale; 1/2 pint brandy; 2 pints boiling water; lime or lemon juice to taste; sugar to taste
- Standard drinkware: Mug

Blow my skull is an alcoholic punch drink that originated in mid-19th century Australia. As listed in The English and Australian Cookery Book by Edward Abbott, it calls for two pints of boiling water, sugar loaf, lime or lemon juice, one pint of ale or porter, one pint rum, and a half a pint of brandy. It has been described as a "notoriously potent alcoholic concoction".

Some alternatively call the drink blow my skull off, which may also refer to a historical version made instead by the mixing of rum, Cocculus indicus, "spirits of wine", cayenne pepper, Turkish opium and water.

== Origin and name conflation ==
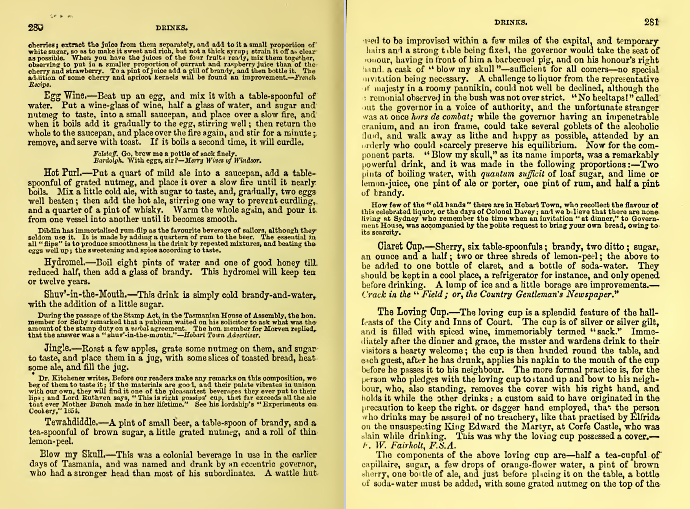
Blow My Skull punch recipe (The English and Australian Cookery Book, 1864)

The drink was invented by Lieutenant Governor Thomas Davey of Tasmania, who was known for being a heavy drinker. The drink's "official" name has varied opinion. Some refer to Davey inventing it with the name "blow my skull", closely referring to the material found in The English and Australian Cookery Book. Others claim it was Davey inventing it as the "blow my skull off". Unless the varying names were frequently conflated, for the latter claim to be true would mean that Lt. Governor Thomas Davey invented a drink containing opium and toxic plants that he served at barbeques he frequently held in a wattle hut erected a few miles outside of the capital.

The version containing opium was a popular drink among gold miners in Australia in the 1850s.

The "blow my skull off" has been characterized as probably being "the most famous cocktail created in Australia". Cocktail historian Sebastian Raeburn has stated that Melbourne was "one of the great cocktail centres of the world."

== 21st century usage ==
With historical roots based in rum punch drinks from the Oceanic region, "Blow my skull" punch is sometimes served as a flaming drink when placed into a large skull shaped tiki bowl. As such it calls for Jamaican pot-still rum, dark porter, brandy, and lime juice mixed with demerara sugar and boiling water. This recipe is nearly identical to the non-opium containing version from mid-19th century Australia that was prepared using porter beer. Other 21st century drink guides may still refer to such a beer cocktail as a "blow my head off" however. When the drink is referenced in 21st century cocktail books both names should be interpreted as meaning the porter-based version unless the guide specifically indicates to the contrary.

== Other versions ==
A different version called the flaming skull punch bowl calls for very different ingredients than the porter-based "blow my skull" punch. Its ingredients include: 2 oz Jamaican Rum, 2 oz White Rum, 1 oz Black Strap Rum, 1 oz Angostura Amaro, 1.5 oz Lime Juice, 1.5 oz Orange Juice, 1.5 oz Orgeat, and 1 oz Passion Fruit Syrup.

The blow my skull off (almost) is a single person version served at Tiki bars and other locations with little in relation to the original drinks but the name. It calls for:

- 2 oz Cognac
- 1/2 oz Peach Schnapps
- 1/2 oz Herbal Liqueur (e.g., Jagermeister)

The almost blow my skull off is also a single serving cocktail, its recipe being from mixologist Gary Regan and calling for:

- 2 oz Cognac
- 1/2 oz Jagermeister
- 1/4 oz Ancho Reyes Verde liqueur

== See also ==
- Hard multum
- List of cocktails
- Queen Mary (cocktail)
- Tiki culture
