= 1819 in Australia =

- Decades: 1790s; 1800s; 1810s; 1820s; 1830s
- See also: Other events of 1819; Timeline of Australian history

The following lists events that happened during 1819 in Australia.

== Incumbents ==
- Monarch – George III

=== Governors ===
Governors of the Australian colonies:

- Governor of New South Wales- Lachlan Macquarie
- Lieutenant-Governor of Van Diemen's Land - Colonel William Sorell

== Events ==
John Thomas Bigge was appointed a special commissioner to examine the government of the Colony of New South Wales by Lord Bathurst. His brief was to determine how far the expanding colony of New South Wales could be "made adequate to the Objects of its original Institution", which were understood to be purely to be a penal colony. He was to come to Australia to investigate all aspects of the colonial government, then under the governorship of Lachlan Macquarie, including finances, the church and the judiciary, and the convict system.

== Births ==
- 8 April - James Tyson, pastoralist.
- 1 August - Explorer Augustus Gregory is born at Farnsfield, Nottingham, England.

== Deaths ==
- 13 May - Margaret Catchpole, Adventuress and chronicler.
