= 1811 in Australia =

- Decades: 1790s; 1800s; 1810s; 1820s; 1830s
- See also: Other events of 1811; Timeline of Australian history

The following lists events that happened during 1811 in Australia.

== Incumbents ==
- Monarch – George III

=== Governors ===
Governors of the Australian colonies:

- Governor of New South Wales – Lachlan Macquarie
- Lieutenant-Governor of Tasmania – unfilled until 1813

== Events ==
- 1 February – John Oxley is appointed Surveyor-General of New South Wales.
- 2 December – Reverend Samuel Marsden sent the first commercial shipment of wool from New South Wales to England.

== Exploration and settlement ==
- 1 December – During a tour of Van Diemen's Land, Governor Macquarie gave directions for the layout of Hobart. There was a central square and seven streets named Macquarie, Liverpool, Argyle, Elizabeth, Murray, Harrington and Collins.

== Births ==
- 21 July – Robert Mackenzie, future Premier of Queensland from August 1867 to November 1868.

== Deaths ==
- 5 April – Thomas Reibey, husband of Mary Reibey, leaving her in control of large colonial business enterprises.
