= Cultural institutions in Australia =

From 1827, Mechanics' Institutes, Literary Institutes, Athenaeums and Schools of Arts played an important role in the life of early Australian communities. Among their roles was the provision of libraries and reading rooms, but as community institutions they also provided lectures and adult education.

== Background ==
The 'School of Arts' movement began in Britain in the beginning of the nineteenth century. The first School of Arts opened in Edinburgh, Scotland in 1821, with others in Glasgow and London in 1823. The first Mechanics' Institute was established in Glasgow in 1821.

== Arrival in Australia ==
The first such institution in Australia was the Van Diemen's Land Mechanics' Institute, Hobart, which opened in 1827. This was soon followed by the Sydney Mechanics' School of Arts in 1833.

== Government support ==
By 1900 there were 1000 Mechanics' Institutes in Australia with memberships of between 100 and 200 people. Most of these Institutes did not have large libraries, usually having less than 1,000 books. Their role in a country town was more a general focus for the community's cultural activities, not just that of a library. As well as membership subscriptions, the Institutes were supported by colonial governments and sometimes by local government, usually by land grants and cash assistance. The institution generally had a purpose built building in the town. Many of these buildings are no longer home to those institutions but are used for other purposes.

== Expansion ==
The first Mechanics' Institute founded in Victoria was in Melbourne in 1839. The Institute at Portland was founded in 1843 and Geelong's Institute in 1846. Institutes were established at Beechworth, Kyneton, Prahran and Sandhurst (later known as Bendigo) in 1854, Castlemaine and Eldorado in 1855, Footscray in 1857, Ballarat and Creswick in 1859, Berwick in 1862, and Maldon in 1863. The increasing numbers of Mechanics' institutes in Victoria seems to have been a consequence of the expansion of settlement, in particular associated with the gold rushes, rather than from meeting any specific cultural, educational or recreational need. The Victorian government between 1860 and 1895 spent around £220,000 on grants. The increase in the number of institutes founded after 1860, especially in the country areas, was a direct result of the grants which were made available. The conditions attached to the grant, for the purchase of books and for public access, was influential in making the library the main activity of the institutes and achieved the aim of allowing many Victorians in the late 19th century to enjoy access to a reasonable library service.

== Reduction of subsidies ==
In 1912, a New South Wales committee was set up to examine whether the £10,000 subsidy paid annually by the government to Schools of Arts and similar institutions was money well spent. The committee determined it was not well spent and recommended phasing out or reducing the subsidy in metropolitan areas and municipalities and that local authorities take over schools of arts. There were not enough books, especially non-fiction, and services were limited under the current arrangements. However, lobbying saw the recommendations not implemented. Subsidies continued until the 1930s depression.

== Institutional survival ==
Very few of these cultural institutions have survived to this day, their roles having been assumed by government organisations such as public libraries and TAFE. They have however left behind many historical buildings in cities and towns throughout Australia, some of which have been converted into community halls. For instance, over 1,200 Mechanics' Institutes were built in Victoria but just over 500 remain today, and only six still operate their lending library services.

== Gallery ==
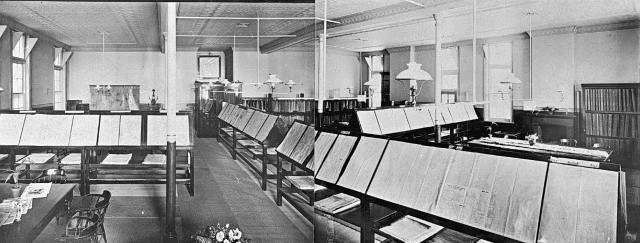
The newspaper reading room of the Ballarat Mechanics' Institute in 1909

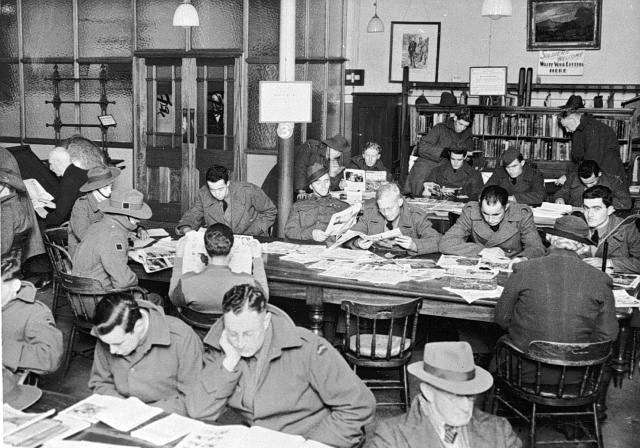
American and Australian soldiers in the reading room of the Ballarat Mechanics' Institute in 1942

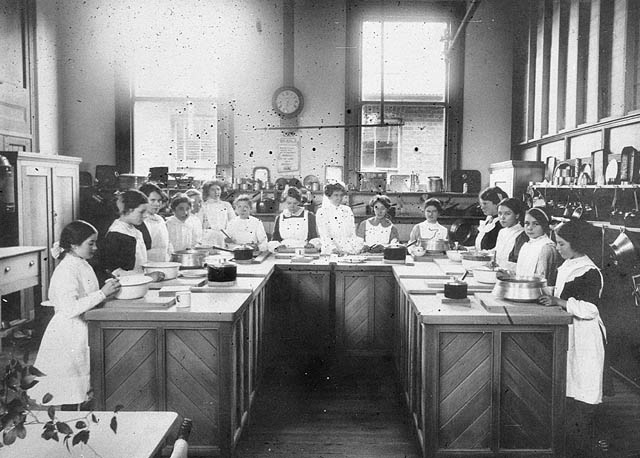
Cookery class about 1910 at the Echuca Mechanics' Institute, Victoria. The motto reads "Our Motto: Instead of being regarded as a servile employment, Cookery here is exalted into a science".

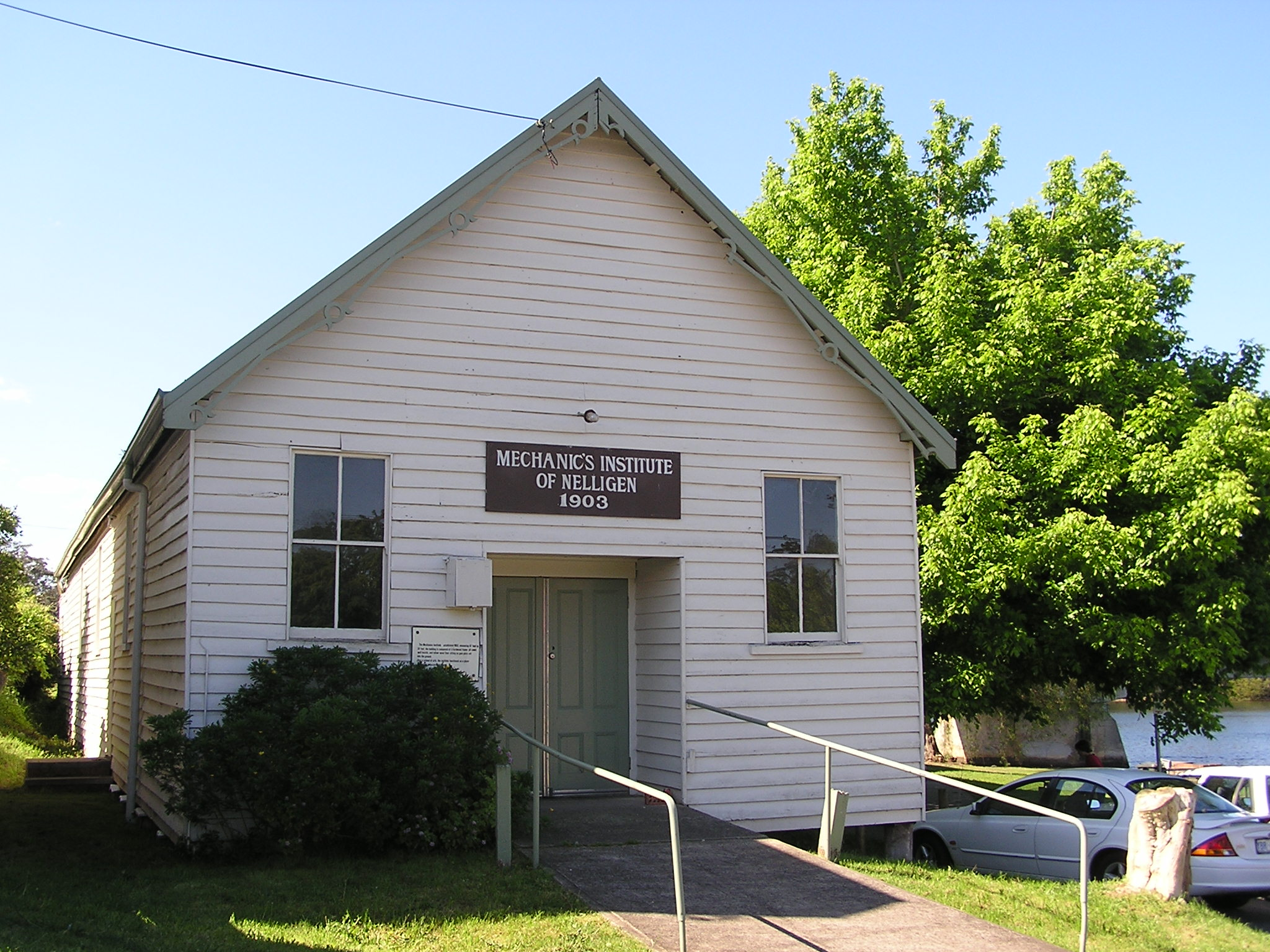
Mechanics' Institute at Nelligen, New South Wales built 1903

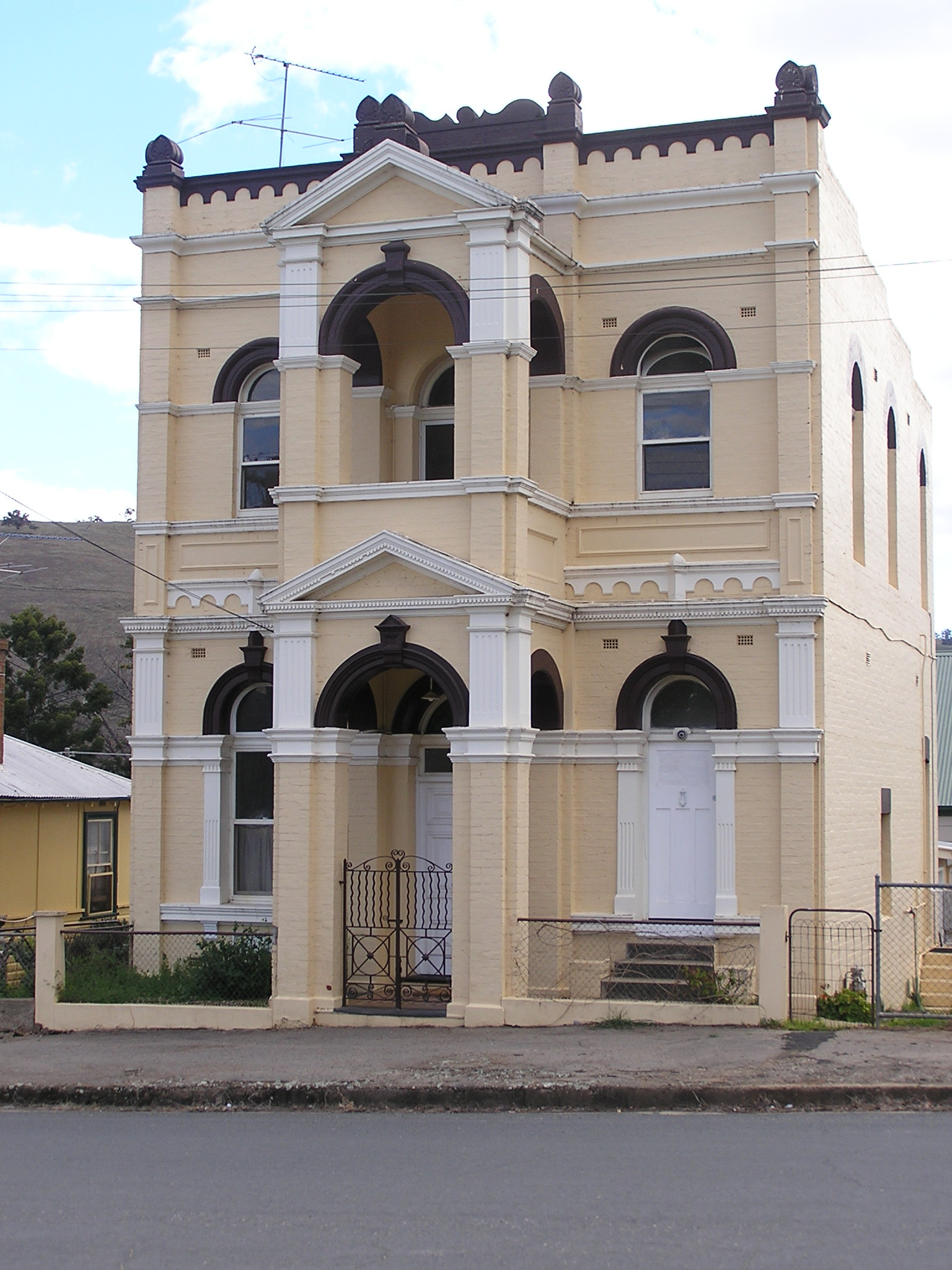
Building of former Literary Institute at Gundagai, New South Wales

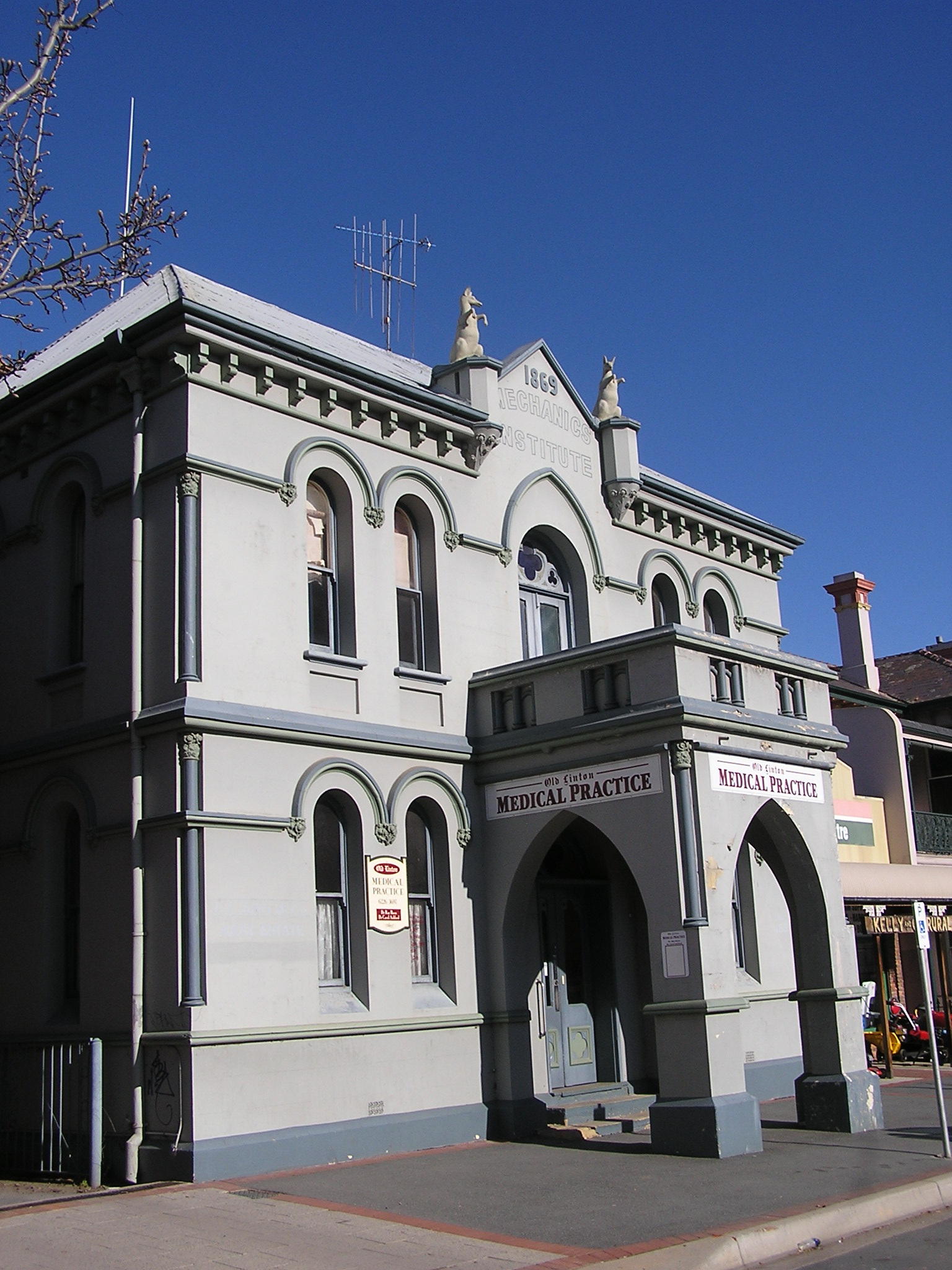
Former Mechanics' Institute at Yass, built 1869

Mechanics' Institute, Sorrento built 1876-7

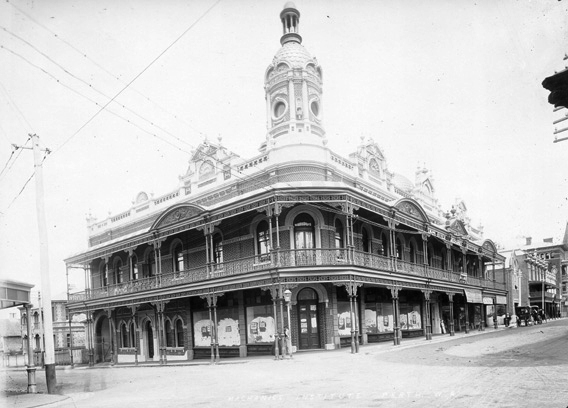
Swan River Mechanics' Institute c.1900

== See also ==
- Mechanics' Institutes
