= Edward Devine =

Edward Devine (10 August 1833 – 18 December 1908) was a New Zealand coach driver, hotel-keeper and barman. He was born in Brighton, Tasmania, Australia on 10 August 1833. He won a high reputation for excellent handling of horses and for his skill in emergencies.

He began driving for Cobb & Co in New Zealand in 1863. When the rail link between Christchurch and Dunedin was finished in 1878 he tried a new route but retired after a few weeks. A stint as a hotel proprietor ended when his licence was not renewed and he became a barman in Dunedin.

By 1894 he had returned to Australia. He died in Ballarat in 1908.
