= George Clarke (convict) =

English convict

George "The Barber" Clarke (1806 – 11 August 1835) was an English convict who was transported to Australia, escaped and became a notable bushranger while living with Aboriginal Australians in the Liverpool Plains district of New South Wales. He is famous for giving an exaggerated account to the colonial authorities of an immense river that spanned the continent to the north-west. This story prompted Thomas Mitchell to conduct his four expeditions of exploration into the interior of Australia. After being re-captured, Clarke was sent to the penal colony of Norfolk Island and was later hanged to death in Hobart in Van Diemen's Land.

== Early life ==
George Clarke was born in 1806 in Bewdley, England to William and Susanna Clarke. George spent part of his childhood working in London as a messenger-boy for the engineering firm of John Rennie the Elder, where he received an education. It appears that he returned to the mid-west of England to take up an apprenticeship as a barber, from which he obtained his later moniker of "The Barber".

== Arrest and transportation to New South Wales ==
In 1824, Clarke was arrested in Shropshire and charged with house-stealing and robbery under arms. He was tried at Shrewsbury on 11 August and found guilty. He was sentenced to death which was later commuted to transportation for life to New South Wales. Clarke was placed in a prison ship and then assigned to the convict vessel Royal Charlotte which sailed from Portsmouth in January 1825. The vessel arrived in Sydney in late April of the same year.

== Runaway convict living with Aborigines ==
Clarke was assigned as a convict labourer to the colonist Benjamin Singleton and was put to work upon Singleton's grant of land in the Hunter Valley. At this time, the frontier of British settlement in the area was the Liverpool Range and Singleton was making forays with his stockmen across this range into the Liverpool Plains in the search to acquire more grazing land.

In 1827, on one of these journeys to the Liverpool Plains, Singleton and 16 of his men had a skirmish with the local Gamilaraay people near what is now the town of Willow Tree. His group fired upon the Aboriginal men killing six and wounding many more. Clarke appears to have taken an active role in the shooting. Not long after this incident, Clarke absconded into the bush from his bonded service and, despite his recent violence to the Gamilaraay, managed to assimilate with a clan that lived further to the north along the Namoi River.

Clarke was accepted into their society, being viewed as a re-incarnation of one of their deceased relatives. He became immersed in their culture, learning their language, abandoning European clothing for a possum-skin cloak and acquiring at least one wife. He became initiated, probably at the Terry Hie Hie bora ground, with his skin being marked with the customary scarifications.

He was also able to reciprocate this exchange of culture by giving the clan his knowledge of European farming methods. At the clan's main settlement (which is now known as Barber's Lagoon near Boggabri) Clarke built a stockyard amongst their gunyahs and bark huts. He also made them familiar with techniques of stealing, butchering and skinning cattle. Another Aboriginal encampment with a European style shed was encountered in 1827 by the explorer Allan Cunningham near to what is now Warialda. This was probably also constructed by either by Clarke or through his influence.

Over the next four years, Clarke led men from this clan on cattle-stealing raids on the herds brought into the area by the British colonists. The stolen cattle were brought back to Barber's Lagoon where they were slaughtered for meat and hide to the benefit of the clan.

In early 1831, Clarke, possibly with his activities under pressure from the advancement of British colonisation and associated mounted police patrols, decided to return to Benjamin Singleton's patronage. He gave himself up at Singleton's Yarramanbar cattle station on the southern Liverpool Plains.

== Bushranger ==
Clarke's return to bonded servitude did not last long and in February 1831, he again absconded from Benjamin Singleton to be with his Aboriginal associates. This time though he took with him two other convict runaways and later joined up with further three or four. They formed a notable bushranging group and Clarke became known as "The Flying Barber".

His gang raided several Liverpool Plains properties of high profile colonists such as Richard Yeomans and William Cox, stealing horses, cattle and supplies. On a daring raid where his gang ranged as far as Maitland, Clarke was captured by police, but escaped custody while being escorted to Newcastle.

In September 1831, he led another raid where he stole a considerable cache of guns and ammunition. A dedicated police patrol led by Sergeant Sandy Wilcox was then organised to capture Clarke. On 3 October, Wilcox intercepted Clarke's gang 30 miles west of the Warrumbungle Range and arrested him. On the return, a large group of Gamilaraay people armed with spears forced the police to halt, demanding Clarke's release. Wilcox held a gun to Clarke's head while Clarke convinced his Aboriginal associates to disperse. Clarke was then escorted to Bathurst where he was imprisoned.

== Imprisonment and the story of the Kindur River ==
Clarke, who still chose to dress in traditional Aboriginal style with long hair held back by a white band and not much more clothing than a possum-skin rug, was followed to Bathurst by one of his Indigenous wives. He was placed in prison where he was interviewed by Lauderdale Maule, one of the soldiers in charge there. There had been rumours that while Clarke was living with the Aborigines, had come to know of a large river that spanned the continent. The authorities wished to know of this potentially important waterway and Maule was assigned to obtain the information from him.

Clarke, probably with the intention of avoiding incarceration, exaggerated a story of a large river that ran into the interior and emptied into the Timor Sea. He said the river was called the Kindur and it ran through ideal pastureland and hippopotamuses and orang-utans lived along its lower banks. This unsubstantiated information was passed onto the colonial administration whereupon Sir Thomas Mitchell became very interested in its content. Mitchell immediately started to organise a large expedition to confirm the veracity Clarke's tale.

Clarke wished to act as guide for this expedition but was refused. Instead he was ordered to be sent to Sydney for trial on charges of horse stealing and other crimes. In late November, his Aboriginal wife helped Clarke escape from Bathurst jail, but he was soon recaptured. Clarke and an accomplice were then placed in heavy irons and marched to Sydney under a strong escort of mounted police and soldiers. His wife was forcibly placed into the local "blacks camp".

== Norfolk Island ==
In February 1832, Clarke stood trial in Sydney and was found guilty of his crimes while as a bushranger. He was again sentenced to death, which was commuted to transportation to the penal settlement of Norfolk Island. He was placed into the Phoenix prison ship moored in Hulk Bay with other career criminals such as John Knatchbull to await transportation. While here, he was examined by Thomas Mitchell who had in the meantime conducted a journey of exploration that failed to find the so-called Kindur River. Mitchell came to the conclusion that Clarke had not been much further inland than the Nandewar Range. However, this did not deter Mitchell from conducting another three important expeditions looking for the mythical river.

In October 1832, Clarke was placed aboard the vessel Governor Phillip and sent to Norfolk Island. On this journey Clarke and 18 other convicts were accused of trying to orchestrate a mutiny whereby they would poison the crew, take control of the ship and sail it to South America. The mutiny failed but Clarke was not subject to further punishment as the authorities thought being sent to the notoriously harsh Norfolk Island settlement was already sufficient.

In 1834, Clarke was alleged to have been a leader in another failed convict mutiny this time at the actual prison on the island. However, he was judged to have played no active role, thereby avoiding being one of thirteen other convicts hanged for the rebellion.

Clarke managed to survive his three years incarceration on Norfolk Island and was returned to Sydney in March 1835.

== Transportation to Van Diemen's Land ==
Back in Sydney, Clarke was again transferred to the Phoenix prison ship. He was not released due to information that he was overheard threatening to do harm to Thomas Mitchell once he was given his freedom. Mitchell, himself, informed the authorities that he thought Clarke would cause "serious mischief" if he was released to return to his Aboriginal friends. It was therefore decided to retain Clarke in custody and transport him to the isolated penal colony of Van Diemen's Land where recent genocidal activity had cleared the island of virtually all the Aboriginal population; a place the authorities concluded where Clarke would have "no blacks to associate with".

== Death ==
Clarke arrived in Hobart in May 1835 and was assigned to a convict work gang at Oatlands. Within a month, he and two other convicts broke out of their shackles, obtained a firearm and robbed an elderly couple. They were arrested the same evening and later sent for trial. Clarke was found guilty and sentenced to death. He was hanged at the Hobart public gallows on 11 August 1835.
