= Victorine (ship) =

Ship lost in 1822

History
- Owner: Edward Lord
- Fate: Lost at sea 1822

General characteristics
- Tonnage: 70 tons

Victorine was a schooner of 70 tons built in Mauritius and registered in Hobart. Owned by Edward Lord, she disappeared off the coast of Australia in 1822.

On 24 August 1822, the schooner, under command of Captain William Risk, left Sydney bound for Mauritius. Carrying a crew of seven or eight the ship disappeared en route and was presumed lost.
