= Edward Broughton =

English convict and murderer

Edward Broughton (1803 – 5 August 1831) was an English convict turned serial killer who was transported to Van Diemen's Land for fourteen years for house-breaking. He escaped from Sarah Island in Macquarie Harbour with four other convicts and he later confessed to murdering three of his companions and resorting to cannibalism. He and the other survivor Matthew MacAlboy were hanged in Hobart for their crimes.

== Early life ==
Edward Broughton was born in Dorking in 1803, and had run away from home when he was eleven. He earned his living by petty thieving and later became a highway robber using violence.

In 1822 he was convicted of house breaking and served two years in Guildford Gaol. Another conviction for house breaking and he was transported to Van Diemans Land on board the Earl St Vincent in 1826. After being in the Colony for about 10 days he again started his criminal enterprise. He was caught stealing a blanket at Sandy Bay and was sentenced to the penal establishment at Sarah Island in Macquarie Harbour. 3 September 1830 five men ran away from the settlement, Richard Hutchinson, William Coventry, Patrick Fagan, Mathew Macavoy, and Broughton, and that they were upwards of thirty days before the two survivors surrendered themselves at Macguire's Marsh near Osterley.

== Trial and sentencing ==
The two survivors concocted the story that after running for six days they left Hutchison and Coventry behind after the men couldn't swim across a river. They later came across some hostile Indigenous occupants and Fagan got speared.

They were subsequently found guilty of being illegally at large, and were ordered for execution, the judge before whom they were tried, in passing sentence, exhorting them to repentance if their, consciences were burdened with murder, which there was much reason to fear was the case, with reference to their unfortunate companions.

== Confession ==
The day before execution Broughton burden with guilt made this confession,

"The first man we murdered was Hutchinson, we were nearly starving at the time, and we drew lots who should kill him; Hutchinson was asleep: the lot fell upon me, and I killed him with an axe, which we brought with us. He was cut to pieces, and with the exception of the intestines, hands, feet and head, the body was carried with us. We lived somedays on his flesh; we ate it heartily- I do not know how many days it lasted. After having thus committed murder, we began to be afraid of each other; one night I awoke Fagan, and told him to watch while I slept, and I would watch while he slept, for I feared that I should be murdered; we each of us feared, that on going to sleep we should be dispatched by the others. One night, as Coventry was cutting wood, we other three agreed to kill him; he was an old man of nearly sixty. I refused to do it as I said they ought to kill him among them, so we might all be in the same trouble. Fagan struck the old man the first blow with the axe; Coventry saw him coming, and cried out for mercy; he struck him just above the eye, but did not kill him – Macavoy and myself finished him and cut him in pieces. We lived upon his body for some days; we were not starving when we killed Coventry' we had only consumed the remains of Hutchinson the same day. We were not at all sparring of the food we obtained from the bodies of our companions: we eat it as if we had abundance-if we had been sparing of it, the one would have been sufficient for us. We now became daily more afraid of each other. Before we had consumed Coventry's body, Macavoy one night started up from the fire, and asked me to go down with him into the bush to see if we could find a kangaroo track, that we might set a snare for. When leaving the fire, Macavoy said, "Bring the axe with you." When we had gone about 300 yards, Macavoy laid down and asked me to stop and sit down. I was afraid; I thought he wanted to take away my life, and he was stronger than me. I then threw the axe further from him than from myself, so that if he attempted to take it, I thought I could get it before him. He did not offer to touch it, he then said, "there are three of us, Fagan is young and foolish, people will frighten him; and he will tell what has been done, now the only thing that we can do to pre- vent it is to kill him."' I said l would not agree to it, that I knew him better than he did, and was acquainted with his ways and that he would not tell. I could trust my life in his hands. Macavoy said that he was sure he would tell, he would be frightened, as there was three of us, he would turn evidence as to these murders, to save his own life, and we should be hanged; when there are only you and I together, we could not turn evidence against each other, we can say that we left them at Gordon's River, at the back of the Frenchman's Cap, because they could not swim over it, and then it would be supposed that they had lost themselves and perished in the bush, and then we should perhaps be sent to Norfolk Island. I replied that Fagan was a very good swimmer, and that he was known to be so as well as myself, and they would also know that I would not go away and leave him. We then returned to the fire and agreed not to kill him. When we went back he was lying down by the fire, his shoes were off, and his feet were towards the fire, he was warming them. I then threw the axe down, and he looked up and said, have you put any snares down Ned? I said no, I have not put any down, there are snares enough if you but know it. I sat by him; Macavoy sat beyond me, he was on my right hand, and Fagan on my left. I was wishing to tell Fagan what had passed, but could not, as Macavoy was sitting with the axe close to him, looking at us. Then I lay down, and was in a doze, when I heard Fagan scream out; i leaped up on my feet in a dreadful fright and saw Fagan lying on his back with a dreadful cut in his head, and the blood pouring from it; Macavoy was standing over him with the axe in his hand. I cried to Macavoy you murdering rascal, you blood-thirsty wretch, what have you done? He said this will save our lives, and then he struck him another blow on the head with the axe. Fagan then groaned, and Macavoy cut his throat with a razor through the windpipe. We then began to strip Fagin, we stripped him naked. Fagan had on a red shirt, which I had stolen from Bradshaw at the Settlement, and which occasioned words and ill-feeling between Macavoy and myself, as to whom should become possessed of it; Fagan had also a red comforter and cap, which I likewise stole from Bradshaw, and gave him. I robbed Bradshaw of all I could lay my hands on, I left him not a mouthful of food when I came away. Bradshaw had always been very kind to me, and gave me anything in his power: But I have endeavored to kill him by making a tree fall upon him on account of his being a Constable, and getting people flogged.

Fagan's body we cut up into pieces, and roasted it; we roasted all but the hands, feet, and head; we roasted all at once, upon all occasions, as it was lighter to carry, and would keep longer, and not be so easily discovered. About two days after Fagan's murder, we heard some dogs, they had caught a kangaroo, and the dogs were wild. We got the kangaroo, and threw away the remainder of the body. Two days after this we gave ourselves up. I wish this statement to be made public after my death that it may serve as a warning!"

== See also ==
- List of convicts transported to Australia
- Hells Gates
- Convicts on the West Coast of Tasmania
