= Henry Fulton =

Australian schoolmaster (1761–1840)

Henry Fulton (1761 – 17 November 1840) was a Church of Ireland curate who, as a United Irishman in 1798, was transported to New South Wales where in the Rum Rebellion, and the subsequent inquiries, he took the part of Governor William Bligh.

== Early life ==
Fulton was born in Lisburn, County Antrim, in the Kingdom of Ireland in 1761 and educated at Trinity College, Dublin from 1788, graduating B.A. in 1792. As a student, he met Theobald Wolfe Tone and, committed to Catholic Emancipation and reform, followed him into the Society of United Irishmen. He became the Church of Ireland curate in Silvermines, and vicar of Nenagh in County Tipperary, while remaining active in the now republican cause. He spied for the United Irishmen, carried messages and swore in new members. During the rebellion of 1798 he was chased by the Yeomanry from Nenagh to Newport, caught and imprisoned in Limerick.
