= Muster (census) =

In the colony of New South Wales, Australia, a muster was an extension of a Military Muster to the general populace. A general muster was held when deemed necessary to count the convicts and general population. Many people were not included. Musters were held in the years:

- 1788 A list of persons victualled in NSW and Norfolk Island
- 1806 A General Muster in NSW of convicts, emancipists, livestock and land.
- 1810 to 1820 Returns of convicts in the Colony on 1 January 1810 and of those who arrived up until September 1820.
- 1811 A General Muster in NSW, Port Dalrymple, Hobart Town and Norfolk Island
- 1814 A General Muster was held in NSW which was arranged by districts.
- 1818 Muster of free persons at Hobart Town.
- 1819 Muster of persons at Hobart Town and Port Dalrymple.
- 1820 and 1821 Muster of convicts and their children at Hobart Town.
- 1822 Muster supplying alphabetical returns of persons in NSW and also of convicts in Van Diemen's Land.
- 1823 Muster of convicts in Van Diemen's Land.
- 1825 General muster of all inhabitants in NSW, except the military.
- 1837 General muster of all convicts in NSW and Norfolk Island.
- 1841 Censuses of NSW, Adelaide, Van Diemen's Land and Port Phillip.
- 1891 Census of NSW.
