= Archibald Macarthur =

Australian Presbyterian minister

Archibald Macarthur (died 1847) was a Scottish Presbyterian minister who became the first Presbyterian minister in Australia when he arrived in Hobart in 1822.
