= Thomas Davey (governor) =

British marine and colonial administrator (1758–1823)

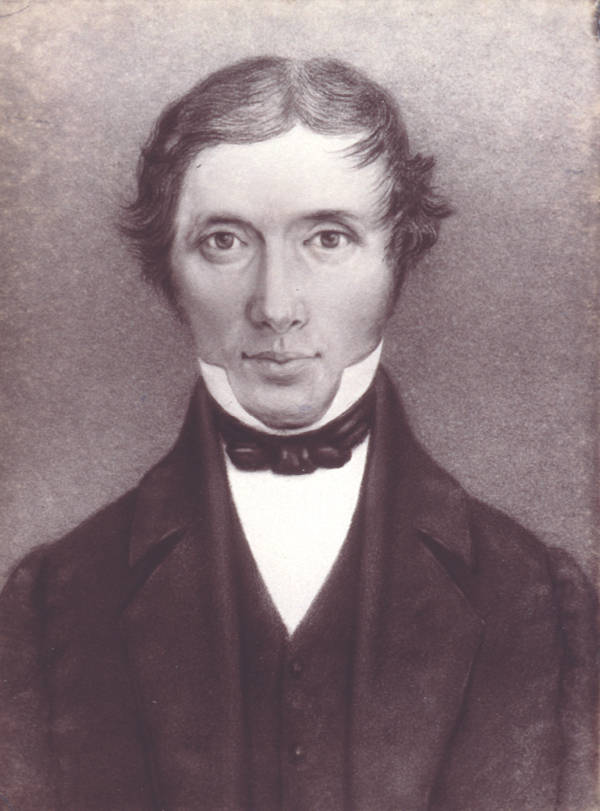

2nd Lieutenant Governor of Van Diemen's Land
- In office 4 February 1813 – 9 March 1817
- Governor: Lachlan Macquarie
- Preceded by: David Collins
- Succeeded by: William Sorell

Personal details
- Born: 1758
- Died: 2 May 1823 (aged 64–65) London, England
- Spouse: Margaret
- Children: One daughter (Lucy Margaret)

Thomas Davey (1758 – 2 May 1823) was a New South Wales Marine and member of the First Fleet to New South Wales, who went on to become the second Lieutenant Governor of Van Diemen's Land.

== Early life ==
Davey was born in England in 1758, the son of a mill owner. In 1775 Great Britain declared war on her American colonies; three years later Davey decided to enter the military with a view to serving overseas. Strenuous lobbying by Davey's father secured political patronage for a commission as second lieutenant in His Majesty's Marine Forces, and Davey was posted aboard HMS Vengeance in this capacity in 1779. In the following year he transferred to the 50-gun frigate HMS Preston and took part in attacks on French forces in the West Indies. He was promoted to first lieutenant in mid-1780 but fell ill shortly afterward and was invalided back to England. He did not return to active service until 1786.

It is said that he left England without informing his wife, but she got wind of his departure and, rushing, managed to get aboard. Upon being informed of her arrival Davey lost his temper and hurled his wig at the wall. All his possessions, which he later claimed had a value of £4500, were lost to an American privateer en route and Davey put in a claim of substantial length, partially for the loss of which he eventually received 8,000 acres of land.

== Van Diemen's Land ==
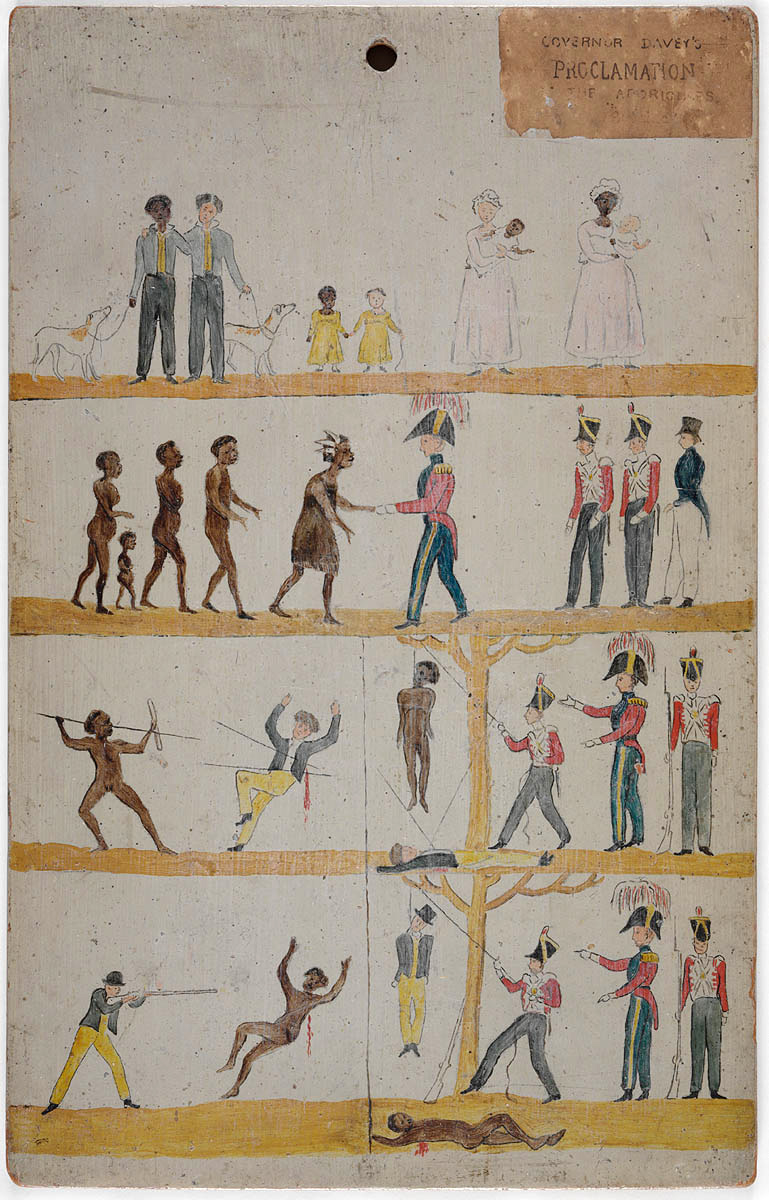
Proclamation board often wrongly attributed as "Governor Davey's Proclamation", painted in Van Diemen's Land about 1830 in the time of Governor Arthur. This was designed to show that colonists and aboriginals were equal before the law, and incorrectly depicted a policy of friendship and equal justice which simply did not exist at the height of the Black War.

Among Davey's closest civilian associates was John Beamont (1789–1872), who arrived in New South Wales with him in 1812 and soon proceeded to Van Diemen's Land, apparently serving as his secretary. Davey sought Beamont's appointment as Crown Agent and later as a magistrate, although Governor Lachlan Macquarie declined to approve these appointments. Beamont instead became postmaster-general and later held a succession of colonial offices, including naval officer, treasurer of the police fund, provost marshal and sheriff. His later memorial to Lord John Russell recalled that he had expected to accompany Davey in a more senior administrative capacity, illustrating the importance of patronage within the early colonial administration.

He is still remembered for his invention of the "Blow My Skull" punch, the recipe for which is found in Edward Abbott's The English and Australian Cookery Book.

Davey was confronted by one of the largest, most daring and successful bushranging gangs of Australian history, that of Michael Howe. Davey was checked and humiliated time and time again by Howe's exploits. Signing himself as "The Governor of the Rangers" in letters to Davey, Howe threatened to set the colony on fire from end to end and Davey feared that there would be a general uprising of the convicts.

== Legacy ==
As lieutenant governor he had encouraged humane treatment of Aborigines, and strong action against bushranging. His limited official powers had a consequential and negative effect in his subsequent reputation, as did his poor choices of subordinate officials.

His service is commemorated in the name of Port Davey in Tasmania, an inlet on the south west coast of Tasmania. Davey Street in Hobart is named in his honour. Richard Davey was a descendant.

His governorship of Tasmania was dramatised in the radio play His Excellency Governor Shirtsleeves.

== See also ==
- Governor Davey's Proclamation

== Bibliography ==
- Moore, John (1987). The First Fleet Marines. University of Queensland Press. ISBN 0702220655.

Preceded by David Collins	Lieutenant Governor of Van Diemen's Land; 1813–1817	Succeeded by William Sorell
