= Timeline of Australian history =

This is a timeline of Australian history, comprising important legal and territorial changes and political events in Australia and its predecessor states. To read about the background to these events, see history of Australia.

== Pre-written history ==
Year	Date	Event
c. 48,000–63,000 BC	–	The ancestors of Aboriginal Australians began arriving from south-east Asia 50,000 to 65,000 years ago, during the last glacial period. Arriving by sea, they settled the continent and had formed approximately 250 distinct language groups by the time of European settlement, maintaining some of the longest known continuing artistic and religious traditions in the world.
c. 2000 BC	–	The Torres Strait Islander people first settled Torres Strait Islands around 4000 years ago. Culturally and linguistically distinct from mainland Aboriginal peoples, they were seafarers and obtained their livelihood from seasonal horticulture and the resources of their reefs and seas.
–	–	In 1944, nine coins were found on Marchinbar Island, the largest island in the Wessel Islands of the Northern Territory of Australia. While four coins were identified as Dutch duits dating from 1690 to the 1780s, five with Arabic inscriptions were identified as being from the Kilwa Sultanate. The coins are now held by the Powerhouse Museum, Sydney, Australia. In 2018 another coin, also thought to be from Kilwa, was found on a beach on Elcho Island, another of the Wessel Islands.

== 16th century ==
Year	Date	Event
1521		Several writers have argued that Portuguese expeditions visited Australia at this time. However, historians generally disagree and the evidence remains contentious. (to 1522)

== 17th century ==
Year	Date	Event
1606	February/March	The Dutch East India Company (VOC) ship Duyfken, under Captain Willem Janszoon, explored the western coast of Cape York Peninsula, near what is now Weipa. This was the first recorded landfall by a European on Australian soil.
1606	August	Spanish seaman Luís Vaz de Torres sailed through the Torres Strait, between Australia and New Guinea, along the latter's southern coast. Torres reported 'shoals', some of which may have been the northernmost atolls of the Great Barrier Reef.
1616	25 October	Dutch captain Dirk Hartog in the Eendracht made the second recorded landfall by a European, at Dirk Hartog Island on the western coast of Australia. He left a commemorative plate, the Hartog Plate.
1618	July	VOC ship Mauritius under command of Supercargo Willem Janszoon, landed near North West Cape, near the modern town of Exmouth, and named Willem's River, later renamed Ashburton River.
1622	1 May	The English ship Tryall sighted Point Cloates on the west coast of Australia.
1622	25 May	The Tryall was wrecked on Tryal Rocks, northwest of the Montebello Islands, crew spent seven days ashore before sailing a longboat to Bantam in Java – this was the first recorded shipwreck in Australian waters and first extended stay in Australia by Europeans.
1623		Dutch captain Jan Carstensz navigated the Gulf of Carpentaria aboard the Pera and Arnhem. The Arnhem crossed the Gulf to reach and name Groote Eylandt.
1623		First white child in Australia was Born. Seebaer van Nieuwelant (born 27 July 1623), son of Willemtgen and Willem Janszoon, was born south of Dirk Hartog Island, in present-day Western Australia.
1629	4 June	VOC ship Batavia wrecked on Houtman Abrolhos, off Geraldton. Mutiny ensued and at least 110 men, women and children were murdered. First European structure in Australia – Wiebbe Hayes Stone Fort on West Wallabi Island.
1642		Dutch explorer Abel Tasman explored the west coast of Tasmania, landed on its east coast and named the island Anthoonij van Diemenslandt.
1656	28 April	In 1656 the Vergulde Draeck struck a submerged coral reef midway between what are now the coastal towns of Seabird and Ledge Point, Western Australia. On board were 193 crew, eight boxes of silver coins worth 78,600 guilders and trade goods to the value of 106,400 guilders. Of the 193 crew, 118 are believed to have perished. The initial 75 survivors, including the ship's captain Pieter Albertszoon, and the under steersman, made it to shore. They had with them the ship's boat, a schuyt, along with a small amount of provisions and stores washed on shore. A number of rescue attempts was conducted by the Dutch East India Company once the loss was reported.
1681		English navigator John Daniel on the New London charted the west coast of Australia, including Rottnest Island and the Wallabi Group of the Houtman Abrolhos.
1688		English explorer William Dampier explored the west coast of Australia.
1696		Dutch explorer Willem de Vlamingh charted the southwestern coast of Australia, making a landfall at Rottnest Island and the site of the present-day city of Perth.

== 18th century ==
Year	Date	Event
Since middle of 18th century	–	Makassar people from the region of Sulawesi in Indonesia began visiting the coast of Northern Australia sometime around the middle of the 18th century, first in the Kimberley region, and some decades later in Arnhem Land.
1770		English Lieutenant James Cook's expedition in HMS Endeavour charted the eastern coast, and claimed it for the British Crown. Australia was dubbed "terra nullius" i.e., according to the European legal precepts of the era, it was unclaimed by any sovereign nation.
1787	13 May	The First Fleet of 11 ships, led by Governor Arthur Phillip, departed from Great Britain for Australia to begin European colonisation.
1788	3 January	Captain Arthur Phillip of the (First Fleet), having decided to sail ahead of the rest of the fleet to prepare for the new settlement, sighted the coast of Van Diemen's Land.
1788	18 January	At 2:15 pm, the brig HMS Supply anchored on the northern side of Botany Bay. He began exploring the surrounding countryside and made contact with the Aboriginal Australians.
1788	19 January	In the morning, the transports Alexander, Friendship and Scarborough arrived at Botany Bay, watched by a large number of Indigenous Australians who gathered on Point Solander.
1788	20 January	The remaining seven ships of the First Fleet, led by HMS Sirius, anchored in Botany Bay.
1788	21 January	Deciding that Botany Bay was unsuitable for settlement, Captain Arthur Phillip set out with a party in three open boats to seek out another site. He later reported to Lord Sydney, British Secretary of State; "We got into Port Jackson early in the Afternoon, and had the satisfaction of finding the finest harbour in the world, in which a thousand Sail of the line may ride in the most perfect security." He selected a cove with a stream and named it Sydney Cove.
1788	24 January	The French ships Boussole and Astrolabe commanded by Jean-François de Galaup, comte de Lapérouse appeared off Botany Bay.
1788	25 January	Captain Phillip sailed out of Botany Bay aboard the Supply and reached Sydney Cove in the evening.
1788	26 January	Early in the morning, Captain Phillip took a party ashore at Sydney Cove, raised the British colours and formally proclaimed British sovereignty over New South Wales. This day is now celebrated as Australia Day. In a ceremony at sunset Phillip and the officers drank to the health of the king and the royal family, and success to the new colony. In the meantime, La Perouse entered Botany Bay as the remaining British ships prepared to leave.
1788	27 January	Convicts disembarked at Sydney Cove and helped clear the ground.
1788	28 January	17 Wives of marines and 14 children disembarked from Prince of Wales. They were the first women and children to land. The first of the livestock was brought ashore.
1788	3 February	Rev. Richard Johnson held the colony's first religious service ‘on the grass’.
1788	6 February	The women convicts came ashore. There was a violent thunderstorm.
1788	7 February	The whole party assembled on the west side of Sydney Cove, where the deputy judge-advocate David Collins read the King's commission establishing Phillip's governorship over the colony and the letters patent establishing civil and criminal courts. Phillip addressed the convicts, wishing them ‘reformation, happiness, and prosperity, in this new country'.
1788	11 February	At the first criminal court, Samuel Barnsley was sentenced to 150 lashes for assault and Thomas Hill to confinement in irons on a small rocky island at the head of the cove for stealing bread.
1788	14 February	Lt. Philip Gidley King sailed with a party of 23 including 15 convicts, in Supply to found a settlement on Norfolk Island, where native flax was to be harvested and others grown.
1788	17 February	Rev. Johnson celebrated Holy Communion for the first time in the colony, according to the rites of the Church of England (see Book of Common Prayer (1662)). The Communion took place in the tent of Lt. Ralph Clark. Lt. Henry Ball, commander of the Supply on its way to Norfolk Island, discovered an island that he named after Admiral Lord Howe.
1788	27 February	Thomas Barratt was hanged for stealing in stores, the first execution.
1788	29 February	James Freeman was pardoned for stealing flour, on the condition that he become public executioner.
1788	2 March	Phillip set out to explore Broken Bay. On this trip he visited and named Pittwater.
1788	6 March	Lt. King took possession of Norfolk Island. British settlement founded.
1788	10 March	The two French ships left Botany Bay, and were later wrecked near Santa Cruz (Solomon Islands).
1788	March	Phillip issued the first government conservation order: that no trees should be cut down within 50 feet (15 metres) of the stream that ran into Sydney Cove.
1788	26 April	An exploring party led by Phillip sighted and named the Blue Mountains.
1788	6 May	Following an outbreak of scurvy, HMS Supply sailed for Lord Howe Island to catch turtles to supplement the settlement's meat supply. Having failed to catch any, it returned on 25 May.
1788	21 May	Aboriginal peoples killed a convict and seriously injured another.
1788	30 May	The bodies of two rushcutters, William Okey and Samuel Davis, were found pierced with spears and beaten, evidently on reprisal for stealing a canoe belonging to Aboriginals. The next day Phillip led a party to apprehend the murderers, but he was unable to identify them.
1788	June	Owing to the neglect of the convict who was supposed to look after them, two bulls and four cows strayed from the settlement and were lost.
1788	5 July	In a despatch to the under-secretary of state, Evan Nepean, Phillip recorded the rations for marines and male convicts. For seven days each received 7 pounds of bread or in lieu thereof 7 pounds of flour, 7 pounds of beef or in lieu thereof pork, 3 pints of pease, (Note: transcribed in April 2014 as "pins of pease" but "pints" makes more sense, and the "pease" would be dried peas, not the cooked porridge.) 6 ounces of butter, 1 pound of flour or in lieu thereof 12 pounds of rice. The women received two-thirds of this amount and the children generally had one-third although some received as much as the women.
1788	20 August	Lt. William Bligh in HMS Bounty, en route to Tahiti, anchored at Adventure Bay, Van Diemen's Land. The party planted apple trees, fruit stones and various vegetables before departing on 4 September.
1788	28 September	Phillip decided to send HMS Sirius to Cape Town for urgently needed food supplies.
1788	September	The last remaining cow was killed.
1788	2 November	A party of marines from the New South Wales Marine Corps and 10 convicts left to establish a farming settlement at Rose Hill (Later called Parramatta).
1788	19 November	The last two ships of the First Fleet, Golden Grove and Fishburn, sailed for England with despatches and reports.
1788	11 December	Phillip set out to explore Botany Bay, where he examined the Cook's, George's and Woronora Rivers.
1788	31 December	Because the Aboriginal Australians could not be coaxed into the settlement, one named Arabanoo was captured and held in confinement. Phillip hoped to learn his language and so to promote good relations between Aboriginal Australians and Europeans.
1790	3–28 June	5 of 6 ships of the beleaguered Second Fleet arrived. The colony was gripped by a food crisis.
1791	9 July	The first ship of the Third Fleet arrived at Sydney Cove.
1792	–	Two French ships, Recherche and Espérance, anchor at Recherche Bay, near the southernmost point of Tasmania.
1792	–	Governor Philip returned to England, accompanied by Bennelong, who became the first Australian-born person to sail to Europe.
1797	–	Sydney Cove was wrecked and some survivors travelled from Bass Strait to Port Jackson, enabling the rescue of others. This also furthered knowledge of the geography of Australia.
1798	–	George Bass and Matthew Flinders sailed from Sydney and circumnavigated Tasmania, thus proving it to be an island. (to 1799)

== 19th century ==
Year	Date	
1803		Matthew Flinders completed the first circumnavigation of the continent
1804		A settlement was founded at Risdon on the Derwent River in Van Diemen's Land
1804	4–5 March	Castle Hill convict rebellion, also known as the second Battle of Vinegar Hill, occurred in New South Wales.
1804	20 February	The Risdon settlement was moved to Sullivan's Cove (now Hobart) by Colonel David Collins.
1808		The Rum Rebellion
1813		Blaxland, Lawson and Wentworth crossed the Blue Mountains.
1813		Matthew Flinders referred to New South Wales by the name "Australia".
1817		John Oxley charts the Lachlan River
1817		Australia's first bank, the Bank of New South Wales, opened in Macquarie Place, Sydney. (The bank became Westpac in 1982).
1817		Governor Lachlan Macquarie petitioned the British Admiralty to use the name "Australia" instead of "New Holland"
1818		Oxley charted the Macquarie River.
1824		A penal colony was founded at Moreton Bay, now the city of Brisbane.
1824		Bathurst and Melville Islands were annexed.
1824		Permission was granted to change the name of the continent from "New Holland" to "Australia"
1824		The Hume and Hovell expedition travelled overland to Port Phillip Bay and encountered the Murray River
1825		The New South Wales western border was extended to 129° E. Van Diemen's Land was proclaimed.
1826	26 December	New South Wales established first settlement in Western Australia at King George Sound as a convict-supported military garrison, named Frederick Town but renamed Albany in 1832
1827	21 January	The whole of Australia was claimed as British territory when Major Edmund Lockyer formally annexed the western portion in a ceremony at King George Sound.
1829		Charles Sturt charted the Darling River.
	2 May	Captain Charles Fremantle took possession of the western side of Australia for the British crown.
	12 August	The settlement of Perth was founded.
1830		Sturt arrived at Goolwa, having charted the Murray River.
	7 October	The Black Line, a huge six-week military offensive, is launched, using moving cordons to drive all Aboriginal Tasmanians from the colony's settled districts to the Tasman Peninsula.
1831	7 March	Administration of King George Sound passes to Swan River Colony, convicts returned to New South Wales.
1831	18 April	The Sydney Herald (later to become The Sydney Morning Herald) was first published.
1832		Swan River Colony had its name changed to Western Australia.
1833		The penal settlement of Port Arthur was founded in Van Diemen's Land.
1834		The Tolpuddle Martyrs are transported to Sydney and Hobart.
1835	30 August	John Batman and John Pascoe Fawkner established a settlement at Port Phillip, now the city of Melbourne.
1835		William Wentworth established Australian Patriotic Association, Australia's first political party, to demand democracy for New South Wales.
1836	28 December	Province of South Australia proclaimed with its western border at 132° E.
1838		First Prussian settlers arrived in South Australia; the largest group of non-British migrants in Australia at the time.
1839		Paul Edmund Strzelecki became the first European to ascend and name Australia's highest peak, Mount Kosciuszko.
	9 September	HMS Beagle sailed into Darwin Harbour during its surveying of the area. John Clements Wickham named the area Port Darwin in honour of their former shipmate Charles Darwin. The settlement became the town of Palmerston in 1869 and was renamed Darwin in 1911.
1840		Australia's first municipal authority, the City of Adelaide, was established, followed by Sydney City Council.
1841	1 July	New Zealand was proclaimed as a separate colony, no longer part of New South Wales.
1842		Copper was discovered at Kapunda in South Australia.
1843		Australia's first parliamentary elections was held for the New South Wales Legislative Council (though voting rights are restricted to males of certain wealth or property).
1845	4 August	The ship Cataraqui was wrecked off King Island in Bass Strait. It is Australia's worst civil maritime disaster, with 406 lives lost.
1845		Copper was discovered at Burra in South Australia.
		Grand Orange Lodge of Australia is established.
1849	1 June	Western Australia became a penal colony.
1850		Australian Colonies Government Act [1850] granted representative constitutions to New South Wales, Victoria, South Australia and Tasmania. These colonies set about writing constitutions which produced democratically progressive parliaments.
1850	1 October	Australia's first university, the University of Sydney, was founded.
1851	1 July	Victoria separated from New South Wales.
1851		The Victorian gold rush started when gold was found at Summerhill Creek and Ballarat.
1851	15 December	Forest Creek Monster Meeting of miners at Chewton near Castlemaine
1852		Francis Cadell, in preparation for the launch of his steamer service, explored the Murray River in a canvas boat, travelling 1,300 miles (2,100 km) downstream from Swan Hill.
1853		First paddle steamers on Murray River on the spring flood. From South Australia, the Lady Augusta captained by Francis Cadell, reached Swan Hill while Mary Ann captained by William Randell, made it as far as Moama (near Echuca).
1853		Bendigo Petition and Red Ribbon Rebellion at Bendigo
1854	3 December	The Eureka Stockade
1855		The transportation of convicts to Norfolk Island ceased.
1855		All men over 21 years of age obtained the right to vote in South Australia.
1856	1 January	Van Diemen's Land name changed to Tasmania.
1857		Victorian Committee reported that a 'federal union' would be in the interests of all the growing colonies. However, there was not enough interest in or enthusiasm for taking positive steps towards bringing the colonies together.
1857		Victorian men achieved the right to vote.
1858		Sydney and Melbourne linked by electric telegraph.
1858		New South Wales men achieved the right to vote.
1859	6 August	SS Admella wrecked off south-east coast of South Australia with the loss of 89 lives.
1859		Australian rules football codified, Melbourne Football Club founded
1859	6 June	Queensland separated from New South Wales with its western border at 141° E.
1860		John McDouall Stuart reached the centre of the continent. The South Australian border changed from 132° E to 129° E.
1861		The ill-fated Burke and Wills expedition occurred.
1861		Skiing in Australia introduced by Norwegians in the Snowy Mountains goldrush town of Kiandra.
1862		Stuart reached Port Darwin, founding a settlement there. Queensland's western border was moved to 139° E.
1863		South Australia took control of the Northern Territory which was previously part of the colony of New South Wales.
1864		Great Fire of Brisbane
1867		Gold was discovered at Gympie, Queensland.
1867		Saint Mary MacKillop founded Sisters of St Joseph of the Sacred Heart.
1868		The transportation of convicts to Western Australia ceased.
1869		Children of Australian Aboriginal and Torres Strait Islander descent are removed from their families by Australian and State government agencies. This practice lasted 100 years and is known as the Stolen Generation.
1872	22 August	The Overland Telegraph Line linking Darwin and Adelaide opened.
1873		Uluru was first sighted by Europeans, and named Ayers Rock.
1875	24 February	SS Gothenburg strikes Old Reef off Bowen, North Queensland and sank with the loss of approximately 102 lives.
1875	September	Adelaide Steamship Company was formed.
1878		First horse-drawn trams in Australia commenced operations in Adelaide.
1877	15–19 March	The first internationally recognised game of Test Cricket is played between Australia and England at the Melbourne Cricket Ground (MCG).
1879		The first congress of trade unions was held.
1880	11 November	The bushranger Ned Kelly was hanged.
1880		Parliamentarians in Victoria became the first in Australia to be paid for their work.
1882		First water-borne sewerage service in Australia commenced operations in Adelaide.
1883		The opening of the Sydney–Melbourne railway.
1883		Silver was discovered at Broken Hill
		The first direct Inter-colonial passenger trains began running between Adelaide and Melbourne.
		Gold was discovered at Southern Cross, Western Australia.
1888		Louisa Lawson established The Dawn: A Journal for Australian Women.
1889		The completion of the railway network between Adelaide, Brisbane, Melbourne and Sydney.
1889	24 October	Sir Henry Parkes delivered the Tenterfield Oration.
1890		The Australian Federation Conference called a constitutional convention.
1890	26 April	Banjo Paterson published "The Man from Snowy River"
1891		A National Australasian Convention met and agreed on adopting the name "the Commonwealth of Australia," also drafting a constitution.
1891		The first attempt at a federal constitution was drafted.
1891		The Convention adopts the constitution, although it had no legal status
1891		A severe depression hit Australia
1893		The Corowa Conference (the "people's convention") called on the colonial parliaments to pass enabling acts, allowing the election of delegates to a new constitutional convention aimed at drafting a proposal and putting it to a referendum in each colony.
1894		South Australia became the first Australian colony, and the second place in the world, to grant women the right to vote, as well the first Parliament in the world to allow women to stand for office with the Constitutional Amendment (Adult Suffrage) Act 1894.
1895		The premiers, except for those of Queensland and Western Australia, agreed to implement the Corowa proposals.
1895		"Waltzing Matilda" was first sung in public, in Winton, Queensland
1896		The Bathurst Conference (the second "people's convention") met to discuss the 1891 draft constitution.
1897		In two sessions, the Second National Australasian Convention met (with representatives from all colonies except Queensland present). They agreed to adopt a constitution based on 1891 draft, and then revised and amended it later that year. Catherine Helen Spence became the first female political candidate for political office, standing for election as a representative for South Australia.
1898		The Convention agreed on a final draft to be put to the people.
1898		After much public debate, the Victorian, South Australian and Tasmanian referendums were successful; the New South Wales referendum narrowly failed. Later New South Wales voted "yes" in a second referendum.
1899		The decision was made to site the national capital in New South Wales, but not within 100 miles of Sydney.
1899	22 September	Queensland's offer of troops for the Second Boer War is accepted by the Imperial Government.
1899	4 November	The New South Wales Lancers arrived in Cape Town from London to begin Australia's participation in the Second Boer War.
1899	6 November	The Australian contingent to the Boer War departs Albany on the Medic.
1899	1–7 December	The Australian Labor Party held office for a few days in Queensland, becoming the first trade union party to do so anywhere in the world.
1899	22 December	Western Australia enacted full women's suffrage.
1900		Several delegates visited London to resist proposed changes to the agreed-upon constitution.
1900		The constitution was passed by the Parliament of the United Kingdom as a schedule to the Commonwealth of Australia Constitution Act, and was given royal assent

== 20th century ==
Year	Date	Event
1901	1 January	Australia becomes a federation. Edmund Barton becomes the 1st Prime Minister of Australia; the 7th Earl of Hopetoun becomes Governor-General. Black death strikes Australia, just over 100 people killed in Sydney.
1901		The first parliament met in Parliament House, Melbourne
1901		The Immigration Restriction Act was introduced forming the basis of the White Australia policy
1901		The Australian National Flag was flown for the first time
1902		The Franchise Act guarantees women the right to vote in federal elections (by this stage, most states had already done this). However, it excludes most non-European ethnic groups, including Aboriginal people, unless already registered to vote on State roles.
1902		King Edward VII approved the design of the Australian flag.
1902	27 February	Breaker Morant is executed for having shot Boers who had surrendered
1903	25 August	The High Court of Australia is established with Samuel Griffith as the first Chief Justice.
1903		The Defence Act gives the federal government full control over the Australian Army
1903	16 December	1903 Australian federal election: Alfred Deakin is elected as the 2nd Prime Minister of Australia.
1904		A site at Dalgety, New South Wales chosen for the new national capital
1904		Chris Watson forms the first federal Labor (minority) government
1904	27 April	Deakin resigns and Chris Watson assumes office as the 3rd Prime Minister of Australia.
1904	18 August	George Reid becomes the 4th Prime Minister of Australia.
1905	5 July	Alfred Deakin returns to the position of prime minister.
1906		Australia takes control of south-eastern New Guinea
1906	12 December	1906 Australian federal election: Alfred Deakin is reelected.
1908		Dorothea Mackellar publishes My Country
1908		The Dalgety proposal for the national capital is revoked, and Canberra is chosen instead.
1908	27 August	Birth of Donald Bradman in Cootamundra, New South Wales.
	13 November	Andrew Fisher becomes 5th Prime Minister of Australia.
1909		The first powered aeroplane flight in Australia is made.
1909	2 June	Alfred Deakin becomes prime minister.
1910		Andrew Fisher forms the first federal majority Labor government.
1910	29 April	Andrew Fisher become prime minister.
1911		The Royal Australian Navy is founded
1911		The Northern Territory comes under Commonwealth control, being split off from South Australia
1911		The first national census is conducted.
1911		Australian Capital Territory proclaimed.
1912	July	Australia sends women to the Olympic Games for the first time
1912	22 October	The Central Flying School RAAF, the foundation for the Royal Australian Air Force, is founded
1912	23 May	Walter Burley Griffin and Marion Mahony Griffin win the design competition for the new city of Canberra
1913	20 February	The foundation stone for the city of Canberra is put in place
1913	20 March	Canberra is officially named as the Capital of Australia.
	31 May	1913 Australian federal election: Joseph Cook elected as the 6th Prime Minister of Australia.
1914		Australian soldiers are sent to the First World War. This was first time Australians had fought under the Australian flag, as opposed to that of Britain's.
1914	17 September	Andrew Fisher becomes prime minister.
1915	25 April	Australian soldiers land at ANZAC Cove on the Gallipoli Peninsula in Turkey.
1915		Jervis Bay Territory comprising 6,677 hectares surrendered and becomes part of the Australia Capital Territory.
1915		Surfing is first introduced to Australia
1915	27 October	Billy Hughes became the 7th Prime Minister of Australia.
1916		Hotels are forced to close at 6 p.m., leading to the beginning of the "six o'clock swill"
1916		Australia suffers heavy casualties in the Western Front Battle of the Somme
1916		The Returned Sailors’ and Soldiers’ Imperial League of Australia, the forerunner to the Returned and Services League of Australia is founded
1916		The Labor government under Billy Hughes splits over conscription. First referendum on conscription is rejected
1917		Second referendum on conscription is rejected. Transcontinental railway linking Adelaide to Perth is completed.
1917	5 May	1917 Australian federal election: Billy Hughes reelected as prime minister.
1917	31 October	Battle of Beersheba: Australian 4th Light Horse Brigade launches last cavalry charge in modern warfare to capture Beersheba from the Ottoman Turks.
1918		Battle of Amiens: Australian troops spearhead 8 August offensive against Hindenburg Line: the "black day of the German Army". On 12 August, Australian commander General Sir John Monash is knighted in the field of battle by King George V
1918	11 November	First World War ends – 60,000 Australians dead.
1918	17 December	The Darwin Rebellion takes place, with 1,000 demonstrators demanding the resignation of the Administrator of the Northern Territory, John A. Gilruth.
1919		Prime Minister Billy Hughes signs Treaty of Versailles: the first signing of an international treaty by Australia. Australia obtains League of Nations mandate over German New Guinea.
1919	13 December	1919 Australian federal election: Billy Hughes reelected as prime minister.
1920		The airline Qantas is founded
1921	12 March	Edith Cowan becomes the first woman elected to an Australian parliament
1922		The Smith Family charity is founded in Sydney
1922	2 September	Death of Henry Lawson aged 55.
	16 December	1922 Australian federal election: Billy Hughes reelected as prime minister.
1923		Vegemite is first produced
1923	9 February	Stanley Bruce became 8th Prime Minister of Australia.
	28 July	Construction begins on the Sydney Harbour Bridge.
1925	16 December	1925 Australian federal election: Stanley Bruce reelected as prime minister.
1926		The first Miss Australia contest is held
1927	9 May	The tenth parliament is formally opened in Canberra, finalising the move to the new capital.
	13 June	Slim Dusty (David Kirkpatrick), Country Music Singer and Musician is Born in Kempsey, New South Wales.
1928		Bert Hinkler makes the first successful flight from Britain to Australia, and Charles Kingsford Smith makes the first flight from the United States to Australia. The Shrine of Remembrance is built.
1929		Western Australia celebrates its centenary
1929		Labor returns to office under James Scullin. The Great Depression hits Australia.
1930	6 January	New South Wales batsman Don Bradman scores a world record first-class individual innings of 452 not out in a Sheffield Shield match against Queensland
1930	11 July	In the Third Test at Leeds against England, Don Bradman scored a Hundred before Tea, a Hundred before lunch, and a Hundred by the end of the day's play, 309 in Total. He went on to make 334. Altogether in his 52 Test career, Bradman scored 29 Hundreds, 12 Double Hundreds and 2 Triple Hundreds. This is therefore the fastest Triple Hundred in Test History.
1930	27 September	Sydney–Brisbane railway opens connecting New South Wales with Queensland by rail
	4 November	Phar Lap wins his only Melbourne Cup
1931		Sir Douglas Mawson charts 4,000 miles of Antarctic coastline and claims 42% of the icy mass for Australia
	23 February	Death of Dame Nellie Melba aged 69.
1932	19 January	Construction on the Sydney Harbour Bridge is completed.
1932	19 March	The Sydney Harbour Bridge opens.
1932		The Labor government falls and Joseph Lyons becomes prime minister.
1933	8 April	Western Australia votes at a rerefendum to secede from the Commonwealth, but the vote is ignored by both the Commonwealth and British governments.
1935	8 November	Sir Charles Kingsford Smith disappears. He was 38.
1936		The last thylacine dies.
1937		The radio series Dad and Dave begins.
1938	5–12 February	Sydney hosts the Empire Games, the forerunner to the Commonwealth Games.
1939	13 January	Victoria is devastated by the Black Friday bushfires.
1939	7 April	Prime Minister Joseph Lyons dies in office and is replaced by Robert Menzies and the first Menzies Government.
1939	September	Australia enters the Second World War following the German Invasion of Poland. The 2nd Australian Imperial Force is raised.
1939		The first flight is made by an Australian-made warplane, the Wirraway.
1940		A team of scientists, under Howard Florey, develops penicillin
1940		Fascist Italy enters war, Royal Australian Navy engages Italian Navy in the early stages of the Battle of the Mediterranean.
1941		3 Divisions of the 2nd Australian Imperial Force join operations in the Mediterranean. After initial successes against Italy, 2nd AIF suffered defeat against the Germans in Greece, Crete, and North Africa.
1941		Apr–Aug, Australian garrison (Rats of Tobruk) halt advance of Hitler's panzers for the first time during the Siege of Tobruk.
1941		Menzies resigns and John Curtin becomes prime minister in the Curtin government of 1941–45.
1942	February	Singapore falls, 15,000 Australians become Prisoners of War of the Japanese
1942		Japanese air raids – almost 100 attacks against sites in the Northern Territory, Western Australia and Queensland (to 1943). Bombing of Darwin sees largest attack on Australia by a foreign power.
1942		The Royal Australian Navy and 6th and 7th Divisions of 2nd AIF are recalled from Mediterranean Theatre to participate in the anticipated Battle for Australia.
1942		Sparrow Force engages in guerilla campaign in Battle of Timor (to 1943)
1942	4 May – 8 May	Battle of the Coral Sea: United States and Royal Australian Navy halt advance of the Japanese towards Port Moresby (Australian Territory of Papua)
1942	21 July – 16 November	Battle of Kokoda Trail: Australian soldiers halt Japanese march on Port Moresby
1942	Aug–Sep	Australian forces inflict the first defeat on the Imperial Japanese Army in the Battle of Milne Bay.
1942	Jul–Nov	Australia's 9th Division plays crucial role in the First and Second Battle of El Alamein, which turned the North Africa Campaign in favour of the Allies.
1942		National daylight saving is introduced as a war time measure.
1942	9 October	The UK Statute of Westminster is formally adopted by Australia. The Statute formally grants Australia the right to pass laws that conflict with UK laws.
1943	4 March	Australia wins its first Oscar, with cinematographer Damien Parer honoured for Kokoda Front Line! documentary.
1943		2,815 Australian POWs die constructing Japan's Burma-Thailand Railway
1943		Australian forces engage Japan in New Guinea, Wau, and the Huon peninsula. (to 1944)
1944	5 August	Cowra breakout, mass escape of Japanese prisoners of war occurs in NSW.
1944		Japanese inflict Sandakan Death March on 2,000 Australian and British prisoners of war – only 6 survive. The single worst war crime perpetrated against Australians.
1944		Australian forces battle Japanese garrisons from Borneo to Bougainville.
1944		The Pharmaceutical Benefits Scheme is introduced, providing subsidised medicine to all Australians
1945		the Liberal Party of Australia is established with Robert Menzies as its first leader.
1945		Australian forces lead Battle of Borneo
1945	7 May	Nazi Germany surrenders
1945	July	Prime Minister Curtin dies and is replaced, briefly by Frank Forde, then by Ben Chifley and the Chifley Labor government
1945	14 August	Japan surrenders
1945		Australia becomes a founding member of the United Nations
1945	26 December 1945 – 3 January 1946	The Sydney to Hobart Yacht Race is held for the first time
1946		Minister for Immigration Arthur Calwell introduces the major post-war immigration scheme
1946		Norman Makin, is voted in as the first President of the United Nations Security Council.
1948		Minister for External Affairs, Dr. H. V. Evatt is elected President of the United Nations General Assembly.
1948		Holden starts manufacturing its first Australian designed and built car. The First Model is the 48/215 followed by the FJ, FE, FC, FB, EK, EJ, EH, HD, HR, HK, HT, HQ, HJ, HX. The Holden Commodore was introduced in 1978 and started off with the VB, VH, VK, VL, VN, VT, VY, VZ, VE. Due to financial problems, Holden will no longer manufacture cars in Australia from 2017.
1948		Australia becomes a signatory to the Universal Declaration of Human Rights.
1949		All indigenous ex-servicemen and any Indigenous Australians who are eligible to vote in State Elections (NSW, VIC, SA and TAS) are given an unrestricted right to vote in federal elections.
1949	26 January	The Nationality and Citizenship Act is passed. Rather than being identified as subjects of Britain, the Act established Australian citizenship for people who met eligibility requirements.
1949	17 October	Construction of the Snowy Mountains Hydro-Electric Scheme officially begins
1949	10 December	1949 Australian federal election: Robert Menzies returns to power as leader of the new Liberal Party Menzies Government.
1950		Australian troops are sent to the Korean War to assist South Korea. (to 1953)
1951		Voters reject a referendum to change the Constitution to allow the Menzies Government to ban the Communist Party
1951	1 September	Australia signs the ANZUS treaty with the United States and New Zealand
1952	3 October	Operation Hurricane: First nuclear test conducted in Australian territory by the United Kingdom off the coast of Western Australia.
1954		Elizabeth II and Prince Philip make a royal visit; the Soviet diplomat Vladimir Petrov defects, leading to the Petrov Affair and another split in the Labor Party
1955		Democratic Labor Party splits from Australian Labor Party over concerns of Communist influence in the labour movement
1955		Australia becomes involved in Malayan Insurgency
1955		Hotels in New South Wales no longer have to close at 6 p.m., ending the "six o'clock swill"
1956	16 September	Television in Australia is launched.
1956	22 November – 8 December	The 16th Summer Olympics is held in Melbourne
1956		Performing artist Barry Humphries introduces Edna Everage to the Australian stage
1957		The song "Wild One" makes Johnny O'Keefe the first Australian rock'n'roller to reach the national charts.
1957		Slim Dusty's Australian country music hit "A Pub with No Beer" becomes the first Australian song to attain international chart success.
1959	1 March	Construction begins on the Sydney Opera House. It will eventually cost $102 Million.
1962		Robert Menzies' Commonwealth Electoral Act provided that all Indigenous Australians should have the right to enrol and vote at federal elections, removing remaining restrictions applying in QLD, WA and NT.
1962	16 April	Sydney–Melbourne rail corridor opens with Spirit of Progress connecting New South Wales to Victoria by rail
1962		Malayan Insurgency ends
1964	12–20 June	The Beatles' 1964 world tour reach Australia
1964	10 February	82 sailors die when HMAS Voyager sinks after collision with HMAS Melbourne
1964		The editors of Oz magazine are charged with obscenity
1964		Prime Minister Robert Menzies announces the reintroduction of compulsory military service for men aged from 18 to 25 years old
1964		First troops sent to Vietnam War.
1965		Indigenous Australians gain right to vote in state of Queensland
1966		The ban on the employment of married women in the Commonwealth Public Service is lifted
1966	26 January	Robert Menzies retire as Australia's longest-serving prime minister and is succeeded by Harold Holt.
1966	26 January	The Beaumont Children Jane (9), Arnna (7), and Grant (4) disappear from Glenelg Beach.
	14 February	Decimalisation; the Australian currency is changed to dollars and cents, with the Australian dollar replacing the Australian pound.
1967	3 February	Ronald Ryan becomes the last person legally executed in Australia.
1967	7 February	Black Tuesday bushfires devastate large areas of Hobart and south-eastern Tasmania; 64 people were killed.
1967	9 February	Gough Whitlam becomes leader of the Labor Party
1967	27 May	The constitution is changed to allow Aboriginal Australians to be included in the population count and for the federal government to legislate for them
1967		Sydney is rocked by a series of brutal underworld killings
1967		Talkback radio is introduced
1967	17 December	Prime Minister Harold Holt disappears while swimming at Cheviot Beach, Victoria
1967	19 December	Holt was officially presumed dead by the government. Governor-General Lord Casey swore John McEwen in as prime minister, on an interim basis pending the Liberal Party electing its new leader
1968	10 January	John Gorton replaces John McEwen as Prime Minister
1968	24 June	British comedian Tony Hancock commits suicide in Sydney
1968	1 July	Australia signs the Treaty on the Non-Proliferation of Nuclear Weapons
1968		Aboriginal boxing champion Lionel Rose defeats Masahiko "Fighting" Harada in Japan to become the world bantamweight champion
1968		Australia's first liver transplant operation is performed in Sydney
1969		French conceptual artist Christo 'wraps' Little Bay in Sydney
1969	November	Renowned author-artists Norman Lindsay and May Gibbs die
1969		The Australian production of the rock musical Hair premieres in Sydney
1969		Top pop groups the Easybeats and the Twilights break up; Tim Burstall directs 2000 Weeks, the first All-Australian feature released since Charles Chauvel's Jedda in 1958
1969	25 October	1969 Australian federal election: John Gorton reelected as prime minister.
1970		More than 200,000 people participate in the largest demonstrations in Australian history, against the Vietnam War
1971		Neville Bonner becomes the first Aborigine to become an Australian Member of Parliament;
1971	10 March	John Gorton resigns as prime minister and is succeeded by William McMahon
1971		The 1971 South Africa rugby union tour of Australia sparks protest all throughout Australia. Premier of Queensland Joh Bjelke-Petersen declares a state of emergency in QLD in response to escalating protest.
1971		Daylight saving is introduced to New South Wales, Victoria, Queensland, South Australia and the Australian Capital Territory.
1971		Green Bans begin in Hunters Hill, Sydney and spread across New South Wales.
1972		The Commonwealth Conciliation and Arbitration Commission rules that women doing the same job as men have the right to be paid the same wage.
1972		Queensland discontinues Daylight Saving.
1972		Aboriginal Tent Embassy erected in response to the Coalition government's approval of exploration licences and mining tenements on reserves
1972	July	Supersonic passenger plane Concorde lands in Darwin
1972	2 December	1972 Australian federal election: The first Labor government since 1949 is elected under the leadership of Gough Whitlam
1972		Australia recognises the People's Republic of China
1973	20 October	The Sydney Opera House formally opened by Elizabeth II
1973		The White Australian Policy (established 1901) is officially dismantled
1973		Vietnam War ends
1973		The federal voting age is dropped from 21 to 18
1973		Unionists save the historic The Rocks area of Sydney from demolition by introducing Green Bans
1973		Patrick White becomes the first Australian to win the Nobel Prize in Literature
1974		"Advance Australia Fair" recognised as Australia's national song, but not as national anthem.
1974	24–25 December	Darwin is devastated by Cyclone Tracy.
1975		The Privy Council (Appeals from the High Court) Act removes the right to appeal High Court decisions to the British Privy Council. Appeals to the Privy Council direct from State Supreme Courts remain until 1988.
1975	5 January	The Hobart Bridge collapsed. A bulk ore carrier travelling on the Derwent River collided into several pylons of the Tasman Bridge killing a total of 12 people. These included 7 crew on board the ship and 5 people that were in 4 cars which drove 45m off the bridge into the Derwent River.
1975	17 September	Papua New Guinea gains independence from Australian rule
1975		South Australia becomes the first state in Australia to legalise homosexual acts between consenting adults in private.
1975		Whitlam government introduced the Aboriginal Land (NT) Bill into Parliament. The bill proposed land rights in the Northern Territory based on land claimed on grounds of need as well as traditional affiliation and traditional landowners maintaining control over mining and development.
1975		A constitutional crisis occurs when Malcolm Fraser delays supply, threatening a government shutdown until Governor-General John Kerr dismisses Prime Minister Gough Whitlam on 11 November 1975. Kerr then appointed Malcolm Fraser, Leader of the Opposition, as caretaker prime minister.
1975	13 December	1975 Australian federal election: Malcolm Fraser wins elections and becomes Prime Minister
1976		The Australian Capital Territory legalises homosexuality between consenting adults in private.
1977	18 January	Granville rail disaster killed eighty-three people
1978	24 June	First Sydney Gay and Lesbian Mardi Gras
1979		Australian women win the right to maternity leave
1979		Kakadu National Park and the Great Barrier Reef Marine Park are both proclaimed.
1980	17 August	Baby Azaria Chamberlain disappears from a campsite at Uluru (Ayers Rock), reportedly taken by a dingo.
1980	18 October	1980 Australian federal election: The Coalition is elected.
1981		A referendum is held in Tasmania to vote for whether or not the Franklin Dam should be built.
1982	30 September – 9 October	12th Commonwealth Games held in Brisbane.
1982		The National Gallery of Australia is opened.
1983	16 February	The Ash Wednesday bushfires kill 71 people.
1983	5 March	1983 Australian federal election: Bob Hawke defeats Fraser and leads Labor back to government.
1983	14 – 26 September	Australia wins the America's Cup
1983	12 December	The Australian dollar is floated.
1984	19 April	"Advance Australia Fair" is proclaimed as Australia's official national anthem.
1984	1 February	Medicare is established.
1984	14 May	The one dollar coin is issued to replace the one dollar note.
1984	1 December	1984 Australian federal election: Labor wins.
1985		The government grants the freehold title of a large area of land in central Australia, including prominent landmarks Uluru and Kata Tjuta, to the Mutitjulu people, who in turn give them a 99-year lease. The last state to do so (New South Wales) abolishes capital punishment.
1986		The Australia Act removes the right of appeal from State courts to the British Privy Council, making the High Court the final court of appeal in Australia. The Act also removes all remaining rights of the UK parliament to pass law for Australia.
1986	2 February	Murder of Anita Cobby in Sydney.
1986	27 March	Russell Street Bombing in Melbourne.
1986		Crocodile Dundee is released in Australia.
1987	9 August	Hoddle Street massacre kills 7 victims and injures 19
1987	1 December	Sir Joh Bjelke-Petersen resigns as Premier of Queensland after 19 years at the top.
1987	8 December	Queen Street massacre kills 8 victims and injures 5.
1988	26 January	Australia celebrates its bicentenary, with large celebrations and major funding for capital works projects.
1988	3 September	Federal referendums on 4-year parliamentary terms, recognition of local government and other issues are defeated.
1988	30 April – 30 October	Brisbane hosts World Expo 88.
1988	9 May	The new Parliament House opens in Canberra.
1989		Newcastle earthquake kills 13 people. ACT gains self-Government. The Kempsey bus crash and Grafton bus crash kill a total of 56 people.
1989		Queensland commences three-year trial of Daylight Saving.
1989		Rosemary Follett (Australian Labor Party) becomes the first Chief Minister of the Australian Capital Territory and the first woman to become head of government in an Australian state or territory.
1990		Royal Australian Navy deployed in preparation for the First Gulf War. Carmen Lawrence becomes the first female premier of an Australian state. Labor wins the 1990 federal election.
1991	4 July	Prominent heart surgeon Victor Chang is gunned down.
1991	17 August	Seven people die in the Strathfield massacre.
1991	21 August	The Coode Island chemical storage facility in Melbourne explodes, leaving a toxic cloud hanging over the city for days.
1991	2 September	Council for Aboriginal Reconciliation Act 1991 is passed; reconciliation in Australia policy established.
1991	20 December	Paul Keating replaces Bob Hawke to be the 24th Prime Minister of Australia.
1992		The High Court delivers the Mabo Decision, which rules that indigenous native title does exist. This effectively extinguishes the concept of terra nullius. New South Wales Premier Nick Greiner resigns.
1992	22 February	Queensland holds a referendum on daylight saving, which is defeated with a 54.5% 'no' vote.
1993	13 March	1993 Australian federal election: Keating defeats John Hewson; the Australian Greens stand candidates for the first time.
1995		The Northern Territory legalises voluntary euthanasia, but it is overruled by the federal government when Liberal MP Kevin Andrews proposes the Euthanasia Laws Bill 1996
1996		The High Court hands down the Wik Decision, which holds that indigenous native title can survive the granting of pastoral leases.
1996	2 March	1996 Australian federal election: Liberal John Howard becomes prime minister, defeating Paul Keating after a record 13 years of Labor government
1996		Howard government leads all Australian states and territories agree to introduce uniform gun laws following the deaths of 35 people in the Port Arthur massacre
1997		Expelled Liberal MP Pauline Hanson forms the One Nation Party
1997	1 May	Tasmania legalises homosexuality
1997	30 July	1997 Thredbo landslide: Eighteen people die when the Bimbadene and Carinya Lodges collapse at Thredbo Alpine Village at 11.30 p.m.
	22 November	Michael Hutchence, lead singer of INXS, is found dead in his hotel room.
1998		A major strike results when Patrick Stevedores attempt to introduce non-union labour to reduce the influence of the Maritime Union of Australia
1998		The Australian Securities Exchange is demutualized and floated as a public company, becoming the world's first stock exchange to be listed on an exchange.
1999	26 August	Both houses of the federal parliament pass a Motion of Reconciliation signifying both recognition of and regret at past mistreatment of indigenous Australians.
1999	6 November	A referendum on changing to a republic is unsuccessful
1999		Howard government deploys Australian forces to East Timor to lead the INTERFET mission, following violence in wake of East Timorese vote for independence.
2000	1 July	Howard government introduces a Goods and Services Tax
2000	15 September – 1 October	27th Summer Olympic Games held in Sydney.

== 21st century ==
Year	Date	Event
2001		Australia celebrates centenary of federation.
2001	25 February	Death of Donald Bradman, aged 92 in Kensington Park, Adelaide, South Australia.
2001		Western Australia adopts a uniform age of consent of 16.
2001		Boat load of asylum seekers is rescued by Norwegian ship, leading to the Tampa affair.
2001		Australian forces deployed to War to topple Taliban for supporting Al-Qaeda.
2001	10 November	2001 Australian federal election: John Howard is reelected as prime minister.
2002	12 October	2002 Bali bombings, the deadliest act of terrorism in the history of Indonesia, killing 202 people (including 88 Australians).
2003		Australian military deployed to Iraq War to oust the Saddam Hussein regime for serial non-compliance with the 1991 Gulf War Peace Treaty.
2003		Northern Territory introduces uniform age of consent set at 16 for everyone.
2003		New South Wales becomes the last State to have a uniform age of consent at 16 for everyone.
2003		Australia hosts the Rugby World Cup, with the home side losing the final to England.
2003	19 September	Country music singer and musician Slim Dusty dies, aged 76.
2004	9 September	A bomb explodes outside the Australian embassy in Jakarta, Indonesia.
2004	9 October	2004 Australian federal election: Howard government (Liberal-National Coalition) wins fourth term and defeats Mark Latham led Australian Labor Party.
2005	December	Sydney beachside suburb of Cronulla sees a protest against the alleged bashing of a beach lifeguard, developing into an alcohol-fuelled, racially charged riot.
2006	15–26 March	The Commonwealth Games are held in Melbourne.
2006	4 September	Wildlife conservationist and television personality Steve Irwin dies, aged 44.
2006	8 September	Motor racing driver Peter Brock dies, aged 61.
2006		Australian Forces are again deployed to East Timor to help stabilize the country.
2007		Australia avoids recession amidst 2008 financial crisis (to 2010).
2007	24 November	2007 Australian federal election: Kevin Rudd (Australian Labor Party) defeats John Howard (Liberal-National Coalition) to become the 26th Prime Minister of Australia.
2008	22 January	Actor Heath Ledger dies from an accidental prescription drug intoxication, aged 28.
2008	13 February	Kevin Rudd leads bi-partisan Parliament to formally apologise for the Stolen Generations.
2008		Longest heatwave for an Australian capital city recorded in Adelaide.
2008	15–20 July	Sydney hosts Catholic World Youth Day.
2008	5 September	Quentin Bryce assumes office, becoming the first female Governor-General of Australia.
2009	7 February – 14 March	Black Saturday bushfires: Massive bushfires swept across Victoria, resulting in 173 fatalities.
2010	23–24 June	Julia Gillard challenged and replaced Kevin Rudd as leader of the Labor Party to become the 27th and first female Prime Minister of Australia.
2010	17 October	Mary MacKillop canonised as Australia's first Saint of the Roman Catholic Church.
2010	21 August	2010 Australian federal election: Election results in hung Parliament and narrow victory by Julia Gillard (ALP) over Tony Abbott (Lib-Nat Coalition); Liberal Ken Wyatt becomes the first Aboriginal member elected to the Australian House of Representatives.
2011		Queensland is affected by major flooding, followed by Cyclone Yasi.
2012	1 July	Carbon price introduced by the Gillard government.
2013	21 March	Julia Gillard apologises to victims of forced adoption practices for removal of babies from predominantly young single mothers.
2013	26 June	Kevin Rudd defeats Julia Gillard in a leadership spill, 57 votes to 45. Gillard resigns from parliament, Rudd is again sworn in as prime minister.
2013	7 September	2013 Australian federal election: Tony Abbott defeats Kevin Rudd to become the 28th Prime Minister of Australia.
2014	14 July	Carbon price is dropped by the Abbott government.
2014	21 October	21st Prime Minister of Australia Gough Whitlam dies, aged 98.
2014	15–16 December	2014 Sydney hostage crisis.
2015	20 March	22nd Prime Minister of Australia Malcolm Fraser dies, aged 84.
2015	15 September	Malcolm Turnbull defeats Tony Abbott in a leadership spill, 54 votes to 44. Turnbull is sworn in as the 29th Prime Minister of Australia.
2015		The Matagurup Refugee Camp is founded in Perth to defend Aboriginal Rights.
2016	2 July	2016 Australian federal election: Malcolm Turnbull remains as Prime Minister of Australia.
2016	21 November	A Thunderstorm asthma event in Melbourne kills 10 people and sends thousands to emergency departments
2017	Late July	John Cameron sets off the chain of events that became the 2017 Australian parliamentary eligibility crisis.
2017	9 December	Same-sex marriage is legalised by the Marriage Amendment (Definition and Religious Freedoms) Act 2017.
2018	24 August	Following two leadership spills, Scott Morrison succeeds Malcolm Turnbull as leader of the Liberal Party and is sworn in as the 30th Prime Minister of Australia.
2019	18 May	2019 Australian federal election: Scott Morrison remains as Prime Minister of Australia.
2019		Bushfires occur throughout late 2019 in every state and territory, destroying 2600 homes and killing 34 people.
2020	31 January	The ACT becomes the first Australian region to legalise recreational cannabis.
2020		Australia suffers lockdowns and social restrictions due to the COVID-19 pandemic.
2021	15 September	The AUKUS security partnership between Australia, the United Kingdom, and the United States is announced after negotiations.
2022	23 February – 7 April	2022 eastern Australia floods
2022	23 May	2022 Australian federal election: Anthony Albanese (Australian Labor Party) defeats Scott Morrison (Liberal-National Coalition) to become the 31st Prime Minister of Australia.
2022	8 September	Elizabeth II, the longest-reigning Australian monarch in history, dies aged 96, after a reign of 70 years. Charles III becomes the new Australian monarch.
2023	14 October	The Australian Indigenous Voice referendum fails to pass, with 60% of Australians voting "No".
2023	9 November	Tuvalu and Australia signed the Falepili Union
2024	14 January	Mary Donaldson becomes the first Australian-born queen consort of a European monarchy when she is proclaimed Queen of Denmark when her husband Frederik X ascends the throne.
2024	13 April	Bondi Junction stabbings kills 6 victims and injures 12
2025	3 May	2025 Australian federal election: Anthony Albanese remains as Prime Minister of Australia.
2025	6 October	Papua New Guinea and Australia signed the Pukpuk Treaty
2025	14 December	Bondi Beach shooting kills 16 and injures 40.
2026	6 July	Fiji and Australia signed the Veitacini Treaty
2026	19 October	Federal member for Indi Helen Haines is attacked in Wangaratta

== See also ==
- List of monarchs of Australia
- List of prime ministers of Australia
- History of Western Australia
- Timeline of Adelaide
- Timeline of Brisbane
- Timeline of Darwin
- Timeline of Gold Coast, Queensland
- Timeline of Melbourne
- Timeline of Sydney
- Timeline of Tasmania
