= 1898 in Australia =

- Decades: 1870s; 1880s; 1890s; 1900s; 1910s
- See also: Other events of 1898; Timeline of Australian history

The following lists events that happened during 1898 in Australia.

== Incumbents ==
=== Premiers ===
- Premier of New South Wales - George Reid
- Premier of South Australia - Charles Kingston
- Premier of Queensland - Hugh Nelson (until 13 April), Thomas Joseph Byrnes (died in office 27 September) then James Dickson
- Premier of Tasmania - Edward Braddon
- Premier of Western Australia - John Forrest
- Premier of Victoria - George Turner

=== Governors ===
- Governor of New South Wales – Henry Brand, 2nd Viscount Hampden
- Governor of Queensland – Charles Cochrane-Baillie, 2nd Baron Lamington
- Governor of South Australia – Sir Thomas Buxton, 3rd Baronet
- Governor of Tasmania – Jenico Preston, 14th Viscount Gormanston
- Governor of Victoria – Thomas Brassey, 1st Earl Brassey
- Governor of Western Australia – Gerard Smith

== Events ==
- 6 May - The paddle steamer Maitland sinks near Broken Bay, drowning 24 people.
- 3–4 June - A referendum is held in New South Wales, South Australia, Tasmania and Victoria to approve the draft Constitution of Australia. The constitution was accepted by the required majority in South Australia, Tasmania and Victoria, but not in New South Wales.
- 17 October - The Perth Zoo opens with two lions and a tiger.
- 26 December - Gatton murders - Three members of the same family are sexually molested and murdered near the town of Gatton, Queensland (unsolved).
- The Queen Victoria Building in Sydney is completed

== Science and technology ==
Nothing much that is important happened to do with science and technology.

== Arts and literature ==
- W. Lister Lister wins the Wynne Prize for landscape painting or figure sculpture for his landscape The Last Gleam

== Sport ==
- The Grafter wins the Melbourne Cup
- Victoria wins the Sheffield Shield

== Births ==
- 12 February - Sali Herman (died 1993), war artist
- 17 May - Stanley Frederick Utz (died 1974), businessman
- 20 May - Matthew O'Sullivan (died 1967), senator and salesmen
- 24 September - Howard Florey (died 1968), pharmacologist and Nobel Prize winner
- 9 December - Irene Greenwood (died 1992), radio broadcaster, feminist and peace activist

== Deaths ==
- 20 March - Sir Arthur Hunter Palmer (born 1819), Premier of Queensland
- 30 July - Mary Colton (born 1822), philanthropist and suffragist
- 19 September - George Edward Grey (born 1812), Governor of South Australia
- 27 September - Thomas Joseph Byrnes (born 1860), Premier of Queensland
- 2 November - George Goyder (born 1826), Surveyor-General of South Australia

== See also ==
- List of Australian films before 1910
