= 1893 in Australia =

- Decades: 1870s; 1880s; 1890s; 1900s; 1910s
- See also: Other events of 1893; Timeline of Australian history

The following lists events that happened during 1893 in Australia.

== Incumbents ==
=== Premiers ===
- Premier of New South Wales – George Dibbs
- Premier of South Australia – John Downer (until 16 June) then Charles Kingston
- Premier of Queensland – Samuel Griffith (until 27 March), Thomas McIlwraith (until 27 October) then Hugh Nelson
- Premier of Tasmania – Henry Dobson
- Premier of Western Australia – John Forrest
- Premier of Victoria – William Shiels (until 23 January) then James Patterson

=== Governors ===
- Governor of New South Wales – Victor Child Villiers, 7th Earl of Jersey until March, then Robert Duff
- Governor of Queensland – Henry Wylie Norman
- Governor of South Australia – Algernon Keith-Falconer, 9th Earl of Kintore
- Governor of Tasmania – Jenico Preston, 14th Viscount Gormanston
- Governor of Victoria – John Hope, 1st Marquess of Linlithgow
- Governor of Western Australia – William C. F. Robinson

== Events ==
- 30 January – The Federal Bank collapses, starting the Australian banking crisis of 1893.
- 4 February – 1893 Brisbane flood devastates Queensland.
- 20 January to 29 March – Adelaide receives no measurable rainfall for sixty-nine consecutive days, still a record since observations started in 1839.
- 14 June – Gold discovered at Kalgoorlie, Western Australia by Paddy Hannan and two others.
- Queensland is granted its Coat of Arms
- Coolgardie and Esperance are both declared as towns
- Archduke Franz Ferdinand of Austria spends time hunting kangaroos and emus in Australia

== Arts and literature ==
Bay View Gavotte 1893 by William Stanley
MIDI version

== Sport ==
- Tarcoola wins the Melbourne Cup
- Victoria wins the inaugural Sheffield Shield

== Births ==
- 10 January – Albert Jacka (died 1932), recipient of the Victoria Cross
- 11 January – Charles "Chook" Fraser (died 1981), rugby league footballer and coach
- 13 January – Roy Cazaly (died 1963), Australian Rules footballer
- 30 April – Harold Breen (died 1966), public servant
- 21 May – Giles Chippindall, (died 1969), public servant
- 4 August – Amy Hannah Adamson (died 1963), school principal
- 8 October – William Morrison (died 1961), Governor General of Australia
- 22 November – Robert Nimmo (died 1966), army officer
- 2 December – Raphael Cilento (died 1985), medical administrator
- 9 December – Ivo Whitton (died 1967), golfer

== Deaths ==
- 4 September – Francis William Adams, writer (born 1862)
- 17 October – Josiah Howell Bagster, land agent and politician (born 1847)
- 27 February Victor Marcus Coppleson, Australian surgeon (born 1893)
