= 1889 in Australia =

- Decades: 1860s; 1870s; 1880s; 1890s; 1900s
- See also: Other events of 1889; Timeline of Australian history

The following lists events that happened during 1889 in Australia.

== Incumbents ==
- Monarch - Victoria

=== Premiers ===
- Premier of New South Wales – Henry Parkes until 16 January, then George Dibbs 17 January-7 March, then Henry Parkes
- Premier of Queensland – Boyd Dunlop Morehead
- Premier of South Australia – Thomas Playford II until 27 June, then John Cockburn
- Premier of Tasmania – Philip Fysh
- Premier of Victoria – Duncan Gillies

=== Governors ===
- Governor of New South Wales – Lord Carrington
- Governor of Queensland – Henry Wylie Norman
- Governor of South Australia – Sir William Robinson until 5 March, then 9th Earl of Kintore
- Governor of Tasmania – Sir Robert Hamilton
- Governor of Victoria – Lord Loch
- Governor of Western Australia – Sir Frederick Broome

== Arts and literature ==
- 17 August – The 9 by 5 Impression Exhibition, featuring works by Tom Roberts, Arthur Streeton and Charles Conder, was opened in Melbourne.
- 21 December – The poem "Clancy of the Overflow", by Banjo Paterson, is first published in The Bulletin magazine.

== Sport ==
- 5 October – Norwood defeat Port Adelaide by 2 goals to win the 1889 SAFA Grand Final, the first Grand Final in Australian rules football.
- November – Bravo wins the Melbourne Cup

== Births ==
- 23 February – Lucy Godiva Woodcock, pacifist, schoolteacher, trade union official and women's activist (died 1968)
- 6 March – William Douglas Francis, botanist (died 1959)
- 4 April – Jack Cato, photographer (died 1971)
- 18 April – Jessie Street, feminist and suffragette (died 1970)
- 20 April – Cuthbert Butler, politician (died 1950)
- 2 June – Margaret Theadora Allan, community worker (died 1968)
- 18 September – Doris Blackburn, politician (died 1970)
- 27 October – Fanny Durack, swimmer (died 1956)
- 23 November – Harry Sunderland, rugby league administrator (died 1964)

== Deaths ==
- 9 February – Peter Lalor, Eureka Stockade leader (born 1827)
- 5 November – Peter Warburton, explorer (born 1813)
