= 1895 in Australia =

- Decades: 1870s; 1880s; 1890s; 1900s; 1910s
- See also: Other events of 1895; Timeline of Australian history

The following lists events that happened during 1895 in Australia.

== Incumbents ==
=== Premiers ===
- Premier of New South Wales was George Reid
- Premier of South Australia was Charles Kingston
- Premier of Queensland was Hugh Nelson
- Premier of Tasmania was Edward Braddon
- Premier of Western Australia was John Forrest
- Premier of Victoria was George Turner

=== Governors ===
- Governor of New South Wales – Robert Duff until 21 March, then Henry Brand, 2nd Viscount Hampden
- Governor of Queensland – Henry Wylie Norman until 31 December
- Governor of South Australia – Algernon Keith-Falconer, 9th Earl of Kintore until 10 April, then Sir Thomas Buxton, 3rd Baronet
- Governor of Tasmania – Jenico Preston, 14th Viscount Gormanston
- Governor of Victoria – John Hope, 1st Marquess of Linlithgow until 12 July, then Thomas Brassey, 1st Earl Brassey
- Governor of Western Australia – William C. F. Robinson until 22 December, then Gerard Smith

== Events ==
- 8 August - The steamship SS Catterthun strikes Seal Rocks, NSW, and founders, killing 55 persons
- 17 August - The Albert Railway Bridge opens in Brisbane
- 10 December - Launceston, Tasmania becomes the first Australian city to be powered by hydro-electricity with the opening of the Duck Reach Power Station

== Arts and literature ==
- 6 April - The song Waltzing Matilda is first performed at the North Gregory Hotel, Winton, Queensland.
- Banjo Paterson publishes his first major collection of poetry, The Man from Snowy River and Other Verses
- Tom Roberts painted Bailed Up
- Little Donah Polka published under the name 'Ansell Hope' (unidentified)
- Reverend Alfred Wheeler (composer) publishes Sailing Together

== Sport ==
- Auraria wins the Melbourne Cup
- Victoria wins the Sheffield Shield

== Births ==
- 6 January – Hudson Fysh, aviator, joint founder of Qantas (d. 1974)
- 6 March – Les Holden, WWI fighter ace (d. 1932)
- 14 March – Duncan Thompson, rugby league footballer, coach and administrator (d. 1980)
- 22 March – Archie Cameron, politician (d. 1956)
- 29 March – George Alan Vasey, army officer (d. 1945)
- 13 April – Ivan Stedman, swimmer (d. 1979)
- 18 August – Sibyl Morrison, barrister (d. 1961)
- 31 October – Les Darcy, boxer (d. 1917)

== Deaths ==
- 21 October – Louisa Anne Meredith, poet (b. 1812 in the United Kingdom)
- 29 December – Arthur Sidney Olliff, taxonomist (b. 1865 in the United Kingdom)
