= General Norman =

General Norman may refer to:

- Charles Norman (British Army officer) (1891–1974), British Army major general
- Francis Norman (1830–1901), Bengal Army lieutenant general
- Henry Wylie Norman (1826–1904), British Indian Army general
- Marciano Norman (born 1954), Indonesian Army lieutenant general
