= 1896 in Australia =

- Decades: 1870s; 1880s; 1890s; 1900s; 1910s
- See also: Other events of 1896; Timeline of Australian history

The following lists events that happened during 1896 in Australia.

== Incumbents ==
- Monarch - Victoria

=== Governors of the Australian colonies ===
- Governor of New South Wales – Henry Brand, 2nd Viscount Hampden
- Governor of Queensland – Charles Cochrane-Baillie, 2nd Baron Lamington (from 9 April)
- Governor of South Australia – Sir Thomas Buxton, 3rd Baronet
- Governor of Tasmania – Jenico Preston, 14th Viscount Gormanston
- Governor of Victoria – Thomas Brassey, 1st Earl Brassey
- Governor of Western Australia – Sir Gerard Smith

=== Premiers of the Australian colonies ===
- Premier of New South Wales – George Reid
- Premier of Queensland – Hugh Nelson
- Premier of South Australia – Charles Kingston
- Premier of Tasmania – Edward Braddon
- Premier of Western Australia – John Forrest
- Premier of Victoria – George Turner

== Events ==
- 13 February - The Capsize of the ferry Pearl on the Brisbane River, killing 28
- 27 October Passengers Alighting from Ferry Brighton at Manly the first film shot and screened in Australia

== Arts and literature ==
- While the Billy Boils, a collection of short stories, is published by Henry Lawson
- Augustus Juncker (1855–1942) publishes English duet edition of I was dreaming popularised in the French opera Ma mie Rosette

== Sport ==
- 7 to 11 April – Edwin Flack wins gold medals in the 800-metre and 1500 metre events, and bronze in the tennis doubles at the Games of the 1st Olympiad. He was the only Australian competitor at these games.
- 3 October – The Victorian Football League is formed, with competition beginning in 1897.
- 3 November – Newhaven wins the Melbourne Cup - the first horse-racing films produced in Australia.
- New South Wales wins the Sheffield Shield

== Births ==
- 22 January – Norman Gilroy, first Australian-born Cardinal (died 1977)
- 8 February – Alfred Percival Bullen, circus proprietor (died 1974)
- 18 February – John Cramer, politician (died 1994)
- 5 July – Thomas Playford, Premier of South Australia (died 1981)
- 11 July – Evelyn Scotney, coloratura soprano (died 1967)
- 18 July – Jack Mullens, politician (died 1978)
- 3 August – Charles Adermann, politician (died 1979)
- 24 August – Edwin Corboy, politician (died 1950)
- 28 August – Arthur Calwell, politician (died 1973)
- 8 September – Marion Allnutt, welfare worker, commanding officer of the NGO, Women's Australian National Services (died 1980)
- 15 September – Norman Lethbridge Cowper, lawyer (died 1987)
- 29 September – Thomas James Bede Kenny, soldier and Victoria Cross recipient (died 1953)
- 3 October – Auvergne Doherty, businesswoman (died 1961]
- 21 October – Patrick Gordon Taylor, aviator (died 1966)
- 16 November – Joan Lindsay, author (Picnic at Hanging Rock) (died 1984)
- 27 November – Arthur Percy Sullivan, soldier and Victoria Cross recipient (died 1937)

== Deaths ==
- 27 April – Sir Henry Parkes (born 1815), politician
- 15 September – John Anderson Hartley (born 1844), educator
- 10 October – Ferdinand von Mueller (born 1825), botanist

== See also ==
- List of Australian films before 1910
