= 1897 in Australia =

- Decades: 1870s; 1880s; 1890s; 1900s; 1910s
- See also: Other events of 1897; Timeline of Australian history

The following lists events that happened during 1897 in Australia.

== Incumbents ==
=== Premiers ===
- Premier of New South Wales - George Reid
- Premier of South Australia - Charles Kingston
- Premier of Queensland - Hugh Nelson
- Premier of Tasmania - Edward Braddon
- Premier of Western Australia - John Forrest
- Premier of Victoria - George Turner

=== Governors ===
- Governor of New South Wales – Henry Brand, 2nd Viscount Hampden
- Governor of Queensland – Charles Cochrane-Baillie, 2nd Baron Lamington
- Governor of South Australia – Sir Thomas Buxton, 3rd Baronet
- Governor of Tasmania – Jenico Preston, 14th Viscount Gormanston
- Governor of Victoria – Thomas Brassey, 1st Earl Brassey
- Governor of Western Australia – Gerard Smith

== Events ==
- 7 January - Darwin has its highest ever daily rainfall with 296.1 millimetres from its most severe cyclone until Tracy.
- 22 June - The second Victoria Bridge is opened in Brisbane by the Governor of Queensland, Lord Lamington. The previous bridge was destroyed by floodwaters
- 2 October - The first issue of the radical paper Tocsin is published.
- 27 October - St Patrick's Cathedral, Melbourne is consecrated

== Arts and literature ==
- Walter Withers wins the inaugural Wynne Prize for landscape painting or figure sculpture for his landscape The Storm

Queensland Braille Writing Association was formed in Brisbane - later became Braille House

== Sport ==
- 4 September - Essendon wins the first Victorian Football League premiership.
- 8 October - The Australasian Athletic Union is established in Sydney.
- Gaulus wins the Melbourne Cup
- New South Wales wins the Sheffield Shield

== Births ==
- 10 February - Judith Anderson (died 1992), actress
- 6 July - Frank Walsh (died 1968), Premier of South Australia
- 9 July - Enid Lyons (died 1981), politician
- 28 July - James Fairbairn (died 1940), politician
- 6 August - William Slim (died 1970), Governor General of Australia
- 5 October - Percy Spender (died 1985), politician and diplomat
- 7 October - Charles Chauvel (died 1959), film maker

== Deaths ==
- 11 June - Henry Ayers (born 1821), Premier of South Australia
- 11 July - Patrick Jennings (born 1831), Premier of New South Wales
- 15 August - Lily Poulett-Harris (born 1873), founder of women's cricket in Australia
- 15 November - Alfred Kennerley (born 1810), Premier of Tasmania
- 20 November - Ernest Giles (born 1835), explorer
