= Governor Preston =

Governor Preston may refer to:

- James Patton Preston (1774–1843), 20th Governor of Virginia
- Jenico Preston, 14th Viscount Gormanston (1837–1907), Governor of the Leeward Islands from 1885 to 1887, Governor of British Guiana from 1887 to 1893, and Governor of Tasmania from 1893 to 1900

== See also ==
- Preston Smith (governor) (1912 2003), 40th Governor of Texas
- Preston Lea (1841–1916), 52nd Governor of Delaware
- Preston Leslie (1819–1907), 26th Governor of Kentucky
