= Utz =

Utz or UTZ may refer to:

== Art and entertainment ==
- Utz (film), a 1992 film based on Bruce Chatwin's novel
- Utz (novel), Bruce Chatwin's 1988 novel, his last
- "Utz", a song by Enon from their 2003 album Hocus Pocus

== Other uses ==
- Utz (name), a list of people with the name
- UTZ Certified, a worldwide certification program for responsible coffee and other products
- Utz Brands, an American manufacturer of snack foods
- Utz Site, a Native American archeological site
- Utz Spur, a ridge in Antarctica

== See also ==
- Uz (disambiguation), the name of several biblical personages
