= 1891 in Australia =

- Decades: 1870s; 1880s; 1890s; 1900s; 1910s
- See also: Other events of 1891; Timeline of Australian history

The following lists events that happened during 1891 in Australia.

== Incumbents ==
=== Premiers ===
- Premier of New South Wales - Henry Parkes (until 23 October) then George Dibbs
- Premier of South Australia - Thomas Playford II
- Premier of Queensland - Samuel Griffith
- Premier of Tasmania - Philip Fysh
- Premier of Western Australia - John Forrest
- Premier of Victoria - James Munro

=== Governors ===
- Governor of New South Wales – Victor Child Villiers, 7th Earl of Jersey
- Governor of Queensland – Henry Wylie Norman
- Governor of South Australia – Algernon Keith-Falconer, 9th Earl of Kintore
- Governor of Tasmania – Robert Hamilton
- Governor of Victoria – John Hope, 1st Marquess of Linlithgow
- Governor of Western Australia – William C. F. Robinson

== Events ==
- 5 January - The 1891 Australian shearers' strike begins, which leads to the formation of the Australian Labor Party.
- 13 April - Howard Moffat founds newspaper Daily Commercial News, which runs for 108 years before merging with Lloyd's List Australia Weekly to form Lloyd's List DCN.

== Arts and literature ==
- Fire's on - Arthur Streeton

== Census ==
1891 census results
| NSW | Vic | Qld | SA | Tas | NT | WA | Australia |
|---|---|---|---|---|---|---|---|
| 1,123,954 | 1,139,840 | 393,718 | 315,533 | 146,667 | 4,898 | 49,782 | 3,174,392 |

== Sport ==
- Malvolio wins the Melbourne Cup

== Births ==
- 6 January – Ted McDonald, cricketer (died 1937)
- 22 January – Jack Lockett, oldest recorded Australian man (died 2002)
- 15 February – Roy Rene, comedian (died 1954)
- 28 March – May Mabel Adamson, school principal (died 1966)
- 9 April – Lesbia Harford, poet (died 1927)
- 30 April – Pat O'Hara Wood, tennis player (died 1961)
- 27 June – Mina Wylie, swimmer (died 1984)
- 26 September – William McKell, Premier of NSW and Governor General of Australia (died 1985)
- 18 October – Joe Abbott, politician (died 1965)
- 25 December (in New Zealand) – Clarrie Grimmett, cricketer (died 1980)

== Deaths ==
- 8 May – John Robertson (born 1816), Premier of New South Wales
- 27 October – Robert Allwood (born 1803), clergyman
- 29 October – Edward Hargraves (born 1816), gold prospector
- 7 December – Arthur Blyth (born 1823), Premier of South Australia
