= 1894 in Australia =

- Decades: 1870s; 1880s; 1890s; 1900s; 1910s
- See also: Other events of 1894; Timeline of Australian history

The following lists events that happened during 1894 in Australia.

== Incumbents ==
=== Premiers ===
- Premier of New South Wales - George Dibbs (until 2 August) then George Reid
- Premier of South Australia - Charles Kingston
- Premier of Queensland - Hugh Nelson
- Premier of Tasmania - Henry Dobson (until 14 April) then Edward Braddon
- Premier of Western Australia - John Forrest
- Premier of Victoria - James Patterson (until 27 September) then George Turner

=== Governors ===
- Governor of New South Wales – Robert Duff
- Governor of Queensland – Henry Wylie Norman
- Governor of South Australia – Algernon Keith-Falconer, 9th Earl of Kintore
- Governor of Tasmania – Jenico Preston, 14th Viscount Gormanston
- Governor of Victoria – John Hope, 1st Marquess of Linlithgow
- Governor of Western Australia – William C. F. Robinson

== Events ==
- January - A cyclone hits the north west of Western Australia, killing approximately 50 persons
- 28 June - A Colonial Conference, held in Ottawa, Ontario, Canada, resolves to lay a telegraph cable between Canada and Australia.
- 22 October - Martha Needle is hanged in Melbourne Gaol for the poisoning of her husband, and three children, in an attempt to obtain money from insurance policies.
- 10 November - Jandamarra, an Indigenous Australian of the Bunuba people, leads one of the few armed insurrections against Europeans.
- 18 December - South Australia is the first colony to legislate women equal franchise with men, taking effect in 1895.
- The Australian Workers' Union is formed from the joining of the Amalgamated Shearers' Union of Australasia and the General Labourers' Union.

== Arts and literature ==
- The novel Seven Little Australians is published by Ethel Turner

== Sport ==
- Patron wins the Melbourne Cup
- South Australia wins the Sheffield Shield

== Births ==
- 23 February – Harold Horder (died 1978), rugby league footballer
- 13 April – Arthur Fadden (died 1973), Prime Minister of Australia
- 30 April – H.V. Evatt (died 1965), politician
- 17 May – Raymond Brownell (died 1974), WW1 flying ace
- 14 August – Frank Burge (died 1958), rugby league footballer
- 25 August – Nick Winter (died 1955), athlete
- 20 December – Robert Menzies (died 1978), Prime Minister of Australia

== Deaths ==
- 17 February - John Alexander MacPherson (born 1833), Premier of Victoria
