= 1899 in Australia =

- Decades: 1870s; 1880s; 1890s; 1900s; 1910s
- See also: Other events of 1899; Timeline of Australian history

The following lists events that happened during 1899 in Australia.

== Incumbents ==
=== Governors of the Australian colonies ===
- Governor of New South Wales – Henry Brand, 2nd Viscount Hampden (until 5 March), then William Lygon, 7th Earl Beauchamp (from 18 May)
- Governor of Queensland – Charles Cochrane-Baillie, 2nd Baron Lamington
- Governor of South Australia – Sir Thomas Buxton, 3rd Baronet (until 29 March), then Hallam Tennyson, 2nd Baron Tennyson (from 10 April)
- Governor of Tasmania – Jenico Preston, 14th Viscount Gormanston
- Governor of Victoria – Thomas Brassey, 1st Earl Brassey
- Governor of Western Australia – Sir Gerard Smith

=== Premiers of the Australian colonies ===
- Premier of New South Wales – George Reid (until 13 September) then William Lyne
- Premier of Queensland – James Dickson (until 1 December), Anderson Dawson (until 7 December) then Robert Philp
- Premier of South Australia – Charles Kingston (until 1 December), Vaiben Louis Solomon (until 8 December) then Frederick Holder
- Premier of Tasmania – Edward Braddon (until 12 October) then Elliott Lewis
- Premier of Victoria – George Turner (until 5 December) then Allan McLean
- Premier of Western Australia – John Forrest

== Events ==
- 1 January – The Police Regulation Act 1898 is enacted in Tasmania, unifying several small regional police forces to form the Tasmanian Police Force.
- 22 January – Leaders of the six Australian colonies meet in Melbourne to discuss confederation.
- 4 March – Cyclone Mahina strikes Bathurst Bay in Queensland. Approximately 400 persons are killed, and the pearling fleet is sunk. A storm surge of up to 14 metres sweeps 5 kilometres inland.
- 24 April – The 1,280-ton barque Loch Sloy hits rocks off Kangaroo Island and sinks, killing 31 persons.
- 27 April – The Apostolic Church of Queensland receives formal recognition as a religious denomination.
- 20 June – Voters in New South Wales overwhelmingly approve a resolution to join the proposed Federation of Australia.
- 24 June – The Australia national rugby union team plays its first game, a 13-3 loss to at team representing Great Britain.
- 16 September – In the 1899 VFL Grand Final championship game of the Victorian Football League, defending champions Fitzroy retain the title over South Melbourne, 27 to 26. It is the second grand final ever contested in the league.
- 17 September – The career of bandit John Francis Peggotty ends in the town of Meningie, South Australia, when Peggotty's intended victim shoots both the bandit and the ostrich. The body of the ostrich is found, but Peggotty is never seen again.
- 8 December – An electric tram service commences in Sydney, along George Street from the railway to Circular Quay.
- Colonial soldiers leave to fight in the Second Boer War.

== Arts and literature ==
Boona Schottische 1899 by Christian Hellema
MIDI version

- 8 October – The word "wowser" is first used by John Norton, editor of the Melbourne Truth newspaper.
- George Washington Lambert wins the Wynne Prize for landscape painting or figure sculpture for his landscape Across the Blacksoil Plains
- Dot and the Kangaroo, a children's book by Ethel Pedley, is published.
- On Our Selection by Steele Rudd is published.

== Sport ==
- Merriwee wins the Melbourne Cup
- Victoria wins the Sheffield Shield

== Births ==
- 7 January – John Collins, Chief of Naval Staff and High Commissioner to New Zealand (died 1989)
- 17 January – Nevil Shute, writer (died 1960)
- 21 January – Ernestine Hill, travel writer (died 1972)
- 22 February – Ian Clunies Ross, scientist (died 1959)
- 7 March – Eddie Ward, politician (died 1963)
- 9 August – P. L. Travers, novelist (Mary Poppins) (died 1996 in The United Kingdom)
- 24 September – William Dobell, artist, sculptor and painter (died 1970)
- 21 October – Herb Steinohrt, rugby league footballer (died 1985)
- 11 December – Joan Stevenson Abbott, World War II army hospital matron (died 1975)
- 14 December – Frank McMillan, rugby league footballer and coach (died 1966)

=== Date unknown ===
- Olga Agnew, child actress (died 1987)

== Deaths ==
- 21 February – George Bowen (born 1821), Governor of Queensland
- 13 April – James Service (born 1823), former Premier of Victoria
- 25 September – Elizabeth Tripp (born 1809), educator
