= Allnutt =

Allnutt is a surname. Notable people with the surname include:

- Albert Allnutt (1892–1963), Australian politician
- Gillian Allnutt (born 1949), English poet
- John Allnutt (1773–1863), British wine merchant and art collector
- Marion Ellen Lea Allnutt (1896–1980), welfare worker
- Wendy Allnutt (born 1946), English stage and screen actress
- Yari Allnutt (born 1970), American soccer player

== See also ==
- Mark Alnutt, director of athletics for the University at Buffalo
