= 1892 in Australia =

- Decades: 1870s; 1880s; 1890s; 1900s; 1910s
- See also: Other events of 1892; Timeline of Australian history

The following lists events that happened during 1892 in Australia.

== Incumbents ==
=== Premiers ===
- Premier of New South Wales – George Dibbs
- Premier of South Australia – Thomas Playford II (until 21 June), Frederick Holder (until 15 October), then John Downer
- Premier of Queensland – Samuel Griffith
- Premier of Tasmania – Philip Fysh (until 17 August) then Henry Dobson
- Premier of Western Australia – John Forrest
- Premier of Victoria – James Munro (until 16 February), then William Shiels

=== Governors ===
- Governor of New South Wales – Victor Child Villiers, 7th Earl of Jersey
- Governor of Queensland – Henry Wylie Norman
- Governor of South Australia – Algernon Keith-Falconer, 9th Earl of Kintore
- Governor of Tasmania – Robert Hamilton until 30 November, vacant thereafter
- Governor of Victoria – John Hope, 1st Marquess of Linlithgow
- Governor of Western Australia – William C. F. Robinson

== Events ==
- 20 April – Victoria holds a general election.
- 23 May – Frederick Deeming hanged at Melbourne Gaol having been unsuccessfully defended by the lawyer Alfred Deakin. Deeming was accused of committing a series of crimes on three continents – theft, perjury, fraud, bigamy and murder; he used at least 20 aliases.
- 10 October – Jackie Howe shears a total of 321 sheep in 7 hours and 40 minutes at Blackall, Queensland, a record for hand shears that still stands.
- 1 January – Physical Culture (Physie) started in Australia.

== Sport ==
- 5 October – the Australian Cricket Council announces an intercolonial cricket competition to be known as the Sheffield Shield.
- Glenloth wins the Melbourne Cup
- Collingwood Football Club was founded

== Births ==
- 13 April – Gladys Moncrieff (died 1976), singer
- 20 April – Grace Cossington Smith, (died 1984), artist
- 6 July – John Simpson Kirkpatrick (died 1915), World War I ANZAC known as "the man with the donkey"
- 7 August – Sir Arthur Coles (died 1982), businessman and philanthropist
- 24 November – Sir Daniel McVey (died 1972), public servant
- 8 December – Bert Hinkler (died 1933), aviator

== Deaths ==
- 10 May – Barcroft Boake (born 1866), poet
- 7 November – John Morphett (born 1809), explorer, settler and politician
