= Utz (name) =

Utz is a name. Notable people with the name include:

== Surname ==
- Carolyn Utz (1913-2005), American bassist, educator and conductor
- David Utz (1923–2011), American surgeon
- Harley (1898-2001) and Sylvia Utz (1899-2009), American couple married for 83 years
- Lois Utz (1932–86), American children's literature author
- Richard Utz (born 1961), scholar of medieval studies
- Stanley Frederick Utz (1898–1974), Australian businessman and politician
- Willibald Utz (1893–1954), German officer in the World War II Wehrmacht (Generalleutnant)
- Lorna Utz, an Australian tennis player

== Given name ==
- Utz Chwalla (born 1942), Austrian bobsledder
- Utz Claassen (born 1963), German manager, entrepreneur and author
- Utz Rothe (born 1941), Austrian painter and graphic artist

== Nickname ==
- Irwin Uteritz, (1899–1963), American athlete and coach who changed his surname to Utz in 1952 - it having been his nickname
- Wilhelm "Utz" Utermann (1912–1991), German writer and film producer
