= 1901 in Australia =

- Decades: 1880s; 1890s; 1900s; 1910s; 1920s
- See also: Other events of 1901; Timeline of Australian history

The following lists events that happened during 1901 in Australia.

1901 in Australia
- Monarch: Victoria, then Edward VII
- Governor-General: Lord Hopetoun
- Prime minister: Edmund Barton
- Population: 3,788,123
- Elections: Federal, WA, NSW

== Incumbents ==
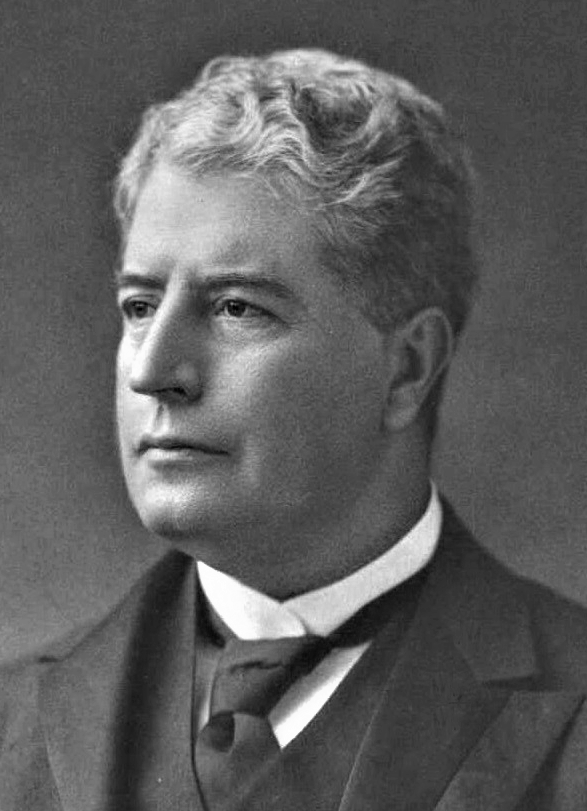
Edmund Barton

- Monarch – Victoria (until 22 January), then Edward VII
- Governor-General – Lord Hopetoun
- Prime Minister – Edmund Barton (from 1 January)
  - Opposition Leader – George Reid (from 19 May)

=== State leaders ===
- Premier of New South Wales – William Lyne (until 27 March), then John See
  - Opposition Leader – Charles Lee (from 23 March)
- Premier of Queensland – Robert Philp
  - Opposition Leader – Anderson Dawson (until 16 July), then Billy Browne
- Premier of South Australia – Frederick Holder (until 15 May), then John Jenkins
  - Opposition Leader – Vaiben Louis Solomon, then Robert Homburg
- Premier of Tasmania – Elliott Lewis
  - Opposition Leader – Sir Edward Braddon (until March), then Sir Thomas Reibey (until October), then William Propsting
- Premier of Victoria – Sir George Turner (until 12 February), then Alexander Peacock
- Premier of Western Australia – Sir John Forrest (until 15 February), then George Throssell (until 27 May), then George Leake (until 21 November), then Alf Morgans (until 23 December), then George Leake

=== Governors and administrators ===
- Governor of New South Wales – The Earl Beauchamp (until 30 April)
- Governor of Queensland – Lord Lamington (until 19 December)
- Governor of South Australia – Lord Tennyson
- Governor of Tasmania – Sir Arthur Havelock (from 8 November)
- Governor of Victoria – Sir George Clarke (from 10 December)
- Governor of Western Australia – Baron Wetlock (from 1 May)
- Government Resident of the Northern Territory – Charles Dashwood

== Events ==
- 1 January – The Constitution of Australia comes into force, as the federation of Australia is complete. John Hope, 7th Earl of Hopetoun appoints Edmund Barton as the first Prime Minister following the Hopetoun blunder of 1900. Hopetoun had himself been commissioned as the first Governor-General of Australia by Queen Victoria in letters patent dated 29 October 1900 prior to the Constitution coming into force.
- 1 March – Following federation naval and military forces of the States are transferred to Commonwealth control.
- 29 March – The first federal election is held to elect the first members of the House of Representatives and the first members of the Senate.
- 31 March – A national census is held, which indicates the population of Australia is 3,773,801 (excluding Indigenous Australians).
- 9 May – The Parliament of Australia is opened in the Royal Exhibition Building, Melbourne.
- 22 May – The foundation stone for St John's Cathedral, Brisbane, is laid by The Duke of Cornwall and York (later George V). the church celebrated 100 years of construction in 2006 and is the only gothic-style stone building under construction anywhere in the world.
- 3 September – The Flag of Australia and Australian Red Ensign are adopted by the Government of Australia as official flags, following a national design competition.
- 21 December – Construction begins on the rabbit-proof fence.
- 23 December – The Immigration Restriction Act 1901 comes into force, instituting the White Australia Policy.
- 31 December – The Roman Catholic Platform (now known as Cemetery Station No. 2) opens in Sydney, Australia's Rookwood Cemetery.

== Sport ==
- 3 January – Victoria wins the Sheffield Shield.
- 28 September – Essendon beats Collingwood 6.7 (43) to 2.4 (16) in the 1901 VFL grand final
- 5 November – Revenue wins the Melbourne Cup.

== Births ==
- 27 March – Kenneth Slessor, poet, journalist and war correspondent (d. 1971)
- 1 June – Tom Gorman, rugby league footballer (d. 1978)
- 25 September – Gordon Coventry, Australian rules footballer (Collingwood) (d. 1968)

== Deaths ==
- 10 January – Sir James Dickson, 13th Premier of Queensland (born in the United Kingdom) (b. 1832)
- 20 June – Alexander Forrest, Western Australian politician and explorer (b. 1849)
- 8 August – William Henry Groom, Queensland politician and newspaper proprietor (born in the United Kingdom) (b. 1833)
- 31 October – Robert Abbott, New South Wales politician (born in Ireland) (b. 1830)
- 30 November – Edward John Eyre, explorer (born and died in the United Kingdom) (b. 1815)

== See also ==
- 1900 in Australia
- other events of 1901
- 1902 in Australia
- Timeline of Australian history
