= 1900 in Australia =

- Decades: 1880s; 1890s; 1900s; 1910s; 1920s
- See also: Other events of 1900; Timeline of Australian history

The following lists events that happened during 1900 in Australia.

== Incumbents ==
- Monarch – Queen Victoria
- Governor-General – John Hope, 7th Earl of Hopetoun (from 29 October 1900)

Note: Legislation enabling the federation of Australia had been passed in the colonies and the United Kingdom, but proclamation of the Commonwealth of Australia was not set to occur until 1 January 1901. Although this meant that there was no Prime Minister of Australia in 1900, the role of Governor-General was established prior to proclamation through letters patent.

=== Governors of the Australian colonies ===
- Governor of New South Wales – William Lygon, 7th Earl Beauchamp
- Governor of Queensland – Charles Cochrane-Baillie, 2nd Baron Lamington
- Governor of South Australia – Hallam Tennyson, 2nd Baron Tennyson
- Governor of Tasmania – Jenico Preston, 14th Viscount Gormanston (until 14 August)
- Governor of Victoria – Thomas Brassey, 1st Earl Brassey (until 31 March)
- Premier of New South Wales – William Lyne
- Premier of South Australia – Frederick Holder
- Premier of Queensland – Robert Philp
- Premier of Tasmania – Elliott Lewis
- Premier of Western Australia – John Forrest
- Premier of Victoria – Allan McLean (until 19 November), then George Turner

== Events ==
- 3 January – Electric lighting is installed on Adelaide streets.
- 25 January – State Labour politicians meet in Sydney to formally found the federal Labour party.
- 25 March – The S.S. Glenelg is wrecked off the Victorian coast, resulting in 31 deaths.
- March to May – Record rainfall and flooding affect the Pilbara and Gascoyne regions of Western Australia
- 9 May – The Sierra Nevada is wrecked off Portsea, Victoria; 23 lives are lost.
- 2 July – Snow falls to extremely low levels in New South Wales, being recorded as low as Forbes.
- 5 July – The Commonwealth of Australia Constitution Act (UK) is passed.
- 24 July – Neville Howse rescues a fallen ally under heavy fire during the Second Boer War, becoming the first Australian recipient of the Victoria Cross.
- 8 August – The first Australian contingents of naval volunteers set sail for China to assist British and international troops during the Boxer Rebellion.
- 17 October – Natural gas is found at Roma in Queensland
- 27 October – Notorious murderer Jimmy Governor is apprehended near Wingham, New South Wales.
- 15 December – Upon his arrival in Australia, the first Governor-General, Lord Hopetoun, commits the so-called Hopetoun Blunder.

== Film ==
- 14 September – The film Soldiers of the Cross is shown in Melbourne, one of the first films shown in Australia. (IMDb entry)

== Births ==
- 8 January – Merlyn Myer, Australian philanthropist (died 1982)
- 25 January – Harold Raggatt, public servant (died 1968)
- 12 February – Sir Ragnar Garrett, army officer (died 1977)
- 7 March – Sir Lorimer Dods, medical pioneer (died 1981)
- 29 March – John McEwen, caretaker Prime Minister (1967–1968) (died 1980)
- 26 April – Alice Berry, social activist (died 1978)
- 29 April – Amelia Best, politician (died 1979)
- 4 July – Belinda Dann, centenarian, longest-lived member of the Stolen Generation (died 2007).
- 29 July – Mary V. Austin, community worker and political activist (died 1986)
- 1 August – Otto Nothling, rugby union and cricket player (died 1965)
- 16 August – Ida Browne, geologist and palaeontologist (died 1976)
- 9 October – Frank O'Grady, Australian public servant (d. 1981)
- 19 October – Bill Ponsford, cricketer (died 1991)
- 20 October – Jack Lindsay, writer (died 1990)
- 3 December
  - Karna Maria Birmingham, artist, illustrator and print maker (died 1987)
  - Albert Hawke, Premier of Western Australia (1953–1959) (died 1989)
- 10 December – Eric Costa, politician (died 1976)

== Deaths ==
- 17 July – Thomas McIlwraith, former Queensland premier (born 1835)
- 22 August – Dagmar Berne, medical doctor and the first female student to study medicine in Australia (born 1866)
- 17 November – John Ferris, Australian cricketer (born 1867)

== Population ==
- 3,765,339

== See also ==
- List of Australian films before 1910
