= 1890 in Australia =

- Decades: 1870s; 1880s; 1890s; 1900s; 1910s
- See also: Other events of 1890; Timeline of Australian history

The following lists events that happened during 1890 in Australia.

== Incumbents ==
=== Premiers ===
- Premier of New South Wales – Henry Parkes
- Premier of South Australia – John Cockburn until 19 August, then Thomas Playford II
- Premier of Queensland – Boyd Dunlop Morehead until 12 August, then Samuel Griffith
- Premier of Tasmania – Philip Fysh
- Premier of Western Australia – established from 29 December, John Forrest
- Premier of Victoria – Duncan Gillies until 5 November, then James Munro

=== Governors ===
- Governor of New South Wales – Victor Child Villiers, 7th Earl of Jersey
- Governor of Queensland – Henry Wylie Norman
- Governor of South Australia – Algernon Keith-Falconer, 9th Earl of Kintore
- Governor of Tasmania – Robert Hamilton
- Governor of Victoria – John Hope, 1st Marquess of Linlithgow
- Governor of Western Australia – William C. F. Robinson

== Events ==
- 1 January – The University of Tasmania opens
- 28 February – The steamship RMS Quetta sinks off Cape York Peninsula, killing 133
- 2 October – Fire destroys buildings between Castlereagh, Moore and Pitt Streets valued at £750,000 sterling
- 29 December – Sir John Forrest becomes the Premier of Western Australia and the first Premier in Australia.

== Arts and literature ==
- 26 April – Banjo Paterson's The Man from Snowy River is published.
- May – Tom Roberts' Shearing the Rams is first exhibited
- Verse by Adam Lindsay Gordon (1830-1870) set to music by Australian musician Theodore Tourrier (1846-1929)

== Sport ==
- 31 May – The first Australian Championships in Athletics are held under the name Inter Colonial Meet. The men's competition is staged at the Moore Park in Sydney.
- November – Carbine wins the Melbourne Cup

== Births ==
- 2 March – Sir Malcolm Barclay-Harvey, Governor of South Australia 1939–1944 (died 1969)
- 9 March - Rupert Balfe, Australian rules footballer and soldier (died 1915)
- 10 March – Albert Ogilvie, Premier of Tasmania (died 1939)
- 19 April – Edgar Towner, soldier, Victoria Cross recipient (died 1972)
- 10 July – Leo Rush, Australian rules footballer (died 1983)
- 18 July – Frank Forde, 15th Prime Minister of Australia (died 1983)
- 26 August – Tommy Andrews, cricketer (died 1970)
- 29 August – Richard Gardiner Casey, Governor General of Australia (died 1976)
- 9 September – Hilda Abbott, Red Cross leader and wife of the administrator of the Northern Territory (died 1984)
- 10 September – Robert Heffron, Premier of New South Wales (died 1978)
- 31 December – Daryl Lindsay, artist (died 1976)

== Deaths ==
- 9 November - James Boag I, brewer (born 1822)
