= Francis Norman =

English lieutenant-general (1830–1901)

Lieutenant-General Sir Francis Norman KCB
- Born: 25 April 1830; London, England
- Died: 25 June 1901 (aged 71) Dulwich, England
- Buried: West Norwood Cemetery
- Allegiance: East India Company; British India
- Branch: Bengal Army
- Service years: 1848–1891
- Rank: Lieutenant-General
- Commands: 24th Regiment of Bengal Native Infantry
- Conflicts: Indian Rebellion; Ambela Campaign; Bhutan Campaign; Hazara Campaign; Second Anglo-Afghan War; Third Anglo-Burmese War
- Awards: Indian Mutiny Medal; India General Service Medal (5 clasps); Mentioned in Despatches (4); Afghanistan Medal (1 clasp); Kabul to Kandahar Star; Companion of the Order of the Bath; Knight Commander of the Order of the Bath

Lieutenant-General Sir Francis Booth Norman (25 April 1830 – 25 June 1901) was an English officer of the Bengal Army, who led Bengal Native Infantry troops during the Indian Rebellion of 1857, the Second Anglo-Afghan War, and a number of small conflicts on the frontiers of British India.

== Career ==
Francis Norman was the younger brother of Sir Henry Wylie Norman, and was born on 25 April 1830 in London. He entered Addiscombe, and obtained his commission in the Bengal Army on 8 December 1848. After his regiment participated in the Mutiny of 1857, he was attached to the 14th (Ferozepore Sikh) Regiment, and he remained at Ferozepore during subsequent operations. He received the Indian Mutiny Medal for his service during the rebellion.

In 1863, Norman took part in the Ambela Campaign, and was present at the storming of the Conical Hill and at the destruction of Laloo. He was mentioned in despatches, and added the India General Service Medal with clasp to the Mutiny Medal. In the three following years he was engaged during the Bhutan Campaign in the capture of Dewangiri and of the stockades in the Gurugaon Pass, serving as assistant quartermaster-general and receiving the "Bhootan" clasp and the brevet rank of major. In 1868, he took part in the Hazara Campaign as second-in-command of the 24th (Punjab) Regiment, again receiving the clasp.

After an interval of ten years, the Second Anglo-Afghan War (1878–80) brought him fresh opportunities of distinction. He commanded the 24th Regiment in the Bazar Valley and the defence of Jagdallak, marching with General Roberts's force from Kabul to Kandahar and taking part in the Battle of Kandahar on 1 September 1880. Mentioned in several despatches, he received the Afghanistan Medal with clasp "Kandahar", the bronze star, a Companionship of the Order of the Bath, and brevet colonelcy. During the Third Anglo-Burmese War of 1885, he commanded the Bengal Army brigade of the Upper Burma field force, assisting in the occupation of Mandalay and Bhamo. He was thanked by the government of British India and promoted to be Knight Commander of the Bath. He attained the rank of major-general on 1 September 1889. He was later promoted on the retired list.

== Personal life ==
Francis Norman left India in 1891. He died on 25 June 1901 at Dulwich, and was buried in West Norwood Cemetery. He was twice married: in 1852 to Eliza Ellen, daughter of lieutenant Nisbett, Bengal Army, who died at Rawal Pindi in 1870; and in March 1892 to Caroline Matilda, daughter of the Rev. W. W. Cazalet and widow of Major E. F. J. Rennick, Bengal Staff Corps, who survived him. He left three sons and three daughters, one of the latter, Edith, being the wife of Sir Louis W. Dane, lieutenant-governor of the Punjab.
