= 1888 in Australia =

- Decades: 1860s; 1870s; 1880s; 1890s; 1900s
- See also: Other events of 1888; Timeline of Australian history

The following lists events that happened during 1888 in Australia.

== Incumbents ==
- Monarch - Victoria

=== Premiers ===
- Premier of New South Wales – Henry Parkes
- Premier of Queensland – Samuel Griffith (until 13 June), then Thomas McIlwraith (until 30 November), then Boyd Dunlop Morehead
- Premier of South Australia – Thomas Playford II
- Premier of Tasmania – Philip Fysh
- Premier of Victoria – Duncan Gillies

=== Governors ===
- Governor of New South Wales – Lord Carrington
- Governor of Queensland – Sir Anthony Musgrave (until 9 October)
- Governor of South Australia – Sir William Robinson
- Governor of Tasmania – Sir Robert Hamilton
- Governor of Victoria – Lord Loch
- Governor of Western Australia – Sir Frederick Broome

== Events ==
- 27 January – Centennial Park is opened in Sydney.
- 30 January – The Presbyterian Church of New South Wales establishes its first school, the Presbyterian Ladies' College, Sydney.
- 1 July – "The Dawn: A Journal for Australian Women" first published by Louisa Lawson, in Sydney.
- 1 August – The Melbourne Centennial Exhibition is opened.
- 4 October – Princes Bridge, Melbourne is opened.
- 9 October – Launceston, Tasmania is proclaimed a city.
- 25 October – The captain of the HMQS Gayundah, Henry Townley Wright, refuses to relinquish his command after being ordered to do so by the Queensland government. The Colonial Secretary orders Wright be dismissed from the Queensland Maritime Defence Force, and has him removed from the ship by Queensland Police.

=== Undated ===
- Excavation begins on the water supply tunnels beneath Fremantle Prison, in Western Australia.
- Australia’s 100th Birthday not there are colonies Australia is not a country until 1901

== Arts and literature ==
- Angus & Robertson publish their first book, A Crown of Wattle, a collection of poetry by H. Peden Steel

== Sport ==
- 6 November – Mentor wins the Melbourne Cup.

== Births ==
- 12 January – Leslie Gordon Chandler, ornithologist (died 1980)
- 9 June – Ida Rentoul Outhwaite, illustrator (died 1960)
- 29 June – Squizzy Taylor, Melbourne gangster (died 1927)
- 8 August – Harold Page, military officer (died 1942)
- 28 August – Evadne Price, writer, actress and astrologer (died 1985)
- 18 September – Herb Gilbert, national rugby league team captain (died 1972)
- 31 October – Hubert Wilkins, polar explorer (died 1958)
- 14 December – Harold Hardwick, freestyle swimmer (died 1959)

== Deaths ==
- 21 February – William Weston (born 1804), Premier of Tasmania (1857)
- 30 May – Louis Buvelot (born 1814), painter
- 15 August – Robert Seddon (born 1860), British rugby union player
- 9 October – Anthony Musgrave (born 1828), Governor of South Australia (1873–1877) and Queensland (1883–1888)
- 28 October – William Bede Dalley, Australia's first member of the Privy Council.
