= 1902 in Australia =

- Decades: 1880s; 1890s; 1900s; 1910s; 1920s
- See also: Other events of 1902; Timeline of Australian history

The following lists events that happened during 1902 in Australia.

1902 in Australia
- Monarch: Edward VII
- Governor-General: John Hope, 7th Earl of Hopetoun
- Prime minister: Edmund Barton
- Population: 3,845,265
- Elections: South Australia, Victoria, Queensland

In 1902 women were finally allowed to vote and stand in federal elections.

== Incumbents ==
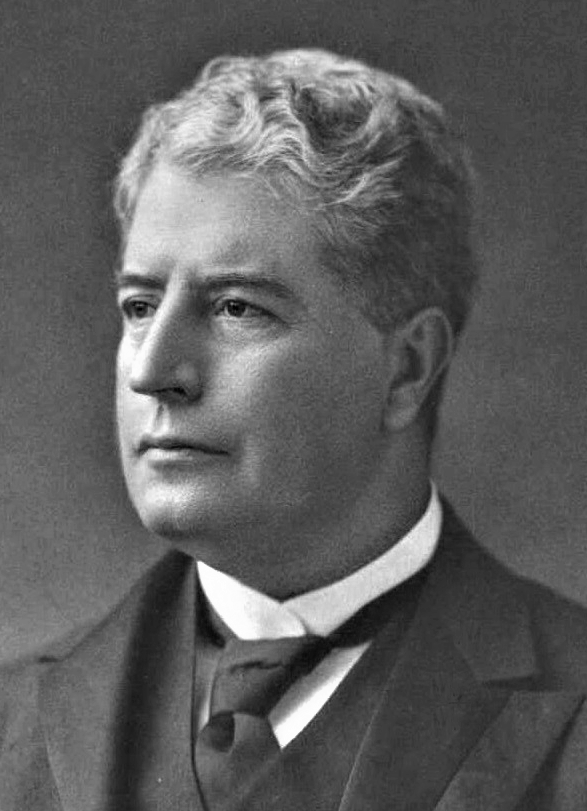
Edmund Barton

- Monarch – Edward VII
- Governor-General – John Hope, 7th Earl of Hopetoun
- Prime Minister – Edmund Barton

=== State premiers ===
- Premier of New South Wales – John See
- Premier of South Australia – John Jenkins
- Premier of Queensland – Robert Philp
- Premier of Tasmania – Elliott Lewis
- Premier of Western Australia – George Leake (until 1 July), then Walter James
- Premier of Victoria – Alexander Peacock (until 10 June), then William Irvine

=== State governors ===
- Governor of New South Wales – Admiral Harry Rawson (from 27 May)
- Governor of South Australia – Hallam Tennyson, 2nd Baron Tennyson (until 17 July)
- Governor of Queensland – Major General Sir Herbert Chermside (from 24 March)
- Governor of Tasmania – Captain Sir Arthur Havelock
- Governor of Western Australia – Sir Arthur Lawley (until 14 August)
- Governor of Victoria – Sir George Clarke

== Events ==
- 7 February – The Waterside Workers Federation is formed.
- April – Averaged over Australia, the driest month on record with only 3.74 millimetres (0.15 in). Over half the continent was absolutely rainless and less than 3 percent outside Tasmania had more than 10 millimetres (0.39 in).
- 5 May – The Commonwealth Public Service Act creates Australia's Public Service.
- 31 May – The Second Boer War, in which Australia is involved, ends.
- 12 June – The Commonwealth Franchise Act granted most Australian women the right to vote and stand in federal elections.
- 31 July – A coal gas explosion kills 96 in the Mount Kembla mining disaster
- 1 August – New Idea magazine is first published.
- 3 November – Postmaster-General James Drake opens a submarine telegraph cable from Southport, Queensland to Vancouver, British Columbia, Canada, completing a British Empire communications line.
- 18 December – The mayors of Sydney and Melbourne are conferred the title of Lord Mayor
- 26 December – Brisbane is declared a city.
- 26 December – Ada Evans becomes the first female law graduate in Australia.
- As a culmination of the Federation Drought, this was by raw totals the driest calendar year averaged over Australia since 1890 with only 314.46 millimetres (12.38 in) (though by area-averaged mean decile it was only eleventh driest).

=== Unknown dates ===
- The world's first successful pyritic smelting takes place at Mount Lyell, Tasmania

== Arts and literature ==
- 17 September – Opera singer Nellie Melba arrives in Brisbane for her first Australian tour after 16 years in Europe.
- James White wins the Wynne Prize with his bronze sculpture In Defence of the Flat

== Sport ==
- 27 September – Collingwood wins the 1902 VFL grand final, defeating Essendon 9.6 (60) to 3.9 (27) at the first final to be held at the Melbourne Cricket Ground before a record crowd of 35,000.
- 11 November – The Victory wins the Melbourne Cup
- New South Wales wins the Sheffield Shield

== Births ==
- 15 January – Dan Dempsey, rugby league footballer (d. 1960)
- 25 February – Vince Gair, politician (d. 1980)
- 2 May – Alan Marshall, writer (d. 1984)
- 22 May – Leslie Herron, Chief Justice of NSW (d. 1973)
- 12 July – Vic Armbruster, rugby league footballer (d. 1984)
- 17 July – Christina Stead, writer (d. 1983)
- 28 July – Albert Namatjira, painter (d. 1959)

== Deaths ==
- 27 February – Breaker Morant, convicted military officer, bush poet and drover (born in the United Kingdom and died in South Africa) (b. 1864)
- 6 March – Frederick William Piesse, Tasmanian politician (b. 1848)
- 24 June – George Leake, 3rd Premier of Western Australia (b. 1856)

== See also ==
- 1902
- 1900–1909
