= Matagarup Refugee Camp =

Political protest in Perth, Western Australia

Coordinates: 31.9641°S 115.8845°E

Matagarup Refugee Camp was a political protest in 2015 against the Government of Western Australia's threat to close many Aboriginal remote communities and safe space for Noongar homeless people. Matagarup is the Noongar name for Heirisson Island which is situated in East Perth.

== History ==
On 1 March 2015 more than 100 Aboriginal protesters and homeless people established a "refugee protest" camp at Heirisson Island in response to the threat by the Government of Western Australia of forced closures of small remote communities. However, the City of Perth refused the protesters camping, protesting and sheltering homeless on Heirisson Island, and raided the camp nine times between March and August 2015, usually escorted by a large police presence, confiscating tents and belongings. During some of the raids, police were accused of "excessive use of force". Some of the raids led to arrests by police, issuing of move-on notices and in court appearances but the campers and the homeless continued to return.

On each occasion the camp re-established itself, led by Noongar elder, Bella Bropho, who began camping on the island on 1 March 2015. Bropho said that the homeless camp had to be fought for "because if this fails, I don't know where the people are going to go to". While the camp was seen as both illegal and unwanted by some, it claimed to be accepted by some workers with the homeless, particularly Jennifer Kaeshagen of the First Nations Homelessness Project and director of HAND Tanya Cairns, and it attracted international attention and support.

The protests resulted in the end of the local Parkrun on Heirisson Island, after participants were repeatedly threatened by protesters.

On 31 May 2015, a concert was held on Heirisson Island. City of Perth chief executive officer Gary Stevenson stated "authorities were compelled to act due to the recent amount of activity on the island" and that "facilities are not designed to cope with large groups of people continuously congregating at Heirisson Island".

Matagarup elevated media attention to Perth's increasing homelessness, and advocates for the homeless such as Kaeshagen and Gerry Georgatos established campaigns for Homeless Friendly Precincts that expanded nationally, and even secured the support of the City of Perth. Georgatos said that homelessness on the streets includes significant numbers of large families "of 5, 6, 7, 8, and 9 children".

After an August 2015 raid, the City of Perth officially referred to their efforts as "de-camping", but desisted from confiscating tents. The camp grew and continued to shelter the homeless. Advocates alongside the campers led by Bella Bropho brought the right of the homeless to camp at Heirisson Island before various tribunals, mediation and courts, each time unsuccessfully.

Kaeshagen and Cairns coordinated Christmas for the homeless camp at Heirisson on 22 December 2015 once again without securing permits from the City of Perth.

The camp was removed in April 2016.
