= May Mabel Adamson =

Australian educator and headmistress

- Born: 28 March 1891; Cooktown, Queensland
- Died: 3 October 1966 (aged 75); Wahroonga, Sydney
- Education: University of Queensland
- Occupation: Principal
- Relatives: Amy Hannah Adamson (sister)

May Mabel Adamson (1891–1966) was an Australian educator. She was the principal of the Brisbane Central Technical College's Domestic Science High School from October 1953 to 30 June 1957.

== Biography ==
Adamson was born in Cooktown, Queensland as one of six children of Reverend John Adamson and his wife Caroline, and was educated in Maryborough Girls' Grammar School. Her younger sister Amy led a similar career path, also ultimately becoming a headmistress of the Maryborough State High and Intermediate School for Girls.

She worked as an assistant on probation at Maryborough East State School (later renamed Granville State School), then taught at a series of schools until she returned in to Brisbane to teach at Milton in 1932. From 1927 she studied part-time whilst working and graduated with a Bachelor of Arts from the University of Queensland in 1940. In 1936 she started at the Central Technical College's Domestic Science High School and in October 1953 she was appointed principal. She retired on 30 June 1957, and moved to Sydney.

Adamson died on 3 October 1966, and was cremated in Wahroonga, Sydney.
