= Lucy Godiva Woodcock =

Pacifist, schoolteacher, trade union official and women's activist. (1889–1968)

Lucy Godiva Woodcock (23 February 1889 – 29 February 1968) was an Australian pacifist, schoolteacher, trade union official and women's activist. Woodcock was born in Granville, Sydney, New South Wales and died in Ashfield, Sydney, New South Wales.

While teaching in Sydney, she completed a BA (1922) and BEc (1924) at the University of Sydney. She was elected to the senate of the university in 1942. Headmistress of Erskineville Girls' School, Woodcock was senior vice-president of the Teachers' Federation of New South Wales in the 1940s and also on the Child Welfare Advisory Council.

== See also ==
- Muriel Agnes Heagney
- Samuel Phineas (Sam) Lewis
