= Margaret Theadora Allan =

Australian community worker (1889–1968)

Margaret Theadora Allan BEM
- Born: 2 June 1889; Charters Towers, Queensland, Australia
- Died: 14 December 1968 (aged 79); St Vincent's Hospital, Darlinghurst, New South Wales, Australia
- Occupation: Community Worker

Margaret Theadora Allan BEM (1889–1968) was a Community Worker and organizing secretary for the Travellers' Aid Society of New South Wales.

Allan was the third child of a Presbyterian minister, the Rev. Alexander McWatt Allan, and his wife, Margaret Jane Allan, and was born in a manse in Charters Towers, Queensland on 2 June 1889. Her father was transferred to New South Wales where, after ministering to several pastorates, he settled in Tweed Heads in 1908 before he was killed in an accident.

Allan was first employed as a secretary for the Young Women's Christian Association (YWCA) and in 1940, after the Sydney branch of the YWCA separated into the Travellers' Aid Society of New South Wales (T.A.S.) and relocated to a room in Central railway station, became its organizing secretary. The T.A.S. initially gave aid and protection to women and children, but later encompassed all travelers irrespective of gender or age. She was an enthusiastic and energetic organizer of the T.A.S. and according to the Australian Dictionary of Biography "[by] 1966 the T.A.S. provided accommodation for a total of 1762 women and children at the Lodge in Elizabeth Street (which it had purchased in 1952) [and by 1968] the society had a staff of ten to assist 33,073 travellers". She was awarded the British Empire Medal in January 1968 for services to the community.

Allan later lived in North Sydney and was a member of the Daughters of the Manse Association, which was set up in 1926 by the Presbyterian church as an auxiliary body to assist with community work. She died on 14 December 1968 at St Vincent's Hospital, Darlinghurst and was cremated.
