= Amy Hannah Adamson =

Australian educator (1893–1963)

- Born: 4 August 1893; Cooktown, Queensland, Australia
- Died: 19 June 1963 (aged 69); Clayfield, Queensland, Australia
- Education: University of Queensland
- Occupation: Principal
- Relatives: May Mabel Adamson (sister)

Amy Hannah Adamson (1893–1963) was an Australian educator, the principal of Maryborough State High and Intermediate School (Girls) from 7 July 1949, till 31 December 1959. Through her career in Queensland Education, she considered herself the "problem child of the Department" as she advocated for the promotion of women in the then Department of Public Instruction.

== Biography ==
Adamson was born in Cooktown, Queensland as one of six children of Reverend John Adamson and his wife Caroline, and was educated at Maryborough Girls' Grammar School. Her older sister May led a similar career path, also ultimately becoming a headmistress of the Queensland Domestic Science High School.

She worked as an assistant teacher at Eagle Junction State School, then attended University of Queensland to complete a Bachelor of Arts. After completing her degree she worked in a series of schools, before becoming the officer-in-charge of the commercial section of the Queensland Juvenile Employment Bureau in 1943. She later unsuccessfully applied for the role of post of senior instructor in the Department of Public Instruction, but appealed against the appointment of a male colleague and won. She later became assistant headmistress for Maryborough State High and Intermediate School for Girls and became headmistress from 7 July 1949. She retired on 31 December 1959.

Adamson died of myocardial infarction on 19 June 1963 at Clayfield, Brisbane, and was cremated.
