= 24th Regiment of Bengal Native Infantry =

== Chronology ==
- 1779 raised at Chunar by Captain William Davis
- 1780? ranked as 34th Battalion of Bengal Native Infantry
- 1781 became the 27th Regiment of Bengal Native Infantry
- 1784 became the 30th Battalion of Bengal Native Infantry
- 1786 became the 30th Battalion of Bengal Native Infantry
- 1796 became the 2nd Battalion 8th Regiment of Bengal Native Infantry
- 1824 became the 24th Regiment of Bengal Native Infantry
- 1857 disarmed at Peshawar 22 May

In 1861, after the mutiny, the title was given to the 8th Regiment of Punjab Infantry which later became the 24th Regiment of Punjab Infantry.
