= Stanley Frederick Utz =

Australian businessman

- Born: May 17, 1898
- Died: May 6, 1974 (aged 75)
- Citizenship: Australian
- Occupation: Businessman
- Spouse: Janet Cuthbertson Saxton

Stanley Frederick Utz (17 May 1898 - 6 May 1974) was an Australian businessman and official of the Australian Liberal Party. Hailing from Sydney with German ancestry, Utz served in the Australian Imperial Force for the closing months of the First World War before being discharged in 1919 to follow in his father's footsteps in the milling industry. He became manager of MacRae Knitting Mills Ltd prior to becoming a stockbroker in 1927.

Married in 1935 to Janet Cuthbertson Saxton, Utz then began to diversify into tin mining in Malaya and Thailand as well as becoming managing director of several businesses and helping found International Pacific Corporation Ltd. He was widowed in 1952, and became treasurer to the Australian Liberal Party in 1956. He served the party until 1962, raising substantial funds. An avid golfer, cricketer and horse racing enthusiast, he was an active benefactor to these causes and to that of cancer research, to which he left his $725,706 estate.
