= Marion Ellen Lea Allnutt =

Australian welfare worker (1896–1980)

Marion Allnutt MBE
- Born: Marion Ellen Lea Allnutt; 8 September 1896; Woodville Park, Adelaide, South Australia
- Died: 10 November 1980 (aged 84); Norwood, South Australia
- Other names: Polly
- Occupation: Welfare worker

Marion Ellen Lea "Polly" Allnutt MBE (8 September 1896 – 10 November 1980) was a welfare worker, and full-time secretary and commanding officer of the non-governmental Women's Australian National Services (WANS) from 1940.

== Early life ==
Allnutt was born in 1896 at Woodville Park in Adelaide to Earnest Allnutt, merchant, and Marion Anderson (née Fowler). She was educated at the Elder Conservatorium of Music, studying piano and accompanied soloists in concerts at the Adelaide Town Hall.

== Career ==
Her early career involved voluntary work, where she simultaneously served on the committee of the Walkerville Church of England Boys' Home between 1927 and 1952, the executive of the Kindergarten Union of South Australia between 1928 and 1938, and acted as a transport officer for the South Australian division of the Australian Red Cross Society between 1939 and 1941. She became a charter member of the Soroptimist Club of Adelaide and was its president between 1951 and 1953. During this time she was a founding member of WANS in South Australia. WANS was established as a non-governmental organization in World War II to provide assistance and training on the home front. She became its commanding officer in 1942 and in 1944, despite criticism, she organized WANS members to act as strikebreakers during a strike by domestic workers at the Royal Adelaide Hospital. She later helped organize the Wanslea Emergency Home for Children, which was opened at Payneham in March 1947 and later moved to Kingswood, before it phased out residential care and became a childcare centre in 1980. She did work on Wanslea council from 1947 to 1969 and then from 1975 to 1980. In 1951 she was made an M.B.E. "in recognition of service to the social welfare services in South Australia."

== Death and recognition ==
Allnutt Crescent in Forde, ACT.

Allnutt died on 10 November 1980 at Wynwood Nursing Home, Norwood, and was cremated. Marion Allnutt House at Wanslea Child Care Centre, Kingswood, was named after her in 1991, and Allnutt Crescent in Forde, Australian Capital Territory was named after her in 2007.
