= Gerard Smith (governor) =

Governor of Western Australia (1839–1920)

Sir Gerard Smith KCMG
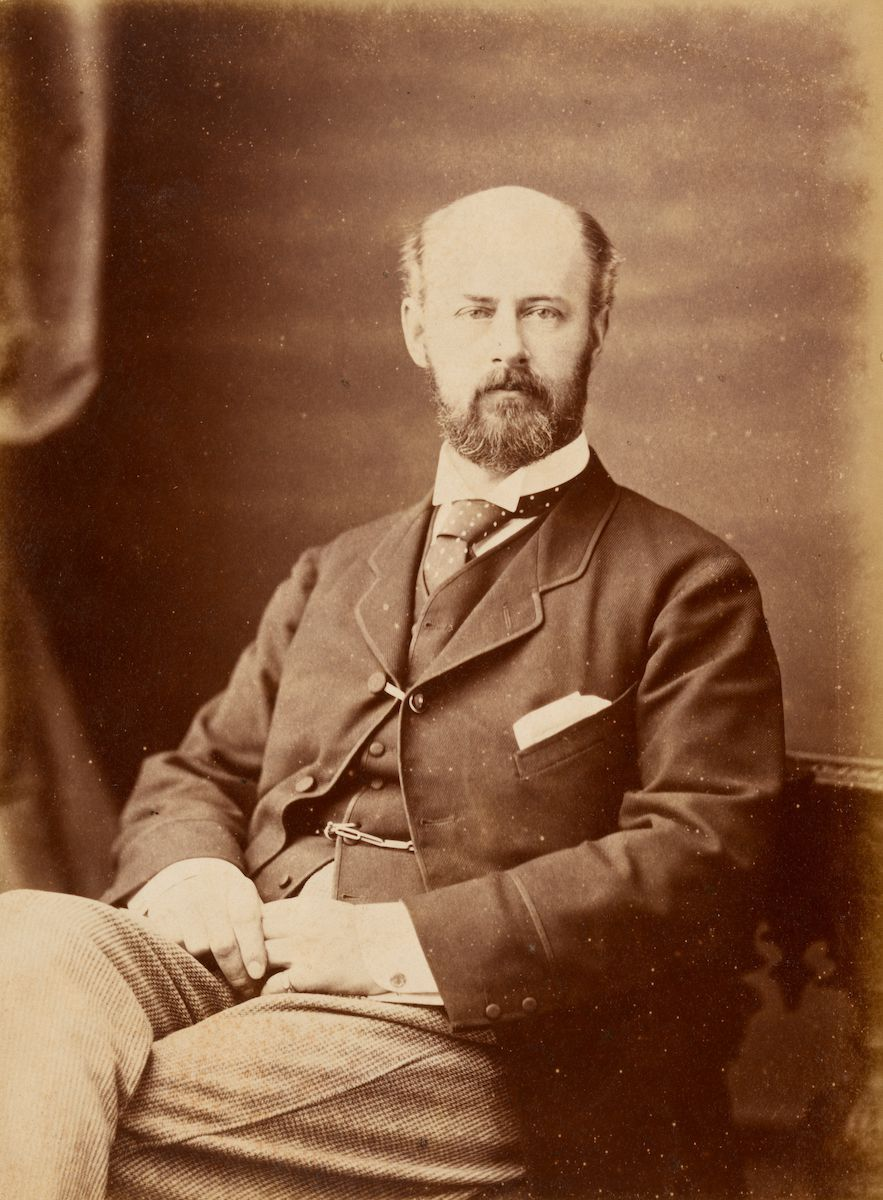
- Gerard Smith, circa 1890

12th Governor of Western Australia
- In office 23 December 1895 – 30 April 1901
- Monarchs: Victoria; Edward VII
- Premier: John Forrest; George Throssell
- Preceded by: Sir William Robinson
- Succeeded by: Sir Arthur Lawley

Member of Parliament for Wycombe
- In office 1883–1885
- Preceded by: Sir William Carington
- Succeeded by: Viscount Curzon

Personal details
- Born: 12 December 1839 Pimlico, London
- Died: 28 October 1920 (aged 80) London
- Spouse: Isabella Chatelaine Hamilton
- Relations: John Smith (paternal grandfather); Matthew White Ridley, 1st Viscount Ridley (maternal grandfather)
- Parent(s): Martin Tucker Smith; Louisa (Ridley) Smith

Military service
- Allegiance: United Kingdom
- Branch/service: British Army
- Years of service: 1857–1874
- Rank: Lieutenant Colonel
- Unit: Royal Scots Fusiliers

Lieutenant Colonel Sir Gerard Smith, KCMG (12 December 1839 – 28 October 1920), a member of the Smith and Carington family, was a business leader, politician, and Governor of Western Australia from 1895 to 1900.

== Early life ==
Gerard Smith was born on 12 December 1839 in Pimlico, London. He was the third son of Martin Tucker Smith (1803–1880), politician, banker and director of the East India Co., and Louisa (Ridley) Smith.

His paternal grandfather was John Smith (1767–1842), a banker and Tory Member of Parliament, and his maternal grandfather was Matthew White Ridley, a baronet.

== Career ==
Smith joined the Royal Scots Fusiliers as an ensign in 1857 and briefly saw service in Canada, retiring from the army in 1874. He joined the family bank, Samuel Smith, Bros. & Co., and went on to become a business leader in Kingston-upon-Hull, being instrumental in the formation of the Hull and Barnsley Railway in 1880. He succeeded his second cousin William Carington as a Liberal MP for Wycombe from 1883 to 1885, and was a Groom in Waiting to Queen Victoria in the same period.

In 1895, Smith was appointed Governor of Western Australia and knighted. He served as Governor until 1900.

== Freemasonry ==
Smith was a Freemason, being initiated into Studholme Lodge No. 1591 on 4 May 1880 at the age of 41. He was subsequently passed to the Second Degree and raised to the Third Degree within two months, and on 17 January 1890, became Worshipful Master of the Lodge. As was usual, when he was appointed Governor of Western Australia he was also appointed Past Junior Grand Warden of United Grand Lodge of England.

In 1898 he was appointed District Grand Master of the District Grand Lodge of Western Australia. He was a supporter of the Grand Lodge movement then active in the colony, allowing his lodges to discuss the question. When the Grand Lodge of Western Australia was consecrated on 27 February 1900, he was elected as its first Grand Master.

However, as his term as Governor was rapidly drawing to a close, he remained Grand Master for only one year.

== Death ==
Smith died in London on 28 October 1920. His wife predeceased him in 1915.

Parliament of the United Kingdom
Preceded by Sir William Carington	Member of Parliament for Wycombe; 1883–1885	Succeeded by Viscount Curzon
Government offices
Preceded by Sir William Robinson	Governor of Western Australia; 1895–1900	Succeeded by Sir Arthur Lawley
