= Henry Wylie Norman =

British Field Marshal

Field Marshal Sir Henry Norman GCB GCMG CIE
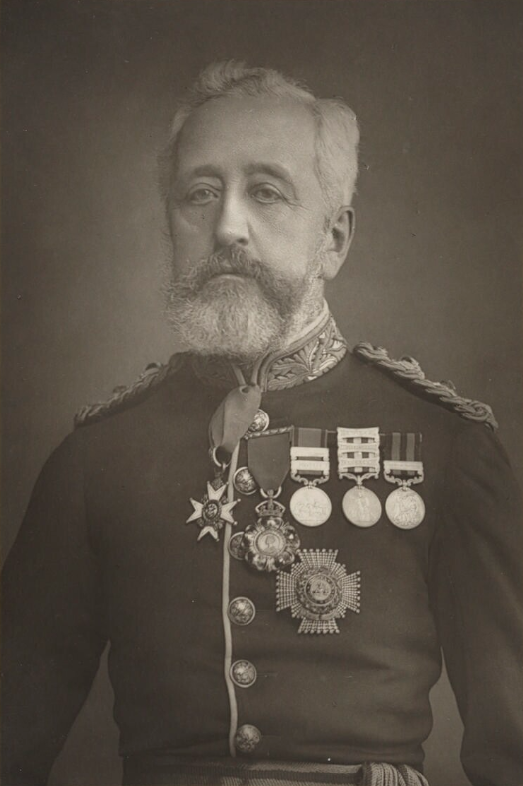

7th Governor of Queensland
- In office 1 May 1889 – 31 December 1895
- Monarch: Queen Victoria
- Premier: Boyd Dunlop Morehead; Samuel Griffith; Thomas McIlwraith; Hugh Nelson
- Preceded by: Anthony Musgrave
- Succeeded by: Lord Lamington

Governor of Jamaica
- In office 27 October 1883 – April–May 1889
- Monarch: Queen Victoria
- Preceded by: Anthony Musgrave; Somerset Wiseman-Clarke (acting); Dominic Jacotin Gamble (acting)
- Succeeded by: William Clive Justice (acting); Henry Arthur Blake

Personal details
- Born: 2 December 1826 London, Middlesex, England
- Died: 26 October 1904 (aged 77) London, Middlesex, England
- Resting place: Brompton Cemetery, London

Military service
- Allegiance: United Kingdom
- Branch/service: British Indian Army
- Years of service: 1844–1904
- Rank: Field Marshal
- Battles/wars: Second Anglo-Sikh War; Santhal rebellion; Indian Mutiny
- Awards: Knight Grand Cross of the Order of the Bath; Knight Grand Cross of the Order of St Michael and St George; Companion of the Order of the Indian Empire

Field Marshal Sir Henry Wylie Norman, GCB, GCMG, CIE (2 December 1826 – 26 October 1904) was a senior Indian Army officer and colonial administrator. He served in the Second Anglo-Sikh War, the campaign against the Kohat Pass Afridis, the suppression of the Santhal rebellion, and the suppression of the Indian Mutiny. He became military member of the Viceroy's Council (in effect Minister for War in India) in 1870, in which role he maintained the policy of ensuring that the Indian Army were less well armed than British troops there to deter another mutiny. As a result, he became a member of the Council of India; and in his later years he became Governor of Jamaica and then Governor of Queensland.

== Early life ==
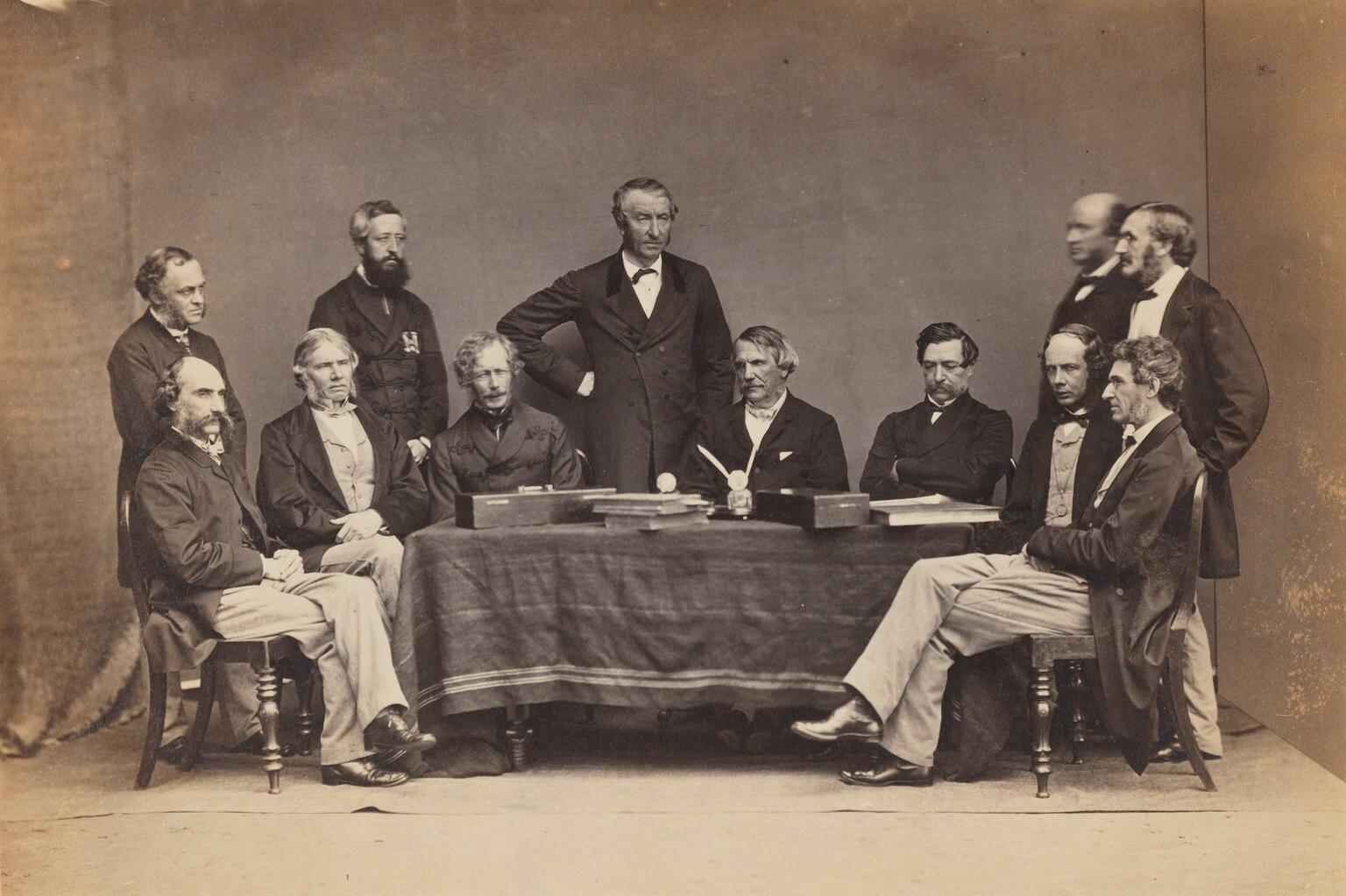
Henry Norman, standing second from left, with John Lawrence, Viceroy of India and other council members. c. 1864

Norman was the eldest son in the family of four sons and six daughters of the merchant James Norman and his wife Charlotte Wylie; Francis Booth Norman was the second son. His father conducted most of his business in Cuba, before moving to Calcutta. Norman joined the family firm in Calcutta in 1842, and then set about persuading his father to let him join the Bengal Army.

== Military career ==
Having obtained a cadetship in the Bengal Native Infantry, Norman was then commissioned as an ensign in the 1st Bengal Native Infantry on 1 March 1844 and then transferred to the 31st Bengal Native Infantry in March 1845. He was posted to Lahore in 1846 and, having been promoted to lieutenant on 25 December 1847, took part in the Battle of Ramnagar in November 1848, the Battle of Chillianwala in January 1849 and the Battle of Gujrat in February 1849 during the Second Anglo-Sikh War. Having attracted the favourable notice of Sir Colin Campbell, Norman was selected by Campbell to accompany an expedition against the Kohat Pass Afridis in 1850 as officiating brigade-major. The subaltern of twenty-four was given a substantive appointment in this capacity for a splendid deed of gallantry, which is recorded by Sir Charles Napier in the following terms:

In the pass of Kohat a sepoy picket, descending a precipitous mountain under fire and the rolling of large stones, had some men killed and wounded. Four of the latter, dreadfully hurt, crept under some rocks for shelter. They were not missed until the picket reached the bottom, but were then discovered by our glasses, high up and helpless. Fortunately the enemy did not see them, and some sepoys volunteered a rescue, headed by Norman of the 31st Native Infantry and Ensign Murray of the 70th Native Infantry. These brave men would that the names of all were known to me for record ascended the rocks in defiance of the enemy, and brought the wounded men down.

Norman served in numerous frontier expeditions between 1850 and 1854 and in the suppression of the Santhal rebellion of 1855 to 1856 before becoming assistant adjutant general in India in May 1856. During the Indian Mutiny he was constantly engaged, being present at the Siege of Delhi in Summer 1857, the Siege of Lucknow in November 1857, the Second Battle of Cawnpore in December 1857 and the Capture of Lucknow in March 1858. He was appointed a Companion of the Order of the Bath on 17 August 1859.

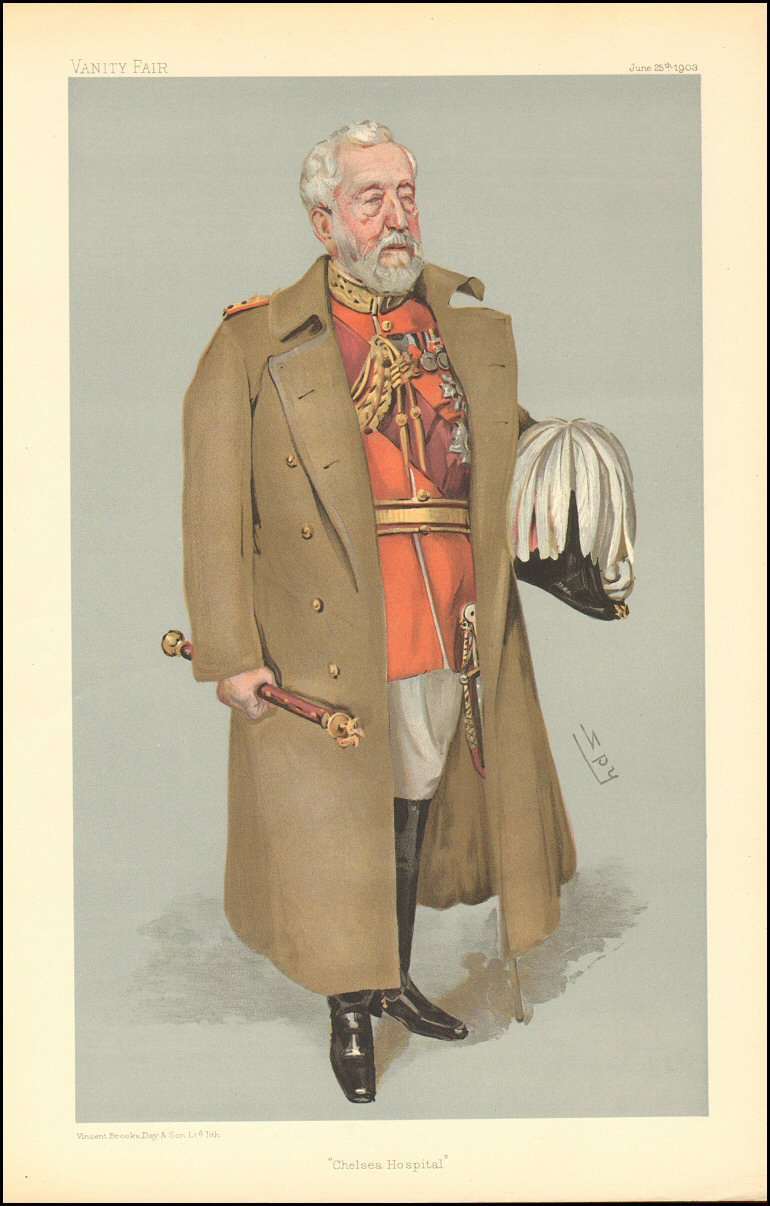
"Chelsea Hospital". Caricature by Spy published in Vanity Fair in 1903.

Promoted to captain on 1 March 1859, Norman became assistant military secretary for Indian affairs at the Horse Guards in October 1860. He was further promoted to brevet major on 3 December 1860 and to brevet lieutenant colonel on 4 December 1860. He went back to India in 1861 as deputy adjutant general of the Bengal Army and then became military secretary to the government of India in January 1862. He was appointed an aide-de-camp to the Queen in September 1863 and, having been promoted to the substantive rank of major on 1 March 1864, to brevet colonel on 8 September 1868 and to brevet major-general on 23 March 1869, he was given the substantive rank of lieutenant colonel on 1 March 1870.

Norman went on to become military member of the Governor-General's Council (in effect Minister for War in India) in May 1870, in which role he maintained the policy of ensuring that the Indian Army were less well armed than British troops there to deter another mutiny. He was advanced to Knight Commander of the Order of the Bath on 24 May 1873, promoted to lieutenant general on 1 October 1877 and returned to London to become a member of the Council of India in February 1878. He was promoted to full general on 1 April 1882 and retired from active military service.

== Later life ==
In October 1883, Norman became Governor of Jamaica and implemented the decision of the Colonial Office to introduce a new constitution intended to limit the ability of the local assembly, which was dominated by white plantation owners, to make all decisions. Appointed a Knight Grand Cross of the Order of St Michael and St George on 24 May 1887 and advanced to Knight Grand Cross of the Order of the Bath on 21 June 1887, he was transferred to the post of Governor of Queensland in 1889: although his mandate was to cut public expenditure, he managed to get on well with both the local politicians and the local people who were impressed by his administrative skills. Declining the post of Viceroy of India in September 1893, Norman left Queensland in November 1895 and returned to London. He was appointed a Commissioner to enquire into the conditions and prospects of the West India Sugar-growing Colonies in December 1896.

Norman became governor of the Royal Hospital Chelsea in April 1901, and, having been promoted to field marshal on 26 June 1902, became a Commissioner to inquire into the military preparations for the Second Boer War in September 1902. He died at the Royal Hospital Chelsea on 26 October 1904 and was buried in Brompton Cemetery.

There is a memorial to him in St Paul's Cathedral.

== Family ==
On 14 April 1853, at Peshawar in India, Norman married Selina Eliza Davidson (d.1862) by whom he had three daughters. He married a widow, Jemima Anne Temple (née Knowles), in September 1864 but she died the year after. Then on 1 March 1870 he married Alice Claudine Sandys, daughter of Teignmouth Sandys of the Bengal Civil Service. They had two sons and a daughter.

Children of Henry Wylie Norman and Selina Eliza Davidson

1. Mary Lucy Norman b. 25 Apr 1854
2. Helen Campbell Norman b. 27 Jan 1856, leading military nurse
3. Annie Forde Norman b. 15 Sep 1857

Children of Henry Wylie Norman and Alice Claudine Sandys

1. Walter Henry Norman b. 14 Jun 1871
2. Claude Lumsden Norman b. 19 Feb 1876
3. Grace Alice Norman b.

== Sources ==
- Napier, Sir Charles (1857). Defects, Civil and military. Charles Westerton. ASIN B0008BMON2.
- Heathcote, Tony (1999). The British Field Marshals 1736 – 1997. Leo Cooper. ISBN 0-85052-696-5.

Government offices
Preceded by Dominic Jacotin Gamble, acting	Governor of Jamaica; 1883–1889	Succeeded by William Clive Justice, acting
Preceded by Sir Anthony Musgrave	Governor of Queensland; 1889–1895	Succeeded by Lord Lamington
Honorary titles
Preceded by Sir Donald Stewart	Governor, Royal Hospital Chelsea; 1901–1904	Succeeded by Sir George White
