= Jenico Preston, 14th Viscount Gormanston =

Anglo-Irish colonial administrator (1837–1907)

The Right Honourable The Viscount Gormanston GCMG
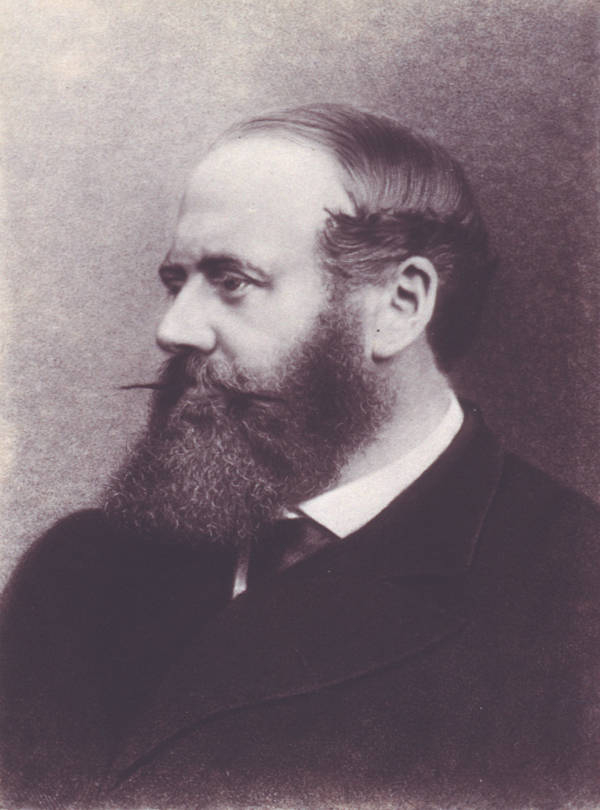

35th Governor of the Leeward Islands
- In office 1885–1887
- Monarch: Victoria
- Preceded by: Charles Monroe Eldridge
- Succeeded by: Charles Mitchell

14th Governor of British Guiana
- In office 1887–1893
- Monarch: Victoria
- Preceded by: Charles Bruce
- Succeeded by: Charles Bruce

7th Governor of Tasmania
- In office 8 August 1893 – 14 August 1900
- Monarch: Victoria
- Preceded by: Robert Hamilton
- Succeeded by: Arthur Havelock

Personal details
- Born: 1 June 1837 Gormanston Castle, County Meath, Ireland
- Died: 29 October 1907 (aged 70) Dublin, Ireland
- Spouse(s): 1. Ismay Louisa Ursula Bellew; 2. Georgina Jane Connellan

Jenico William Joseph Preston, 14th Viscount Gormanston, GCMG (1 June 1837 – 29 October 1907), was an aristocratic Anglo-Irish colonial administrator.

== Biography ==
Born at Gormanston Castle, County Meath, he was the elder son and heir of Edward Preston, 13th Viscount Gormanston, by his wife Lucretia, daughter of William Charles Jerningham, brother of the 8th Baron Stafford.

He was commissioned into the 60th King's Royal Rifle Corps in 1855, and served as a Lieutenant during the Indian Rebellion of 1857, before retiring from the British Army in 1860.

As the Hon. Jenico Preston he served as High Sheriff of County Dublin (1865), County Meath (1871) before being appointed Chamberlain to the Lord Lieutenant of Ireland, the Marquess of Abercorn KG, between 1866 and 1868. He succeeded his father in the viscountcy in 1876, having entered the House of Lords under the subsidiary title of Baron Gormanston, created for his father in the Peerage of the United Kingdom in 1868.

In 1885 Gormanston was appointed Governor of the Leeward Islands, a post he held until 1887, and then served as Governor of British Guiana from 1887 to 1893 and as Governor of Tasmania from 1893 to 1900.

Appointed KCMG in 1887, he was promoted GCMG in 1897.

Lord Gormanston married firstly the Hon. Ismay Louisa Ursula Bellew, daughter of Patrick, 1st Baron Bellew, in 1861; they had no children. After his first wife's death in 1875, he married secondly Georgina Jane Connellan, daughter of Major Peter Connellan, in 1878; they had three sons and one daughter.

Georgina, Lady Gormanston suggested that a maternity hospital would be a fitting way of marking Queen Victoria's Diamond Jubilee. At the time the only assistance to pregnant women came from untrained and unregulated midwives. It was agreed and a committee of women manage the Queen Victoria Maternity Hospital which opened in September 1897.

Lord Gormanston died at Dublin in October 1907, aged 70, and was succeeded in his titles by his eldest son Jenico Edward Joseph Preston, 15th Viscount Gormanston.

He held almost 11,000 acres in Meath and Dublin.

== See also ==
- Peerage of Ireland
- Knights Grand Cross of the Order of St Michael and St George

== Notes ==
Government offices
Preceded by Charles Monroe Eldridge	Governor of the Leeward Islands; 1885–1887	Succeeded by Sir Charles Mitchell, (acting)
Preceded by Sir Charles Bruce	Governor of British Guiana; 1887–1893	Succeeded by Sir Charles Bruce
Preceded by Sir Robert Hamilton	Governor of Tasmania; 1893–1900	Succeeded by Sir Arthur Havelock
Peerage of Ireland
Preceded by Edward Anthony John Preston; 13th Viscount	Viscount Gormanston; 1876–1907	Succeeded by Jenico Edward Joseph Preston; 15th Viscount
