= 1795 in Australia =

- Decades: 1780s; 1790s; 1800s; 1810s
- See also: Other events of 1795; Timeline of Australian history

The following lists events that happened during 1795 in Australia.

== Leaders ==
- Monarch - George III
- Acting Governor of New South Wales – William Paterson
- Governor of New South Wales – John Hunter
- Lieutenant-Governor of Norfolk Island – Philip Gidley King
- Commanding officer of the New South Wales Corps – William Paterson
- Inspector of Public Works – John Macarthur

== Events ==
- May or June – The Battle of Richmond Hill takes place between the native Darug people and the New South Wales Corps.
- 7 September – HMS Reliance arrives in Sydney. Among the ship's passengers and crew are the Aboriginal Bennelong returning from a visit to England, the surgeon and explorer George Bass, and midshipman Matthew Flinders.
- 11 September – Floods devastate the farms at Hawkesbury.
- ? - A tornado strikes Sydney, destroying crops and trees in the early settlement, 1st tornado recorded in the BOM's severe weather archives.

== Births ==
- 28 April – Charles Sturt
- 21 July – George Gawler, second Governor of South Australia, born in Southsea.
