= 1793 in Australia =

- Decades: 1780s; 1790s; 1800s; 1810s
- See also: Other events of 1793; Timeline of Australian history

The following lists events that happened during 1793 in Australia.

== Leaders ==
- Monarch - George III
- Acting Governor of New South Wales – Lieutenant-Governor Francis Grose
- Lieutenant-Governor of Norfolk Island – Philip Gidley King
- Commanding officer of the New South Wales Corps – Francis Grose

== Events ==
- 16 January – Bellona arrives with Australia's first free settlers.
- 22 January – The French d'Entrecasteaux expedition returns to Recherche Bay, Tasmania, to rewater and rest.
- 12 February – John Macarthur is granted 100 acres (0.40 km^{2}) of land at Parramatta.
- 16 February – John Macarthur is appointed by Grose as inspector of public works.
- 18 February – A school opens in an unfinished church building in Sydney; Isabella Rosson is the first teacher (the first school had been established in 1789).
- 28 February – d'Entrecasteaux expedition leaves Tasmania towards the Friendly Islands, continuing the search for La Pérouse.
- 2 May – Mary Bryant is pardoned in England.
- May – Bennelong and Yemmerrawanne become the first Aboriginal Australians to visit Britain when they land at Falmouth, Cornwall, with Arthur Phillip.
- 15 September – Captain William Paterson leads a party of Scotsmen in the first attempt to cross the Blue Mountains. He is unsuccessful.
- 25 September – Sydney's first church opens.
- Macquarie Lighthouse, the first in Australia, is erected in Sydney.

== Births ==
- 8 March – David Jones
- 1 June – Augustus Earle
