= 1794 in Australia =

- Decades: 1780s; 1790s; 1800s; 1810s
- See also: Other events of 1794; Timeline of Australian history

The following lists events that happened during 1794 in Australia.

== Leaders ==
- Monarch - George III
- Acting Governor of New South Wales – Lieutenant-Governor Francis Grose
- Lieutenant-Governor of Norfolk Island – Philip Gidley King
- Commanding officer of the New South Wales Corps – Francis Grose
- Inspector of Public Works – John Macarthur

== Events ==
- 6 February – Captain John Hunter (former commander of HMS Sirius is appointed as Phillip's replacement as governor. However, he is in England at the time and will not arrive until September 1795.
- 1 April – John Macarthur receives a further grant of 100 acres (0.40 km^{2}) at Parramatta.
- 18 May – Yemmerrawanne dies in England.
- 20 August – A third attempt to cross the Blue Mountains is made, this time led by Henry Hacking; they return on 27th – unsuccessful.
- 17 December – Grose leaves New South Wales for England. His positions as acting governor and commander of the New South Wales Corps are both filled by William Paterson.
- The first road between Sydney and Paramatta is cleared

== Births ==
- 22 March – Frederick Irwin, acting Governor of Western Australia (d. 1860)
- 10 November – Robert Towns, master mariner (d. 1873)
- date unknown
  - Elizabeth Underwood, founder of Ashfield, New South Wales (d. 1858)

== Deaths ==
- 9 June – Possible death of Robert Ross (records are unclear).
