= 1792 in Australia =

- Decades: 1780s; 1790s; 1800s; 1810s
- See also: Other events of 1792; Timeline of Australian history

The following lists events that happened during 1792 in Australia.

== Leaders ==
- Monarch - George III
- Governor of New South Wales – Captain Arthur Phillip
- Lieutenant-Governor of Norfolk Island – Philip Gidley King
- Commanding officer of the New South Wales Corps – Francis Grose

== Events ==
- 14 February – Sydney's first retail shop opens.
- 23 April – The French d'Entrecasteaux expedition, consisting of frigates Recherche and Espérance, land at Recherche Bay, Tasmania to rewater and rest.
- 28 May – d'Entrecasteaux expedition leaves Tasmania and sails into the Pacific to search for La Pérouse.
- 14 July – The Home Secretary authorises Phillip to make land grants to civil and military officers.
- 1 November – The Philadelphia becomes the first foreign trading vessel to visit Sydney.
- December – d'Entrecasteaux expedition makes land near Cape Leeuwin and explores south coast of Western Australia.
- 10 December – With the colony beginning to flourish, Phillip is granted leave and permitted to return to England. He leaves on the Atlantic, taking Bennelong and Yemmerrawanne with him, and retires to a quiet life in Bath. While the British government decides on a replacement, Francis Grose (the commanding officer of the New South Wales Corps) takes control as Acting Governor.
- 11 December – Francis Grose officially takes up his role as Administrator
- 24 December – The American ship Hope arrives in Sydney; Grose is forced to buy alcohol to obtain other cargo.

== Births ==
- 9 March – Robert Johnston
- 16 June – Major Sir Thomas Livingston Mitchell surveyor and explorer.
- 20 October – John Pascoe Fawkner
