= Battle of Richmond Hill =

1795 battle of the Hawkesbury and Nepean Wars

- Part of Hawkesbury and Nepean Wars
Date	7 June 1795
Location	Richmond, New South Wales, Australia 33°35′54″S 150°42′04″E
Result	Colonial victory

Belligerents
Kingdom of Great Britain: (Kingdom of Great Britain) Colony of New South Wales	Darug warriors Yaragowhy, charley

Commanders and leaders
(Kingdom of Great Britain) Capt. William Paterson	Pemulwuy

Units involved
(Kingdom of Great Britain) New South Wales Corps	

Strength
2 officers 66 marines 3 drummer boys	50+

Casualties and losses
Unknown	7-8 killed several wounded 6 captured

The Battle of Richmond Hill, also known as the Battle of the Hawkesbury and the Richmond Hill Massacre, was a battle of the Hawkesbury and Nepean Wars, which were fought between the Indigenous Darug people and the New South Wales Corps (also including several armed settlers).

== Settlers replace Indigenous crops ==
Four hundred British settlers moved onto the lands of the Darug people along the Hawkesbury River in 1794 and began to construct farms. They removed yam beds that had been cultivated along the river by Indigenous people and they planted Indian corn (maize).

Indigenous people saw the corn on their land as a replacement carbohydrate of the yams and when it ripened, both men and women began carried it off in nets and later blankets. Settlers fired shots on Indigenous people to drive them away. Some settlers kidnapped babies and toddlers from the fleeing parents, saying that parents had abandoned them. Parents gathered near farms and begged for the return of the children.

An Indigenous boy was killed by settlers and Governor Arthur Phillip had previously ordered that Aboriginal people remain unharmed, so Lieutenant John Macarthur held an inquiry into the murder. Robert Forrester admitted to killing the boy, arguing that he was a spy and justified it as a mercy killing. Indigenous people customarily sent young boys forward to initiate contact or scope an area for safety. Indigenous people probably heard the screams, then in retribution attacked the settlers' neighbours, who survived the incident and this was possibly a case of mistaken identity.

This was followed by a series of raids on settlers. where Indigenous people took food, clothing, arms and anything else they could carry. In response, settlers chased Indigenous people with guns and killed seven or eight of them "on the spot". This sparked more cycles of killings.

The Natives of the Hawkesbury ... lived on the wild yams on the banks. Cultivation has rooted out these, and poverty compelled them to steal Indian corn ... They [soldiers and settlers] came upon them [Indigenous people] unarmed, and unexpected, killed and wounded many more. The dead they hang on gibbets, in terrorem. The war may be universal on the part of the blacks, whose improvement and civilisation will be a long time deferred. The people killed were unfortunately the most friendly of the blacks, and one of them more than once saved the life of a white man.

— Rev Thomas Fyshe Palmer (3 June 1796)

In May 1795 New South Wales Corps soldiers fought against Indigenous Darug warriors at Richmond Hill. When the corn was ripening, settlers sent a report to the NSW Corps barracks in Parramatta stating that there were sightings of Aboriginal people intending to take the corn. Acting Governor William Patterson deployed 62 soldiers to the Hawkesbury River with the instruction to hang any Aboriginal they could find and to drive others away. The soldiers found Indigenous camps at night and fired into the dark. The commanding officer reported that seven or eight were killed, but the morning after the bodies were gone. They took five prisoners to Parramatta, one of the women taken was carrying a baby who had been shot through her body. The baby died in hospital and the prisoners were released three days later. The battles in the area continued until 1816.

== Memorial ==
A memorial garden exists at St John of God Hospital Richmond commemorating Aboriginal victims of the battle and colonial violence across the region. It was established in 2002 through community consultation, with "a significant effort from many Aboriginal and non-Aboriginal people" and was funded by Reconciliation NSW.

== Yams on the Hawkesbury River ==
The yam that is described in the conflicts on the Hawkesbury River is difficult to identify. The settlers used the word yam to describe edible plants with carbohydrate-rich fleshy parts that grow underground, such as tubers, rhizomes, corms or bulbs.

Kate Grenville's 2005 historical novel The Secret River popularised the idea that the yams at Hawkesbury River were murnong, known by the Darug people as midyini.

A more common yam was the vine plant Dioscorea transversa, which was found in woodland areas of the Cumberland Plains, but not along the river.

Academic Geoffrey Ford suggests the yams were a marsh club-rush (Bolboschoenus fluviatilis) that grew along the riverside and also that the Indigenous people living on the river at Richmond Hill were Darkinyung people, not Darug.

The yam might be the Bind-weed (Convolvulus erubescens), which has a tough and starchy root that was cooked and kneaded into a dough. The plant grows in the Hawkesbury River area and has pink flowers. The root is called Taaruuk by the Gunditjmara and Djab wurrung people in Victoria and the same name was also given to the root of the Small-leaved Clematis (Clematis microphylla). The locality of Tandarook in Victoria is named after the yam called darook, which is likely to be the same as the dark-leaved yam called djarug known to the Wergaia people in northwest Victoria. J L Kohen used this Victorian Indigenous name of a yam to describe the Darug people of Blacktown as those who ate yams, but the two words might not be linked.

The Darug word for Hawkesbury River is Dyarubbin, Dyirabun or Deerubbin. The Gandangara people used similar words, dyirrabany or dyirraban, for an unknown species of yam found in riverside habitats, which shows that Indigenous people thought of the Hawkesbury River as the river of yams. The Wiradjuri people used a similar word, dirrinan, for the yam-like Bulbine bulbosa plant which has edible corms.

In a diary entry of July 1789, John Hunter noted Indigenous people roasting "wild yams, about the size of a walnut" on the banks of the Hawkesbury River, but after consuming the yams he felt sick in the stomach and suggested that they must be prepared in some way.

On the banks here also we found yams and other roots, and had evident marks of the natives frequenting these parts in search of them for food. They have no doubt some method of preparing these roots, before they can eat them; for we found one kind which some of the company had seen the natives dig up; and with which being pleased, as it had much the appearance of horse-radish, and had a sweetish taste, and having swallowed a small quantity, it occasioned violent spasms, cramps in the bowels, and sickness at the stomach: it might probably be the casada root.

— John Hunter

== See also ==
- Battle of Parramatta
