= 1797 in Australia =

- Decades: 1780s; 1790s; 1800s; 1810s
- See also: Other events of 1797; Timeline of Australian history

The following lists events that happened during 1797 in Australia.

== Leaders ==
- Monarch - George III
- Governor of New South Wales – John Hunter
- Lieutenant-Governor of Norfolk Island – Philip Gidley King
- Inspector of Public Works – Richard Atkins

== Events ==
- 9 February – Sydney Cove wrecked off Tasmania. Some of the crew manage to reach Sydney more than 600 km away, leading to the rescue of other members of the crew.
- 26 June – HMS Reliance arrives in Sydney from the Cape of Good Hope, carrying stores ordered by Governor John Hunter and 26 merino sheep purchased by Captain Henry Waterhouse and Lieutenant William Kent. Wool pioneer John Macarthur would then acquire his first Merino sheep from them.
- 3 July – Following Aboriginal attacks on farms in the Hawkesbury region, Hunter dispatches a party of soldiers from the New South Wales Corps to protect settlers there.
- 1 August – Following advice from the master of the Sydney Cove who observed currents and tides while wrecked on Preservation Island, Governor Hunter writes to Joseph Banks that it seems certain that the yet-to-be-discovered Bass Strait exists.
- 19 September – John Shortland is the first European to enter the port of Newcastle. On the 9th he discovered the Hunter River estuary and coal.
- 3 December – George Bass sets out from Sydney in a whaleboat with six oarsmen to explore south along the coast. He discovers the Kiama Blowhole (6 December) and the Shoalhaven River (7 December), he also visits Jervis Bay, and named Twofold Bay on 19 December, Wilson's Promontory (2 January 1798) and Western Port (5 January). He returns to Sydney two months later, having greatly increased the settlers' knowledge of the geography of Australia.

== Births ==
- 8 May – John Septimus Roe
- 19 June – Australian explorer Hamilton Hume born at Parramatta, New South Wales
- 20 July – Paweł Edmund Strzelecki
