= 1796 in Australia =

- Decades: 1780s; 1790s; 1800s; 1810s
- See also: Other events of 1796; Timeline of Australian history

The following lists events that happened during 1796 in Australia.

== Leaders ==
- Monarch - George III
- Governor of New South Wales – John Hunter
- Lieutenant-Governor of Norfolk Island – Philip Gidley King
- Inspector of Public Works – John Macarthur/Richard Atkins

== Events ==
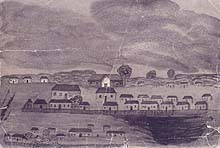
A pen and wash drawing of Sydney in 1796

- 16 January – Australia's first theatre opens in Sydney. Edward Young's The Revenge and the comedy The Hotel are the first works performed.
- 23 January – The distillation of spirits is prohibited.
- 5 February – Soldiers from the New South Wales Corps wreck a house belonging to millwright John Baughan.
- 10 February – Magistrate William Balmain challenges Macarthur over the house-wrecking incident.
- 29 February – Macarthur resigns as Inspector of the Public Works and is replaced by Richard Atkins.
- June – George Bass makes an unsuccessful attempt to cross the Blue Mountains. Coal is discovered near Port Stephens.
- 14 September – Governor Hunter complains to the Colonial Secretary of Macarthur's behaviour.
- 15 September – Macarthur complains to Colonial Secretary of Hunter's governing.
- 9 November – As Sydney grows, Hunter disbands the convict night watch. He divides Sydney into four districts responsible for their own watchmen and orders houses to be numbered.

== Births ==
- 20 March – Edward Gibbon Wakefield
- date unknown
  - Henry Vincent, first superintendent of Rottnest Island Aboriginal Prison (d. 1869)
