= 1801 in Australia =

- Decades: 1780s; 1790s; 1800s; 1810s; 1820s
- See also: Other events of 1801; Timeline of Australian history

The following lists events that happened during 1801 in Australia.

== Incumbents ==
- Monarch - George III

=== Governors ===
Governors of the Australian colonies:

- Governor of New South Wales – Captain Philip King

== Events ==
- 14 September – John Macarthur takes part in a duel with his commanding officer, Lieutenant Colonel William Paterson. Paterson is severely wounded in the shoulder, and Macarthur is arrested the next day. Governor King offers to release him on Norfolk Island but Macarthur refuses and is sent to England to be court martialed.
- The schooner Cumberland (28 tons) is launched in Sydney. The vessel is purchased by the government and becomes the first armed vessel belonging to the colony.

== Exploration and settlement ==
- January – Brig Harbinger, under John Black, is the second vessel to sail through Bass Strait en route to Port Jackson.
- 27 May – The French cartographic expedition of Nicolas Baudin sights Cape Hamelin.
- 6 December – Matthew Flinders reaches Cape Leeuwin on HMS Investigator and proceeds to make a survey along the southern coast of the Australian mainland.

== Births ==
- 21 January – John Batman, founder of Victoria (died 1839)

== Deaths ==
- 8 June – Thomas Vasse, French sailor
