= 1791 in Australia =

- Decades: 1780s; 1790s; 1800s; 1810s
- See also: Other events of 1791; Timeline of Australian history

The following lists events that happened during 1791 in Australia.

== Leaders ==
- Monarch - George III
- Governor of New South Wales – Captain Arthur Phillip, RN
- Lieutenant-Governor of Norfolk Island – Philip Gidley King
- Commanding officer of the colony's marine presence – Major Robert Ross

== Events ==
Watercolour painting of the Governor's House at Port Jackson in 1791

- 22 February – The first land grant in Australia is made to ex-convict James Ruse.
- March – Philip Gidley King returns to Norfolk Island from Britain and resumes command from Robert Ross.
- 3 May – 1st Lt. Ralph Clark records in his diary that he has ordered three female convicts flogged. Catherine White faints after the first 15 lashes, Mary Teut after 22. When Mary Higgins has received 26 lashes, Lieutenant Clark "forgave her the remainder (he has ordered 50) because she was an old woman".
- 2 June – Rose Hill renamed Parramatta.
- 1 August – The Third Fleet begins to arrive with convicts and supplies; the first ship, Matilda brings 205 convicts.
- 18 August – Richard Bowen enters and names Jervis Bay aboard the Atlantic.
- 28 September – The ships Active and Queen arrive; Queen is coming from Cork, with the first contingent of Irish convicts.
- 29 September – The West Coast of Australia is claimed by British Commander George Vancouver when he sailed into King George Sound, previously only the east coast had been claimed for the Crown.
- 16 October – Admiral Barrington, the last ship of the Third Fleet arrives, with Captain William Paterson of the New South Wales Corps on board.
- 24 October – Britannia and William and Ann set out on Australia's first whaling expedition.
- 1 November – twenty-one convicts escape from Port Jackson and attempt to walk to China. Some die in the wilderness, while others are recaptured.
- 5 December – Ross returns to Port Jackson from Norfolk Island. His marines, having been displaced by the newly arrived New South Wales Corps, are frequently drunk and rowdy. On 17 December, Ross and most of the marines returned to England on HMS Gorgon.

== Births ==
- January – James Stirling
- 26 April – John Lee Archer
- 13 July – Allan Cunningham, botanist and explorer, best known for discovering the Darling Downs is born in Wimbledon, London.
- 4 August – Henry Savery
- 13 December – Phillip Parker King
- George Gipps

== Deaths ==
- 28 January – Henry Dodd
