= 1798 in Australia =

- Decades: 1780s; 1790s; 1800s; 1810s
- See also: Other events of 1798; Timeline of Australian history

The following lists events that happened during 1798 in Australia.

== Leaders ==
- Monarch – George III
- Governor of New South Wales – John Hunter
- Lieutenant-Governor of Norfolk Island – Philip Gidley King
- Inspector of Public Works – Richard Atkins

== Events ==
- 2 January – George Bass sights Wilsons Promontory.
- 26 January – The koala and lyrebird are observed by John Price on an expedition led by John Wilson.
- 12 February – Matthew Flinders explores the Furneaux Islands.
- 25 February – John Hunter names Bass Strait in honour of George Bass.
- 14 May – HMS Nautilus arrives in Sydney, carrying missionaries from the London Missionary Society .
- 1 October – Sydney's first church St Philip's is destroyed by fire.
- 7 October – George Bass and Matthew Flinders leave Sydney to explore Van Diemen's Land on the Norfolk.
- 7 October – St Phillip's Church founded in Sydney, completed in 1809.
- 8 November – Nauru discovered by John Fearn.
- 9 December – Bass and Flinders confirm the existence of the Bass Strait.
- 22 December – Norfolk enters the River Derwent,
- 25 December – George Bass climbs Mount Wellington.
