= 1800 in Australia =

- Decades: 1780s; 1790s; 1800s; 1810s; 1820s
- See also: Other events of 1800; Timeline of Australian history

The following list contains events that happened during 1800 in Australia.

== Incumbents ==
- Monarch - George III
- Governor of New South Wales – Captain John Hunter (until 20 April), then Captain Philip King (from 28 September)

== Events ==
- 26 April – William Balmain receives a land grant on the east side of Cockle Bay.
- 26 June – Major Joseph Foveaux is appointed Lieutenant-Governor of Norfolk Island.
- 16 July – Richard Johnson and Samuel Marsden open a church school in Kissing Point (Ryde).
- 7 September – Joseph Holt is arrested on suspicion of raising an Irish insurrection.
- 28 September – Captain Philip King sworn in as governor, as the previous governor Captain John Hunter returns to England.
- 29 September – William Paterson is appointed lieutenant governor of the colony.
- 19 November – The first copper coins are circulated in New South Wales. To prevent their removal from the colony they were issued at double their face value, that is a coin valued at one penny in England was deemed to represent twopence in New South Wales.
- 3 December – The brig Lady Nelson and Lt. James Grant arrive in Southern Australia; Grant names Cape Northumberland, Cape Banks, Mount Schanck and Mount Gambier.
- 7 December – Grant names Cape Otway; the Lady Nelson becomes the first ship to cross Bass Strait from the west.
- John Macarthur sends sample fleeces of merino wool to England from Australia to determine their quality.

== Births ==
- 1 June – William Bradley, New South Wales politician
- 11 December – William Bowman, New South Wales politician
