= 1802 in Australia =

- Decades: 1780s; 1790s; 1800s; 1810s; 1820s
- See also: Other events of 1802; Timeline of Australian history

The following lists events that happened during 1802 in Australia.

== Incumbents ==
- Monarch - George III

=== Governors ===
Governors of the Australian colonies:

- Governor of New South Wales – Captain Philip King

== Events ==
- 8 April – Matthew Flinders meets the French explorer Nicolas Baudin at Encounter Bay.
- 2 June – Pemulwuy is shot and killed following the killing of four white men at Parramatta and Toongabbie.
- 9 October – The first book printed in Australia, an abridged version of the New South Wales General Standing Orders, is published under supervision by the government printer, George Howe.

== Exploration and settlement ==
- 14 February – Acting lieutenant John Murray, commander of the Lady Nelson, explores Port Phillip.
- 1 May – Matthew Flinders becomes the first European to visit the You Yangs ranges near Geelong, Victoria. He and three of his men climb to the highest point, naming it "Station Peak". It is later renamed Flinders Peak.

== Deaths ==
- 2 June – Pemulwuy (b. c. 1750), Indigenous Australian resistance leader
- 2 June - Thomas Fyshe Palmer, Unitarian minister, political reformer and convict.
- 12 June – Peter Good, English gardener on Matthew Flinders' voyage
