= 1799 in Australia =

- Decades: 1780s; 1790s; 1800s; 1810s
- See also: Other events of 1799; Timeline of Australian history

The following lists events that happened during 1799 in Australia.

== Leaders ==
- Monarch - George III
- Governor of New South Wales – John Hunter
- Lieutenant-Governor of Norfolk Island – Philip Gidley King
- Inspector of Public Works – Richard Atkins

== Events ==
- 7 January – Bass and Flinders complete their circumnavigation of Van Diemen's Land in sloop Norfolk.
- 11 February – The jail in Sydney is burned by arsonists.
- 3 March – Hawkesbury River floods, killing one.
- 12 March – Isaac Nichols is accused of stealing stolen goods and sentenced to 14 years on Norfolk Island; his sentence is suspended by Governor Hunter on 1 April
- 8 July – Matthew Flinders leaves Port Jackson to explore the East coast in sloop Norfolk; he surveys Moreton Bay between the 15th and 31st and charts Hervey Bay on 2 August. He returns to Sydney on 20 August.
- 18 October – Five settlers are found guilty of killing aborigines in the Hawkesbury, they are later pardoned.
- 5 November – Hunter is recalled and Philip Gidley King is named as his successor
- 28 December – The jail in Parramatta is lost to arson.

== Births ==
- 25 August – John Dunmore Lang
- 2 October – William Lonsdale
- 15 October – Archibald Mosman

== Deaths ==
- 26 January – Thomas Muir
