= 1803 in Australia =

- Decades: 1780s; 1790s; 1800s; 1810s; 1820s
- See also: Other events of 1803; Timeline of Australian history

The following events happened in Australia in the year 1803.

== Incumbents ==
- Monarch - George III

=== Governors ===
Governors of the Australian colonies:

- Governor of New South Wales – Captain Philip King

== Events ==
- 14 January – Lieut-Col David Collins is commissioned in England to found a new settlement on Bass Strait, preferably at Port Phillip.
- 5 March – George Howe publishes the first issue of the weekly The Sydney Gazette and The New South Wales Advertiser, Australia's first newspaper.
- 19 April - Governor King proclaims toleration for Catholics and allows Fr James Dixon to say mass for Irish convicts.
- 14 May - Illegal Masonic meeting held in Sydney and all participants arrested.
- 25 November - William James Hobart Thorne is born at Port Phillip. He is the first white child born in what will later become the state of Victoria. He dies on 2 July 1872.
- 27 December – Convict William Buckley escapes from Sullivan Bay, Victoria. He lives with the Wautharong Aboriginal people for 32 years.
- 26 June – John Macarthur writes the Statement of Improvement and Progression of Fine Woolled Sheep in New South Wales.

== Exploration and settlement ==
- January–February – Acting Lieutenant Charles Robbins and NSW Surveyor General Charles Grimes survey Port Phillip in HMS Cumberland
- 2 February – Charles Grimes discovered the Yarra River.
- 9 June – Investigator arrives in Port Jackson after circumnavigating Australia. On the voyage Matthew Flinders charted the coast and Robert Brown made an extensive collection of the flora of Australia.
- 11 September – John Bowen with a party of forty-eight found the first settlement in Van Diemen's Land near the River Derwent.
- 9 October – David Collins, on HMS Calcutta and Ocean, establishes the short-lived settlement at Sullivan Bay on Port Phillip

== Births ==
- 1 January – Daniel Egan, politician (died 1870)

== Deaths ==
- 26 August – Joseph Luker, police officer (born c. 1765)
- 16 September – Nicholas Baudin, French explorer (born 1754)
- 17 November – William Balmain, First Fleet surgeon (born 1762)
