= 1804 in Australia =

- Decades: 1780s; 1790s; 1800s; 1810s; 1820s
- See also: Other events of 1804; Timeline of Australian history

The following lists events that happened during 1804 in Australia.

== Incumbents ==
- Monarch – George III

=== Governors ===
Governors of the Australian colonies:

- Governor of New South Wales – Captain Philip King
- Lieutenant-Governor of Southern Van Diemen's Land – David Collins
- Lieutenant-Governor of Northern Van Diemen's Land – William Paterson

== Events ==
- 4 March – The Castle Hill convict rebellion, also known as the Battle of Vinegar Hill, takes place: 200 convicts, mostly Irish, rebel. Fifty-one convicts are punished, and nine hanged.
- 3 May – An Aboriginal food hunting party is attacked by settlers and soldiers at Risdon Cove. Eyewitness estimates of the death toll from the massacre vary from three or four to fifty.
- 16 September – A government-owned brewery is opened at Parramatta as a means of controlling the consumption of spirits.
- 4 November – In a letter to Sir Joseph Banks, Matthew Flinders recommends that the newly discovered country, New Holland, be renamed "Australia" or "Terra Australis" (from the Latin "australis" meaning "of the south").

== Exploration and settlement ==
- 15 February – Lieutenant-Governor David Collins lands at Risdon Cove in Van Diemen's Land (Tasmania). Unhappy with the area as a site for a settlement, Collins sends his surveyor, George Prideaux Harris, and harbour master William Collins in search of an alternative site. Harris and Collins recommend Sullivan's Cove.
- 24 March – The settlement at the Hunter River, also known as the Coal River, is officially named Newcastle.
- 8 May – Lieutenant-Governor Collins establishes the settlement at Sullivan's Cove on the River Derwent.
- 15 June – The name "Hobart Town", after the Colonial Secretary Lord Hobart, is adopted as the name for the new colony at Sullivan's Cove.
- 5 November – Lieutenant-Colonel William Paterson arrives at Outer Cove, leading the Buffalo, the Lady Nelson and two schooners, under instructions from London to form a settlement in the north of Van Diemen's Land.

== Births ==
- 5 October – Robert Campbell, politician (died 1859)

== Deaths ==
- 21 March – James Bloodsworth (born 1759), convict and bricklayer
- 27 December – George Barrington (born 1755), convict and police officer
