= 1790 in Australia =

- Decades: 1780s; 1790s; 1800s; 1810s
- See also: Other events of 1790; Timeline of Australian history

The following lists events that happened during 1790 in Australia.

== Leaders ==
- Monarch - George III
- Governor of New South Wales – Captain Arthur Phillip
- Lieutenant-Governor of Norfolk Island – Philip Gidley King
- Commanding officer of the colony's marine presence – Major Robert Ross

== Events ==
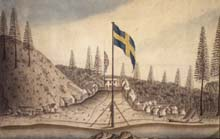
A watercolour painting of the Norfolk Island settlement c. 1790

- 28 February – John Irving becomes the first convict to be emancipated in New South Wales.
- 19 March – HMS Sirius, while transporting supplies to Norfolk Island, becomes wrecked and destroyed on a reef. This destroys many of the colony's supplies, and Phillip is again forced to introduce rationing to avoid famine.
- March – Following the loss of the Sirius, Lieutenant-Governor King returns to Britain to report on the difficulties of the settlements in New South Wales. Marine commander Robert Ross takes control of Norfolk Island in his absence, and under his harsh rule the condition on the island deteriorates.
- 17 April – In order to replenish the supplies lost with the Sirius, Phillip sends the colony's only remaining ship (HMS Supply) to Batavia.
- 3 May – Bennelong escapes.
- 3 June – The Lady Juliana arrives in Port Jackson – the first ship to land on Australian soil since the First Fleet. Much to the colonists' despair, she contains no fresh supplies, only more convicts.
- 20 June – The Second Fleet arrives in Port Jackson with much needed supplies. It also carries 759 new convicts and the first detachment of the New South Wales Corps.
- July – The first census taken in the colonies reveals the population of NSW to be 1,715 and Norfolk Island to be 524.
- 7 September – Governor Arthur Phillip is speared in the shoulder while speaking with a group of Indigenous Australians, due to a misunderstanding. Acting as interpreter, Bennelong prevents the situation from escalating and the Aboriginal people are permitted to leave in peace.
- 18 October – HMS Supply returns from Batavia with more supplies.

== Births ==
- 12 March – Edward Charles Close, New South Wales colonial magistrate (d. 1866)
- 28 March – John Wollaston, Western Australian settler and Anglican clergyman (d. 1856)
- 1 May – James Hurtle Fisher, South Australian pioneer (d. 1875)
- 26 May – James Clow, Presbyterian minister and settler (d. 1861)
- 1 June – Joseph Anderson, Norfolk Island administrator (d. 1877)
- 13 August – William Wentworth, explorer and politician (d. 1872)
- 8 November – John Dibbs, mariner (d. 1872)
- date unknown
  - William Allen, joint founder of St Peter's College, Adelaide (d. 1856)
  - Saxe Bannister, first Attorney General of New South Wales (d. 1877)
  - Andrew Bent, newspaper proprietor (d. 1851)
  - Thomas Bock, artist (d. 1855)
  - Foster Fyans, first mayor of Geelong (d. 1870)
  - Joshua Gregory, Western Australian settler (d. 1838)
  - Henry Hellyer, Van Diemen's Land explorer (d. 1832)
  - Isaac Nathan, composer (d. 1864)
  - John Joseph Therry, Catholic priest (d. 1864)

== Deaths ==
- 31 March – Arthur Bowes Smyth, First Fleet surgeon (b. 1750)
