= 1875 in Australia =

- Decades: 1850s; 1860s; 1870s; 1880s; 1890s
- See also: Other events of 1875; Timeline of Australian history

The following lists events that happened during 1875 in Australia.

== Incumbents ==
- Monarch - Victoria

=== Governors ===
Governors of the Australian colonies:

- Governor of New South Wales – Hercules Robinson, 1st Baron Rosmead
- Governor of Queensland – Sir William Cairns
- Governor of South Australia – Sir Anthony Musgrave
- Governor of Tasmania – Frederick Weld
- Governor of Victoria – Sir George Bowen
- Governor of Western Australia – The Hon. Sir Frederick Weld GCMG, then Sir William Robinson GCMG.

=== Premiers ===
Premiers of the Australian colonies:

- Premier of New South Wales – Henry Parkes until 8 February, then John Robertson
- Premier of Queensland – Arthur Macalister
- Premier of South Australia – Arthur Blyth until 8 June, then James Boucaut
- Premier of Tasmania – Alfred Kennerley
- Premier of Victoria –
  - until 7 August – George Kerferd
  - 7 August - 20 October – Graham Berry
  - starting 20 October – James McCulloch

== Events ==
- 11 January – William Robinson arrives in Western Australia to become Governor of the colony.
- 13 January – Frederick Weld becomes Governor of Tasmania.
- 23 January – William Cairns becomes Governor of Queensland.
- 9 February – John Robertson becomes Premier of New South Wales, replacing Henry Parkes.
- 24 February – The SS Gothenburg strikes Old Reef off Ayr, Queensland and sinks with the loss of 102 lives.
- 24 May – J. V. Mulligan and party discover the Barron River in Queensland, they left Cooktown on 17 April
- 6 May – Ernest Giles and party leave South Australia for an overland expedition to Perth, they arrive on 10 November.
- 3 June – Premier of South Australia Arthur Blyth resigns and is replaced by James Boucaut.
- 7 August – Graham Berry becomes Premier of Victoria.
- 20 October – James McCulloch becomes Premier of Victoria for the fourth time.
- 24 December – 59 die when a cyclone destroys the pearling fleet in the Exmouth Gulf of Western Australia.
- Undated -
  - Between 80 and 100 Arrernte (formerly known as Aranda) men, women and children are killed by a raiding party of 50 to 60 Matuntara warriors in the massacre of Running Waters.
  - The 1875–1876 Australia scarlet fever epidemic begins in Victoria.

== Arts and literature ==
- New South Government establishes an art gallery in Sydney; it later becomes the Art Gallery of New South Wales.

== Sport ==
- Polo played for the first time in Australia at Albert Park in Victoria
- Soccer played for the first time in Australia at Goodna in New South Wales.
- Wollomai wins the Melbourne Cup; the cup was held on the first Tuesday in November for this first time this year

== Births ==
- 20 March – Benjamin Fuller, theatrical entrepreneur (died 1952)
- 29 April – Margaret Preston, painter and printmaker (died 1963)
- 22 July – Leslie James Wrigley, academic, school inspector, principal, and teacher (died 1933)
- 3 December – Max Meldrum, painter (died 1955)

== Deaths ==
- 28 January – James Hurtle Fisher, South Australian pioneer (born 1790)
- 25 February – Thomas Reynolds, premier of South Australia (born 1818)
- 25 February – James Stokes Millner, medical practitioner (born 1830)
- 10 September – Silas Gill, Methodist preacher
- 20 October – Charles Cowper, premier of New South Wales (born 1807)
- 9 November – William Hovell, explorer (born 1786)
- 2 December – Charles La Trobe, lieutenant-governor of Victoria (born 1801)

Unknown date

- Henry Willey Reveley, Swan River Colony civil engineer (born 1788)
