= 1789 in Australia =

- Decades: 1780s; 1790s; 1800s
- See also: Other events of 1789; Timeline of Australian history

The following lists events that happened during 1789 in Australia.

== Leaders ==
- Monarch - George III
- Governor of New South Wales – Captain Arthur Phillip
- Governor of Norfolk Island – Philip Gidley King
- Commanding officer of the colony's marine presence – Major Robert Ross

== Events ==
- January – A convict uprising on Norfolk Island is easily crushed.
- April – An outbreak of smallpox at the Sydney Cove settlement kills many local Eora Aboriginals, including Arabanoo.
- 29 April – The Mutiny on the Bounty occurs; Captain William Bligh and 18 others are cast adrift.
- 4 June – The first Government House is completed.
- 4 June – Australia's first theatrical performance The Recruiting Officer by George Farquhar staged with convicts acting in the roles.
- 12 June – Phillip leads an expedition to Broken Bay (departed from Sydney on the 6th), and discovers the Hawkesbury River.
- 27 June – Captain Watkin Tench and party discover the Nepean River
- 22 September – (Today's New South Wales) Commonly cited as the first white child or the first white female born in Australia, Rebecca Small (22 September 1789 – 30 January 1883), was born in Port Jackson, the eldest daughter of John Small a boatswain in the First Fleet which arrived at Botany Bay in January 1788.
- 5 October – The first ship built in the colony, Rose Hill Packet, begins service on the Parramatta River.
- 21 November – James Ruse, a convict, provisionally given land at Parramatta to establish Experiment Farm.
- 25 November – For the purposes of understanding Aboriginal culture, Phillip captures Bennelong and Colebec.
- December – First successful harvest at Parramatta

== Births ==
- 19 January – Madame Rens, New South Wales settler and merchant (d. 1873)
- 16 March – Jared Davys, Administrator of Victoria (d. 1872)
- 1 May – George Fife Angas, Businessman and politician (d. 1879)
- 29 September – Benjamin Carvosso, first Wesleyan minister to preach in Australia (d. 1854)
- November – Peter Miller Cunningham, naval surgeon and author (d. 1864)
- 5 November – William Bland, Medical practitioner, surgeon and politician (d. 1868)
- date unknown
  - John Bateman, Fremantle pioneer, merchant and whaler (d. 1855)
  - Prosper de Mestre, merchant (d. 1844)
  - Michael Fenton, first Speaker of the Tasmanian House of Assembly (d. 1874)
  - Thomas Gilbert, South Australian pioneer (d. 1873)
  - Robert Menli Lyon, Aboriginal advocate (d. 1874)

== Deaths ==
- 18 May – Arabanoo, cultural mediator between the British settlers and Eora Aboriginals
- December – George Austin, gardener on HMS Guardian
- December – James Smith, gardener on HMS Guardian
