= 1874 in Australia =

- Decades: 1850s; 1860s; 1870s; 1880s; 1890s
- See also: Other events of 1874; Timeline of Australian history

The following lists events that happened during 1874 in Australia.

== Incumbents ==
=== Governors ===
Governors of the Australian colonies:

- Governor of New South Wales – Hercules Robinson, 1st Baron Rosmead
- Governor of Queensland – George Phipps, 2nd Marquess of Normanby
- Governor of South Australia – Sir Anthony Musgrave
- Governor of Tasmania – Charles Du Cane
- Governor of Victoria – Sir George Bowen
- Governor of Western Australia – The Hon. Sir Frederick Weld GCMG.

=== Premiers ===
Premiers of the Australian colonies:

- Premier of New South Wales – Sir Henry Parkes
- Premier of Queensland – Arthur Hunter Palmer until 7 January, then Arthur Macalister
- Premier of South Australia – John Hart until 10 November, then Arthur Blyth
- Premier of Tasmania – Alfred Kennerley
- Premier of Victoria – Charles Gavan Duffy until 31 July, then George Kerferd

== Events ==
- 8 January – Arthur Macalister becomes Premier of Queensland for the third time.
- 10 March – Ernest Giles is the first European to explore and later names (12 March) the Petermann Ranges.
- 1 April – John Forrest leads an expedition from Geraldton, Western Australia across the Gibson Desert to the Peake telegraph station in South Australia.
- 15 June – Brisbane's first Victoria Bridge opens; it is lost in the 1893 Brisbane flood.
- 31 July – George Kerferd becomes Premier of Victoria.
- 28 September – Victorian Humane Society established; it later becomes the Royal Humane Society of Australasia.
- 6 November – University of Adelaide established by act of the South Australian Parliament; it opened in 1876.

== Arts and literature ==
- Marcus Clarke's For the Term of his Natural Life is published in book form

== Sport ==
- Southern Rugby Union is established; renamed New South Wales Rugby Union in 1892
- Haricot wins the Melbourne Cup

== Births ==
- 2 March – Gregan McMahon, actor and theatre director (d. 1941)
- 3 March – Ada Crossley, singer (d. 1929
- 17 September – Walter Murdoch, essayist (d. 1970)
- 23 September – Ethel Ambrose, medical missionary (d. 1934 in Poona)
- 17 October – Sir Lionel Lindsay, painter (d. 1961)

== Deaths ==
- 1 February – Alexander Harris, soldier, teacher and author (b. 1805)
- 6 April – Michael Fenton, first Speaker of the Tasmanian House of Assembly (b. 1789)
- 17 May – Sir Roger Therry, jurist (b. 1800)
- date unknown
  - Robert Menli Lyon, Aboriginal advocate (b. 1789)
