= 1788 in Australia =

- Decades: 1780s; 1790s; 1800s
- See also: Other events of 1788; Timeline of Australian history

The following lists events that happened during 1788 in Australia.

== Leaders ==
- Monarch – George III
- Governor of New South Wales – Captain Arthur Phillip
- Lieutenant-Governor of Norfolk Island – Philip Gidley King
- Commanding officer of the colony's marine presence – Major Robert Ross

== Events ==
- 18 January – Captain Arthur Phillip arrives in Botany Bay with the lead ship of the First Fleet, HMS Supply.
- 19 January – Alexander, Friendship and Scarborough, convict transports of First Fleet arrive Botany Bay.
- 20 January – Final ships of First Fleet, the convict transports Charlotte, Lady Penrhyn and Prince of Wales with the supply transports Borrowdale, Fishburn and Golden Grove escorted by HMS Sirius arrive in Botany Bay.
- 24 January – The La Perouse expedition in the Astrolabe and Boussole arrive at Botany Bay.
- 26 January – After Botany Bay was decided unsuitable for settlement, the First Fleet sails to Port Jackson and lands at Sydney Cove to establish a settlement (which becomes Sydney).
- 6 February – The first female convicts disembark at Port Jackson.
- 9 February – The Colony of New South Wales is formally proclaimed, with Phillip sworn in as Captain-General and Governor-in-Chief.
- 14 February – HMS Supply leaves Sydney Cove to establish a settlement on Norfolk Island.
- 18 February – Lord Howe Island is discovered by Lieutenant Henry Lidgbird Ball on HMS Supply.
- 27 February – A convict, Thomas Barrett, receives the first death sentence in the colony.
- 6 March – Lieutenant Philip Gidley King establishes a settlement on Norfolk Island with a party of fifteen convicts and seven men.
- 10 March – The La Perouse expedition leaves Botany Bay for New Caledonia, disappeared at sea.
- 15 April – Phillip explores northwards to Manly, and sights the Blue Mountains.
- 23 April – Governor Phillip explores the area now known as Parramatta, west of Sydney.
- 5 May – Charlotte, Lady Penrhyn and Scarborough set sail for China.
- 29 May – Two convicts are killed by Aboriginals at Rushcutters Bay; Phillip leads a punitive attack on the Aborigines on 31 May.
- 5 June – All the settlement's cattle brought from Cape Town escape; they are not recaptured until November 1795.
- 14 July – Borrowdale, Alexander, Friendship and Prince of Wales set sail to return to England.
- 21 July – First sitting of the Court of Civil Jurisdiction.
- September – Sydney's first road, from the Governor's House to Dawes Point, is completed.
- 2 October – Captain John Hunter takes HMS Sirius to the Cape of Good Hope to pick up supplies.
- 2 November – A second settlement is established at Rose Hill, which will later become Parramatta.
- 19 November – Fishburn and Golden Grove set sail for England.

== Births ==
- 4 January – Johann Menge, South Australian explorer and geologist (d. 1852)
- 16 January – Hannibal Hawkins Macarthur, New South Wales politician and businessman (d. 1861)
- 17 April – Charles Hervey Bagot, South Australian pastoralist, mine owner and parliamentarian (d. 1880)
- 22 May – William Broughton, bishop (d. 1853)
- 2 August – Charles Hardwicke, Tasmanian explorer (d. 1880)
- 24 August – Osmond Gilles, South Australian colonial treasurer (d. 1866)
- 24 October – John Burdett Wittenoom, Swan River Colony clergyman (d. 1855)
- date unknown
  - Charles Fraser, botanist (d. 1831)
  - Frederick Goulburn, first Colonial Secretary of New South Wales (d. 1837)
  - John Ovens, explorer (d. 1825)
  - Thomas Pamphlett, convict and castaway (d. 1838)
  - Henry Willey Reveley, Swan River Colony civil engineer (d. 1875)
  - Edward Buckley Wynyard, New South Wales politician (d. 1864)

== Deaths ==
- 17 February – Louis Receveur, astronomer-priest, member of the French La Perouse expedition (b. c. 1757)
- 27 February – Thomas Barrett, convict and the first person executed under British law in Australia (b. c. 1758)
- 5 June – Ruth Bowyer, convict (b. c. 1761)
