= New South Wales General Standing Orders =

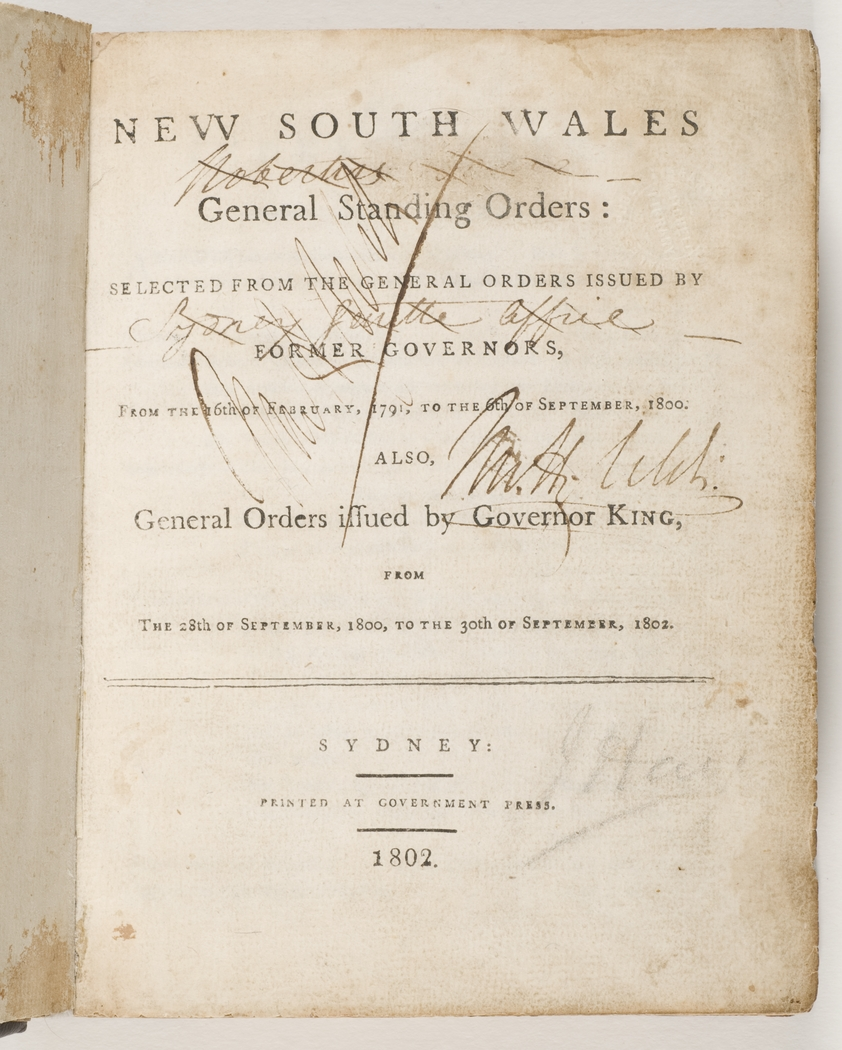
Book of orders. Selected from the General Orders issued by Former Governors, from 16 February 1791 to 6 September 1800: Also, General Orders issued by Governor King, from the 28 September 1800 to 30 September 1802.

The New South Wales General Standing Orders was the first compilation of government orders and notices intended to inform colonists of the law as it stood in 1802 after the arrival of the First Fleet. It was the first book to be printed in Australia.

== Publication history ==
In 1802 Governor Philip Gidley King instructed the government printer, George Howe, to print a selection of General Orders issued from 1791 to 1802 in a single book. The book was printed at Government Press in Sydney. The orders were indexed by subject to assist locating an order due to the large number of orders included.

Governor King selected almost 800 orders issued by former Governors of the colony as well as himself to be included in the book. A wide range of areas were covered by the selected orders, from "the punishment of restless and turbulent characters" to the "quantity of wheat to be demanded for a loaf". Governor King's decision to compile and print these orders was to establish an effective means of circulation for government orders and notices. As orders were previously circulated irregularly, the publication would satisfy officials' protests about the inadequate access and not allow colonists to continue with their claims of ignorance about them. It has been argued that the impact of print "was gradually to transform the nature and perception of authority among colonists."

After the book was printed, all future general orders were published in the Sydney Gazette, which was also printed by George Howe.

== Extant copies ==
There are three copies known to be still in existence. The State Library of New South Wales and The British Library both hold a copy in their collections.

A facsimile of the book was printed by History Books Australia, Black Rock, Victoria in 1983. The reprint was limited to 150 copies and 25 presentation copies.
