= 1877 in Australia =

- Decades: 1850s; 1860s; 1870s; 1880s; 1890s
- See also: Other events of 1877; Timeline of Australian history

The following events happened in Australia in the year 1877.

== Incumbents ==
=== Governors ===
Governors of the Australian colonies:

- Governor of New South Wales – Hercules Robinson, 1st Baron Rosmead
- Governor of Queensland – Sir William Cairns until 14 March, then Arthur Kennedy
- Governor of South Australia – Sir Anthony Musgrave until 29 January, then William Jervois
- Governor of Tasmania – Frederick Weld
- Governor of Victoria – Sir George Bowen
- Governor of Western Australia – Sir William Robinson GCMG, then Major General The Hon. Sir Harry Ord GCMG CB RE

=== Premiers ===
Premiers of the Australian colonies:

- Premier of New South Wales –
  - until 21 March: John Robertson
  - 21 March-16 August: Henry Parkes
  - 17 August-17 December: John Robertson
  - starting 17 December: James Farnell
- Premier of Queensland – George Thorn until 8 March, then John Douglas
- Premier of South Australia – John Colton until 26 October, then James Boucaut
- Premier of Tasmania – Thomas Reibey until 9 August, then Philip Fysh
- Premier of Victoria – James McCulloch

== Events ==
- 8 March – John Douglas becomes Premier of Queensland
- 10 March – Cloncurry was established
- 15 March to 4 April – 1877 Australia v England series is played
- 1 April – A settlement on Thursday Island was established for the refueling of steam ships
- 8 June – Lutherans found the Hermannsburg Mission at Finke River in the Northern Territory
- 20 July – Arthur Kennedy becomes Governor of Queensland
- 9 August – Philip Fysh becomes Premier of Tasmania
- 17 August – John Robertson begins another term as Premier of New South Wales
- 11 September – Ships Avalanche and Forrest collide off Portland, Victoria, only 3 of the 107 passengers are saved
- 2 October – William Jervois becomes Governor of South Australia
- 26 October – James Boucaut becomes Premier of South Australia
- 12 November – Harry Ord becomes Governor of Western Australia
- 8 December – Telegraph line between Western Australia and South Australia completed, linking Western Australia to the east coast by telegraphy for the first time, via Adelaide.

== Arts and literature ==
Marie Gavotte 1877 by Herbert Hedwan Chandler
MIDI version

== Sport ==
- 30 April – South Australian Football League founded.
- 17 May – Victorian Football Association founded.

== Births ==
- 17 January – May Gibbs
- 25 August – John Latham
- 8 October – Hans Heysen
- 14 November – Norman Brookes

== Deaths ==
- 25 March – Caroline Chisholm, humanitarian (b. 1808)
- 2 April – Bully Hayes, ship's captain and trader
- 7 April – John Arthur, Tasmanian cricketer (b. 1847)
- 16 June – John Fairfax, journalist and politician (b. 1804)
- 18 July – Joseph Anderson, Norfolk Island administrator (b. 1790)
- 17 August – Martin Cash, convict escapee (born 1808)
- 16 September – Saxe Bannister, first Attorney General of New South Wales (b. 1790)
