= Leslie James Wrigley =

Academic, college head and teacher

Leslie James Wrigley (22 July 1875 – 12 July 1933) was an Australian academic, school inspector, school principal, schoolteacher, teacher training college head and teacher training college teacher.

== Early life ==
Wrigley was born on 22 July 1874 in Richmond, Melbourne, Australia, the son of bookbinder James Wrigley and his wife Sarah Jane (née Bedggood). Both his parents were born in England. Wrigley attended the local primary school and graduated with honours from the University of Melbourne. He taught at a handful of private schools in Victoria before graduating from the London Day Training College with a diploma of pedagogy in 1904. He was also educated at the University of Jena in Germany. Following a stint as a lecturer at Bangor College in Wales, Wrigley returned to Melbourne in 1907 and became senior master of modern colleges at Wesley College.

== Career ==
Wrigley married English-born Florence Adelaide Willmoth on 4 April 1908 at a Methodist church in Elsternwick. He joined the Education Department a year later and became principal of the University Practising School (later University High School) which began operations in 1910. He also served as vice-principal of the Melbourne Teaching College. Wrigley resigned from University High in December 1914 to become a secondary school inspector. Wrigley became president of the Melbourne Teaching College in February 1927, as well as its professor and dean of education a few months later.

== Death ==
On 24 July 1932, Wrigley was involved in a car accident which left him with a significant thigh-bone injury. He died on 12 July 1933 at the Bethesda private hospital in Richmond; the cause of death was postoperative pneumonia. His funeral was held at Queen's College chapel and he was buried in Springvale cemetery.
