= 1876 in Australia =

- Decades: 1850s; 1860s; 1870s; 1880s; 1890s
- See also: Other events of 1889; Timeline of Australian history

The following lists events that happened during 1876 in Australia.

== Incumbents ==
=== Governors ===
Governors of the Australian colonies:

- Governor of New South Wales – Hercules Robinson, 1st Baron Rosmead
- Governor of Queensland – Sir William Cairns
- Governor of South Australia – Sir Anthony Musgrave
- Governor of Tasmania – Frederick Weld
- Governor of Victoria – Sir George Bowen
- Governor of Western Australia – Sir William Robinson GCMG.

=== Premiers ===
Premiers of the Australian colonies:

- Premier of New South Wales – John Robertson
- Premier of Queensland – Arthur Macalister until 5 June, then George Thorn
- Premier of South Australia – James Boucaut until 6 June, then John Colton
- Premier of Tasmania – Alfred Kennerley until 20 July, then Thomas Reibey
- Premier of Victoria – James McCulloch

== Events ==
- 16 February – The community of Bowen was struck by an F5 tornado that caused £7000 of damage, injured numerous people and had one confirmed casualty.
- 20 February – Submarine cable between New South Wales and New Zealand completed.
- 21 March – J.V. Mulligan finds gold deposits in the Hodgkinson River in Queensland.
- 28 March – Classes commence at the University of Adelaide.
- 18 March – Luigi d'Albertis leaves Australia to explore New Guinea.
- 18–19 April – Catalpa rescue; Rescue team sent from New Bedford, Massachusetts, USA by John Devoy, rescues six escaped Fenian prisoners from Fremantle, Western Australia
- 5 June – George Thorn becomes Premier of Queensland.
- 6 June – John Colton becomes Premier of South Australia.
- 5 July – The completion of a railway bridge across the Brisbane River links Brisbane and Ipswich, Queensland.
- 20 July – Thomas Reibey becomes Premier of Tasmania
- 11 September – SS Dandenong sinks; 40 lives are lost.
- 7 November – The Melbourne Cup is run for the first time on the first Tuesday of November
- 27 November – Legislation is enacted in Queensland creating the first public fire service in Australia.
- 1 December – SS Georgette runs aground near Busselton, Western Australia; Grace Bussell and Sam Isaacs help to rescue the passengers.

== Births ==
- 9 May – Oliver Uppill
- 7 September – C. J. Dennis
- 10 September – Hugh D. McIntosh
- 18 September – James Scullin
- 23 September – Cyril Brudenell White
- 24 September – Arthur Hennessy
- 4 October – Hugh McCrae
- 24 November – Walter Burley Griffin
- 21 December – J. T. Lang

=== Unknown date ===
- Ambrose Dyson, also known as Amb Dyson, illustrator and political cartoonist (died 1913)

== Deaths ==
- 22 January – George Dalrymple
- 8 March – Truganini
- 5 April – William Spain, first New South Wales Inspector-General of Police
- 24 May – Henry Kingsley
- 10 June – Kenneth Brown, an explorer and pastoralist in Western Australia. He was hanged in 1876 for murdering his second wife Mary Ann Brown.
- 29 August – John Skinner Prout
