= Norfolk (1798 sloop) =

New South Wales colony sloop

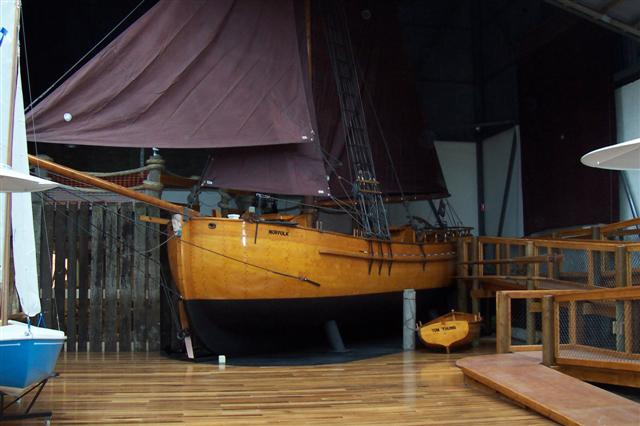
- A replica of Norfolk

History

Great Britain
- Name: Norfolk
- Launched: 1798
- Fate: Wrecked 1800

General characteristics
- Tons burthen: 25 (bm)

The Colonial sloop Norfolk was built on Norfolk Island in 1798. It was wrecked in 1800.

David Collins recorded in his Account of the English Colony in New South Wales: "The necessity of a vessel to keep up a more frequent intercourse with Norfolk Island, ...having been much felt by the want of various stores ...occasioned Captain Townson, the Commanding officer, to construct a small decked boat, sloop rigged, in which he sent His letters to this port..." Cumpston describes Norfolk as, “A decked longboat built at Norfolk I[sland].”

Governor Hunter put the Norfolk under the command of Matthew Flinders, the Sailing Master Peter Hibbs (seaman formerly on the "Sirius"). The vessel was to be used as a survey vessel and in that capacity was used by Flinders and Bass in 1798-99 to circumnavigate Van Diemen's Land (Tasmania) – proving the existence of Bass Strait. Flinders also took Norfolk north to chart Cook's Morton's Bay (now Moreton Bay) and Hervey's Bay (Hervey Bay).

It has been speculated that it was unlikely that they used Norfolk Island pine as the timber was said to be useless in water, and that it was most likely constructed of timbers from existing boats on the island, perhaps also using surviving timbers from HMS Sirius, but Collins said: “The vessel that has the credit of having first circumnavigated Van Diemen’s land was built at Norfolk Island, on the fir of that country, which was found to answer extremely well”.

Norfolk was then used to supply produce from the Windsor Area to Port Jackson, until 1800 when convicts seized her at the mouth of the Hawkesbury River. Intending to sail her to Maluku, the convicts ran her aground at what was later called "Pirate Point" on the northern side of the mouth to the Hunter River. Today, the point is in the suburb of Stockton.

== Replica ==
In 1998–99 Bern Cuthbertson OAM from Sandy Bay, Tasmania, re-enacted all of Norfolk's journeys in a replica vessel, constructed of Tasmania Huon and Celery Top pines. The replica Norfolk is now on display at The Bass and Flinders Centre in George Town on Tasmania's Tamar River.

A limited amount of sterling silver and 18-carat gold medallions were hand-made to commemorate the voyages of Bern Cuthbertson's Norfolk. These medallions were mainly given to those that sailed with Bern.

In 2000 the Queensland Place Names Board named Norfolk Point (27.4508°S 153.1914°E) which was on reclaimed land in the Manly boat harbour in Moreton Bay in honour of Matthew Flinders and the replica's visit. A plaque on the point commemorates the naming.

== Affiliations ==
- TS Norfolk, Australian Navy Cadets
