= Francis Grose (British Army officer) =

British army officer and colonial administrator (1758–1814)

Lieutenant-General Francis Grose
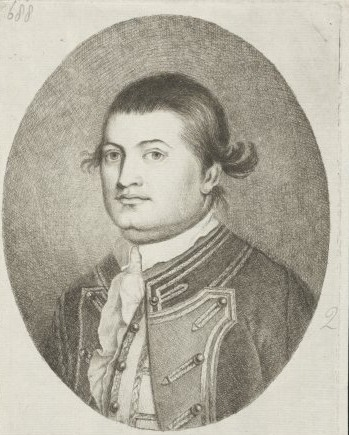
- Grose as a captain
- Born: 1758; Greenford, Middlesex, England
- Died: 8 May 1814 (aged 56); Croydon, Surrey, England
- Military career
- Allegiance: United Kingdom
- Branch: 52nd Regiment of Foot; 85th Regiment of Foot; New South Wales Corps
- Rank: Lieutenant-General
- Other work: Lieutenant Governor of New South Wales

Lieutenant-General Francis Grose (1758 – 8 May 1814) was a British soldier who commanded the New South Wales Corps. As Lieutenant Governor of New South Wales he governed the colony from 1792 until 1794, in which he established military rule, abolished civil courts, and made generous land-grants to his officers. He failed to stamp out the practice of paying wages in alcoholic spirits, with consequent public drunkenness and corruption. Although he helped to improve living conditions to some degree, he was not viewed as a successful administrator.

== Early life ==
Francis Grose was born in 1758 in England. He was the eldest son of Francis Grose (the well-known English antiquary) and Catherine Jordan. Grose received a commission as an ensign in 1775, in the 52nd Foot and was promoted to lieutenant later that year. Grose served during the American Revolutionary War, where he was twice wounded (at the assaults on Fort Montgomery and Monmouth Court House). Returning to England in 1779 as captain of the 85th Regiment of Foot, he acted as recruiting officer.

== New South Wales ==
Grose did not leave England until late in 1791, arriving in Sydney on 14 February 1792 on board the convict transport Pitt. The voyage was not an easy one as fever killed a large number of people on board, seaman, soldiers, convicts, wives, and children.

Grose became colonial administrator when Governor Arthur Phillip, whose health had been poor for some time (probably due to poor diet), received permission to depart. The European population of New South Wales when Grose took over was 4,221, of whom 3,099 were convicts.

Grose immediately abandoned Phillip's plans for governing the colony. A staunch military man, he established military rule and set out to secure the authority of the Corps. He abolished the civilian courts and transferred the magistrates to the authority of Captain Joseph Foveaux. After the poor crops of 1793 he cut the rations of the convicts but not those of the Corps, overturning Phillip's policy of equal rations for all.

In a connived attempt to improve agricultural production and make the colony more self-sufficient, Grose turned away from collective farming and made generous land grants to officers of the Corps. They were also provided with government-fed and clothed convicts as farm labour, whose products they would sell to the government store at a good profit.

During his tenure, the Spanish expedition led by Alexando Malaspina visited the colony, 11 March to 11 April 1793.

== Final years and death ==
Grose's first wife died 12 January 1813. On 28 March 1814, he married Elizabeth, widow of William Paterson. A month later, on 8 May 1814, he died in Croydon, Surrey, England. His burial record shows that he was 56 years old at time of burial. Elizabeth died in Liverpool, England on 14 May 1839. The Grose Valley, one of the most spectacular regions in the Blue Mountains on the edge of Sydney, is named after Francis Grose.

Government offices
Preceded by Robert Ross	Lieutenant Governor of New South Wales; 1792 - 1794	Succeeded by William Paterson
