= William Paterson (explorer) =

Scottish soldier and botanist in Tasmania

Colonel William Paterson FRS
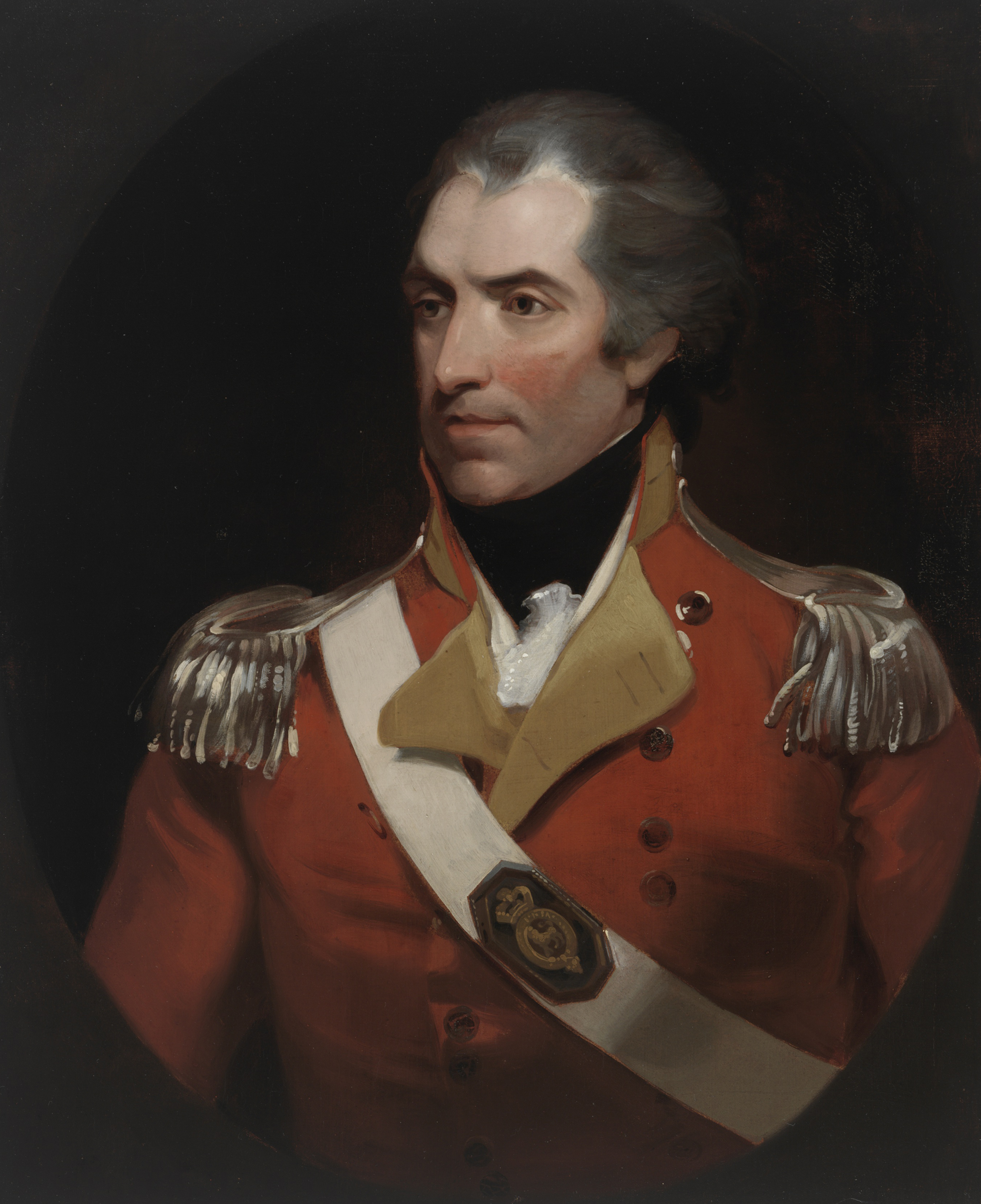

1st Commandant at Port Dalrymple
- In office 16 February 1804 – 24 March 1808
- Succeeded by: John Brabyn

Lieutenant Governor of New South Wales
- In office 13 December 1794 – 1 September 1795
- Preceded by: Francis Grose
- Succeeded by: Office Vacant
- In office 24 March 1806 – 26 January 1808
- Preceded by: Office Vacant
- Succeeded by: George Johnston

Personal details
- Born: 17 August 1755 Montrose, Scotland
- Died: 21 June 1810 (aged 54) At sea aboard HMS Dromedary off Cape Horn
- Spouse: Elizabeth Driver

Military service
- Allegiance: United Kingdom
- Branch/service: British Army
- Years of service: 1781–1810
- Rank: Colonel
- Unit: 98th Regiment of Foot; 73rd Regiment of Foot
- Commands: New South Wales Corps
- Scientific career
- Author abbrev. (botany): Paterson

Colonel William Paterson, FRS (17 August 1755 – 21 June 1810) was a Scottish soldier, explorer, Lieutenant Governor and botanist best known for leading early settlement at Port Dalrymple in Tasmania.

== Early years ==
A native of Montrose, Scotland, Paterson was interested in botany as a boy and trained in horticulture at Syon in London. Paterson was sent to the Cape Colony by the wealthy and eccentric Countess of Strathmore to collect plants, he arrived in Table Bay on board the "Houghton" in May 1777. He made four trips into the interior between May 1777 and March 1780, when he departed. In 1789 Paterson published Narrative of Four Journeys into the Country of the Hottentots and Caffraria, (Note: Hottentot is a now deprecated term referring to the people of the Western Cape of South Africa, while Caffraria referred to the Eastern Cape.) which he dedicated to Sir Joseph Banks.

== Career ==
Paterson was originally commissioned as an ensign in the 98th Regiment of Foot and served in India. He later transferred to the 73rd Regiment of Foot after the 98th's disbandment in 1787. In 1789, he was promoted to captain in the New South Wales Corps, serving under Major Francis Grose. After some time spent recruiting, he arrived in Sydney in October 1791. From November 1791 until March 1793 he served in command on Norfolk Island. Whilst there he collected botanical, geological and insect specimens and sent them to Banks. He also provided seed to the Lee and Kennedy and Colvill nurseries. He was elected a Fellow of the Royal Society in May 1798.

In 1794 he served for a year as Lieutenant Governor of New South Wales. In 1800 he was re-appointed to the post and served a second term until 1808.

In May 1795, following the killing of two unarmed settlers, Paterson ordered a party of corps to the area:

destroy as many (Aboriginal Australians) as they could meet with ... in the hope of striking terror, to erect gibbets in different places, whereon the bodies of all they might kill were to be hung ...

Seven or eight Bediagal people were allegedly killed, although their bodies were never found, it is possible they had been recovered by the Bediagal people. A crippled man, some children and five women were taken to Sydney as prisoners. The crippled man, escaped. One of the women had sustained a gunshot wound to her shoulder, her weaning child was also injured. The child died not long after arriving at the settlement. One of the women delivered a child while in custody, unfortunately her newborn son died shortly after the birth. The remaining children along with all of the women where released.

Afterwards Patterson ordered the soldiers withdraw from the area, soon after the Bediagal people attacked another farm, and put an unarmed settler and his son to death: after having seen her husband and her child slaughtered, the wife and mother was then also seriously wounded in the attack. In consequence, another party of the corps was sent out; while they were there the Bediagal did not attack and remained at a distance. Patterson had no other choice than to assign the soldiers permanently to avoid the ongoing cycle of attack followed by reprisal.

In 1801, Paterson fought a duel with John Macarthur and was wounded in the shoulder. Macarthur was sent to England for court martial and Captain Neil McKellar was sent to England as witness and also carried Macarthur's sword as evidence. McKellar's ship Caroline was lost at Sea in 1802 and as a result the Patersons adopted his ten year-old daughter Elizabeth McKellar (b. Dec 1793) from the female orphan school in 1804.

Paterson led an expedition to the Hunter Region in 1801 and up the Paterson River (later named in his honour by Governor King). The expedition discovered coal in the area that would later become the vast South Maitland Coalfields; it was a discovery of great economic significance. In 1804 he was assigned to establish a new settlement at Port Dalrymple, at what is now Launceston Tasmania, exploring the Tamar River and going up the North Esk River farther than European had previously gone.

Between 1804 and 1808 Paterson was also appointed Commandant at Port Dalrymple, the administrator of the colony in the north of Van Diemen's Land. In 1806, Paterson's duties as commander of the New South Wales Corps required him to return to Sydney, but he went back to Van Diemen's Land in 1807, and stayed until December 1808. During this time he corresponded regularly with the eminent naturalist Sir Joseph Banks, sending a number of specimens.

The New South Wales Corps selected Paterson as acting Governor of New South Wales on 1 January 1809 after the deposition of Governor Captain William Bligh in the so-called "Rum Rebellion." He was replaced by the newly arrived Lachlan Macquarie by the end of the year. He left Sydney for England on 12 May 1810, but died on board HMS Dromedary while off Cape Horn just a few weeks later.

His widow Elizabeth married Francis Grose, Paterson's predecessor as Lieutenant Governor, in April 1814, but Grose died a month later. Elizabeth died in Liverpool, England in 1839.

The standard author abbreviation Paterson is used to indicate this person as the author when citing a botanical name.

== Bibliography ==
- Bladen, F. M., ed. (1978). Historical records of New South Wales. Vol. 2. Grose and Paterson, 1793-1795. Lansdown Slattery & Co. ISBN 978-0868330037.

Government offices
Preceded by Francis Grose	Lieutenant Governor of New South Wales; 1794–1795	Succeeded by Office vacant
Preceded by Office Vacant	Lieutenant Governor of New South Wales; 1800–1808	Succeeded by George Johnston
Preceded by New position	Commandant at Port Dalrymple; 1804–1808	Succeeded by John Brabyn
