= John Macarthur (colonial officer) =

British Army officer and landowner (1767–1834)

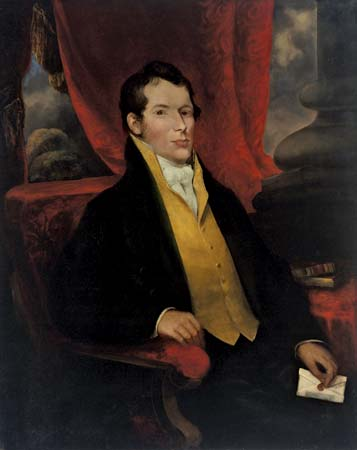
- Born: 1767; Stoke, Plymouth, England
- Died: 11 April 1834 (aged 66–67); Camden, New South Wales
- Spouse: Elizabeth Macarthur (m. 1788)
- Children: 8, including Edward, William and James
- Military career
- Allegiance: Great Britain (1782–1800); United Kingdom (1800–1805)
- Branch: British Army (1754–1763); British Army (1800–1805)
- Rank: Captain
- Unit: New South Wales Corps
- Conflicts: Rum Rebellion

John Macarthur (1767 – 11 April 1834) was a British Army officer, landowner, and politician, best remembered as a key organiser of the 1808 Rum Rebellion and a pioneer of the Australian Merino wool industry. Born in England, Macarthur joined the nascent New South Wales Corps in 1789; he quickly established himself as a particularly unscrupulous, volatile, and entrepreneurial member of the so-called 'Rum Corps'.

Macarthur imported the first Merino Sheep to New South Wales in 1797. His time in the colony was marked by frequent quarrels with other settlers, one of which resulted in his brief expulsion from the colony, but his wool cultivation became the cornerstone of a commercial empire. After disputes with Governor William Bligh, Macarthur orchestrated a coup against Bligh's rule. Despite serving in the military junta which arose from the Rum Rebellion, Macarthur avoided prosecution for mutiny in England, and returned to his profitable colonial landholdings in 1817. In commemoration of his contributions to the Australian wool industry, Macarthur was featured on the Australian two-dollar note from 1966 to 1988.

== Early life ==
John Macarthur was born at Stoke Damerel near Plymouth, England in 1767. His exact date of birth is unknown, but his baptism was registered on 3 September 1767. He was the second son of Alexander Macarthur, who had fled Scotland to the West Indies after the Jacobite rising of 1745 before returning to Plymouth to work as a linen draper and mercer.

In 1782, John Macarthur was commissioned as an ensign in Fish's Corps, a regiment of the British Army formed to serve in the American War of Independence. The war ended before the regiment was ready to sail and was disbanded in 1783. On half-pay, Macarthur went to live on a farm near Holsworthy in Devon, where he became interested in 'rural occupations' and contemplated a career in law. Instead, in April 1788, Macarthur returned to full-pay army duties, securing a commission as an ensign in the 68th Regiment of Foot, stationed at Gibraltar. In that same year, he married Elizabeth Veale of Bridgerule near Holsworthy.

== New South Wales Corps ==
In June 1789, Macarthur secured a lieutenancy with the New South Wales (NSW) Corps, a regiment formed to serve at the recently established convict outpost of Sydney. According to his wife, he had the "expectation of reaping the most material advantages" of being attached to an army regiment in the new colony. It has also been argued that he was driven by a desire to escape the financial and social embarrassment of being the son of a tailor.

=== The Second Fleet, duel with Captain Gilbert ===
John and Elizabeth Macarthur, with their infant son Edward, were subsequently enlisted to sail to Sydney with the NSW Corps and 1,006 convicts as part of the Second Fleet on board the Neptune. The Second Fleet became known as the 'Death Fleet' due to its organisation being managed by ex-slavers, resulting in 26% of the convicts dying during the voyage.

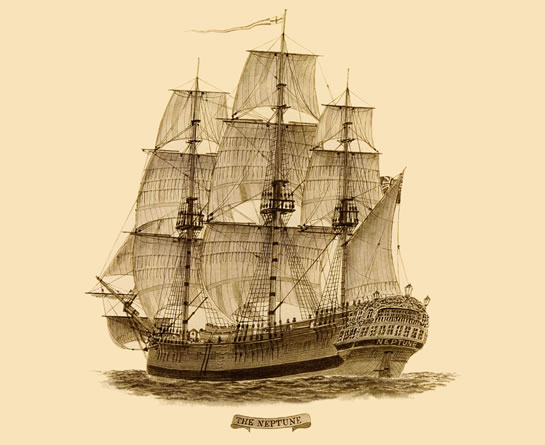
The Neptune of the Second Fleet

Before the Neptune had even departed the British Isles, Macarthur's 'passionate temper' that came to define much of his future career, saw him become involved in a heated disputation with the vessel's commander Captain Thomas Gilbert. An issue with the size of his cabin caused Macarthur to publicly denounce Gilbert as a great scoundrel and the two fought a duel with pistols on the Plymouth docks in which neither were injured. Macarthur's fellow NSW Corps officer on the ship was the brother of Evan Nepean, the Under-Secretary of State for the Home Department, and in a move that also became typical of Macarthur, he was aided by this political association to have Captain Gilbert replaced as master of the Neptune before the fleet's departure.

Despite the removal of Captain Gilbert, the cramped and squalid accommodation provided for his wife and infant son on board the Neptune provoked further disputes, with Macarthur successfully requesting half-way through the voyage that he and his family be transferred to another vessel of the fleet.

=== Arrival in Sydney, dispute with Governor Phillip ===
Macarthur arrived in Sydney in June 1790 where he lived with his family and was placed in charge of 60 soldiers. He became an important part of the trading cartel that the NSW Corps under Major Francis Grose established over produce that entered the port colony, in particular the monopoly of the liquor trade. When Governor Arthur Phillip ordered the return of a cask of spirits which Macarthur had taken from the government stores, Macarthur outright refused. Governor Phillip then threatened him with immediate arrest to which Macarthur demanded an explanation before later returning the cask. Macarthur refused to associate with Governor Phillip after this incident.

=== Increase in wealth and influence as part of the 'Rum Corps' ===
Governor Phillip left for England in late 1792, leaving the colony under the charge of the commander of the NSW Corps, Francis Grose. Under Grose, the officers of this regiment, including Macarthur strengthened their monopolistic control not only of the trade of spirits and food, but also of convict labour. The NSW Corps became known as the 'Rum Corps' due to their very profitable extortion of trade, especially spirits.

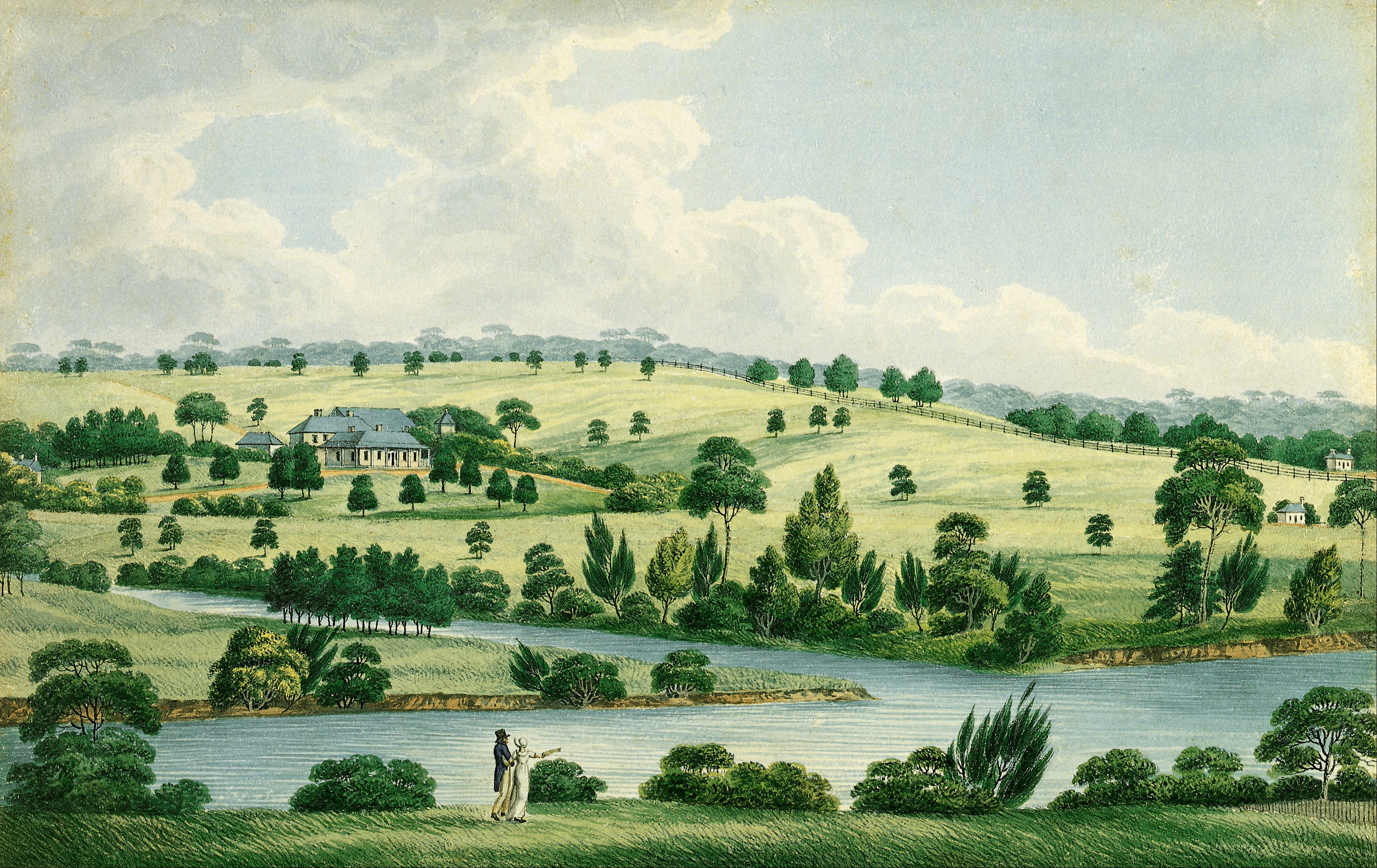
Painting of Elizabeth Farm by Joseph Lycett (c.1825)

Macarthur seems to have been a favoured racketeer of Grose who in February 1793 granted him 40 hectares (100 acres) of the best land in the colony at Rose Hill near Parramatta together with 40 convicts to labour on it. He was granted a further 40 hectares (100 acres) of adjoining land in April 1794. He named the property Elizabeth Farm in honour of his wife. Grose also gave Macarthur a valuable pregnant cow and the command of the outposts at Parramatta and Toongabbie. Grose also appointed him as paymaster for the regiment and as Inspector of Public Works, giving Macarthur almost complete control of the finances and administration of both the military and civil sections of the colony.

Grose was replaced as Lieutenant-Governor of New South Wales in 1794 by another 'Rum Corps' officer in Captain William Paterson. Under Paterson, Macarthur's influence increased further by being promoted to the rank of army captain. The tender for the supply of the soldiers' clothes in the colony was also given to his brother in Plymouth who ran the family's tailoring business. By 1795, Macarthur held some of the highest paying government positions in the colony, made profits of up to 500% on the extortion of trade and held 500 acres of land which produced goods that he sold to the government and other settlers at inflated prices, making him an extra £400 each year.

=== Power struggle with Governor Hunter ===
In 1795, Governor John Hunter arrived to take command of the colony from the interim military oligarchy of the 'Rum Corps' officers. Hunter began a process of reform by attempting to separate the military and civil functions, resulting in Macarthur being forced to resign from his position of Inspector of Public Works. Macarthur detested this loss of power and spearheaded a subversive campaign to discredit Hunter by writing letters to the British government claiming that the widespread drunkenness in Sydney was due to him despite it being widely regarded now as being due to the corrupt practices of the 'Rum Corps' officers.

Macarthur and the 'Rum Corps' retained control of the courts under Hunter and were also able to employ violent techniques of intimidation over people who wanted reform. When the chief-surgeon William Balmain called for an investigation into the violent assault of a civilian by Macarthur's soldiers, Macarthur humiliated him while the officers of the 'Rum Corps' threatened Balmain's life. Due to the legal system being under control of the 'Rum Corps', the assault and intimidation was not inquired into. Balmain viewed Macarthur as a 'base rascal and an atrocious liar and villain' over this incident.

Because of the machinations of Macarthur and the subsequent failure to reform the colony, Hunter was recalled as Governor in 1800 to England where he fought to restore his reputation from the allegations presented by Macarthur.

=== Acquisition of the first Merino sheep ===
During this period, Macarthur also pioneered the establishment of Merino wool production in the colony. In 1797, Captain Henry Waterhouse of HMS Reliance arrived in Sydney from the Cape Colony with eight Merino sheep purchased from the stock of the recently deposed Dutch governor. These were the first sheep of this breed to be introduced into New South Wales and of them, four ewes and two rams were 'favoured' to Macarthur who was a friend of Waterhouse. In order to advance the breeding of these sheep Macarthur later purchased a large parcel of land at Toongabbie from fellow 'Rum Corps' officer Joseph Foveaux.

=== Shooting of superior officer, arrest and removal from the colony ===
Governor Philip Gidley King replaced Hunter in September 1800 and was soon also to encounter Macarthur's scorn. In July 1801, King overturned a sentence of imprisonment against navy lieutenant James Marshall, who had been convicted of assaulting Macarthur by a court stacked with 'Rum Corps' officers. Macarthur saw this as an insult, and tried to organise the 'Rum Corps' officers to boycott Governor King. However, when his superior, Colonel Paterson, refused to co-operate, Macarthur used personal material to try to blackmail him. This resulted in Paterson challenging Macarthur to a duel in which Macarthur gave Paterson a severe wound by shooting him in the shoulder.

Governor King had Macarthur placed under house arrest, and realising that Macarthur would not be successfully tried in the colony's 'Rum Corps' dominated courts, decided to send him to England to face a court martial there. King also prepared an extensive volume of notes outlining Macarthur's history of transgressions in New South Wales to be sent to England with Macarthur to aid in convicting him. In this were documents showing how Macarthur had amassed a fortune of £20,000 through extortion and monopolisation. Despite this report being heavily guarded during the voyage to England it was found missing when the ship docked in London. It has been argued that Macarthur, 'or some close associate', was responsible for its disappearance.

== Promoting a colonial wool industry ==
Macarthur sailed on the Hunter, departing Sydney in November 1801. The vessel was waylaid in Amboyna where Macarthur became good friends with Robert Farquhar, the island's head administrator for the East India Company. Farquhar was the son of Sir Walter Farquhar, who was the personal physician of the Prince of Wales and Prime Minister William Pitt the Younger. Macarthur was later able to use these elite connections of this friendship with Farquhar to gain favour at the highest levels in England. When Macarthur eventually reached England in December 1802, the legal authorities advised that his court martial should have been conducted in Sydney and the case was quietly dropped.

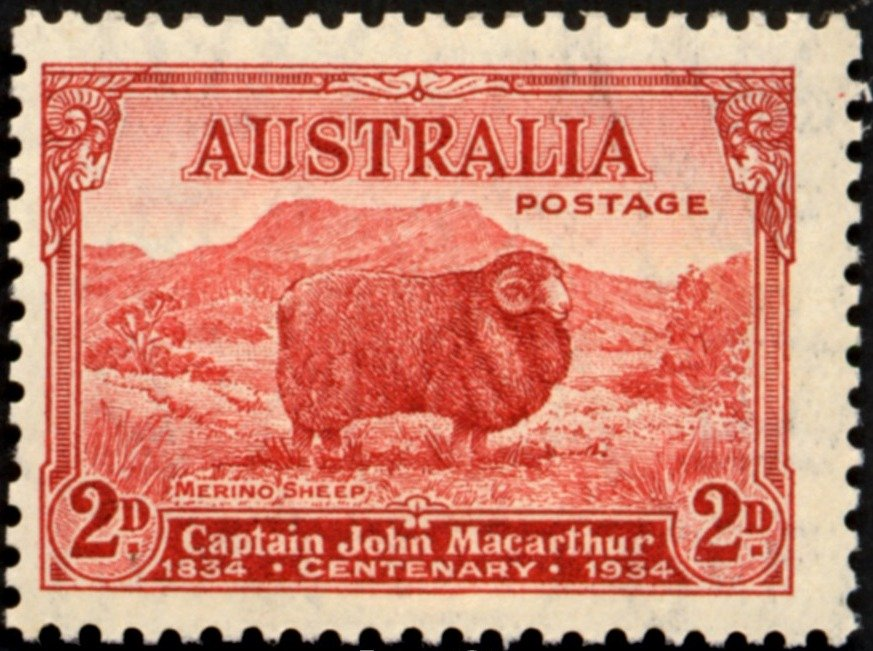
An Australian stamp commemorating Macarthur and the wool industry

While in London, Macarthur lobbied extensively for support of his wool production interests back in New South Wales. Macarthur had samples of the pure Merino wool from his flock, and submitted them to a Committee of Manufacturers who reported that it was equal to any high quality Spanish Wool. Macarthur, encouraged by these findings, quit his position in the army and petitioned the government for permission to occupy 10,000 acres of 'unoccupied land' in New South Wales to raise Merino sheep for the large scale production of colonial British wool.

The Colonial Secretary, Lord Camden, in particular was highly supportive and backed Macarthur for a grant of 10,000 acres of his choosing, 5,000 acres to be given initially and another 5,000 to be offered later. Macarthur was also able to purchase nine Merino rams and a ewe from the highly prized Royal Flock at Kew. Sir Joseph Banks, however, was not impressed with either Macarthur or his commercial venture. When Macarthur failed to conceal his low opinion of Banks, Banks became a strong opponent of the plan and intervened to stop Macarthur from exporting the sheep. Macarthur, however, was able to call upon Lord Camden and his other personal contacts in the colonial administration to allow him to proceed.

Indicative of the success he had found in London in regard to his wool-growing interests, Macarthur purchased a ship he named Argo to which he had a large Golden Fleece figurehead attached. Macarthur sailed from London aboard the Argo with his newly acquired pure Merino sheep, his nephew Hannibal Macarthur and a cousin of Robert Farquhar in Walter Davidson, who would assist Macarthur in forwarding his colonial ambitions.

== Return to New South Wales ==
Macarthur arrived back in Sydney in June 1805 after an absence of nearly four years to claim the large land grants promised to him by Camden and to establish his Merino wool industry. Governor King attempted to defer Macarthur's requests writing that "one-half the colony already belongs to him, and it will not be long before he gets the other half".

Macarthur antagonised King by claiming his 5,000 acres in the Cowpastures. This was prime grazing land, well supplied by water from the Nepean River, and reserved by the Governor exclusively for the colony's cattle herds. King wanted the grant moved, but the Colonial Office wrote back affirming Macarthur's right to the land. Macarthur obtained the Cowpastures grant and named it Camden Park, in honour of his patron.

Commodore William Bligh, who became Governor of New South Wales in 1806, was firmly opposed to Macarthur's venture and turned down his request for the remaining 5,000 acres of his grant. Bligh was also determined to reform the monopoly of trade and corrupt governance that the 'Rum Corps' still held.

== Instigator of the Rum Rebellion ==
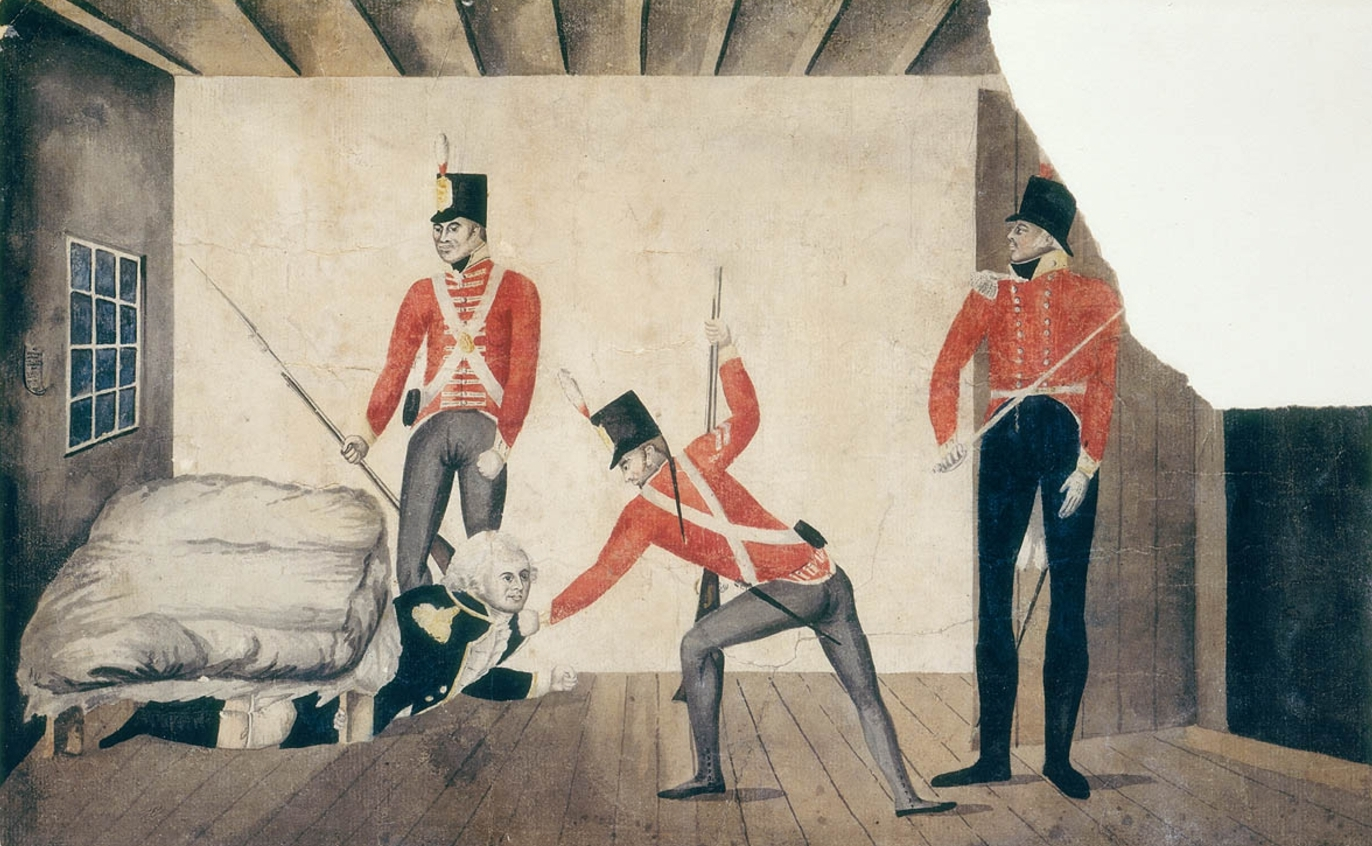
Propaganda cartoon of Governor Bligh's arrest during the Rum Rebellion

Governor Bligh began to crack down on the illicit activities of the 'Rum Corps', especially their trafficking in rum. He confiscated alcohol distillation equipment from Macarthur who, although no longer part of the military, still had immense influence amongst the 'Rum Corps'. Macarthur was able to have the seizure of his equipment overturned in the colony's military courts, a decision which angered and frustrated Bligh.

When one of Macarthur's trading vessels, the Parramatta, was impounded, Macarthur refused to comply with paying a fine and Bligh ordered his arrest. Macarthur resisted and wrote a letter outlining his 'scorn and contempt' for the authorities. Bligh then promptly had him arrested for sedition.

Macarthur was released on bail and a trial was set for 25 January 1808. The court again was stacked with six officers of the 'Rum Corps' who forced the sitting judge to be removed as they did not think he would find in favour of Macarthur. Bligh demanded that the judge be returned, but the officers refused and instead released Macarthur. He was re-arrested the following day but again the officers refused to allow the trial to proceed. Bligh notified the officers, which included Anthony Fenn Kemp and William Lawson, that their actions were treasonous and ordered them to present themselves the following day to the Governor's House.

The six officers ignored Bligh's order and instead released Macarthur again, who in collusion with the commander of the 'Rum Corps', Major George Johnston, produced a document calling for the arrest of Governor Bligh. On the evening of 26 January, Macarthur, Johnston and the other officers marched the mostly drunken soldiers out of their barracks and to the Governor's House to arrest Bligh. Bligh was then taken prisoner in a military coup which is now known as the Rum Rebellion.

== Leader of the junta government ==
Bligh's arrest resulted in a military junta administration being established over the colony. The 'Rum Corps' appointed Johnston as Lieutenant-Governor of New South Wales, while Macarthur was installed in the newly created position of Colonial Secretary which controlled all the government appointments and decisions. Macarthur used this power to remove and imprison magistrates who were not loyal to him, and to grant substantial land-holdings to co-conspirators of the rebellion. For instance, William Gore, who was the provost-marshal and loyal to Bligh, was jailed on trumped-up charges of perjury and sentenced to seven years imprisonment at the convict colony of Newcastle. Likewise, George Suttor a prominent farmer who dared to complain about the corruption of the Macarthur/Johnston government, was jailed for several months.

Johnston was replaced as Lieutenant-Governor in April 1808 by his senior officer Joseph Foveaux who had been at Norfolk Island during the rebellion. The 'Rum Corps' were becoming increasingly concerned about being collectively charged for mutiny and Macarthur's influence started to wane. When Colonel William Paterson (who Macarthur had previously shot in the shoulder) took charge in early 1809, Macarthur thought it best to travel to England to defend himself there against any possible charges of treason.

== Macarthur in England ==
Macarthur journeyed with Johnston to England where they faced trial on charges of mutiny. He utilised his personal friendship with high-ranking aristocrats such as Lord Camden and the Duke of Northumberland to gain protection from prosecution. It was found that Macarthur could not be tried at a court martial because he was no longer a member of the military and was thereby acquitted. Johnston was found guilty of mutiny but his only punishment was his removal from the army.

Macarthur, however, could not return to New South Wales because the new Governor there, Lachlan Macquarie still had orders to prosecute him. Macquarie took command in 1810 with a policy of reforming the cronyism and corruption of the colony and had his own regiment of soldiers replace the 'Rum Corps'. Macarthur therefore thought it safer to stay in England where he remained until 1817.

Macarthur placed his wife Elizabeth Macarthur and his nephew Hannibal Macarthur in charge of his farming interests in New South Wales and when wool prices soared, he was able to instruct them from London to focus on increasing the quality and quantity of their Merino wool exports to England. In spite of this, Macarthur's other mercantile interests in sandalwood, whaling, seal hunting and general trade were faring badly and had left him in considerable debt.

He became increasingly focused on returning to New South Wales to develop his profitable Merino wool business and to establish olive and viticulture industries in the colony. In 1816 he used his political contacts to influence the Secretary of State for War and the Colonies, Lord Bathurst to revoke Macquarie's orders to arrest him and to allow him to return to New South Wales. Macarthur left England with his sons, arriving in Sydney in September 1817.

== Prominent colonist in New South Wales ==
=== The Bigge enquiry ===
On his return to New South Wales, Macarthur found that the "absurd" democratic reforms instituted by Governor Macquarie were an obstacle to his ambitions. He wanted the colony to be a place where "men of real capital" would be given large selections of land to graze sheep, produce high quality wool and become an aristocratic ruling class.

An enquiry into the running of New South Wales was ordered by the British government due to complaints from Macarthur and other conservative colonists about Macquarie's reforms. The enquiry was conducted in 1819 by John Bigge who consulted extensively with Macarthur and concurred with his views. In his subsequent reports, Bigge discredited Macquarie and agreed with Macarthur that rich capitalists should be given large tracts of land with cheap convict labour to advance the wool industry in the colony. Macquarie was replaced as Governor by Thomas Brisbane who put into practice Bigge's recommendations, allowing Macarthur and other wealthy colonists to expand their assets and power.

=== Extensive wealth ===
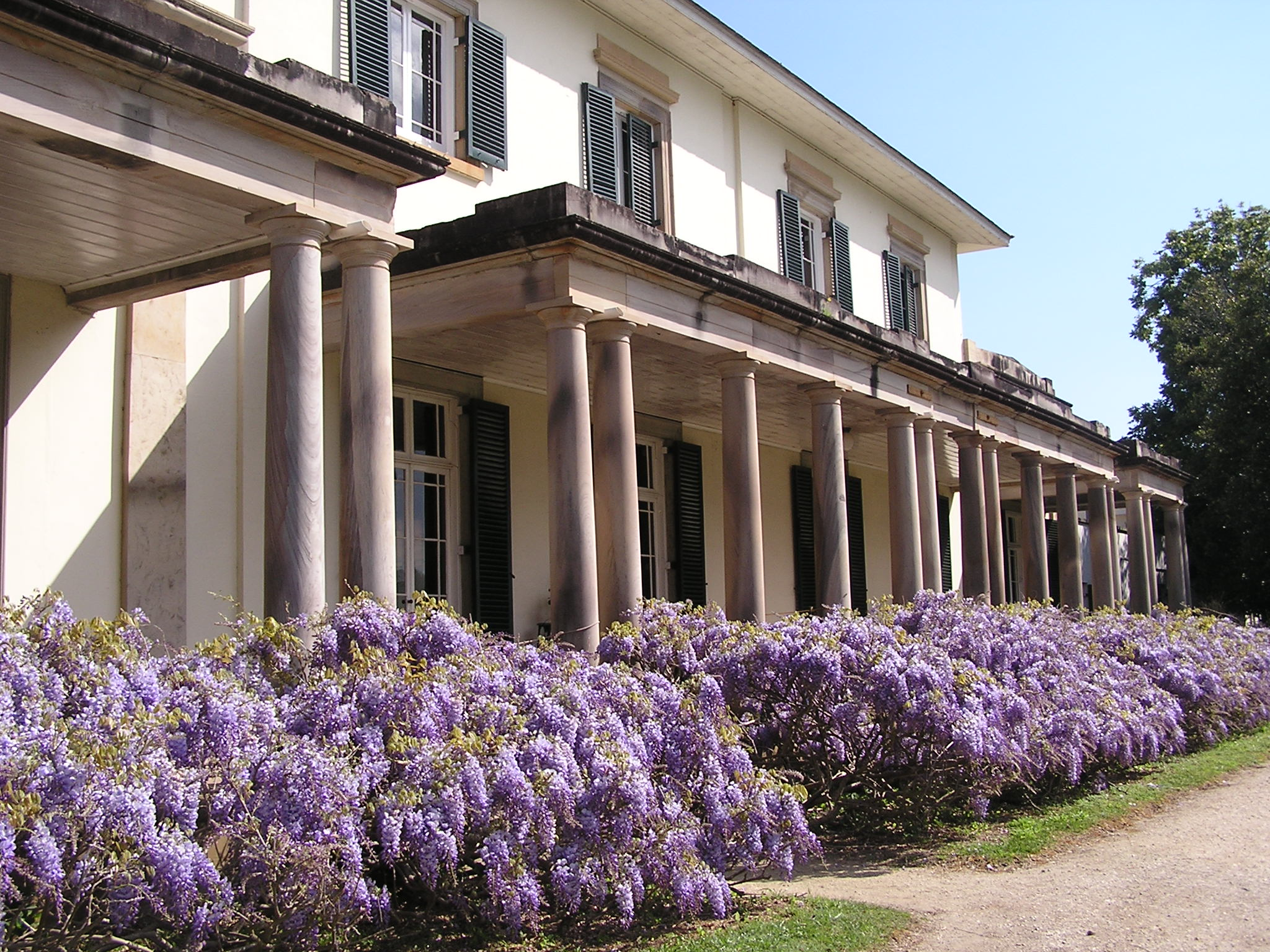
Macarthur's manor-house at Camden Park

The export of wool soon made Macarthur the richest man in New South Wales. In 1822, he finally obtained his second 5,000 acre grant and was awarded with two medals for exporting 68,000 kg (150,000 lb) of wool to England and for increasing the quality of his wool to that of the finest Saxon Merino. In the early 1820s, John Macarthur was an owner of more than 100 horses. He established Camden Park Stud and was a major provider of bloodhorses. His sons, James and William Macarthur, followed in his footsteps and became important thoroughbred owners and breeders.

Macarthur also established Australia's first commercial vineyard. He imported vine plants when he returned to New South Wales in 1817, which he successfully cultivated at Camden Park. His Camden Park Estate comprised 60,000 acres by the end of the 1820s. Macarthur also employed a group of Aboriginal bodyguards who lived with their families under his patronage on the grounds of the Camden Park Estate.

=== Australian Agricultural Company ===
In 1824, a scheme Macarthur had promoted for many years came into existence: a chartered company to mass-produce and export Australian wool. This was the Australian Agricultural Company (AACo). A royal charter allowed the company of 365 initial shareholders investing a combined capital of £1,000,000 to acquire a 1,000,000-acre land grant north of Port Stephens. Macarthur was one of the original directors of the London company and the committee established in New South Wales to manage its operations consisted of his son, son-in-law and nephew. Within the first year these committee members had skimmed around £12,000 of the company's money, while most of the sheep used to stock the massive operation were bought from Macarthur at great profit to him.

Although the AACo came close to becoming insolvent in its early years under the Macarthurs, it went on to become a successful company which still exists today. Macarthur was also a founding investor in the Bank of Australia (1826).

=== Politician ===
In 1822, Macarthur was blocked from becoming a magistrate because of his involvement in the Rum Rebellion. However, in 1825 he was appointed to the New South Wales Legislative Council where he served until 1832 when he was removed due to his failing mental health.

During his period in office Macarthur took an ultra-conservative position, protecting the 'exclusive' colonial aristocratic establishment that he was a leader of. He was fervently against the introduction of jury trials and helped block their use in criminal cases. Macarthur also supported Governor Ralph Darling in his suppression of the free press, and utilised his advantage to attack high-ranking individuals who opposed him. For example, he attempted to have Chief Justice Francis Forbes impeached for ordering him to pay costs in a legal case where Macarthur was alleged to have instigated a riot.

== Insanity and death ==
In 1832, Macarthur was officially declared a lunatic by Governor Richard Bourke and placed under restraint at his home in Camden.

John Macarthur died at his Camden Park Estate on 11 April 1834 and was buried on the property.

== Legacy ==
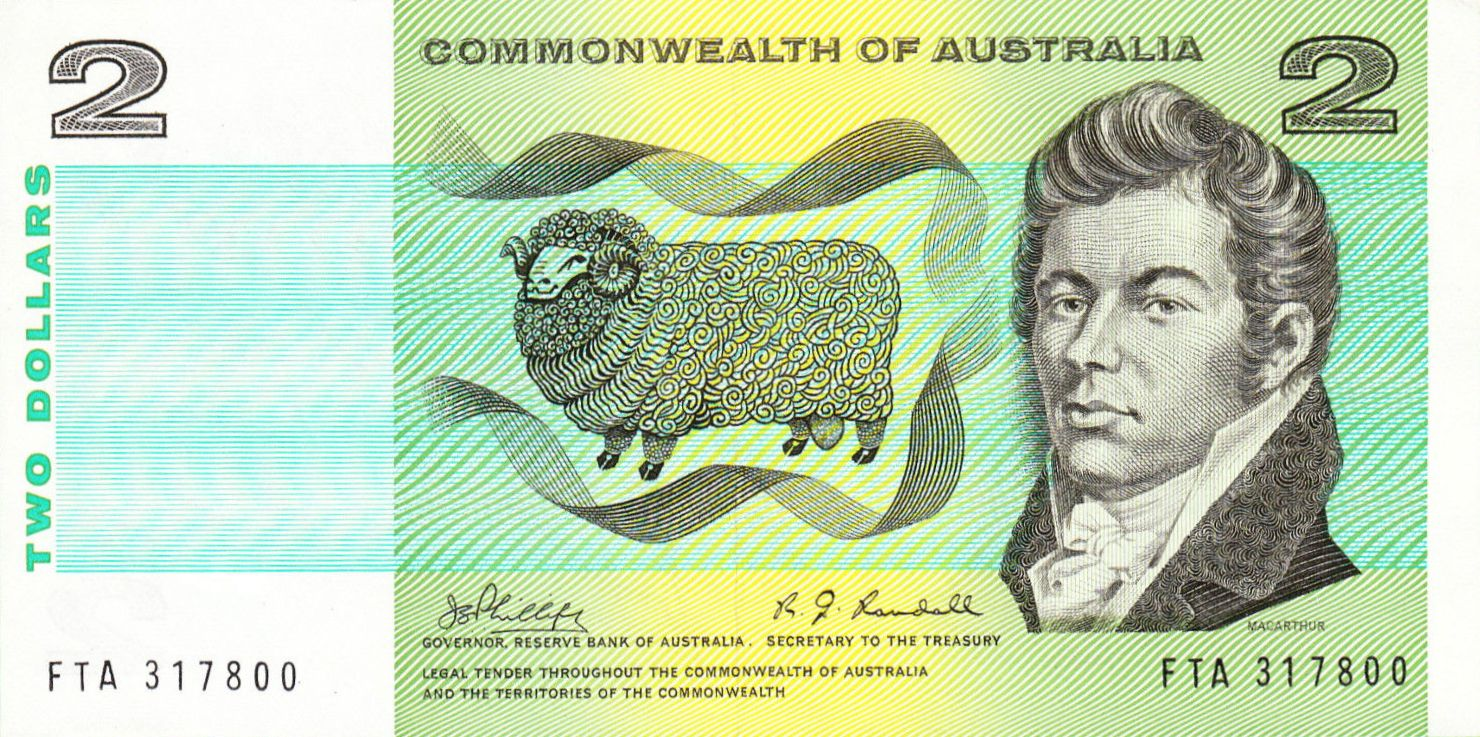
John Macarthur was depicted on the 2 Australian dollar banknote

In recognition of his contribution to Australian agriculture, Macarthur was honoured by a set of three postage stamps issued on the centenary of his death in 1934 (depicting a merino ram).

The Division of Macarthur and the Macarthur Region were named in honour of John and Elizabeth Macarthur. Macarthur, a Canberra suburb is also named after him.

John Macarthur's image and a merino ram is featured on the Australian two-dollar note, first issued in 1966; and since withdrawn from circulation and replaced by a coin in 1988.

Macarthur is a character in Eleanor Dark's semi-fictional Australian classic trilogy The Timeless Land. In the 1980 television adaptation, he was played by Robin Stewart. He also features in Naomi Novik's fantasy novel Tongues of Serpents. He is also a main character in the Vivian Stuart (writing as William Stuart Long) series "The Australians", written in the late 1970s and early 1980s.

Macarthur FC, an A-League football team is also named after him.

=== Family ===
John and Elizabeth Macarthur parented four sons: John, Edward, James and William, the later two being born at Elizabeth Farm; and three daughters: Elizabeth, Mary (who married pastoralist James Bowman) and Emmeline (who married future NSW Premier Henry Parker). His numerous and wealthy descendants remained influential in New South Wales affairs for many years. The Macarthur-Stanhams and Macarthur-Onslows are still wealthy but no longer prominent in public life.

=== Architectural legacy ===
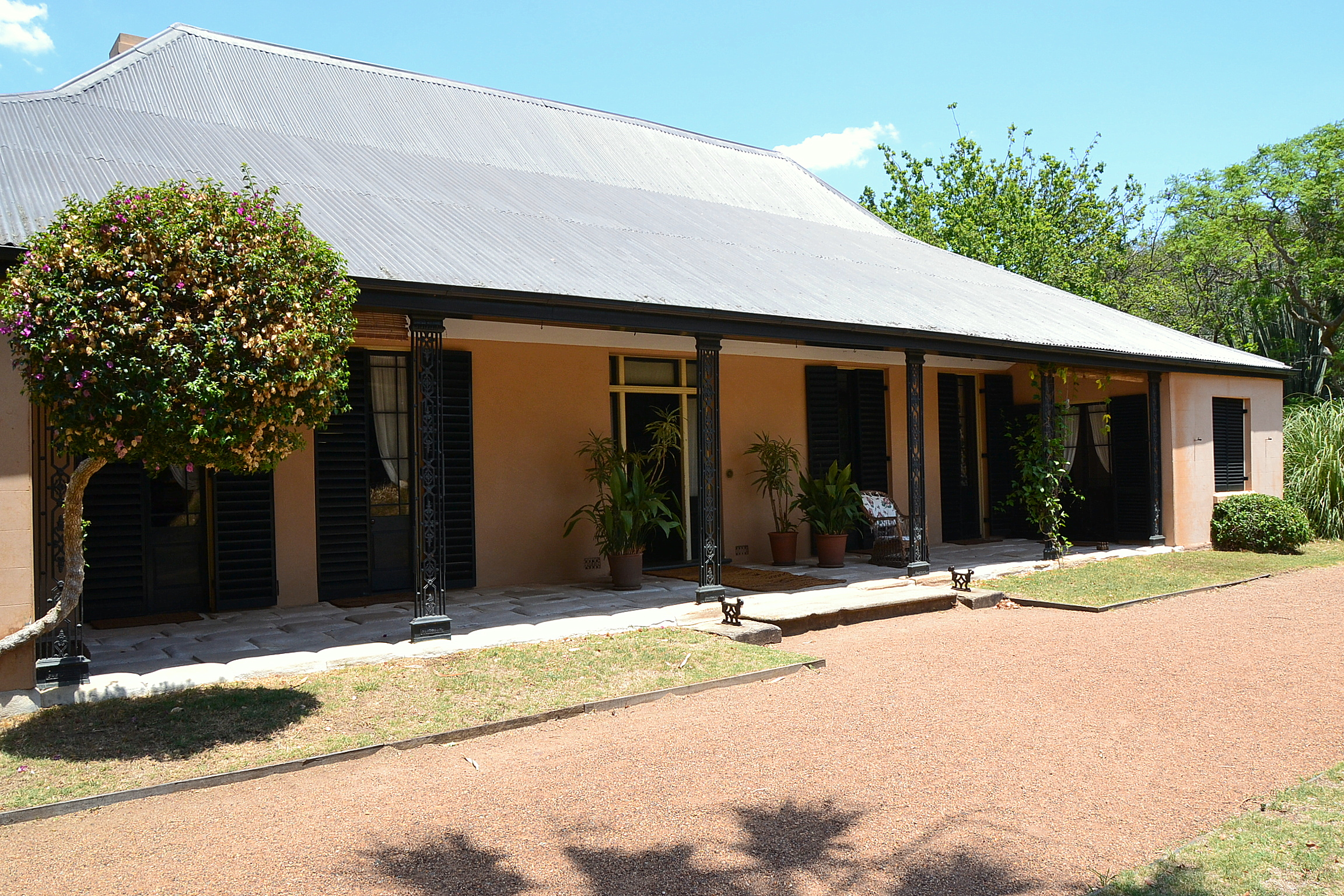
Elizabeth Farm

Elizabeth Farm House is one of the oldest remaining farmhouses in Australia, though all that remains of the initial house is said to be one room. Hambledon Cottage was built in 1824 by John Macarthur and Henry Kitchen, in the early Colonial Georgian style. Both the House and Cottage have managed to survive to the present day.

The Camden Park Estate consisted of 2,023 hectares (5,000 acres) of prime pasture land with two notable dwellings; Camden Park House and Belgenny Cottage. The original Belgenny Cottage was designed and built by Henry Kitchen in the 1820s. The cottage stood as the John Macarthur's residence while he awaited completion of Camden Park House. It was completed in 1835, just after the death of John Macarthur. The descendants of John Macarthur continue to live in Camden Park House.

== See also ==
- New South Wales Corps
- Rum Rebellion
- Camden Park Estate
- Whaling in Australia
- Political families of Australia
- Stormy Petrel (TV series)
