= New South Wales Corps =

Infantry regiment of the British Army

- Active: 1789–1818
- Disbanded: 24 March 1818 (as the 100th Regiment of Foot)
- Country: United Kingdom
- Branch: British Army
- Type: Line infantry
- Size: One battalion
- Nickname: "Rum Corps"
- Facings: Yellow
- Engagements: Hawkesbury and Nepean Wars; Vinegar Hill uprising; Rum Rebellion; War of 1812; Chesapeake campaign; Battle of Craney Island; Ocracoke raid; Battle of St. Michaels; Second Battle of St. Michaels

Commanders
- Notable commanders: Francis Grose; Charles Napier

The New South Wales Corps, later known as the 102d Regiment of Foot, and lastly as the 100th Regiment of Foot, was a formation of the British Army organised in 1789 in England to relieve the New South Wales Marine Corps, which had accompanied the First Fleet to New South Wales. In Australia, the New South Wales Corps gained notoriety for its trade in rum and mutinous behaviour.

Reconstituted as the 102d Regiment of Foot, it was transferred to Bermuda and Nova Scotia, before taking part in the Chesapeake campaign of the War of 1812. Reconstituted for the second time after the war as the 100th Regiment of Foot, it was disbanded in 1818.

== History ==
=== Formation ===
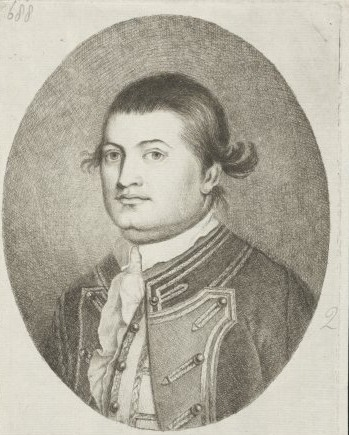
Major Francis Grose, who commanded the corps in its early years

In June 1789, the regiment was formed in England as a permanent unit to relieve the New South Wales Marine Corps, who had accompanied the First Fleet to Australia. The regiment began arriving as guards on the Second Fleet in 1790. The regiment, led by Major Francis Grose, consisted of three companies, numbering about 300 men. Although drafts were sent from Britain to reinforce the regiment throughout its time in Australia, its full strength never exceeded 500. A fourth company was raised from those Marines wishing to remain in New South Wales under Captain George Johnston, who had been Governor Arthur Phillip's aide-de-camp.

In December 1792, when Phillip returned to England for respite, Grose was left in charge. Grose immediately abandoned Phillip's plans for governing the colony. A staunch military man, he established military rule and set out to secure the authority of the Corps. He abolished the civilian courts and transferred the magistrates to the authority of Captain Joseph Foveaux.

After the poor crops of 1793 he cut the rations of the convicts but not those of the Corps, overturning Phillip's policy of equal rations for all. In a connived attempt to improve agricultural production and make the colony more self-sufficient, Grose turned away from collective farming and made generous land grants to officers of the Corps. They were also provided with government-fed and clothed convicts as farm labour.

=== Rum trading ===
Grose also relaxed Phillip's prohibition on trading of rum, sometimes a generic term for any form of distilled beverage, usually made from wheat, commonly from Bengal. The colony, like many British territories at the time, was short of coins, and rum soon became the medium of trade. The officers of the Corps were able to use their position and wealth to buy all the imported rum and then exchange it for goods and labour at very favourable rates, earning the Corps the nickname "The Rum Corps". By 1793 stills were being imported and grain was being used to make rum, exacerbating the shortage of grain.

Due to poor health Grose returned to England in December 1794 and Captain William Paterson assumed temporary command until a permanent replacement, Governor John Hunter, arrived in September 1795. Paterson had obtained his commission with the backing of Sir Joseph Banks because he was interested in natural history and would explore and collect samples for Banks and the Royal Society.

Governor Hunter attempted unsuccessfully to use the troops of the Corps to guard imported rum and stop the officers from buying it up. Attempts to stop the importation were also thwarted by the failure of other governments to co-operate and by the Corps' officers chartering of a Danish ship to bring in a large shipment of rum from India. Hunter also tried to start up a public store with goods from England to provide competition and stabilise the price of goods, but Hunter was not a good businessman and supplies were too erratic.

Hunter requested greater control by authorities in England and an excise duty on rum. He issued an order restricting the amount of convict labour that officers could use, but again had no means to enforce it. Hunter was strongly opposed by officers of the Corps, and pamphlets and letters against him were circulated. John Macarthur wrote a letter accusing Hunter of ineffectiveness and trading in rum. Hunter was required by the Colonial Office to answer the charges, and soon after was recalled for being ineffective.

In 1799 Paterson, now a Lieutenant Colonel, returned from England with orders to stamp out the trading in rum by officers of the Corps. In 1800, he charged Major George Johnston, who had served as Hunter's aide-de-camp, with giving a sergeant part payment in rum at an exorbitant rate. Johnston claimed he was being unfairly persecuted and demanded that he be sent to England for trial. The English courts decided that colonial affairs were not a matter for them and, as all the evidence and witnesses were in Sydney, that any trial should be held there. They decided that, as proper court martial could not be constituted in Sydney, no further action should be taken against Johnston.

Governor Philip King, appointed in September 1800, continued Hunter's efforts to prevent the Corps trading in rum. He had the power to levy an excise duty on alcohol, and the Transit Board now required all ships to lodge a bond which was forfeit for disobeying the Governor's orders, which included the prohibition of the landing of more than 500 gallons of rum. King also encouraged private importers and traders, opened a public brewery in 1804, and introduced a schedule of values for Indian copper and Spanish pieces of eight which were used as currency. There was still a serious problem keeping the coin in the colony, despite it being valued higher than its face value. King's actions were not wholly effective but they still antagonised officers of the Corps. Like Hunter, he was the subject of pamphlets and attacks. King tried, unsuccessfully, to court-martial the officers responsible.

=== Castle Hill convict rebellion ===
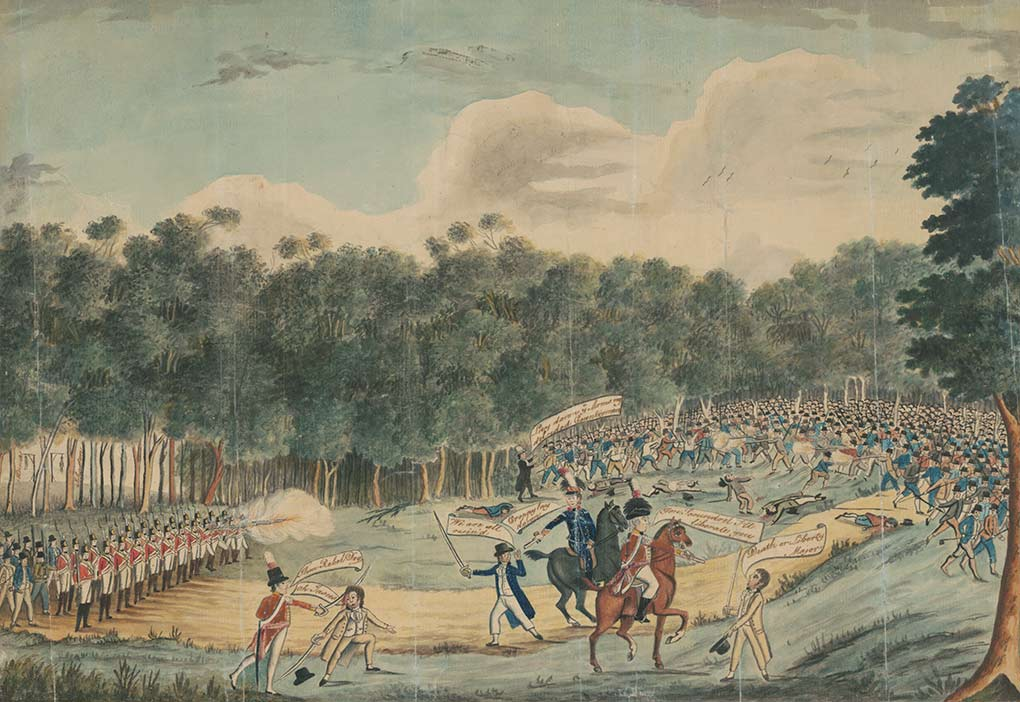
Contemporary illustration of the rebellion

The Corps were called into action responding to the Castle Hill convict rebellion. Late on 4 March 1804, a great number of rebels rose up at the government farm at Castle Hill, New South Wales, armed themselves with muskets and pikes from surrounding farms, and planned to sack Parramatta and occupy Sydney Town.

An alarm at around 11pm raised Major Johnston from his sleep. He then led 29 soldiers of the New South Wales Corps on a forced march from their barracks at Annandale to Parramatta. They arrived around dawn. Later in the morning, with 50 militiamen of the Loyal Volunteers, they pursued the rebels who were now heading to Green Hills, today's Windsor.

At a feigned meeting with the rebels aided by a priest as a lure, Johnston took the ringleaders hostage. When they and their men refused to surrender, to the shouts of 'death or liberty' the troops quickly put down the revolt. Over the next three days, repercussions and summary justice reigned. Governor King highly commended Major Johnston for his actions, even though King had to intervene directly to stop a military kangaroo court from hanging one in ten of the rebels. At midnight on 4 March, Captain Daniel Woodriff of HMS Calcutta landed 150 of his crew to assist the New South Wales Corps and Governor King.

=== Rum Rebellion ===
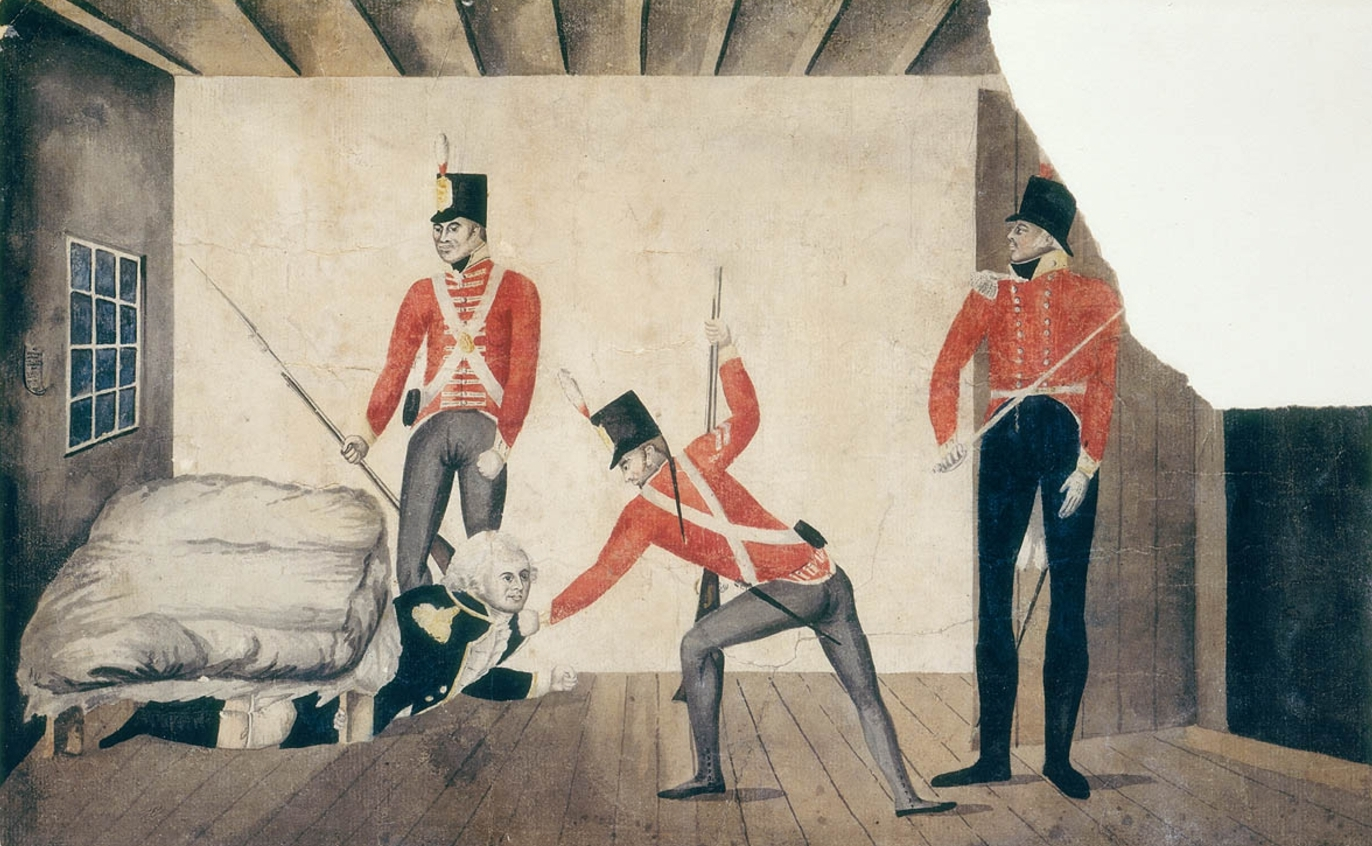
A propaganda cartoon of Bligh's arrest in Sydney in 1808, portraying him as a coward.

Governor King had been requesting a replacement, for at least a year. In 1805, Governor William Bligh was appointed. Although the economy had developed and diversified somewhat by 1806, Bligh arrived determined to bring the Corps, and especially John Macarthur, to heel, and stop their trading in rum. This led to the Rum Rebellion, the deposing of Bligh, and the eventual recall of the New South Wales Corps.

In 1808, the New South Wales Corps was renamed the 102d Regiment of Foot. Having arrived in the colony in December 1809 with the 73rd Regiment of Foot, which was to take over from the 102d Regiment of Foot, Governor Lachlan Macquarie was able to control the rum trade more effectively, introducing and enforcing a licensing system.

Due to the lack of currency, he was still forced to pay for public works in rum. The construction of Sydney Hospital was entirely funded by granting a monopoly on the import of rum to the contractors, who were the merchants Alexander Riley and Garnham Blaxcell. The colonial surgeon D'Arcy Wentworth, and troops were used to prohibit the landing of rum anywhere but at the hospital dock.

A few of the officers and long-serving privates in the 102d Regiment were transferred to Macquarie's 73rd regiment, bringing it up to near full strength. About 100 veterans and invalids were retained for garrison duty in New South Wales.

=== War of 1812 ===
Most members of the 102d Regiment of Foot embarked for England in May 1810. Upon arrival, a majority went to veteran or garrison battalions, most officers ending up in the 8th Royal Veteran Battalion. The regiment was reconstituted with new recruits, including 150 men "of free birth and good character" born in the colony of New South Wales, after it arrived at its new base in Horsham in October 1810. It was sent to Guernsey in July 1811. The regiment was posted to the Bermuda Garrison, stationed at St. George's Garrison in 1812, this being part of the Nova Scotia Command, co-inciding with the start of the War of 1812.

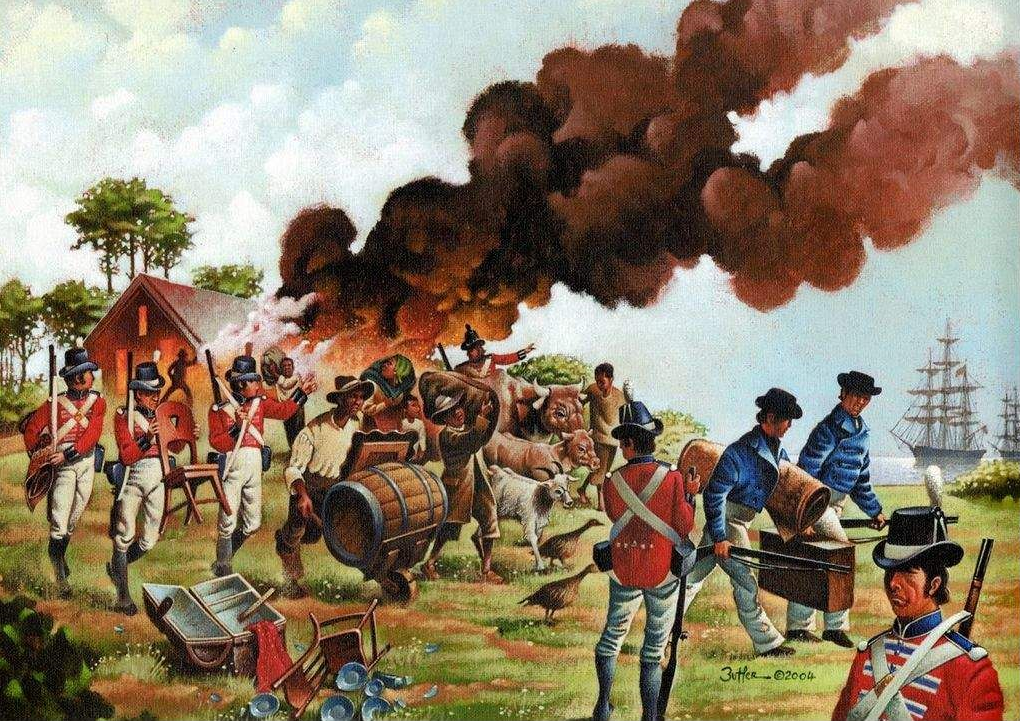
British forces raid a Chesapeake Bay settlement during the War of 1812.

In 1813, Lieutenant-Colonel, Sir Thomas Sydney Beckwith arrived in Bermuda to command a force tasked with raiding the Atlantic Seaboard of the United States, specifically in the region of Chesapeake Bay, with the 102d Regiment's Commanding Officer, Lieutenant-Colonel Charles James Napier, as his Second-in-Command. Beckwith split the force into two brigades. One, was the 102d Regiment, Royal Marines from the Bermudian naval base, and two companies recruited from French prisoners-of-war that had been sent to reinforce the Bermuda garrison, was under Napier's command, and the other under Lieutenant-Colonel Williams of the Royal Marines. Embarking aboard naval vessels engaged on the American coast on the 8 June 1813, they took part in the Battle of Craney Island on 22 June 1813.

On 8 August 1813, 15 British ships blockaded the mouth of the Patapsco River as part of a ruse to make the Americans believe Baltimore was under threat. After a few days the ships headed south towards Annapolis. However, Rear Admiral George Cockburn believed Annapolis too heavily defended, and instead had the 102d Regiment and Royal Marines construct a base on Kent Island. The 102d Regiment fought a small skirmish against local militia on the island, before assisting with construction of the base.

After carrying out raids on the Atlantic coast of the United States, and minus the two companies of Frenchmen, they left the Chesapeake and landed at Halifax, Nova Scotia, on 20 September 1813. The Royal Marine battalion and Royal Marine Artillery were to go to Quebec under the command of Beckwith, leaving Napier a brigade of 1,000 infantry and three artillery pieces. It had been proposed to move the 102d to operations in the American south, but this was not carried out. Napier transferred by exchange to the 50th Regiment of Foot in September 1813.

Detachments of the 102d Regiment of Foot remained on both sides of the border between the British colony of New Brunswick and the U.S. state of Maine after the war's end in December 1814 at Moose Island, modern day Eastport, Maine, United States. The Treaty of Ghent was signed on 24 December 1814 by the negotiators, ratified by the Prince Regent on 27 December, and by the United States President on 17 February, ending the war. After three years at New Brunswick, it embarked in the autumn of 1817 to return to England under the command of Major Gustavus Rochford.

After the end of the wars against Napoleonic France and the United States, the British Army disbanded many units for the sake of economy. The regiment was reorganized as the 100th Regiment of Foot in 1816. The regiment was the last British unit to occupy the United States; the last detachments returned to Chatham in England, where the regiment was disbanded on 24 March 1818.

== Commanding officers ==
The regiment's commanding officers were:
New South Wales Corps

- Major Francis Grose (1789–94)
- Lieutenant Colonel William Paterson (1794–1809)

102d Regiment of Foot

- Lieutenant Colonel William Paterson (1809–10)
- Major George Johnston (1810–11)
- Lieutenant Colonel Charles James Napier (1811–1813)
- Major Gustavus Rochford (1813–1818)

== Officers who became prominent colonists ==
Many of the regiment's officers became wealthy and powerful individuals from their corrupt practices while in control of the colony. These officers and their descendants went on to become prominent colonists, government officials and land-holders in Australia. Examples are:

- Captain John Macarthur: pioneer of the Merino wool industry in Australia, founder of the Australian Agricultural Company, and large landowner at Camden.
- Captain William Cox: builder of the road across the Blue Mountains, important pastoralist in the Hawkesbury and Bathurst regions.
- Captain John Piper: significant land-holder in Sydney and Bathurst.
- Captain Edward Abbott: important colonist of Tasmania.
- Lieutenant William Lawson: explorer across the Blue Mountains and prominent land-holder in the Mudgee region.
- Lieutenant Anthony Fenn Kemp: significant colonist of Tasmania.
- Lieutenant Archibald Bell Sr.: important landowner in the Hawkesbury region.
- Surgeon John Harris: extensive property owner in Sydney and the Bathurst region.
- Lieutenant Nicholas Bayly: large land-holder in Cabramatta region.

== See also ==
- Colonial forces of Australia
- Rum Rebellion

== Bibliography ==
- Jose, A.W.; et al., eds. (1927). The Australian Encyclopedia. Sydney: Angus & Robertson.
- Kuring, Ian (2004). Redcoats to Cams: A History of Australian Infantry 1788–2001. Loftus, New South Wales: Australian Military History Publications. ISBN 1-876439-99-8.
- Napier, Lieutenant-General Sir William Francis Patrick (1857). The Life and Opinions of General Sir Charles James Napier, G.C.B. Volume I (of IV). London, England: John Murray, Albemarle Street.
- Silver, Lynette Ramsay (1989). The Battle of Vinegar Hill: Australia's Irish Rebellion, 1804. Sydney, New South Wales: Doubleday. ISBN 0-86824-326-4.
- Stanley, Peter (1986). The Remote Garrison: The British Army in Australia. Kenthurst, New South Wales: Kangaroo Press. ISBN 0-86417-091-2.
