= List of officers of the New South Wales Marine Corps =

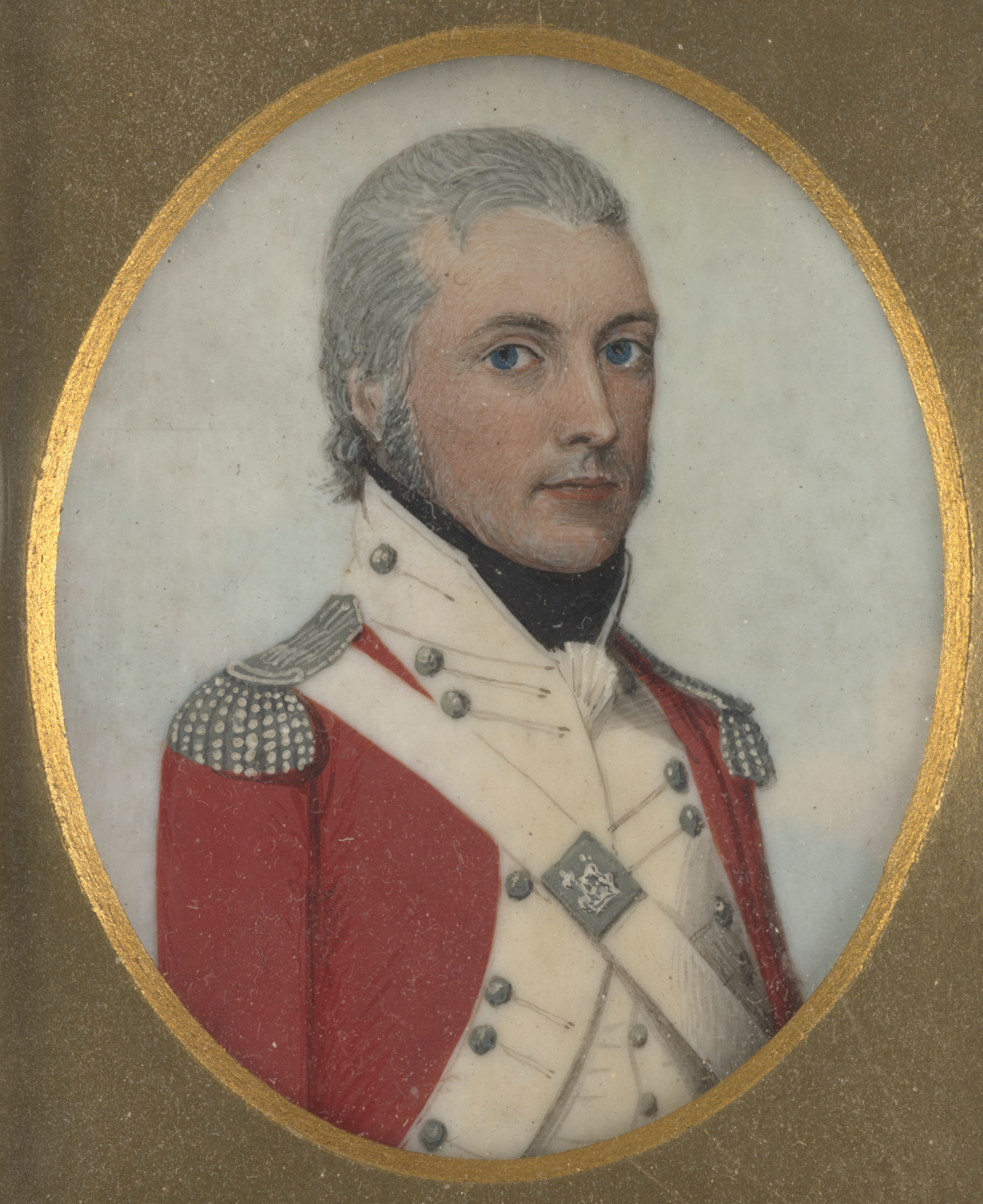
Watkin Tench, an officer of the New South Wales Marine Corps.

The officers of the New South Wales Marine Corps commanded the first European military unit to be stationed on the Australian continent. Commissioned to guard convicts aboard the First Fleet to Botany Bay in 1788, they subsequently enforced discipline at penal colonies in Port Jackson and Norfolk Island. The New South Wales Marines were disbanded from 1791 to 1792 as their enlistment term expired. The majority of officers returned to equivalent roles in the British Marines.

== Background ==
The New South Wales Marine Corps was an ad hoc volunteer unit created by the Royal Navy to guard the convicts aboard the First Fleet to Australia, and to preserve "subordination and regularity" in the penal colony in New South Wales. The Corps was established on 31 August 1786 with assent from King George III for a force of Marines and accompanying officers to enforce "... subordination and obedience in the settlement [at Botany Bay], as well as for defence of that settlement against the incursions of the natives." At full strength the New South Wales Marine Corps numbered 213 men.

Volunteers for the NSW Marine Corps were required to have had a satisfactory prior record of service in the British Marines, to be at least 5 ft 6 in (1.68 m) tall and under forty years of age. Both officers and men were entitled to an honourable discharge after three years of colonial service, as an alternative to the British Marine tradition of enlistment for life. Rates of pay were in accordance with equivalent ranks in the British Marines including routine provision of a subsistence allowance worth two-thirds of daily pay. British Marines received the allowance when in the field (i.e., not serving on board a vessel); the New South Wales Marines received the allowance for the duration of their three-year enlistment, relieving the Admiralty or the government of the colony of the responsibility of providing messing facilities.

Officers wore a red long-tailed doublet, white trousers, black shoes with gaiters, and a black headdress. They were authorised to carry swords and sidearms in addition to the Brown Bess musket available to all personnel.

== Marine Corps officers ==
Name	Born	NSW Marine Corps service	NSW rank	NSW duties	Subsequent service	Death
Robert Ross	1740	October 1786 — November 1792	brevet Major	Commander, New South Wales Marines; Lieutenant Governor, Colony of New South Wales	Brevet rank not confirmed, and relegated to captain-lieutenant, Chatham Division; Marine Recruiting Officer, St Albans and Ipswich, 1792 — 1794	1794 of natural causes, Brompton, England
James Campbell	c.1740	May 1787 — December 1791	Captain	Company Commander	Promoted to Major of Marines, 1794	1795
John Shea	c.1755	December 1786 — February 1789	Captain	Company Commander	None	1789 of tuberculosis, Port Jackson, NSW
James Meredith	1753	May 1787 — December 1791	Captain-lieutenant	Company Commander	Promoted to Major-general of Marines, 1811; Promoted to Lieutenant-general, 1821; Promoted to General, 1838	1841 of natural causes, Monmouth England
Watkin Tench	1758	December 1786 — December 1791	Captain-lieutenant	Company Commander	Promoted to Major of Marines, 1792; French prisoner-of-war, 1801—1802* Promoted Major-general 1816; Commandant, Plymouth Division, 1819 — 1827	1833 of natural causes, Devonport England
George Johnston	1764	November 1786 — June 1791	First Lieutenant	Promoted to captain-lieutenant, 1789; Aide-de-camp to Governor Arthur Phillip, 1788—1791	Transferred to New South Wales Corps, 1791; Promoted to brevet Major, 1800; Ringleader of Rum Rebellion, 1808; Cashiered, 1811	1823 of natural causes, Lake Illawarra, NSW
John Creswell	unknown	May 1787 — December 1791	Second Lieutenant	—	Promoted to captain, 1792; Injured in action, Battle of the Nile, 1798; Promoted to Major, 1802	1804
Thomas Davey	unknown	November 1786 — December 1791	First Lieutenant	—	Promoted to captain, 1795; Promoted to brevet Major, 1808; Appointed Lieutenant Governor of Tasmania, 1812	1823 of natural causes, London England
James Furzer	unknown	December 1786 — December 1791	First Lieutenant	Quartermaster	Not promoted on return to England; Served aboard HMS Carnatic, 1794—1795	1799, West Indies
James Maxwell	unknown	May 1787 — July 1788	First Lieutenant	Incapacitated by dysentery and an unspecified eye disease on arrival in NSW; Invalided to England, 1788	None	1792 of disease, Plymouth England
Robert Kellow	unknown	May 1787 — December 1791	First Lieutenant	Transferred to Norfolk Island, March 1790; Suspended on charges of improper conduct and endangering a fellow officer, July 1790; Reinstated after apology for misconduct, October 1791	Not promoted on return to England; Last listed as a Marines officer in 1815	unknown
John Poulden	unknown	December 1786 — December 1791	First Lieutenant	—	Promoted to captain, 1794; Last listed as a Marines officer in 1814	unknown
John Johnson	unknown	November 1786 — December 1791	First Lieutenant	—	Promoted several times, ultimately to Lieutenant-Colonel	unknown
William Faddy	unknown	December 1786 — December 1791	Second Lieutenant	—	* Promoted to captain-lieutenant, 1797	1798, killed in action aboard HMS Vanguard, Egypt
John Long	unknown	December 1786 — December 1791	Second Lieutenant	Adjutant, NSW Marine Corps 1786—1791	promoted to brevet Major, 1808; Transferred to British Army and promoted to lieutenant colonel, 1814; Last listed as an Army officer in 1825	unknown
Thomas Timins	unknown	December 1786 — June 1792	Second Lieutenant	—	Promoted to captain-lieutenant, 1795; Promoted to captain, 1796; Served aboard HMS Dreadnought, Battle of Trafalgar, 1805; Promoted to major, 1810; Promoted to lieutenant colonel, 1823	1828 of natural causes, Southsea England
James Shairp	unknown	December 1786 — December 1791	First Lieutenant	Named second-in-command to Captain Campbell at Rose Hill, 1788	Promoted to captain, 1795	1796 of disease, Chatham England
Ralph Clark	1755	December 1786 — December 1791	Second Lieutenant	Superintendent of Works, Norfolk Island, 1790—1791	Served in West Indies aboard HMS Tartar, 1793—1794	1794, killed in action, Haiti
William Dawes	1762	1787 — December 1791	Second Lieutenant	Artillery Officer, NSW Marine Corps, 1787—1791	Governor of Sierra Leone, 1792, 1795—96; Mathematics master, Christ's Hospital School, 1799—1800	1836, Antigua
Alexander Ross	unknown	July 1788 — December 1791	Second Lieutenant (local rank)	Son of Major Robert Ross, appointed Second Lieutenant on departure of James Maxwell, 1788	Second Lieutenant's rank formalised, 1792; Appointed Adjutant, Plymouth Marines, 1799	1801, Brentford England

== Bibliography ==
- Bladen, F. M., ed. (1978). Historical records of New South Wales. Vol. 2. Grose and Paterson, 1793–1795. Lansdown Slattery & Co. ISBN 0868330035.
- Britton, Alex R., ed. (1978). Historical records of New South Wales. Vol. 1, part 2. Phillip, 1783–1792. Lansdown Slattery & Co. p. 56. OCLC 219911274.
- Moore, John (1989). The First Fleet Marines. University of Queensland Press. ISBN 0702220655.
