= James Shairp =

British Marines officer

Captain James Shairp
- Died: December 1795; Chatham, Great Britain
- Military career
- Allegiance: Great Britain
- Branch: British Marines
- Service years: 1778 - 1795
- Rank: Captain of Marines
- Units: 55 Company, Portsmouth Division; 57 Company, Portsmouth Division; Botany Bay detachment; 13 Company, Chatham Division; 74 Company, Chatham Division

James Maitland Shairp (died 1795) was an officer in the British Marines and a member of the First Fleet which founded European settlement in Australia.

Commissioned as a Marines officer in 1778, Shairp volunteered for Australian service in 1787 and spent two years as second in command at Rose Hill, New South Wales, the colony's only inland settlement. In 1789 he was a principal protagonist in the "Criminal Court Affair," a dispute between civilian and military authorities which was a catalyst for the 1792 replacement of the colony's Marine detachment with the New South Wales Corps.

His colonial deployment at an end, Shairp returned to England in 1792 and resumed his service with the Chatham Division of Marines. He was promoted to captain of Marines in 1795, but died later that year.

== Early life ==
Shairp was initially commissioned as a second lieutenant, 55 Company, Portsmouth Division on 12 June 1778. On 25 October 1780 he was promoted to first lieutenant and transferred to the 57 Company, also headquartered at Portsmouth. He was placed on half-pay from 1783 following a reduction in British military forces after the American Revolutionary War, but returned to full pay a year later as First Lieutenant in the Chatham Division of Marines under the command of Major-General Carruthers. In 1785 he was stationed in the Caribbean aboard the 20-gun HMS Camilla and the 24-gun HMS Hyaena.

== Australian service ==
Map of Sydney Cove, Port Jackson at the time of Shairp's colonial service in 1789. Original in National Library of Australia, Canberra.

On 20 December 1786 Shairp volunteered for service in Australia with the Botany Bay Marine detachment. Three weeks later he embarked aboard the convict transport Alexander for the voyage to Australia, arriving as part of the First Fleet on 18 January 1788.

In November 1788 he was named second-in-command to Captain James Campbell for the expedition to found the colony's first inland settlement, at Rose Hill, leading a party of twenty-five marines and seventy convicts. Campbell, Shairp and fellow Marine lieutenant John Johnson remained at Rose Hill for the following eighteen months, overseeing the garrison and ensuring construction of a redoubt with barracks for officers and a hundred soldiers. Barracks construction was completed in April 1790, several months ahead of similar works in Port Jackson.

=== Criminal Court Affair ===
In addition to his duties as a Marine, Shairp and his fellow officers had been designated assistant judges for the colony's Criminal Court, acting in place of a jury. As a consequence of this service, Shairp became an unwilling participant in the "Criminal Court Affair" of April 1789, a constitutional dispute which placed him in direct conflict with his superior officer Captain Campbell, and with Marine commander Major Robert Ross.

Since 1788 Major Ross had consistently objected to Marine officers serving on civilian courts, considering it an insult to their separate chain of command and an encroachment on their military role. In April 1789 the colony's Judge Advocate David Collins ruled against prosecuting a convict charged with perjuring themselves in a case involving a Marine; in retaliation, Major Ross persuaded Captain Campbell to write to Collins refusing to serve on the civilian Court. Ross then called a meeting with three junior officers: Shairp and Johnson from Rose Hill, and lieutenant John Poulden from Port Jackson, at which he urged them to join Campbell in refusing to serve on the Court.

Shairp and his fellow junior officers refused. Instead they wrote to colonial Governor Arthur Phillip stating that the Collins-Campbell dispute was a "private disagreement" in which they had no part. On the specific question of military officers sitting as members of a civilian court, Shairp advised Major Ross that he had seen the Act of Parliament establishing the colony of New South Wales, and, "always conceived it to be part of my duty to sit on criminal courts when ordered, during the time of my remaining in this country."

Governor Phillip convened a Court of Enquiry to investigate the matter. Phillip also directed that Marine officers fill roles as assistant judges for the Enquiry itself, despite continued opposition from Major Ross. On consideration the Enquiry upheld Shairp's view that court service by the Marines was legitimate in imperial law.

Despite this open defiance from three officers in his command, Ross chose not to pursue the issue. Captain Campbell reluctantly resumed his court duties alongside Shairp, Johnson and Poulden, claiming he was acting solely as a "volunteer." However, Ross' friends made their displeasure known at Shairp's defiance of his commander. Following resolution of the Affair, fellow Marine Lieutenant Ralph Clark, a Ross loyalist, wrote of Shairp that, "he is a man that I detest from the bottom of my soul."

The Affair itself, and Ross' attempt to influence Shairp and others against playing a role in civilian law enforcement, was sufficiently disturbing to Governor Phillip that in 1790 he successfully petitioned the British Government to replace the colony's entire Marine detachment with a regular army unit.

== Return to England ==
Shairp's three year commission in New South Wales expired in 1791. He had contemplated remaining in the colony as a settler, subject to receiving an acceptable grant of land. An offer was made but it was evidently insufficient, and Shairp departed the colony on 19 June 1792 aboard HMS Gorgon.

Shairp's experience in serving under Major Ross in New South Wales had engendered a lasting hostility between the men, manifesting itself in Shairp's offer to appear as a defence witness in a court-martial brought by Ross in 1792. Ross had accused former New South Wales Marine Captain James Meredith of "improper conduct" in the "Criminal Court Affair" three years earlier. Shairp and others gave evidence against Ross in September 1792; their testimony being described in the judgement as "very respectable" and accepted "unreservedly" by the court. On 18 September the military court acquitted Captain Meredith and described Major Ross' allegations as groundless and maliciously brought. The finding crippled Ross' military career.

Shairp subsequently resumed his service with the Chatham Division of Marines. He was promoted to captain-lieutenant of the 13 Company on 9 May 1795, (Note: Some sources say 7 May 1795) and to captain of the 74 Company on 7 November in the same year. However ill health prevented Shairp from taking up this final post. He died at Chatham in December 1795.
