= Robert Sidaway =

Australian theatre owner (1758–1809)

- Born: 14 January 1758; St. Leonards, Shoreditch, London
- Died: 13 October 1809 (aged 51); Sydney, Australia
- Occupations: Watch case maker, baker, theatre owner
- Partner: Mary Marshall
- Parent(s): John & Elizabeth Sidaway

Robert Sidaway (14 January 1758 – 13 October 1809), a convict of the First Fleet, was transported to Australia for stealing in 1788. Robert is known for being baker for the British Marines of Sydney and opening the first theatre in Sydney in 1796.

== Life ==
Born to John and Elizabeth Sidaway of Horse Shoe Alley, Robert was baptised 5 February at St Leonards, Shoreditch, London, England.

On 11 September 1782 Sidaway was indicted at the Old Bailey for stealing on the 22d of June last, a deal box, value 1s; a cloth coat, value 12s; a waistcoat value 5s; a pair of breeches, value 5s; a linen waistcoat, value 2s; one pair of silk stockings, value 2s; and one pair of shoes, value 3s; the goods of different persons. Sentence was brought down as transportation for seven years to America.

In 1782 at the age of 24, Sidaway was indicted for having been convicted of grand larceny at the last sessions, and ordered by the Court to be sent and transported to America for the term of seven years, was afterwards on the 18th day of September last found at large within this realm of Great Britain, without any lawful cause, before the expiration of the said term of seven years, for which he had been so transported, against the form of the statute. Sidaway was sentenced to Death, but like many sentences of death, death sentences were not carried out, and was instead transported to Australia for life.

Robert was transported in the First Fleet, on the transport ship Friendship, arriving in New South Wales 26 January 1788. On the Journey out to Australia Ralph Clark noted in his diary on two separate occasions that Sidaway was put in leg irons.

14 December 1787. Put Robt. Sidaway in a pair of Leg irons for being impertinent to Mr. Faddy

20 January 1788. Robt. Sidaway was put out of Irons this day

Sidaway received a conditional pardon on 29 November 1792, an absolute pardon on 27 September 1794, and was given a contract as baker for the troops. These pardons were issued by Francis Grose.

== Theatre ==
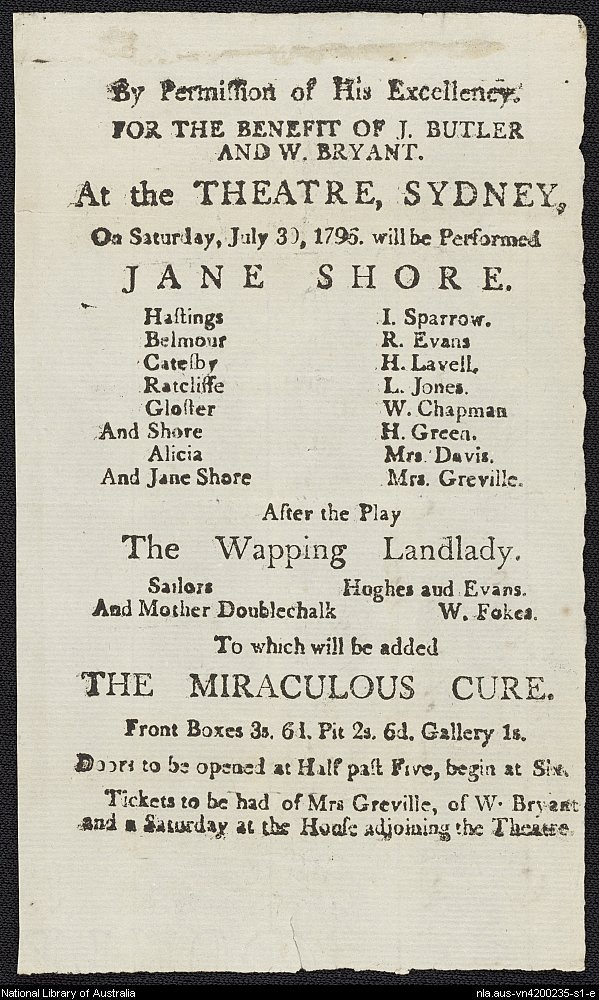
An original play bill from Sidaway's theatre, dated 30 July 1796.

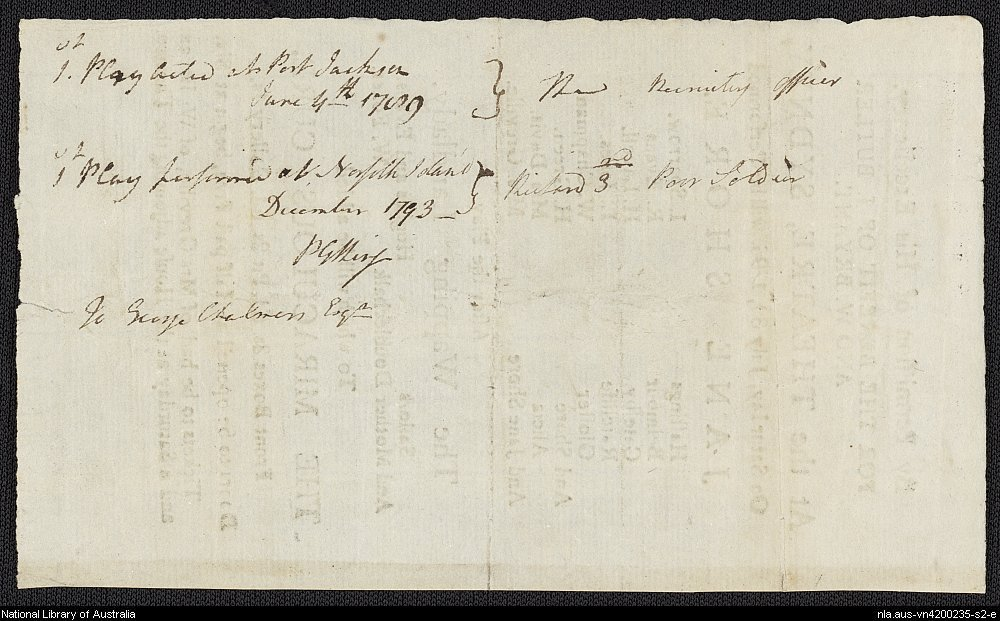
Reverse side of the above play bill, signed by Philip Gidley King (pre Governor of NSW)

In 1796 Sidaway, opened a 120-seat theatre in Bell Row, (now Bligh Street), Sydney. 30 July 1796, by permission of His Excellency, John Hunter, the play Jane Shore, (written by the English playwright and poet laureate Nicholas Rowe in 1714), was put on for the benefit of J. Butler and W. Bryant. Entry was gained by paying for front boxes 3s.6d. Pit 2s.6d. Gallery 1s., or the equivalent in flour, meat or spirits. By 1800 Sidaway presented Shakespeare and other contemporary English pieces. Sometime in 1800 the theatre was closed as a corrupting influence by the authorities.

== Land ==
Sidaway held 120 acres (0.49 km^{2}) of land at the Field of Mars, on which he grew 43 acres (0.17 km^{2}) of maize and wheat. The land was granted July 1795 by William Paterson.

Sidaway also had a shared 30 acres (0.12 km^{2}) of property with James Roberts at Mulgrave Place in the Hawkesbury District. 11 acres (0.04 km^{2}) of which was used for the growing of wheat. Livestock held on the property was 2 boars and 6 swines. The Muster of 1800 - 1802 states there were 2 males off government stores, 1 Female on government stores and 2 free servants off government stores on the property.

Hunter permitted Sidaway to buy goods at moderate prices from the Convict vessel Minerva when it arrived on 11 January 1800. He kept a public house and in 1805 obtained a wine and spirit licence. July 1806, Sidaway received issue of beer at Sydney. The Sydney Gazette, dated 26 February 1809 has Sidaway on list of persons granted a renewal of licence to sell wine and spirits.

== Philanthropist ==
Sidaway was known for being a philanthropist, after he was pardoned in 1794. Sidaway cared for an orphan named Elizabeth Mann, until her death in October 1806;

Same day died at the house of Mr. Robert Sidaway, Elizabeth Mann, an orphan aged 17 years, during the latter 5 of which she had laboured under the joint afflictions of insanity and a severe paralytic affection by which she was deprived of speech, and rendered perfectly helpless. Her long protracted sufferings have been subject of grievous contemplation to many, who but six years since remembered her no less remarkable for her vivacity and placid disposition than for her subsequent excessive toils upon the bed of anguish: And yet Providence did not totally relinquish its protection to an unfortunate daughter of adversity: in the benevolence of a friend she found an asylum, a careful guardian, and an ample ministration to her necessities, until it was the will of Heaven to terminate her sufferings.

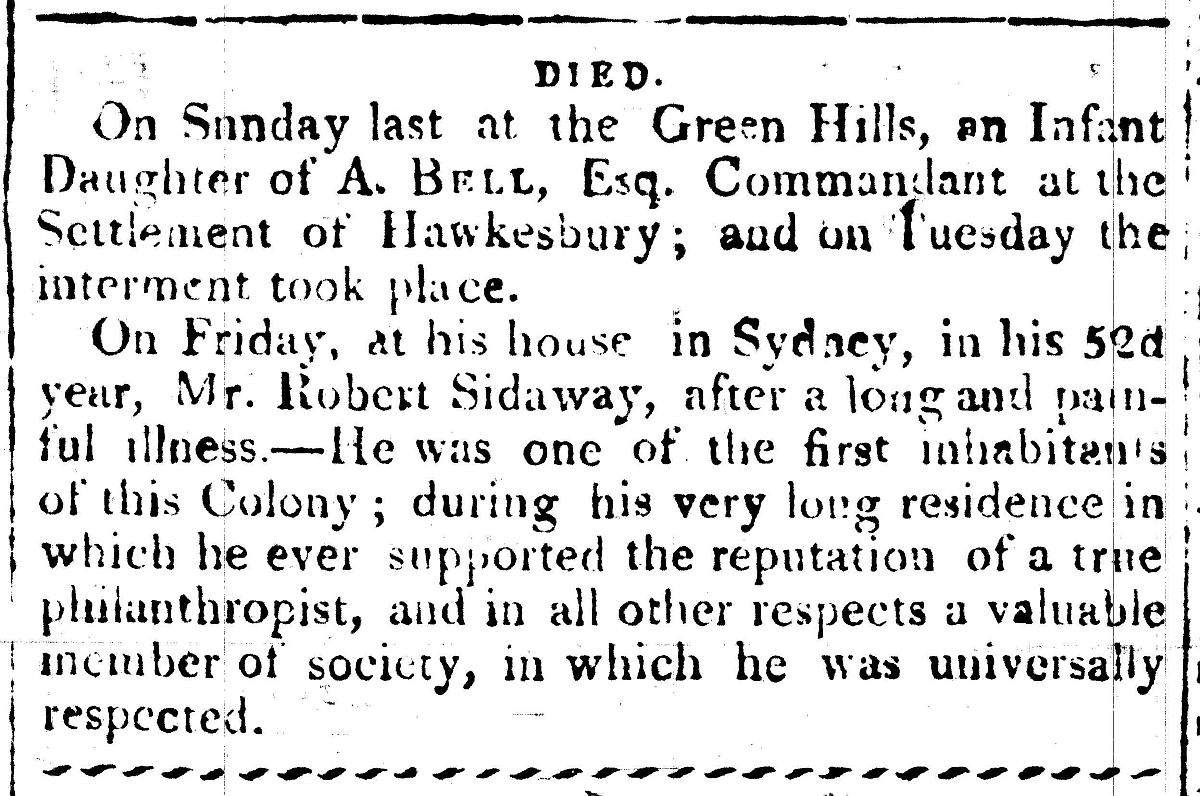
Death notice of Robert Sidaway from the Sydney Gazette and New South Wales Advertiser. Dated 15 October 1809.

On 4 June 1809 Sidaway was on list of persons donating to the fund to enclose a burial ground. A donation of £1 1s. was made to this subscription.

== Death ==
Sidaway had a de facto spouse, by the name of Mary Marshall (d. 1849). Marshall had been sentenced to transportation for life at the Old Bailey on 23 February 1785 and had arrived in the First Fleet in the Lady Penrhyn. Sidaway died on 13 October 1809, described by the Sydney Gazette as a philanthropist and a respected member of society. Mary Marshall was granted administratrix of all of Sidaway's land and effects. As Sidaway's residuary legatee, she sent Governor Macquarie a memorial applying for a renewal of the lease on Sidaway's property in Sydney, but this was refused. She continued in Sydney as a publican.

== See also ==
- List of convicts transported to Australia
