= Arthur Phillip =

Royal Navy Admiral and colonial administrator (1738–1814)

Admiral Arthur Phillip
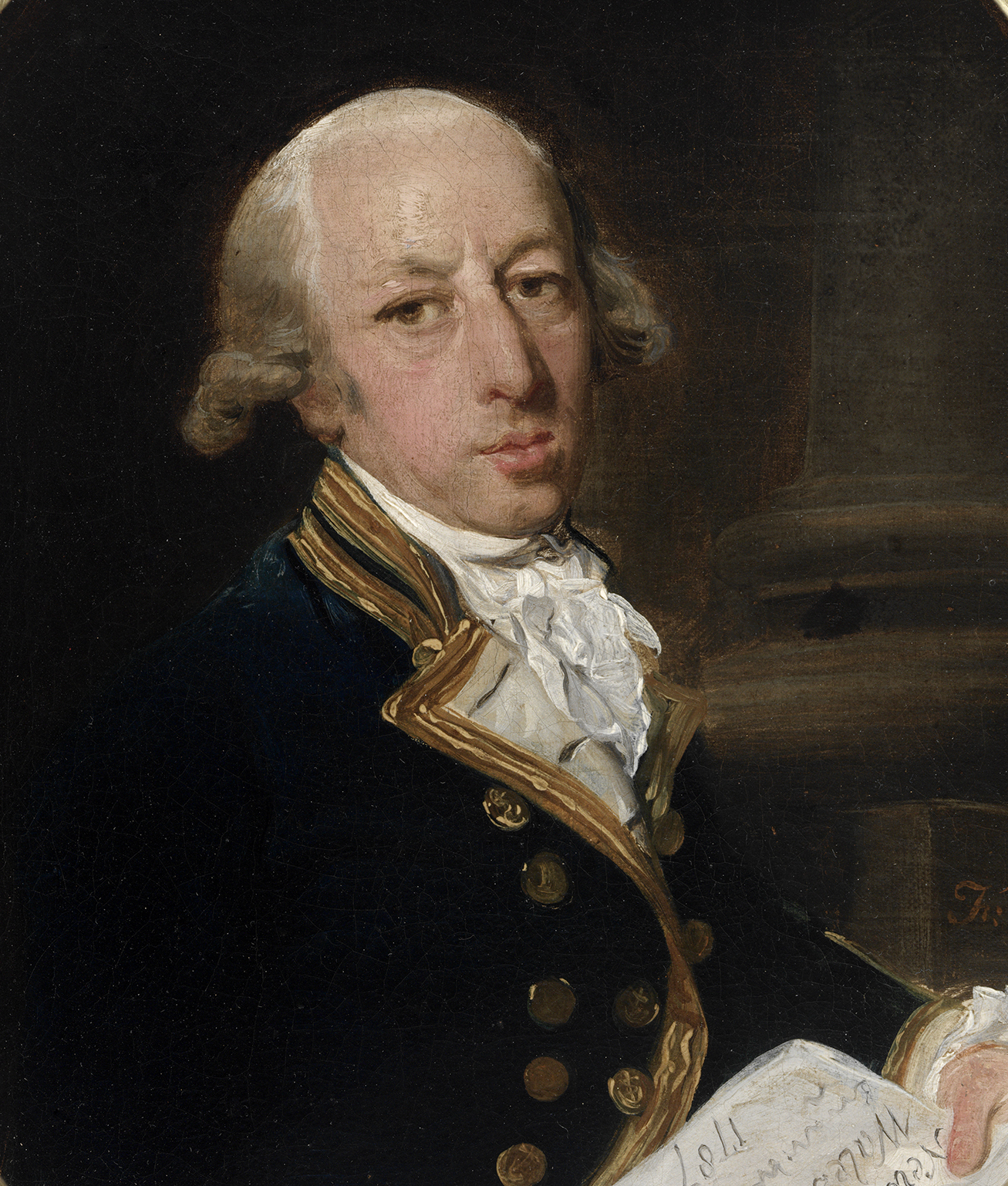
- Portrait by Francis Wheatley, 1786

1st Governor of New South Wales
- In office 7 February 1788 – 10 December 1792
- Monarch: George III
- Preceded by: Position established
- Succeeded by: John Hunter

Personal details
- Born: 11 October 1738 Cheapside, London, England
- Died: 31 August 1814 (aged 75) Bath, Somerset, England

Military service
- Allegiance: Kingdom of Great Britain; Kingdom of Portugal
- Branch/service: Royal Navy; Portuguese Navy
- Years of service: 1755–1774; 1778–1814; 1774–1778
- Rank: Admiral of the Blue
- Battles/wars: Seven Years' War; Battle of Minorca; Raid on St Malo; Siege of Havana; Spanish-Portuguese War; American Revolutionary War

Arthur Phillip (11 October 1738 – 31 August 1814) was a Royal Navy officer who served as the first governor of the Colony of New South Wales.

Phillip was educated at Greenwich Hospital School from June 1751 until December 1753. He then became an apprentice on the whaling ship Fortune. With the outbreak of the Seven Years' War against France, Phillip enlisted in the Royal Navy as captain's servant to Michael Everitt aboard HMS Buckingham. With Everitt, Phillip also served on HMS Union and HMS Stirling Castle. Phillip was promoted to lieutenant on 7 June 1761, before being put on half-pay at the end of hostilities on 25 April 1763. Seconded to the Portuguese Navy in 1774, he served in the war against Spain. Returning to Royal Navy service in 1778, in 1782 Phillip, in command of HMS Europa, was to capture Spanish colonies in South America, but an armistice was concluded before he reached his destination. In 1784, Phillip was employed by Home Office Under Secretary Evan Nepean, to survey French defences in Europe.

In 1786, Phillip was appointed by Lord Sydney as the commander of the First Fleet, a fleet of 11 ships whose crew were to establish a penal colony and a settlement at Botany Bay, New South Wales. On arriving at Botany Bay, Phillip found the site unsuitable and searched for a more habitable site for a settlement, which he found in Port Jackson – the site of Sydney, Australia, today. Phillip was a far-sighted governor who soon realised that New South Wales would need a civil administration and a system for emancipating convicts. However, his plan to bring skilled tradesmen on the First Fleet's voyage had been rejected. Consequently, he faced immense problems with labour, discipline, and supply. Phillip wanted harmonious relations with the local indigenous peoples, in the belief that everyone in the colony was a British citizen and was protected by the law as such; therefore the indigenous peoples had the same rights as everyone under Phillip's command. Eventually, cultural differences between the two groups of people led to conflict. The arrival of more convicts with the Second and Third Fleets placed new pressures on scarce local resources. By the time Phillip sailed home in December 1792, the colony was taking shape, with official land grants, systematic farming, and a water supply in place.

On 11 December 1792, Phillip left the colony to return to Britain to receive medical treatment for kidney stones. He had planned to return to Australia, but medical advisors recommended he resign from the governorship. His health recovered and he returned to active duty in the Navy in 1796, holding a number of commands in home waters before being put in command of the Hampshire Sea Fencibles. He eventually retired from active naval service in 1805. He spent his final years of retirement in Bath, Somerset, before his death on 31 August 1814. As the first Governor of New South Wales, a number of places in Australia are named after him, including Port Phillip, Phillip Island, Phillip Street in the Sydney central business district, the suburb of Phillip in Canberra and the Governor Phillip Tower building in Sydney, as well as many streets, parks, and schools.

== Early life ==
Arthur Phillip was born on 11 October 1738, in the Parish of All Hallows, in Bread Street, London. He was the son of Jacob Phillip, an immigrant from Frankfurt, who by various accounts was a language teacher, a merchant vessel owner, a merchant captain, or a common seaman. His mother, Elizabeth Breach, was the widow of a common seaman by the name of John Herbert, who had died of disease in Jamaica aboard HMS Tartar on 13 August 1732. At the time of Arthur Phillip's birth, his family maintained a modest existence as tenants near Cheapside in the City of London.

There are no surviving records of Phillip's early childhood. His father, Jacob, died in 1739, after which the Phillip family would have a low income. Arthur went to sea on a British naval vessel aged nine. On 22 June 1751, he was accepted into the Greenwich Hospital School, a charity school for the sons of indigent seafarers. In accordance with the school's curriculum, his education focused on literacy, arithmetic, and navigational skills, including cartography. His headmaster, Reverend Francis Swinden, observed that in personality, Phillip was "unassuming, reasonable, business-like to the smallest degree in everything he undertakes".

Phillip remained at the Greenwich Hospital School for two and a half years, longer than the average student stay of one year. At the end of 1753, he was granted a seven-year indenture as an apprentice aboard Fortune, a 210-ton whaling vessel commanded by merchant mariner William Readhead. Phillip left the Greenwich Hospital School on 1 December, and spent the next few months aboard the Fortune, awaiting the start of the 1754 whaling season.

Contemporary portraits depict Phillip as shorter than average, with an olive complexion and dark eyes. A long nose and a pronounced lower lip dominated his "smooth pear of a skull" as quoted by Robert Hughes.

== Early maritime career ==
=== Whaling and merchant expeditions ===
In April 1754 Fortune headed out to hunt whales near Svalbard in the Barents Sea. As an apprentice Phillip's responsibilities included stripping blubber from whale carcasses and helping to pack it into barrels. Food was scarce, and Fortune's 30 crew members supplemented their diet with bird's eggs, scurvy grass, and, where possible, reindeer. The ship returned to England on 20 July 1754. The whaling crew were paid and replaced with twelve sailors for a winter voyage to the Mediterranean. Phillip remained aboard as Fortune undertook an outward trading voyage to Barcelona and Livorno carrying salt and raisins, returning via Rotterdam with a cargo of grains and citrus. The ship returned to England in April 1755 and sailed immediately for Svalbard for that year's whale hunt. Phillip was still a member of the crew but abandoned his apprenticeship when the ship returned to England on 27 July.

=== Royal Navy and the Seven Years' War ===
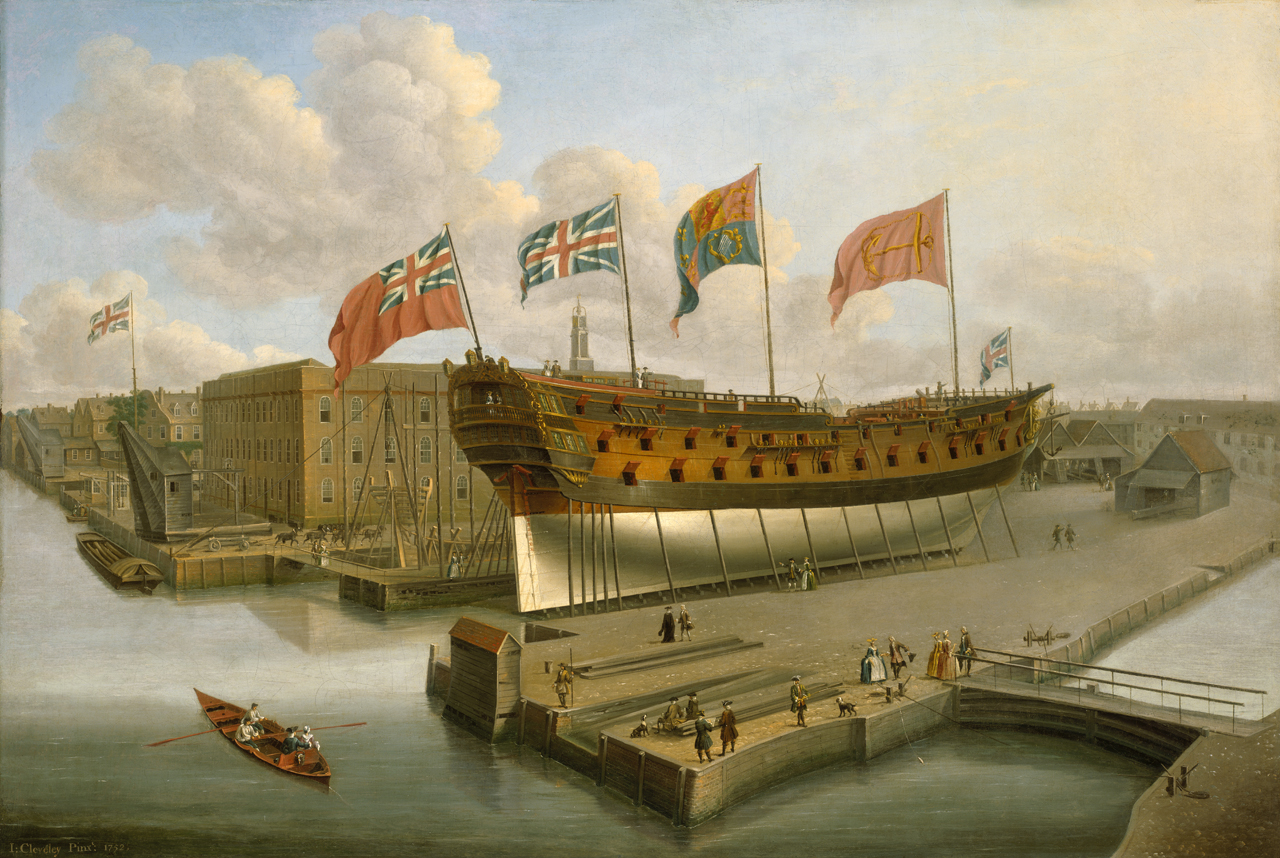
HMS Buckingham, Phillip's first posting after joining the Navy in 1755. Vessel pictured on the stocks at Deptford Dockyard on the River Thames, c. 1751. Painting by John Cleveley the Elder. National Maritime Museum, London.

On 16 October 1755, Phillip enlisted in the Royal Navy as captain's servant aboard the 68-gun HMS Buckingham, commanded by his mother's cousin, Captain Michael Everitt. As a member of Buckingham's crew, Phillip served in home waters until April 1756 and then joined Admiral John Byng's Mediterranean fleet. The Buckingham was Rear-Admiral Temple West's flagship at the Battle of Minorca on 20 May 1756.

Phillip moved on 1 August 1757, with Everitt, to the 90-gun HMS Union, which took part in the Raid on St Malo on 5–12 June 1758. Phillip, again with Captain Everitt, transferred on 28 December 1758 to the 64-gun HMS Stirling Castle, which went to the West Indies to serve at the Siege of Havana. On 7 June 1761, Phillip was commissioned as a lieutenant in recognition for his active service. With the coming of peace on 25 April 1763, he was retired on half-pay.

=== Retirement and the Portuguese Navy ===
In July 1763, Phillip married Margaret Charlotte Denison (née Tibbott), known as Charlott, a widow 16 years his senior, and moved to Glasshayes in Lyndhurst, Hampshire, establishing a farm there. The marriage was unhappy, and the couple separated in 1769 when Phillip returned to the Navy. Margaret Phillip died in August 1792 and is buried at Llanycil, Bala, North Wales with her companion, Mrs Cane. The following year, he was posted as second lieutenant aboard HMS Egmont, a newly built 74-gun ship of the line.

In 1774, Phillip was seconded to the Portuguese Navy as a captain, serving in the war against Spain. While with the Portuguese Navy, Phillip commanded a 26-gun frigate, Nossa Senhora do Pilar. On that ship, he took a detachment of troops from Rio de Janeiro to Colonia do Sacramento on the Río de la Plata (opposite Buenos Aires) to relieve the garrison there. The voyage also conveyed a consignment of convicts assigned to carry out work at Colonia. During a storm encountered in the course of the voyage, the convicts assisted in working the ship, and on arriving at Colonia, Phillip recommended that they be rewarded for saving the ship by remission of their sentences. A garbled version of this recommendation eventually found its way into the English press in 1786, when Phillip was appointed to lead the expedition to Sydney. Phillip played a leading role in the capture of the Spanish ship San Agustín, on 19 April 1777, off Santa Catarina. The Portuguese Navy commissioned her as the Santo Agostinho, under Phillip's command. The action was reported in the English press:

Madrid, 28 Aug. Letters from Lisbon bring the following Account from Rio Janeiro: That the St. Augustine, of 70 Guns, having been separated from the Squadron of M. Casa Tilly, was attacked by two Portugueze Ships, against which they defended themselves for a Day and a Night, but being next Day surrounded by the Portugueze Fleet, was obliged to surrender.

=== Recommissioned into Royal Navy ===
[Phillip] is an officer of education and principle, he gives way to reason and does not, before doing so fall into exaggerated and unbearable excesses of temper ... he is very clean-handed; is an officer of great truth and very brave; and is no flatterer, saying what he thinks but without temper or want of respect.

— Correspondence of Luís, 2nd Marquis Lavradio, Viceroy of Brazil, 1778.

In 1778, with Britain again at war, Phillip was recalled to Royal Navy service and on 9 October was appointed first lieutenant of the 74-gun HMS Alexander as part of the Channel fleet. Promoted to commander on 2 September 1779 and given command of the 8-gun fireship HMS Basilisk. With Spain's entry into the conflict, Phillip had a series of private meetings with the First Lord of the Admiralty, the Earl of Sandwich, sharing his charts and knowledge about the South American coastlines.

Phillip was promoted to post-captain on 30 November 1781 and given command of the 20-gun HMS Ariadne. Ariadne was sent to the Elbe to escort a transport ship carrying a detachment of Hanoverian troops, arriving at the port of Cuxhaven on 28 December, the estuary froze over trapping Ariadne in the harbour. In March 1782, Phillip arrived in England with the Hanoverian troops. In the following months Ariadne got a new lieutenant, Philip Gidley King, whom Phillip took under his wing. Ariadne was used to patrol the Channel where on 30 June, she captured the French frigate Le Robecq.

With a change of government on 27 March 1782, Sandwich retired from the Admiralty, Lord Germain was replaced as Secretary of State for Home and American Affairs by Earl of Shelburne, before 10 July 1782, in another change of government Thomas Townshend replaced him, and assumed responsibility for organising an expedition against Spanish America. Like Sandwich and Germain, he turned to Phillip for planning advice. The plan was for a squadron of three ships of the line and a frigate to mount a raid on Buenos Aires and Monte Video, then to proceed to the coasts of Chile, Peru, and Mexico to maraud, and ultimately to cross the Pacific to join the British Navy's East India squadron for an attack on Manila. On 27 December 1782, Phillip, took charge of the 64-gun HMS Europa. The expedition, consisting of the 70-gun HMS Grafton, the 74-gun HMS Elizabeth, Europa, and the 32-gun frigate HMS Iphigenia, sailed on 16 January 1783 under the command of Commodore Robert Kingsmill. Shortly after the ships' departure, an armistice was concluded between Great Britain and Spain. Phillip learnt of this in April when he put in for storm repairs at Rio de Janeiro. Phillip wrote to Townshend from Rio de Janeiro on 25 April 1783, expressing his disappointment that the ending of the American War had robbed him of the opportunity for naval glory in South America.

=== Survey work in Europe ===
After his return to England in April 1784, Phillip remained in close contact with Townshend, now Lord Sydney, and Home Office Under Secretary Evan Nepean. From October 1784 to September 1786, Nepean, who was in charge of the Secret Service relating to the Bourbon Powers, France, and Spain, employed him to spy on the French naval arsenals at Toulon and other ports. There was fear that Britain would soon be at war with these powers as a consequence of the Batavian Revolution in the Netherlands.

== Colonial service ==
Lord Sandwich, together with the president of the Royal Society, Sir Joseph Banks, the scientist who had accompanied Lieutenant James Cook on his 1770 voyage, was advocating the establishment of a British colony in Botany Bay, New South Wales. Banks accepted an offer of assistance from the American loyalist James Matra in July 1783. Under Banks' guidance, Matra rapidly produced "A Proposal for Establishing a Settlement in New South Wales" (24 August 1783), with a fully developed set of reasons for a colony composed of American loyalists, Chinese, and South Sea Islanders (but not convicts). Thomas Townshend, Lord Sydney, as Secretary of State for the Home Office and minister in charge, decided to establish the proposed colony in Australia. This decision was taken for two reasons: the ending of the option to transport criminals to North America following the American Revolution, and the need for a base in the Pacific to counter French expansion.

In September 1786, Phillip was appointed commodore of the fleet, which came to be known as the First Fleet. His assignment was to transport convicts and soldiers to establish a colony at Botany Bay. Upon arriving there, Phillip was to assume the powers of captain general and governor in chief of the new colony. A subsidiary colony was to be founded on Norfolk Island, as recommended by Sir John Call and Sir George Young, to take advantage of that island's native flax (harakeke) and timber for naval purposes.

=== Voyage to Colony of New South Wales ===
On 25 October 1786, the 20-gun HMS Sirius, lying in the dock at Deptford, was commissioned, with the command given to Phillip. The armed tender HMAT Supply (often confused with HMS Supply), under the command of Lieutenant Henry Lidgbird Ball, was also commissioned to join the expedition. On 15 December, Captain John Hunter was assigned as second captain to Sirius to command in the absence of Phillip, who as governor of the colony, would be where the seat of government was to be fixed.

The fleet of 11 ships and about 1,500 people, under Phillip's command, sailed from Portsmouth, England, on 13 May 1787; HMS Hyaena provided an escort out of British waters. On 3 June 1787, the fleet anchored at Santa Cruz, Tenerife. On 10 June they set sail to cross the Atlantic to Rio de Janeiro, taking advantage of favourable trade winds and ocean currents. The Fleet reached Rio de Janeiro on 5 August and stayed for a month to resupply. The Fleet left Rio de Janeiro on 4 September to run before the westerlies to Table Bay in Southern Africa, which it reached on 13 October; this was the last port of call before Botany Bay. On 25 November, Phillip transferred from the Sirius to the faster Supply, and with the faster ships of the fleet hastened ahead to prepare for the arrival of the rest of the fleet. However, this "flying squadron", as Frost called it, reached Botany Bay only hours before the rest of the Fleet, so no preparatory work was possible. Supply reached Botany Bay on 18 January 1788; the three fastest transports in the advance group arrived on 19 January; slower ships, including Sirius, arrived on 20 January.

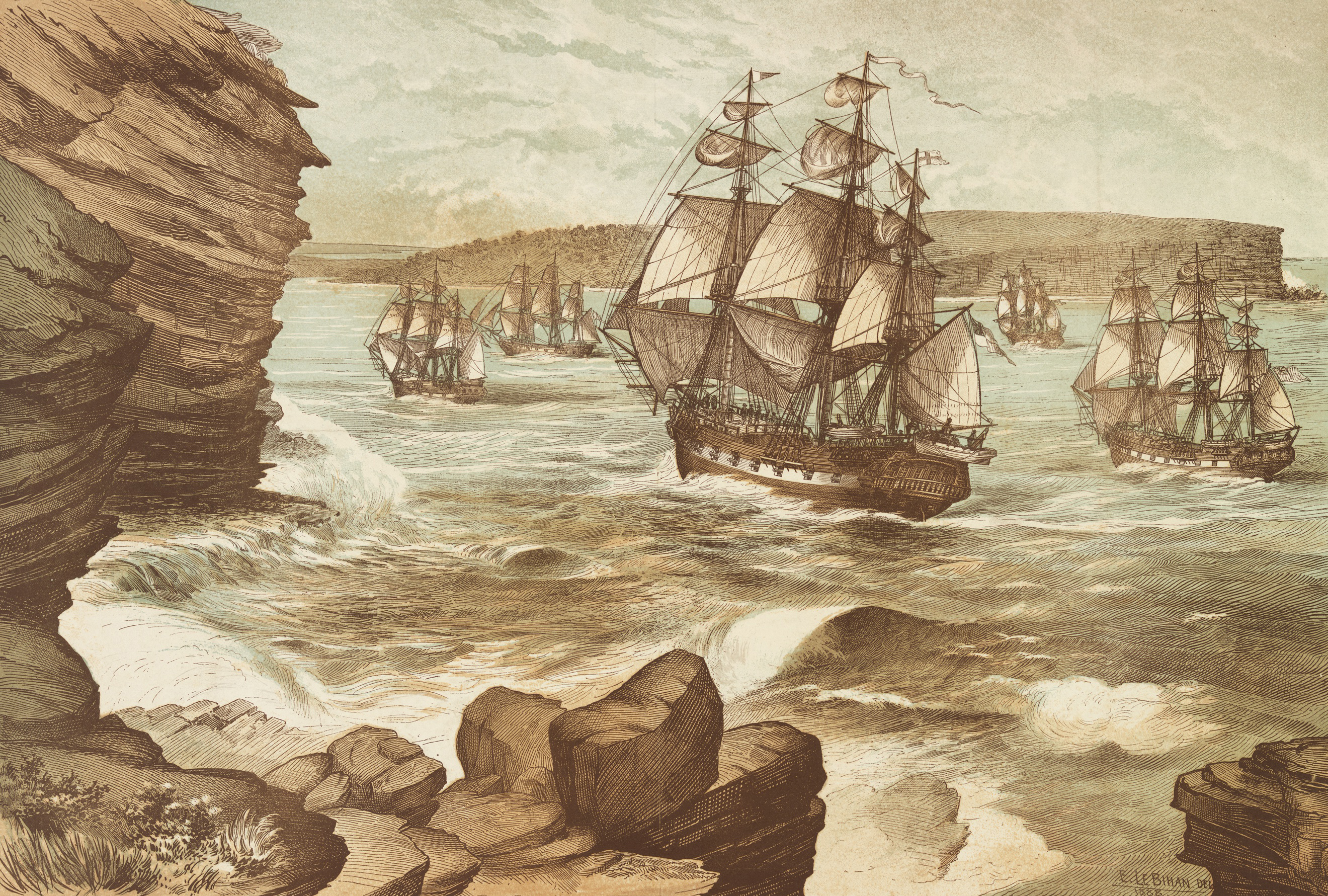
The landing of the First Fleet in Port Jackson, Australia in 1788

Phillip soon decided that the site, chosen on the recommendation of Sir Joseph Banks, who had accompanied James Cook in 1770, was not suitable, since it had poor soil, no secure anchorage, and no reliable water source. Cook was an explorer and Banks had a scientific interest, whereas Phillip's differing assessment of the site came from his perspective as, quoted by Tyrrell, "custodian of over a thousand convicts" for whom he was responsible. After some exploration, Phillip decided to go on to Port Jackson, and on 26 January, the marines and the convicts landed at a cove, which Phillip named for Lord Sydney. This date later became Australia's national day, Australia Day. Governor Phillip formally proclaimed the colony on 7 February 1788 in Sydney. Sydney Cove offered a fresh water supply and a safe harbour, which Phillip famously described as: "being with out exception the finest Harbour in the World [...] Here a Thousand Sail of the Line may ride in the most perfect Security."

=== Establishing a settlement ===
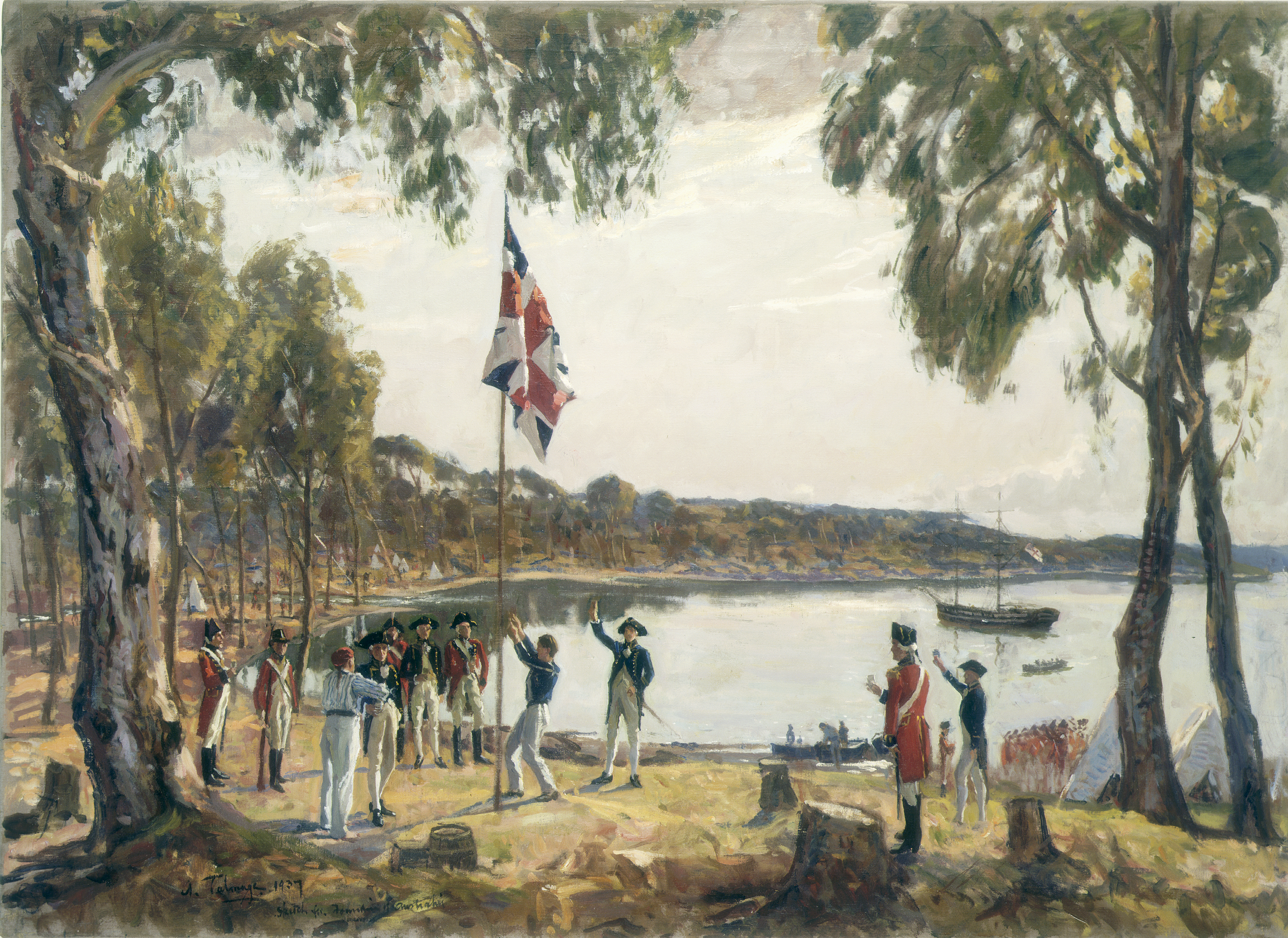
The Founding of Australia By Capt. Arthur Phillip R.N., Sydney Cove, Jan. 26th 1788. Painting by Algernon Talmage, 1937.

On 26 January, the Union Jack was raised, and possession of the land was taken formally in the name of King George III. The next day, sailors from Sirius, a party of marines, and a number of male convicts were disembarked to fell timber and clear the ground for the erection of tents. The remaining large company of male convicts disembarked from the transports over the following days. Phillip himself structured the ordering of the camp. His own tent as governor and those of his attendant staff and servants were set on the east side of Tank Stream, with the tents of the male convicts and marines on the west. During this time, priority was given to building permanent storehouses for the settlement's provisions. On 29 January, the governor's portable house was placed, and livestock were landed the next day. The female convicts disembarked on 6 February; the general camp for the women was to the north of the governor's house and separated from the male convicts by the houses of chaplain Richard Johnson and the Judge Advocate, Marine Captain David Collins. On 7 February 1788, Phillip and his government were formally inaugurated.

On 15 February 1788, Phillip sent Lieutenant Philip Gidley King with a party of 23, including 15 convicts, to establish the colony at Norfolk Island, partly in response to a perceived threat of losing the island to the French, and partly to establish an alternative food source for the mainland colony.

=== Governor of New South Wales ===
When Phillip was appointed as governor-designate of the colony and began to plan the expedition, he requested that the convicts that were being sent be trained; only twelve carpenters and a few men who knew anything about agriculture were sent. Seamen with technical and building skills were commandeered immediately.

Phillip established a civil administration, with courts of law, that applied to everyone living in the settlement. Two convicts, Henry and Susannah Kable, sought to sue Duncan Sinclair, the captain of the Alexander, for stealing their possessions during the voyage. Sinclair, believing that as convicts they had no protection from the law, as was the case in Britain, boasted that he could not be sued. Despite this, the court found for the plaintiffs and ordered the captain to make restitution for the theft of the Kables' possessions.

Phillip had drawn up a detailed memorandum of his plans for the proposed new colony. In one paragraph he wrote: "The laws of this country [England] will of course, be introduced in [New] South Wales, and there is one that I would wish to take place from the moment his Majesty's forces take possession of the country: That there can be no slavery in a free land, and consequently no slaves." Nevertheless, Phillip believed in severe discipline; floggings and hangings were commonplace, although Phillip commuted many death sentences. The settlement's supplies were rationed equally to convicts, officers, and marines, and females were given two-thirds of the weekly males' rations. In late February, six convicts were brought before the criminal court for stealing supplies. They were sentenced to death; the ringleader, Thomas Barrett, was hanged that day. Phillip gave the rest a reprieve. They were banished to an island in the harbour and given only bread and water.

The governor also expanded the settlement's knowledge of the landscape. Two officers from Sirius, Captain John Hunter and Lieutenant William Bradley, conducted a thorough survey of the harbour at Sydney Cove. Phillip later joined them on an expedition to survey Broken Bay.

The fleet's ships left over the next months, with Sirius and Supply remaining in the colony under command of the governor. They were used to survey and map the coastlines and waterways. Scurvy broke out, so Sirius left Port Jackson for Cape Town under the command of Hunter in October 1788, having been sent for supplies. The voyage, which completed a circumnavigation, returned to Sydney Cove in April, just in time to save the near-starving colony.

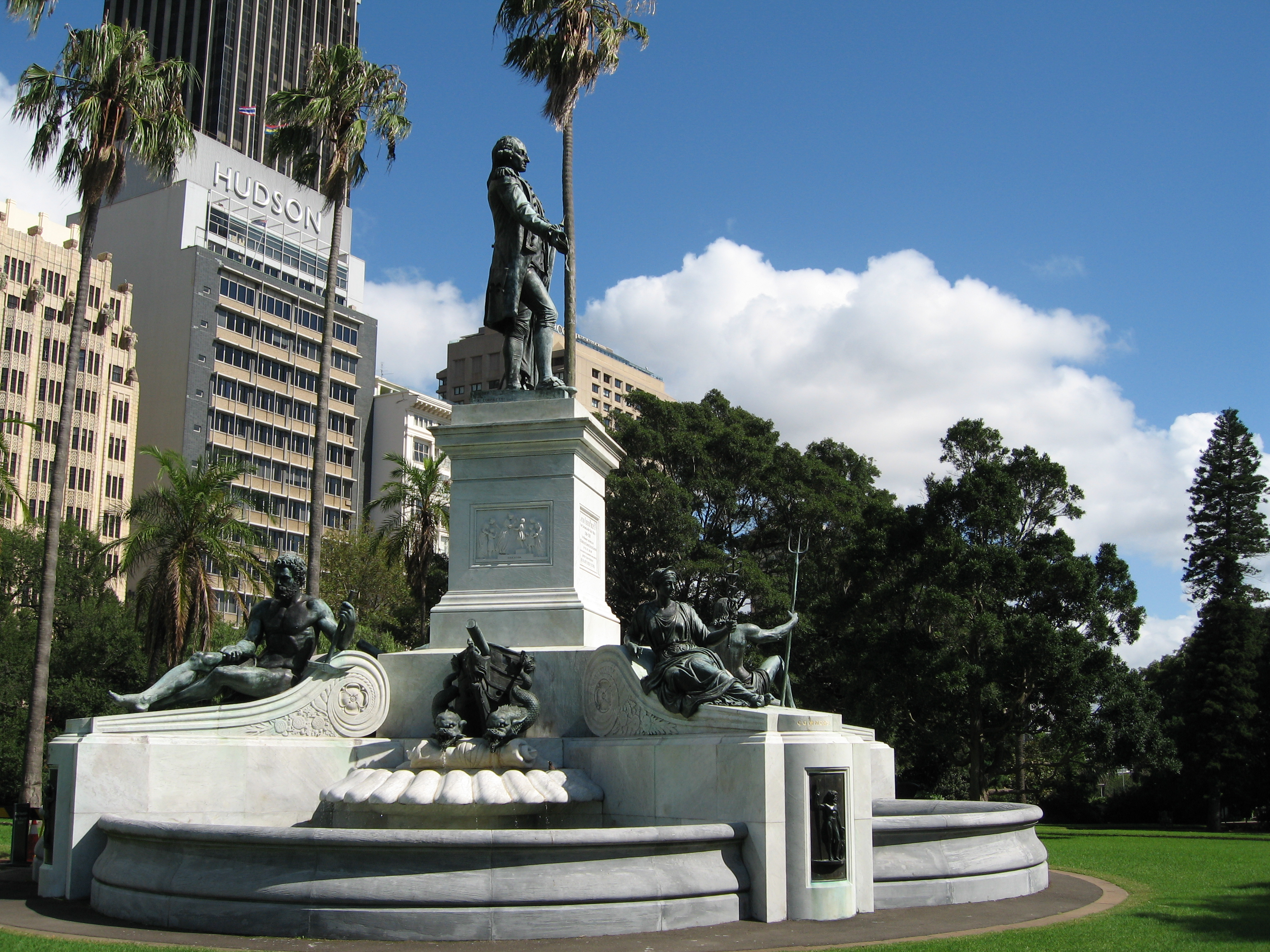
Statue of Arthur Phillip in the Royal Botanic Gardens, Sydney

As an experienced farmhand, Phillip's appointed servant Henry Edward Dodd, served as farm superintendent at Farm Cove, where he successfully cultivated the first crops, later moving to Rose Hill, where the soil was better. James Ruse, a convict, was later appointed to the position after Dodd died in 1791. When Ruse succeeded in the farming endeavours, he received the colony's first land grant.

In June 1790, more convicts arrived with the Second Fleet, but HMS Guardian, carrying more supplies, was disabled en route after hitting an iceberg, leaving the colony low on provisions again. Supply, the only ship left under colonial command after Sirius was wrecked 19 March 1790 trying to land men and supplies on Norfolk Island, was sent to Batavia for supplies. The colony's isolation meant that it took almost two years for Phillip to receive replies to his dispatches from his superiors in London.

In late 1792, Phillip, whose health was suffering, relinquished the governorship to Major Francis Grose, lieutenant-governor and commander of New South Wales Corps. On 11 December 1792, Phillip left for Britain, on the Atlantic, which had arrived with convicts of the Third Fleet. Phillip was unable to follow his original intention of returning to Port Jackson once his health was restored, as medical advice compelled him to resign formally on 23 July 1793.

=== Military personnel in colony ===
The main challenge for order and harmony in the settlement came not from the convicts secured there on terms of good behaviour, but from the attitude of officers from the New South Wales Marine Corps. As Commander in Chief, Phillip was in command of both the naval and marine forces; his naval officers readily obeyed his commands, but a measure of co-operation from the marine officers ran against their tradition. Major Robert Ross and his officers (with the exception of a few such as David Collins, Watkin Tench, and William Dawes) refused to do anything other than guard duty, claiming that they were neither gaolers, supervisors, nor policemen.

Four companies of marines, consisting of 160 privates with 52 officers and NCO's, accompanied the First Fleet to Botany Bay. In addition, there were 34 officers and men serving in the Ship's Complement of Marines aboard Sirius and Supply, bringing the total to 246 who departed England.

Ross supported and encouraged his fellow officers in their conflicts with Phillip, engaged in clashes of his own, and complained of the governor's actions to the Home Office. Phillip, more placid and forbearing in temperament, was anxious in the interests of the community as a whole to avoid friction between the civil and military authorities. Though firm in his attitude, he endeavoured to placate Ross, but to little effect. In the end, he solved the problem by ordering Ross to Norfolk Island on 5 March 1790 to replace the commandant there.

Beginning with guards arriving with the Second and Third fleets, but officially with the arrival of HMS Gorgon on 22 September 1791, the New South Wales Marines were relieved by a newly formed British Army regiment of foot, the New South Wales Corps. On 18 December 1791, Gorgon left Port Jackson, taking home the larger part of the still-serving New South Wales Marines. There remained in New South Wales a company of active marines serving under Captain George Johnston, who had been Phillip's aide-de-camp, that transferred to the New South Wales Corps. Also remaining in the colony were discharged marines, many of whom became settlers. The official departure of the last serving marines from the colony was in December 1792, with Governor Phillip on Atlantic.

Major Francis Grose, commander of the New South Wales Corps, had replaced Ross as the Lieutenant-Governor and took over command of the colony when Phillip returned to Britain.

=== Relations with indigenous peoples ===
Phillip's official orders with regard to Aboriginal people were to "conciliate their affections", to "live in amity and kindness with them", and to punish anyone who should "wantonly destroy them, or give them any unnecessary interruption in the exercise of their several occupations". The first meeting between the colonists and the Eora, Aboriginal people, happened in Botany Bay. When Phillip went ashore, gifts were exchanged, thus Phillip and the officers began their relationship with the Eora through gift-giving, hilarity, and dancing, but also by showing them what their guns could do. Anyone found harming or killing Aboriginal people without provocation would be severely punished.

After the early meetings, dancing, and musket demonstrations, the Eora avoided the settlement in Sydney Cove for the first year, but they warned and then attacked whenever colonists trespassed on their lands away from the settlement. Part of Phillip's early plan for peaceful cohabitation had been to persuade some Eora, preferably a family, to come and live in the town with the British so that the colonists could learn about the Eora's language, beliefs, and customs.

By the end of the first year, as none of the Eora had come to live in the settlement, Phillip decided on a more ruthless strategy, and ordered the capture of some Eora warriors. The man who was captured was Arabanoo, from whom Phillip and his officers started to learn language and customs. Arabanoo died in April 1789 of smallpox, which also ravaged the rest of the Eora population. Phillip again ordered the boats to Manly Cove, where two more warriors were captured, Coleby and Bennelong; Coleby soon escaped, but Bennelong remained. Bennelong and Phillip formed a kind of friendship, before he too escaped.

Four months after Bennelong escaped from Sydney, Phillip was invited to a whale feast at Manly. Bennelong greeted him in a friendly and jovial way. Phillip was suddenly surrounded by warriors and speared in the shoulder by a man called Willemering. He ordered his men not to retaliate. Phillip, perhaps realising that the spearing was in retaliation for the kidnapping, ordered no actions to be taken over it. Friendly relations were reestablished afterwards, with Bennelong even returning to Sydney with his family.

Even though there were now friendly relations with the Indigenous people around Sydney Cove, the same couldn't be said about the ones around Botany Bay, who had killed or wounded 17 colonists. Phillip despatched orders, as quoted by Tench, "to put to death ten ... [and] cut off the heads of the slain ... to infuse a universal terror, which might operate to prevent further mischief". Even though two expeditions were despatched under command of Watkin Tench, no one was apprehended.

On 11 December 1792, when Phillip returned to Britain, Bennelong and another Aboriginal man named Yemmerrawanne (or Imeerawanyee) travelled with him on the Atlantic.

== Later life and death ==
Phillip's estranged wife, Charlott, died 3 August 1792 and was buried in St Beuno's Churchyard, Llanycil, Bala, Merionethshire. Phillip, a resident in Marylebone, married Isabella Whitehead of Bath in St Marylebone Parish Church, in the Church of England on 8 May 1794.

His health recovered, he was reappointed in March 1796 to command the 74-gun HMS Alexander as part of the Channel fleet. In October, his command was switched to the 74-gun HMS Swiftsure. In September 1797, Phillip was transferred again to the 90-gun HMS Blenheim, command of which he held until December of that year. During 1798–99, Phillip commanded the Hampshire Sea Fencibles, then appointed inspector of the Impress Service, in which capacity he and a secretary toured the outposts of Britain to report on the strengths of the various posts.

In the ordinary course of events he was promoted to Rear-Admiral on 1 January 1801. Phillip retired in 1805 from active service in the Navy, was promoted to Vice-Admiral on 13 December 1806, and received a final promotion to Admiral of the Blue on 4 June 1814.

Phillip suffered a stroke in 1808, which left him partially paralysed. He died 31 August 1814 at his residence, 19 Bennett Street, Bath. He was buried nearby at St Nicholas's Church, Bathampton. His Last Will and Testament has been transcribed and is online. Forgotten for many years, the grave was discovered in November 1897 by a young woman cleaning the church, who found the name after lifting matting from the floor; the historian James Bonwick had been searching Bath records for its location. An annual service of remembrance is held at the church around Phillip's birthdate by the Britain–Australia Society.

In 2007, Geoffrey Robertson alleged that Phillip's remains were no longer in St Nicholas Church, Bathampton, and had been lost: "Captain Arthur Phillip is not where the ledger stone says he is: it may be that he is buried somewhere outside, it may simply be that he is simply lost. But he is not where Australians have been led to believe that he now lies."

== Legacy ==
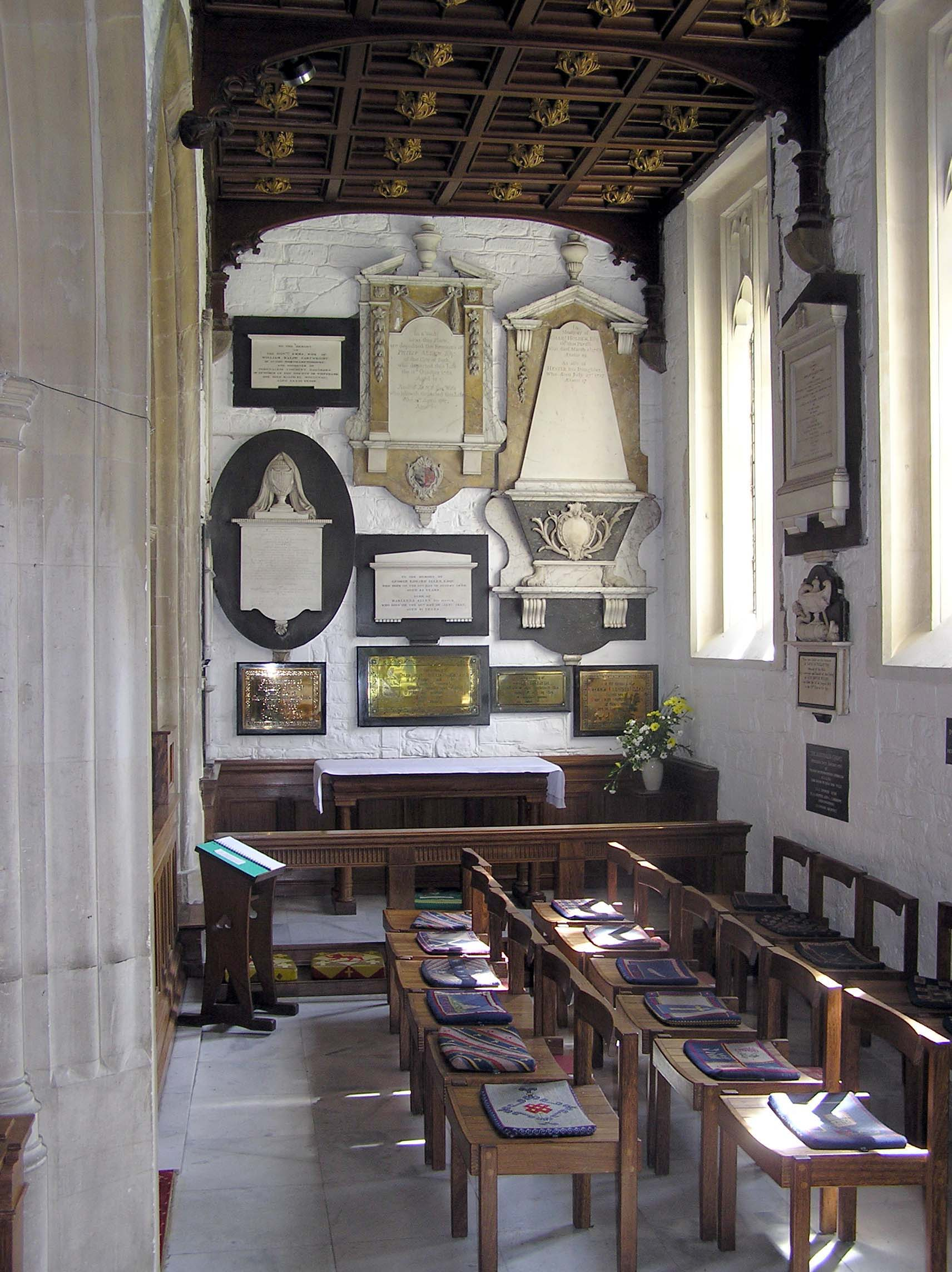
The Australia Chapel in St Nicholas Church, Bathampton, near Bath, England. The memorial to the first governor of New South Wales, Arthur Phillip, is on the right hand wall

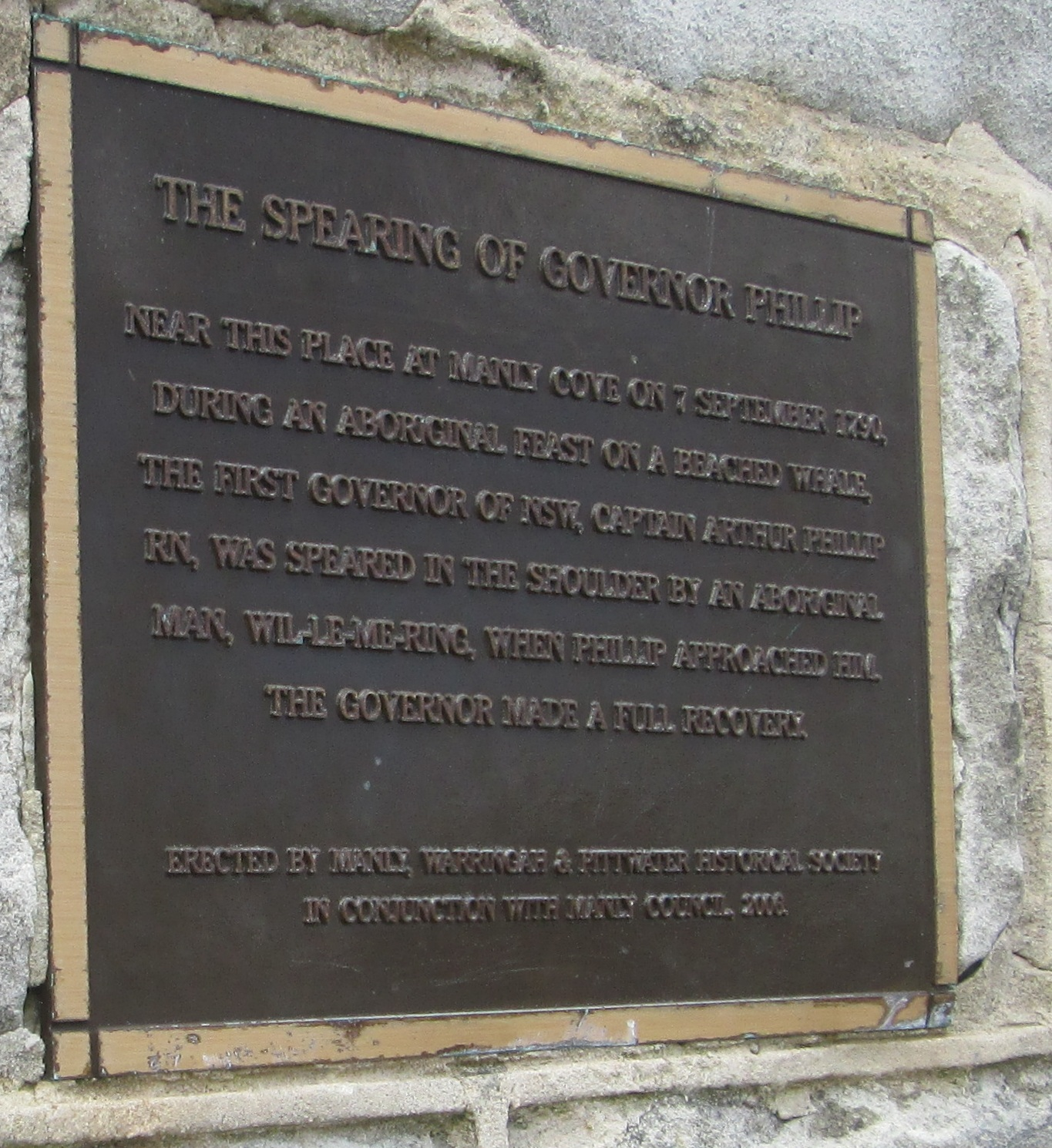
Manly Plaque

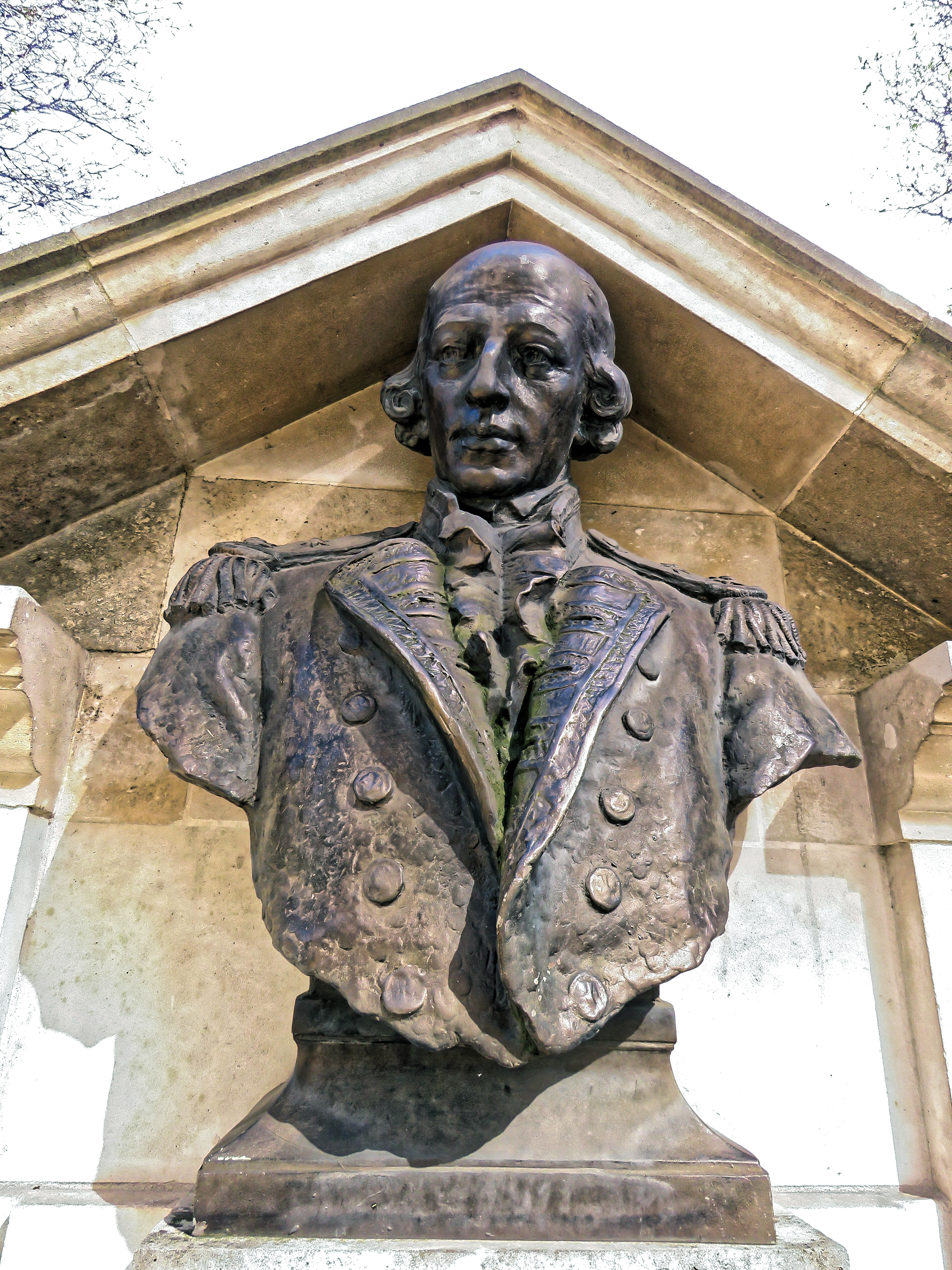
Admiral Arthur Phillip monument bust in the City of London

A number of places in Australia bear Phillip's name, including Port Phillip, Phillip Island (Victoria), Phillip Island (Norfolk Island), Phillip Street in the Sydney central business district, and St Phillip's Church, Sydney.

A monument to Phillip in Bath Abbey Church was unveiled in 1937. Another was unveiled at St Mildred's Church, Bread Street, London, in 1932; that church was destroyed in the London Blitz in 1940, but the principal elements of the monument were re-erected at the west end of Watling Street, near Saint Paul's Cathedral, in 1968. A different bust and memorial is inside the nearby church of St Mary-le-Bow. There is a memorial fountain honouring him in the Royal Botanical Gardens, Sydney. There is a 1786 portrait of him by Francis Wheatley in the National Portrait Gallery, London, and another by the same painter painted in 1787 in the Mitchell Library, State Library of New South Wales, Sydney.

Percival Serle wrote of Phillip in his Dictionary of Australian Biography:

Steadfast in mind, modest, without self seeking, Phillip had imagination enough to conceive what the settlement might become, and the common sense to realize what at the moment was possible and expedient. When almost everyone was complaining he never himself complained, when all feared disaster he could still hopefully go on with his work. He was sent out to found a convict settlement, he laid the foundations of a great dominion.

=== 200th anniversary ===
As part of a series of events on the bicentenary of his death, a memorial was dedicated in Westminster Abbey on 9 July 2014. In the service, the Dean of Westminster, Very Reverend Dr John Hall, described Phillip as follows: "This modest, yet world-class seaman, linguist, and patriot, whose selfless service laid the secure foundations on which was developed the Commonwealth of Australia, will always be remembered and honoured alongside other pioneers and inventors here in the Nave: David Livingstone, Thomas Cochrane, and Isaac Newton." A similar memorial was unveiled by the outgoing 37th Governor of New South Wales, Marie Bashir, in St James' Church, Sydney, on 31 August 2014. A bronze bust was installed at the Museum of Sydney, and a full-day symposium discussed his contributions to the founding of modern Australia.

=== Governor Phillip Trust and Scholarship ===
The Governor Phillip Scholarship was established in 2016. It is supported by the Governor Phillip Trust, which was established to honour Phillip's "legacy of nation building, rule of law, diplomacy, public health and defence of indigenous rights through learning, innovation and leadership". The scholarship and trust were established under the patronage the Governor of New South Wales, initially His Excellency General The Honourable David Hurley, Governor of New South Wales. As of 2026 the patron is present NSW Governor, Her Excellency the Honourable Margaret Beazley. The board is chaired by David Slessar OBE, and the trust is sponsored by a number of private individuals, foundations, and companies. The Governor Phillip Scholarship, which is open to Australian graduates, is worth A$140,000, which supports a fully-funded postgraduate degree at some of the world's leading universities, including all university and college fees as well as board and accommodation in halls of residence. Past scholars include Chanel Contos, founder of the website Teach Us Consent and author of Consent Laid Bare.

== In popular culture ==
Phillip has been played by a number of actors in movies and television programs, including:

- Frank Harvey in Heritage (1935)
- Sir Cedric Hardwicke in Botany Bay (1953)
- Edward Hepple in The Hungry Ones (1963)
- Wynn Roberts in Prelude to Harvest (1963)
- Peter Collingwood in The Timeless Land (1980)
- Sam Neill in The Incredible Journey of Mary Bryant (2005)
- David Wenham in Banished (2015)

He is a prominent character in Timberlake Wertenbaker's play Our Country's Good, in which he commissions Lieutenant Ralph Clark to stage a production of The Recruiting Officer. He is shown as compassionate and just, but receives little support from his fellow officers.

His life was the focus of I'll Meet You in Botany Bay, a 1945 radio play.

== See also ==
- Historical Records of Australia
- Journals of the First Fleet
- History of smallpox in Australia

Government offices
New district	Governor of New South Wales; 1788–1792	Succeeded by John Hunter
