= Our Country's Good =

Play by Timberlake Wertenbaker

- Dramatic Publishing Co. edition, 1989
- Written by: Timberlake Wertenbaker
- Original language: English
- Subject: Based on a true story of convicts rehearsing a play
- Genre: Drama
- Setting: 18th century, Sydney, Australia

Premiere
- Date premiered: 1988
- Place premiered: Royal Court Theatre; London, UK

Our Country's Good is a 1988 play written by British playwright Timberlake Wertenbaker, adapted from the Thomas Keneally novel The Playmaker. The story concerns a group of Royal Marines and convicts in a penal colony in New South Wales, in the 1780s, who put on a production of The Recruiting Officer.

It was first staged at the Royal Court Theatre, London, on 10 September 1988, directed by Max Stafford-Clark. It ran on Broadway in 1991.

== Background ==
In the 1780s, convicts and Royal Marines were sent to Australia as part of the first penal colony there. The play shows the class system in the convict camp and discusses themes such as sexuality, punishment, the Georgian judicial system, and the idea that it is possible for "theatre to be a humanising force".

As part of their research, Stafford-Clark and Wertenbaker went to see a play performed by convicts at Wormwood Scrubs, which proved inspiring. The convicts were, at least momentarily, civilized human beings, and they had taken their work very seriously.

Most of the characters in the play are based on real people who sailed with the First Fleet, though some have had their names changed. Wertenbaker was able to read the journals of First Fleet members in order to portray them accurately.

== Synopsis ==
In the hold of the convict ship Sirius, the convicts witness an (off-stage) flogging and express fear about their future. In Sydney Cove, an unnamed Aboriginal Australian witnesses the arrival of the first fleet. Throughout the play, he comments on the British settlement's effect on the indigenous populations, reacting with curiosity, confusion, and finally fear.

Some time after arriving in Sydney, Governor Arthur Philip, Captain David Collins, Captain Watkin Tench, and Midshipman Harry Brewer debate the purpose of prison: should it be to punish or rehabilitate?; and the nature of criminal tendencies: are they innate or acquired? When Tench mentions that the convicts consider hanging to be "entertainment," Philip wonders if they could be offered something else. He suggests that the convicts could stage a play, but nevertheless orders Harry to find a hangman and execute three men who have been convicted of stealing food.

After hanging two of the thieves, Harry is plagued by guilt, especially as one of the thieves, Handy Baker, was Harry's rival for the affection of Duckling Smith, a young convict woman. Harry tells Second Lieutenant Ralph Clark about the Governor's idea to have the convicts stage a play and Ralph decides to take this project on, hoping to get the Governor to notice him.

Ralph chooses George Farquhar's restoration comedy The Recruiting Officer and holds auditions. Some of the convicts who audition are Meg Long, an aged prostitute; Robert Sideway, a flamboyant pickpocket; the shy Mary Brenham; her more outspoken friend Dabby Bryant; and the hardened criminal Liz Morden. Ralph offers Mary the main female role of Silvia and reluctantly agrees that Dabby can play Rose. Liz Morden is offered the role of Melinda.

One evening, the officers discuss theatre, punishment, criminality and morality, and debate the value of Ralph's project. Major Ross, his acolyte Captain Campbell, and the pragmatic Captain Tench express conservative opinions and oppose the play, which is defended vehemently by Philip, Collins and Ralph Clark. Collins conducts a vote and with the majority in favour, Ralph is allowed to start rehearsals.

Duckling complains that Harry is always watching her, leaving her no freedom. To appease her, he says that he will let her take part in the play. Dabby and Mary start learning their lines. Mary feels inadequate to play a noble lady, as she is ashamed of having sold herself to a sailor on the ship for food. Dabby argues that Mary was no virgin and that she might otherwise not have survived the voyage. Liz interrupts them and demands to be included, but Dabby becomes resentful when it becomes clear that Liz can't read. Their fight is broken up by James “Ketch” Freeman, the hangman. Freeman visits Ralph in his tent, claims that he is innocent of the murder that got him transported to Australia. He explains why he agreed to take on the office of hangman; having been convicted for stealing food, he was told “hang or be hanged”. He finally begs Ralph for a part in the play. A Jewish convict, John Wisehammer, engages Mary in a conversation about the meanings and sounds of words; she suggests he also take part in the play.

At the first rehearsal, two actors, Kable and Arscott, are missing; Sideway overacts, and Liz can't act at all. A convict named Black Caesar arrives and asks to play a servant. The rehearsal is interrupted by Ross and Campbell, who inform Ralph that Cable and Arscott have escaped. Ross arrests Caesar, who initially went with the escapees but came back. He also arrests Wisehammer, because Cable was last seen near Wisehammer's hut; and Liz, accused of helping Cable steal food from the stores. The rehearsal is left in shambles.

In prison, Liz tells Wisehammer her life story. Wisehammer protests that he is innocent. Caesar dreams of making another escape attempt and returning to Madagascar. John Arscott, who has been recaptured, desperately cries out that escape is impossible. Sideway, Duckling and Mary arrive in prison so they can continue to rehearse.

Ralph tells Philip that, because half of his actors are in prison, he wants to stop the play, but Philip exhorts him to continue trying, making Ralph see the much larger meaning that the play has for the colony. Philip especially advocates for Liz Morden, as he wants to make an example of her – through redemption.

In his tent, Harry Brewer sees the ghosts of the two men he hanged, including his rival Handy Baker. He shouts for Duckling, but when she arrives, he cannot trust her, saying that the "ghost" told him that Handy and Duckling had been on the beach together.

On Philip's orders, Ross brings Wisehammer, Caesar, and Liz to the second rehearsal. Nobody feels comfortable rehearsing in Ross's presence and Ralph tries to get him to leave. This just infuriates Ross. He starts humiliating the convicts, forcing Sideway to show his flogging scars, Dabby to imitate a dog and Mary to show the tattoo high up on her inner thigh. As the rehearsal continues, Sideway and Liz begin to enter more fully into their parts, boldly using the full length of the room and interacting with the others. The words of the play take a double meaning highly significant to the situation. In response, Ross orders Campbell to flog Arscott as punishment for his escape; the sounds of the flogging and Arscott's cries end the rehearsal.

Liz has been sentenced to death for stealing food. Freeman reluctantly measures her for hanging. Harry, who oversees the process, still hears the ghosts of the dead. It becomes clear that Liz did not defend herself at her trial, but just as 'Ketch' and Harry are about to leave, she asks Harry to tell Ralph that she did not steal the food. As they question her as to why she didn't speak up, Harry collapses.

As Kable is not back, Ralph has taken over his part in The Recruiting Officer. It is clear by now that Wisehammer and Ralph are rivals for Mary's affection, just as they are for Silvia's in the Farquhar play. Dabby complains that she can't relate to her character, but Wisehammer argues that a play should teach you something new. Arscott remarks that the play allows him to forget about own situation, contrasting with Dabby, who wants to play herself. The arrival of Ketch Freeman ends the rehearsal, as the others refuse to act with a hangman.

In Harry Brewer's tent, Duckling promises love and fidelity to Harry, only to discover that he has just died. She collapses.

Mary is rehearsing on her own. Ralph joins her. Reciting their lines in the play, they end up confessing their love.

Philip, Ross, Collins, Campbell and Ralph discuss Liz Morden one more time. Collins is afraid of a miscarriage of justice, as the evidence against her is flimsy. Liz is given a last chance to defend herself. She finally speaks, saying that she knew Cable wanted to steal the food, but she wasn't present when he did. Collins orders a retrial. Despite her situation, Liz surprises everyone present by politely promising to perform her role in the play.

Backstage before the performance, the actors attempt to console Duckling. They also discuss the future: Dabby plans to escape that night; Sideway wants to start a theatre company; Liz and Freeman want to join Sideway's company as actors and Wisehammer as playwright; Mary and Ralph plan their lives together. Caesar is very drunk and suffering from stage fright; only ludicrous threats from his fellow actors convince him to go on stage. Wisehammer reminds Ralph of the prologue he wrote for the play and reads it. Although pleased, Ralph does not dare to use it, because it is too political. The play begins: Arscott and Caesar go onstage while as the rest of the cast listens in trepidation. The first speech of the play is met with tremendous applause.

== Characters ==
=== Use of doubling ===
The play has been written with the idea of doubling in mind, needing only 10 actors for 22 roles. It is typically performed with performers changing costumes on stage; a wig and military uniform jacket marking the only differences between an officer and a convict. Ralph Clark is the only character that has to be played by an actor without a second role; every other actor plays at least one convict and one officer, with three actors even taking three roles. The following table shows the list of characters with all roles typically (as done by the original production and imitated by most later productions) taken by one actor in the same horizontal line.

=== Overview of characters ===
- Captain Arthur Phillip, RN: The real Arthur Phillip had been called out of retirement to take on the position of Governor of the first fleet to Australia. He is a calm and controlled leader, contrasting Major Robbie Ross's leadership. He shows an obvious patience and understanding towards the convicts, especially Liz Morden. Throughout the play he refers to historical people and situations, such as famous thespians Garrick and Kemble. He is intellectual, understanding, and authoritative.
- Major Robbie Ross, RM: The real Major Robbie Ross had previously been on the losing side of the American War of Independence. In the play, Ross makes a reference to this, "This is a profligate prison for us all, it's a hellish hole we soldiers have been hauled to because they blame us for losing the war in America." (Act Two, Scene Ten) The fact he feels he is being blamed may account for some of his bitterness. He is a vile, power obsessed man, who intimidates the convicts and believes that the convicts' punishment should be severe. He is completely against the play The Recruiting Officer being put on, and constantly ridicules Ralph Clark for it.
- Captain David Collins, RM: Collins was appointed as the colony's judge on arrival at Botany Bay in 1788 and as such, his contribution to conversations at hand are generally from a legal perspective. He approaches subjects with the other officers very logically and justifies all of his comments. He fully supports Ralph's decision to stage a play and conducts a vote amongst the officers to find out who agrees with them. The real David Collins went on to found the first settlement in Tasmania.
- Captain Watkin Tench, RM: Tench is an officer who dislikes all of the convicts for the simple fact that they are convicts. Whenever he has a comment to make about them, it is always a sarcastic aside. He does not believe in the redemption of the convicts, nor in the fact that they can be converted from their criminal ways. He regards all of the convicts as barbarians, stating that hanging is "their favourite form of entertainment" (Act One, Scene Three).
- Captain Jemmy Campbell, RM: A follower of Ross. There is great debate among productions as to his sobriety and while he is often played as drunk, there is nothing ever mentioned in the script to confirm this thought. He tends to copy Ross's views on everything though finds himself amused by the idea of the convicts performing a play.
- Reverend Richard Johnson: The first clergyman in the Australian Penal Colony at Port Jackson, Johnson was to be a moral guide to both the convicts and officers of the camp, but seems more concerned with the play propagating Christian doctrine than any more pressing matters at hand. The Real Reverend Johnson was given a patch of land on which he planted oranges and lemons from Rio de Janeiro. It is said that he sold his 'Farm' for a fair profit when he left the colony.
- Lieutenant William Dawes, RM: The colony's astronomer, who couldn't care less about matters on earth. He agrees to the play if he doesn't have to come and watch it.
- Lieutenant George Johnston, RM: An officer most famed for his "compassion, if not to say passion" (Act One, Scene Six) for the convict women. The real Johnston lived with a convict named Esther Abrahams and later took part in the Rum Rebellion.
- Second Lieutenant Ralph Clark: Ralph is struggling as a lower officer. He desperately wants promotion, and when he hears through Harry Brewer that Arthur Phillip has suggested a play be put on by the convicts, he jumps to set about doing it. You see his transformation in the play as he turns from a man who is extremely nervous and uneasy around women, even ridiculed for not having a woman convict for himself on the voyage to Australia, to a man in love with the convict Mary Brenham. He is influenced, to changing his feelings towards the convicts, by Arthur Phillip, giving them respect in the end, apologising to Liz Morden for interrupting her line in a rehearsal. The real Ralph Clark later had a daughter with Mary Brenham, whom he named Betsey Alicia – for his wife in England.
- Second Lieutenant William Faddy: He opposes the play simply because he doesn't like Ralph. His dislike is never really explained, but all of his comments in his only scene (Act One, Scene Six) are sarcastic snides or even insults directed at Ralph.
- Midshipman Harry Brewer: Harry Brewer is an officer alongside the other army men, but is the lowest of ranks, Midshipman Harry Brewer struggles to find his place. Tormented by the apparent ghost of Handy Baker, a man who he had hanged, and other ghosts, he seeks reassurance in Ralph. Since in Australia, he and convict Duckling Smith have been together. He is a very jealous man, and is always keeping a watchful eye on Duckling, much to her dismay. He dies, with Duckling at his side in despair.
- John Arscott: John Arscott's hopelessness as a convict becomes apparent in Act Two, Scene One. He says, 'There's no escape I tell you.' His utter hopelessness becomes more apparent when it is revealed that his compass he bought from a sailor is actually a piece of paper with 'North' written on it. Depending upon the delivery, this line can be full of humour or full of pathos. He eventually becomes most lost in the play, claiming that he doesn't have to think about reality when he plays Kite, finding a different way of "escape" through the theatre. The real John Arscott never actually tried escaping and got rich enough after his liberation to return to England.
- James "Ketch" Freeman: Transported to Australia for the killing of a sailor who broke a strike, Freeman is made the hangman of the colony when he is told 'hang or be hanged'. Despised by many of the other convicts for being a hangman, in particular Liz Morden, Ketch struggles to be accepted. He exchanges words with Ralph in Act One, Scene Nine. He explains how he came to be in his situation, blaming a mix of reasons including leaving Ireland where his guardian angel was. You see also in this scene his desperation to be an actor in the play.
- John Wisehammer: Transported to Australia for stealing snuff, he continues to claim his innocence. He is Jewish and struggles against slight (Liz) and strong (Ross) anti-semitism. His large knowledge is self-taught and he says of himself that he "like[s] words" (Act One, Scene Ten). He writes a new prologue to the play, which Ralph doesn't want to use on the first night, as he considers it too political. In the end, Wisehammer wants to stay in Australia, as "no one has more of a right than anyone else to call [him] a foreigner" (Act Two, Scene Eleven), and to become an author there. He and Mary Brenham exchange words, literally, in Act One, Scene Ten, where Wisehammer's slight intellectualism is explained. The real Wisehammer would get married and become a merchant after his release.
- Black Caesar: Originally from Madagascar, Caesar wants to join the play and gets the (silent) parts of Worthy's servant and Kite's drummer more or less written for him. Stage fright gets the better of him in the end and he is only made to perform after the most ludicrous threats from his fellow actors. The real John Caesar was described as one of the most troublesome convicts and would be one of the colony's first bushrangers before being killed in 1796.
- Robert Sideway: A London pickpocket, severely punished on the transport ship for insulting an officer, Sideway tries to act as a cultured gentleman in front of Ralph, but keeps falling into cant when upset. He claims to have seen many theatre pieces, but his acting is completely over the top and one of the major sources of humour in the first rehearsal scene, when he accompanies near every word with a gesture. He says that he wants to found a theatre company in the last scene, which, according to the epilogue in Thomas Keneally's novel, the historical Sideway actually did.
- Mary Brenham (Branham): A very shy girl, whose love for "A.H." turned her into a thief, she gets as good as dragged to the audition by Dabby Bryant, but is offered a part by Ralph after having heard her read only a few lines. She opens up gradually, but remains slightly naive in comparison to the people around her. She finally falls in love with Ralph and dreams of a future with him. Brenham and Clark would indeed have a daughter, but Clark would leave both of them behind upon returning to England.
- Dabby Bryant: Mary's friend who constantly dreams of returning to Devon. Although she did sell Mary for food on the ship, she obviously cares for her. Although she seems to enjoy the play, she thinks the content and especially her character, Rose, are stupid and argues for a play that is more relevant towards their current situation. In the final scene, she reveals that she has plans for escaping that night. The real Mary Bryant would indeed become famous for a daring escape in 1791.
- Duckling Smith: A young thief and prostitute, sentenced to death at only 18 years of age. Harry Brewer is hopelessly in love with her, a feeling that for a long time does not appear to be mutual. She only admits to loving Harry once he is close to dying and later says that she never told him about her love as she feared he might become cruel towards her. Keneally lists her real name as Ann, but none of the three women named "Ann Smith" on the First Fleet fit her description.
- Liz Morden: One of the most troublesome women, Governor Phillip wants to make an example out of her: through redemption, which is why he wants her in the play. Liz is accused of stealing food, but does not defend herself at her trial. The play makes her care enough about herself to defend herself when given the last chance in Act Two, Scene Ten, where she claims that before, speaking wouldn't have mattered. In Keneally's novel, her name is Nancy Turner. Neither name can be found on the list of First Fleet convicts.
- Meg Long: Nicknamed "Shitty Meg", she acts as a madam for the other women convicts. She has a short but humorous appearance in the audition, where she completely misunderstands Clark's call for women.
- An Aboriginal Australian: He describes the British settler's efforts with curiosity and later with fear. Depending on how prominent his appearances are made in a given staging, the subject of colonisation may become more and more central to the play.

== Educational use ==
In England, the play is used by the exam board AQA and Edexcel as a set text for Advanced Level Theatre Studies and as a set text to use in comparison essays for GCE. It has also been used in universities' performing arts and English departments. It has been performed across Europe as part of GCE candidates' final performances. It is also used at AS level in English Literature studies, as well as a set text in the OIB administered by CIE and is also commonly used in English speaking English Literature classes for the International Baccalaureate Diploma Programme.

== Productions ==
The play's first production was at the Royal Court Theatre, London, on 10 September 1988, directed by Max Stafford-Clark. The production starred David Haig as Ralph Clark, Jim Broadbent as Harry Brewer, John Arscott and Captain Campbell, Linda Bassett as Lieutenant Will Dawes and Liz Morden, and Ron Cook as Captain Arthur Phillip and John Wisehammer.

"Our Country's Good" made its American premier at the Mark Taper Forum in Los Angeles in 1989, directed by Max Stafford-Clark of England’s Royal Court Theatre, and Les Waters the associate artistic director. The production featured Mark Moses (2nd Lieutenant Ralph Clark) Caitlin Clark (Liz Morden and Reverend Johnson) Tony Amendola, Valerie Mahaffey.

Our Country's Good premiered on Broadway at the Nederlander Theatre on April 29, 1991, and closed on June 8, 1991, after 12 previews and 48 performances. Directed by Mark Lamos, the cast featured Cherry Jones (Liz Morden and Reverend Johnson), Peter Frechette (2nd Lieutenant Ralph Clark), Tracey Ellis (Mary Brennan and Lieutenant George Johnston), Amelia Campbell (Lieutenant Will Dawes, Duckling Smith and Meg Long) and J. Smith-Cameron (Dabby Bryant and 2nd Lieutenant William Faddy).

The play was performed at the Edinburgh's Royal Lyceum Theatre, directed by Caroline Hall and featuring Louise Gold as Lieutenant Will Dawes and Liz Morden. It was also presented at the Liverpool Playhouse in 2007. Among the cast members was Charlie Brooks. The actors also provided a workshop for real life convicts in Walton Prison.

== Awards and nominations ==
1988 Laurence Olivier Award

- BBC Award for the Play of the Year {Winner}
- Director of the Year (nominee)
- Actor of the Year in a New Play (David Haig (Winner))

1991 Tony Award

- Best Play (nominee)
- Best Actor in Play (Peter Frechette) (nominee)
- Best Actress in a Play (Cherry Jones) (nominee)
- Best Featured Actress in a Play
  Amelia Campbell (nominee)
  J. Smith-Cameron (nominee)
- Best Direction of a Play (nominee)

1991 New York Drama Critics' Circle Award

- Best Foreign Play

Drama Desk Award

- Outstanding Featured Actress in a Play (Tracey Ellis) (nominee)

2012 Manchester Theatre Award

- Best Visiting Production (Original Theatre Company) (nominee)
