= NSW Marines =

NSW Marines may refer to

- the New South Wales Marine Corps which accompanied the First Fleet to Australia and was disbanded in 1791; or
- the New South Wales Marine Light Infantry which took part in the Boxer Rebellion in 1900–01.
