= Watkin Tench =

Royal Marines officer (1758–1833)

Lieutenant-General Watkin Tench
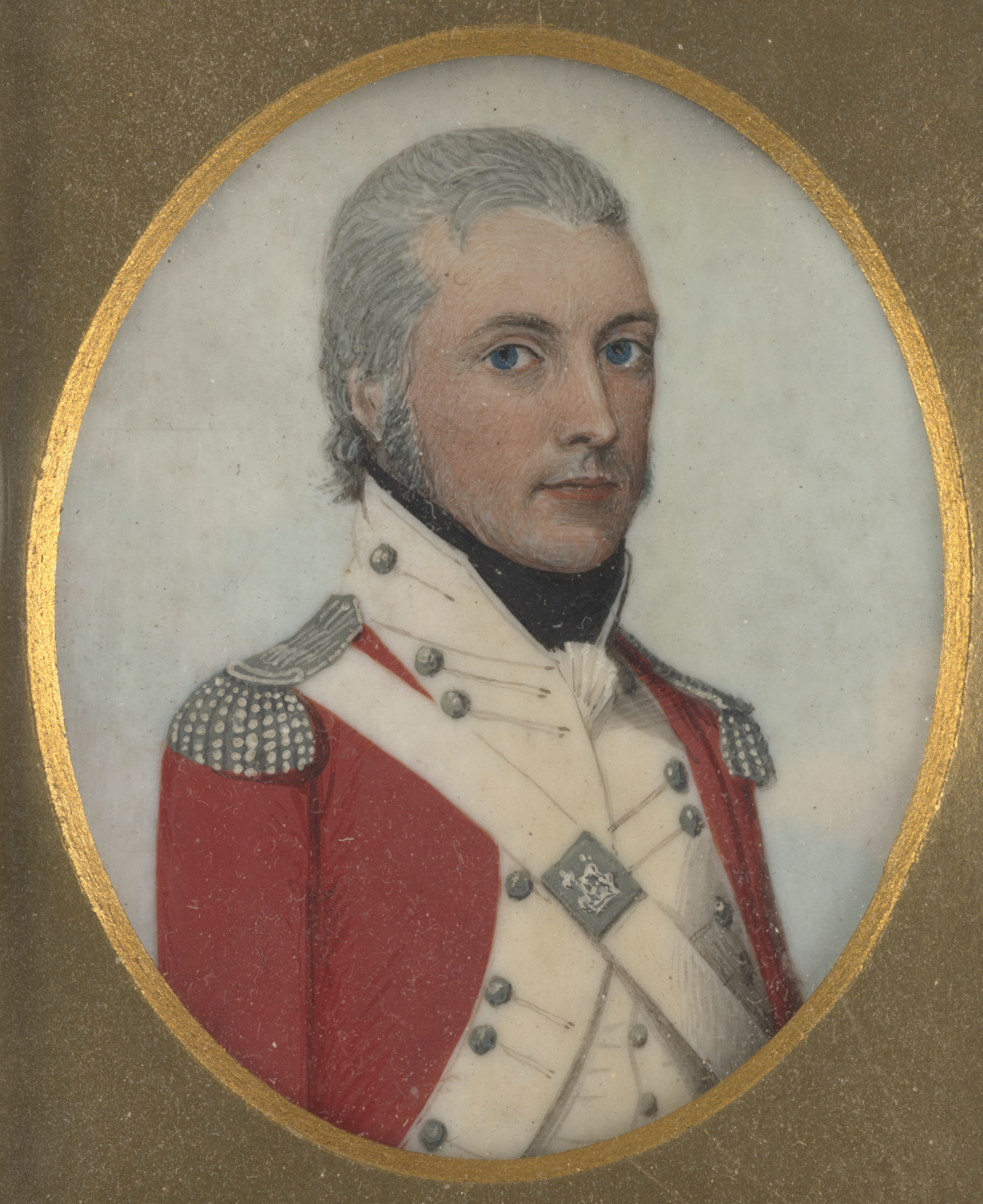
- Portrait attributed to Frederick Buck, 1795
- Born: 6 October 1758; Chester, Cheshire
- Died: 7 May 1833 (aged 74); Devonport, England
- Military career
- Allegiance: Great Britain; United Kingdom
- Branch: Royal Marines
- Service years: 1776–1827
- Rank: Lieutenant-general
- Conflicts: American War of Independence; French Revolutionary Wars; Napoleonic Wars
- Other work: Writer

Lieutenant-General Watkin Tench (6 October 1758 – 7 May 1833) was a British military officer who is best known for publishing two books describing his experiences in the First Fleet, which established the first European settlement in Australia in 1788. His two accounts, Narrative of the Expedition to Botany Bay and Complete Account of the Settlement at Port Jackson provide an account of the arrival and first four years of the colony.

== Early life and career ==
Tench was born on 6 October 1758 at Chester in the county of Cheshire, England, a son of Fisher Tench, a dancing master who ran a boarding school in the town and Margaritta Tarleton of the Liverpool Tarletons. Watkin was a cousin to the soldier and politician Banastre Tarleton. His father appears to have named Watkin after a wealthy local landowner, Watkin Williams Wynn, whose family probably assisted in starting Tench's military career.

Tench joined His Majesty's Marine Forces, Plymouth division, as a second lieutenant on 25 January 1776, aged 17. He was promoted to first lieutenant on 25 January 1778 at the age of 19 years and 3 months. He fought against the American forces in their War of Independence. He was captured when HMS Mermaid was driven ashore on the Maryland coast at Assateague Island near the then extant Sinepuxent Inlet on the morning of 8 July 1778, by the French under Comte d'Estaing. Tench was in command of the Marine unit on board HMS Mermaid. He and the other officers were transported to Philadelphia, imprisoned and exchanged in October 1778.

== Colonial career ==
Little more is known of him until he sailed as part of the First Fleet in 1787, although he records in Chapter 13 of the Account that he had spent time in the West Indies, and his service record shows that he was promoted to captain lieutenant in September 1782 and went on half-pay in May 1786.

=== Aboard the First Fleet ===
The retirement did not last long, as in October 1786 the Admiralty called for volunteers for a three-year tour with the newly forming New South Wales Marine Corps for service at Botany Bay. In December 1786, Tench's offer to re-enter the corps was accepted. In May 1787, he sailed on the transport ship Charlotte.

=== In the colony of New South Wales ===
Before sailing with the fleet, Tench arranged with the London publishing firm of Debrett's to write a book, describing his experience of the journey and the first few months of the colony. In July 1788, his manuscript was taken back by John Shortland and published as the Narrative of the Expedition to Botany Bay by Debrett's in 1789. It ran to three editions and was quickly translated into French, German, Dutch and Swedish. The Dutch translation was published in Amsterdam, by Martinus De Bruijn. Unlike the French and German translations, De Bruijn’s edition contained an extensive commentary on the colony from a Dutch perspective.

In October 1788, Robert Ross made a list of marines who wanted to stay in Australia, either as soldiers or settlers. Tench headed the list as "a soldier for one tour more of three years." Among his achievements in the fledgling colony of New South Wales Tench was being the first European to encounter the Nepean River. Tench's accounts were influenced by the liberalism of Jean-Jacques Rousseau and the idea of the noble savage. He ridicules Rousseau's notion of the noble savage and details the colonists' treatment of Aboriginal people.

His writings include much information about the Aborigines of Sydney, the Gadigal and Cammeraygal, whom he referred to as "Indians". He was friendly with Bennelong, Barangaroo and several others. He stayed in Sydney until December 1791 when he sailed home on HMS Gorgon, arriving in Plymouth in July 1792. In 1791 he studied the progress of the colony as research for his second book, visiting, among others, the farm of the convict Thomas William Parr, whom he found to have made improvements as required by the terms of the grant, and was a hard worker, but not satisfied with farming work.

== Later life ==
=== Back in England ===
In October 1792, Tench married Anna Maria Sargent, who was the daughter of Robert Sargent, a Devonport surgeon. In 1793, he published his Account of the Settlement at Port Jackson, which was as well-received as his first book. He joined HMS Alexander as a brevet major, serving under Admiral Richard Rodney Bligh in the Channel fleet's blockade of Brest.

=== Napoleonic Wars ===
In November 1794, Bligh surrendered HMS Alexander after the action of 6 November 1794, a hard-fought battle with three French ships. The crew were initially imprisoned on ships in Brest harbour. Later Tench and Bligh were moved to Quimper and imprisoned on parole. Bligh kept Tench close by because Tench was fluent in French. During this time, Tench wrote, but probably did not send, the letters that formed the basis of his third book, Letters written in France to a Friend in London. He was exchanged in May 1795 after being held prisoner for six months.

After returning to service, Tench served four years on HMS Polyphemus, escorting convoy ships in the Atlantic and the Channel. In 1801, he rejoined the Channel blockade fleet on HMS Princess Royal and remained there until his career at sea ended in 1802. After this, he appears to have taken shore posts at Chatham, Plymouth and Woolwich until he retired with the rank of major general at the end of 1815.

=== Later years and death ===
In October 1819, Tench was reactivated as commandant in the Plymouth division at the age of 61. Although he and his wife had no children of their own, in 1821 they took responsibility for three nephews and a niece when the four children were orphaned. At the time, Watkin Tench was 63 and his wife was 56. Watkin Tench resided in Chapel Street, Penzance, in the house constructed by Richard Oxnam's grandfather. He lived there from 1818 until 1828.

In July 1827, Tench retired with the rank of lieutenant general. He died on 7 May 1833, in Devonport, near Plymouth, Devon, England, aged 74.

== In popular culture ==
- The Watch on the Headland (1940) - radio play
- Eleanor Dark, The Timeless Land (1941 novel)
- Kate Grenville, The Lieutenant (novel) as Captain Silk
- Timberlake Wertenbaker, Our Country's Good (1988 play). Tench is portrayed as an unsympathetic character who does not believe in any hope of redemption or rehabilitation for any of the transported English convicts of the First Fleet.

Tench Reserve in Penrith, New South Wales, is named after him, as is Watkin Tench Parade in Pemulwuy, New South Wales.

== See also ==
- Journals of the First Fleet
