= Ralph Clark =

British military officer (1755–1794)

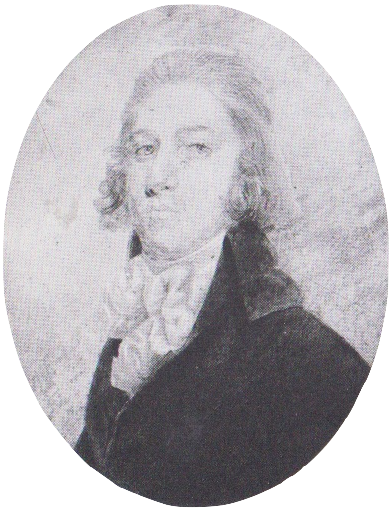

Personal details
- Born: 30 March 1755/1762 Edinburgh, Scotland
- Died: June 1794 West Indies

Military service
- Allegiance: Great Britain
- Branch/service: His Majesty's Marine Forces
- Years of service: 1779–1794
- Rank: First lieutenant

First Lieutenant Ralph Clark (30 March 1755/1762 – June 1794) was a British military officer best known for his diary spanning the early years of British settlement in Australia, including the voyage of the First Fleet. Born in Edinburgh, Scotland, Clark saw service in the American War of Independence before volunteering for the voyage to Australia. Arriving in New South Wales in January 1788, he filled a number of roles in the newly established colony, including serving on picket duty, guarding convicts, and on the Criminal Court.

Having been temporarily promoted to the rank of first lieutenant, Clark was sent to Norfolk Island aboard HMS Sirius in March 1790, which was subsequently wrecked off the island's coast. After a period on the island, he returned to England aboard HMS Gorgon, arriving in June 1792, and was then posted to the West Indies to fight in the French Revolutionary Wars, dying in a battle off the coast of Hispaniola in June 1794. Clark's diaries, although never intended to be published, provide some of the most personal information about the early convict era in Australia, and are currently held by the State Library of New South Wales.

== Biography ==
Clark was born in Edinburgh, Scotland, to Ann (née Man) and George Clark. (Note: Clark's exact date of birth is unclear. It is known from his diaries that he celebrated his birthday on 30 March, but different sources suggest that he was either born in 1755 or 1762.) He enlisted as a second lieutenant in the 27th Company of the Royal Marines on 25 August 1779, having previously been in the "Dutch service". (Note: Clark's period in the "Dutch service" is only known from a single diary entry, that of 9 July 1787, which noted that he "Saw John Johnson my old companion in the Dutch Service". It is unclear whether "Dutch service" refers to time spent in the Navy of the Dutch Republic, or time spent fighting the Dutch in the Fourth Anglo-Dutch War, both of which fit the diary's chronology.) Clark saw service in the American War of Independence, and at the end of his service returned to live in London, although he was assigned to the Portsmouth division of the marines. Having transferred to the 6th Company in 1783, he married Betsy Alicia Trevan, of Efford, Devon, on 23 June 1784, with a son, Ralph Stuart Clark, born on 23 August 1785. (Note: The name of Clark's son is sometimes transcribed as "Ralph Stewart Clark".) In order to further his chances for promotion (and thus a higher salary), Clark volunteered to serve in the New South Wales Marine Corps, which accompanied the First Fleet, which was transporting convicts to a penal colony that was to be established in New South Wales. He was posted to the Friendship, which held mainly female convicts.

Arriving with the fleet in January 1788, Clark filled a number of roles in the colony, from guarding convicts to occasionally serving on the Criminal Court, which he heavily disliked. When not on duty, he went fishing and shooting, collecting a number of specimens which he sent back to England. To supplement their meagre rations, officers were allowed to keep vegetable gardens, which were tended by convicts. Clark established one such garden on a small island in Port Jackson, which would subsequently be known as Clark Island. (Note: The garden which Clark established was quite unsuccessful, with most of the produce being quickly stolen. In February 1790, the exasperated Clark noted in his journal that "some Boat had landed since I had been there last and taken away the greatest part … it is impossible for any body to attempt to raise any Garden stuff here, before it comes to perfection they will steal it.") To provide some entertainment for the colony, Clark was asked by the governor, Arthur Phillip, to stage a play using convict actors, with The Recruiting Officer chosen as the play to be performed. He and the convicts' experiences were later the subject of a novel, The Playmaker, by Thomas Keneally, and a play, Our Country's Good, by Timberlake Wertenbaker. Clark was also quite friendly with local Aboriginal tribes (specifically the Eora), particularly compared to some of his companions. At one point, in February 1790, he was asked by the governor to "capture" two Aboriginal tribesmen who he had traded with earlier, but refused for fear their children would starve.

Following the death of Captain John Shea in February 1789, Clark was promoted to fill his role, and temporarily given the rank of first lieutenant by Major Robert Ross. The following year, he was chosen to sail to Norfolk Island with Ross, departing Sydney aboard HMS Sirius on 6 March 1790. Owing to the lack of a natural harbour on the island, Sirius was forced to anchor off the coast, and land men and stores via smaller boats. The ship was wrecked on an offshore reef shortly afterward, although there were no deaths. On Norfolk Island, Clark was made quartermaster general and keeper of the stores at Sydney Bay, and was later put in charge of the settlement at Charlotte Field. In April 1791, he was responsible for laying out the settlement at Queensborough. During his time on the island, Clark impregnated a female convict, Mary Branham, with a daughter, Alicia (named after Clark's wife), born in July 1791. After a further period on the island, Clark was sent back to Sydney, arriving in December 1791 accompanied by Branham, and then back to England on HMS Gorgon, arriving in June 1792. Upon his return, he was posted to the 100th Company, based in Chatham, Kent. Although the appointment was made in October 1792, he did not join the company until January the following year, possibly due to illness or an extended period of leave. Clark left for the West Indies in May 1793, aboard HMS Tartar, bringing his eight-year-old son with him to serve as a midshipman. Clark's wife died early in 1794, whilst giving birth to a stillborn child. Clark himself was killed in action some time in June 1794 off the coast of Hispaniola, while his son died of yellow fever towards the end of the same month. (Note: The exact dates of death of both Clark and his son are uncertain, although 18 and 30 June are considered likely. When Clark's papers were sold, it was advertised that he and his son had died on the same day, although it is likely that this was a fabrication to encourage sale.)

== Diary ==
Spanning a period from 9 March 1787 to 17 June 1792, although with occasional gaps, Clark's diaries are some of the most personal writings still in existence from the early history of the colonisation of Australia. His original journal is thought to have contained three notebooks, although the second of these, spanning the period from 11 March 1788 to 14 February 1790, is thought to have been lost. Clark also had a letterbook, in which many of his letters, both to his family and to other officers, were pasted. These letters were generally written in a more formal style. After his death, Clark's diaries and papers were preserved by his wife's family in Devon. They were auctioned by his great-nephew, Frederick Adolphus Trevan, at Sotheby's in London in May 1914, along with some of the letters of Captain Cook. Purchased by the State Library of New South Wales as three separate volumes, the journal was disbound during the 1920s and compiled into a single volume. However, in 2002, funded by the Nelson Meers Foundation, the pages were removed from their mounts and rebound into four volumes with soft vellum covers. The diary was also digitised. The journal is written in ink on thin, unruled diary paper, and is 312 pages in length.

Leaving his wife and son, Clark began the first of his diaries a month before the First Fleet departed Portsmouth, on 13 May 1787. The writing in the diaries is very personal and informal, and was never intended for publication. Clark was extremely homesick, and longed to see his wife and son, writing as early as the second day of the voyage: "Oh my God all my hoppes [sic] are over of seeing my beloved wife and son". Like many of his fellow officers, he was aggrieved at the level of comfort and support offered to the convicts, noting "I believe few Marines or Soldiers going out on a foreign Service under Government were ever better, if so well provided for as these Convicts are". On arrival in Botany Bay, Clark was dismayed at the unsuitable conditions, which were far from what had been promised in England: "if we are obliged to settle here there will not a soul be alive in the course of a year". With the site for settlement subsequently moved to Sydney Cove, Clark remained distressed by the living conditions experienced by himself and his fellow officers, expressing in a letter to his family in England: "I never slept worse, my dear wife, than I did last night, what with the hard cold ground, spiders, ants and every vermin you can think of was crawling over me". During the colony's early years, little food was produced, and the rations brought from England were soon consumed, leaving the colony in near starvation. Clark wrote "God help us. If some ships dont [sic] arrive, I dont know what will". Supplies finally arrived in June 1790, on Lady Juliana.

Clark often expressed pleasure at the flogging of convicts, although rarely performed the punishment himself. After one incident, in which a particularly troublesome female convict, Elizabeth Dudgeon, was punished for insulting a guard officer, he noted "she has long been fishing for it, which she has at last got to her heart's content". He did, however, occasionally empathise with the convicts, especially when they were mistreated. Shortly after landing on Norfolk Island, Clark and Robert Kellow came across some convicts, including some women with their children, who had been forced to sleep in the open far from the main townsite, adequate accommodation being lacking: "on the Road we met a great many of the Convicts both Men and Women Particular the women that have young children Who told me that the[y] have been obliged to Sleep in the woods all night for the[y] could not get into Town, poor Devils how they are Kick[ed] about from one place to another". Unusually for the time, Clark was effectively a teetotaller, preferring to drink only lemonade. He often privately chastised his fellow officers' drinking habits, boasting in his diary that he had only been intoxicated once—at his wedding.

== See also ==
- Journals of the First Fleet

== Bibliography ==
- Hughes, Robert (1987). The Fatal Shore. New York City: Alfred A. Knopf. p. 97. ISBN 0-394-75366-6.
