= Friendship (ship) =

A number of ships have been named Friendship:

== Sailing ships ==
- Friendship – a ketch launched in 1705 for the Bengal Pilot service.
- Friendship – a brigantine owned by Roger Gregory of Virginia, wrecked off Portugal in 1770
- Friendship (1784 ship), a 278-ton (bm) brig built in Scarborough in 1784, that transported convicts to Botany Bay in 1788, as part of the First Fleet. She was scuttled in 1788.
- Friendship – a schooner built at Ipswich, Massachusetts, registered at Salem in 1789 to Asa Smith
- Friendship (1793 ship), was a three-decker merchantman launched in 1793. She made three voyages for the British East India Company (EIC). During her first voyage, in 1796, a French privateer captured her, but the Royal Navy recaptured her. On the second, in 1799, she transported convicts from Ireland to Australia. She made a second voyage transporting convicts in 1817–18. On her way back she was broken up in 1819 at Mauritius after having been found unseaworthy.
- Friendship, a brigantine of Salem, Massachusetts, of 164 tons, registered at Salem 1794 to Hodges & Nichols
- Friendship, a schooner of Beverly, Massachusetts, of 111 tons, registered at Salem in 1795 to Woodbury & Haskell
- Friendship (1797 ship) was launched in France or Spain, possibly in 1780. The British captured her in 1797 and she became a West Indiaman, and from 1798 a slave ship. Friendship made two complete voyages carrying slaves from West Africa to the West Indies. On her third voyage crew members mutinied, taking her before she had embarked any slaves. They sailed for the Caribbean but the Royal Navy retook her in 1801 and brought her into Barbados. There the Government Agent sold her. Tie incident resulted in a legal dispute between the owners and the insurers that in 1813 was decided in favour of the owners. New owners in 1803 continued to sail Friendship as West Indiaman. She was last listed in 1810.
- Friendship, an East Indiaman at Salem, Massachusetts, and launched in 1797; HMS Rosamond captured her in 1812 as she returned from Russia.
- Friendship (1824), a schooner of 120 tons (bm), built at Barnstaple for White & Co. (Van Dieman's Land Co.).
- Friendship, brigantine, Beverly, 157 tons registered at Salem in 1799 to Lovett, Leach & Kilham
- Friendship was launched at Yarmouth in 1800. The Royal Navy purchased her in 1804. She then served in the North Sea as HMS Centinel until she wrecked in October 1812.
- Friendship, schooner, Scarborough, Maine, 61 tons registered at Salem in 1801 to Hathorn & Pope
- FriendShip, sloop, Thomaston, Maine, 82 tons registered at Salem in 1808 to Porter & Marshall
- Friendship, schooner, place of construction unknown, 47 tons, registered at Salem in 1815 to Edward Richardson
- Friendship, ship, of Portland, Maine, 366 tons, registered at Salem in 1816 to Waite and Pierce. This was the Friendship that Malay pirates captured in 1813 at Quallah Battoo.

== Other ==
- SS Friendship (1897), an Australian cargo ship

== See also ==
- Friendship of Salem, a replica built in 2000 of the 1797 East Indiaman above
- HMS Friendship, the name of five vessels of the Royal Navy.
- Friendship (Disney Transport), a group of eight boats (suffixed with Roman numerals I through VIII depending on the boat) transporting Walt Disney World guests across Crescent Lake in the Epcot Resort Area and Epcot's World Showcase Lagoon.
