= New South Wales Marine Corps =

New South Wales Marines Corps
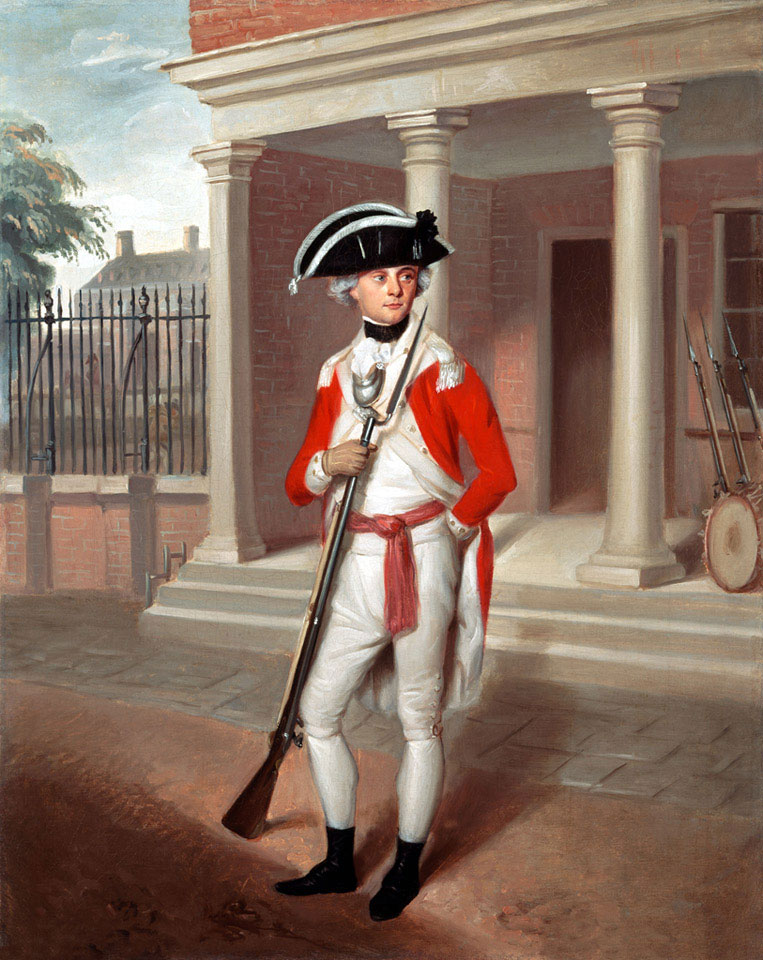
- c. 1780 portrait of a British marine lieutenant
- Active: 1786–1791
- Country: Great Britain
- Branch: His Majesty's Marine Forces
- Type: Marines
- Size: One battalion
- Colours: Wreath of thistles and roses on white background

Commanders
- Notable commanders: Major Robert Ross (1786–1791)

The New South Wales Marine Corps was a battalion-sized unit of the British Marine Forces created to guard convicts aboard the First Fleet to Australia, and to preserve "subordination and regularity" in the colony of New South Wales. Established in 1786, the unit served in New South Wales from 1788 to 1792, and was instrumental in establishing the colony's rule of law. Study of the complete New South Wales Marine complement indicates they were chosen from the Plymouth and Portsmouth Divisions, with only one exception. Beginning with guards arriving with the 2nd and 3rd fleets but officially with the arrival of HMS Gorgon on 22 September 1791, the New South Wales Marines were relieved by a newly formed British Army regiment of foot, the New South Wales Corps.

== Establishment ==
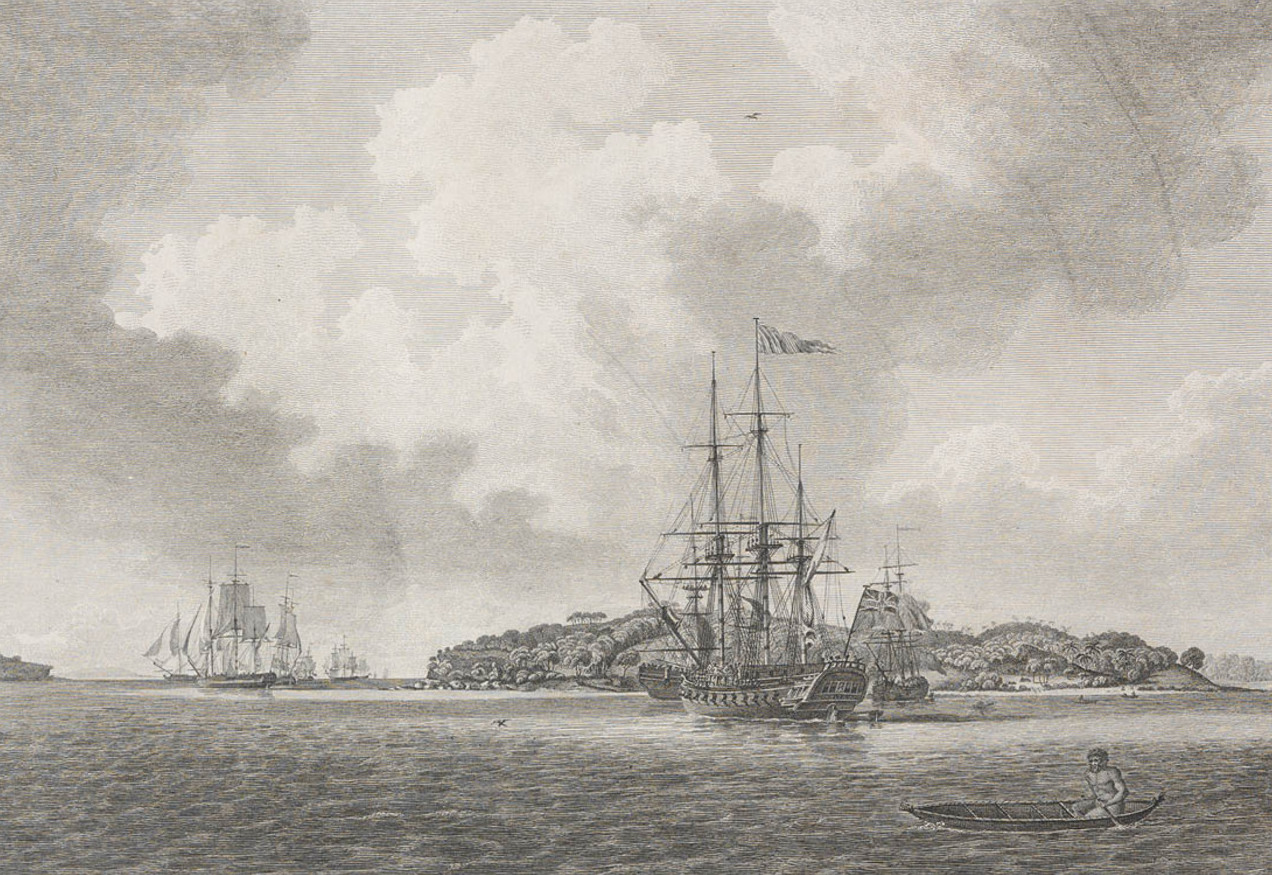
The First Fleet arriving at Botany Bay on 18 January 1788

The New South Wales Marine Corps was raised on 31 August 1786, with assent from King George III, for a force of 160 enlisted marines and accompanying officers to attend the British colony of New South Wales "for the purpose of enforcing subordination and obedience in the settlement [at Botany Bay], as well as for defence of that settlement against the incursions of the natives." Volunteers for the corps were required to have had a satisfactory prior record of service in the His Majesty's Marine Forces, to be at least 5 ft 6 in (1.68 m) tall, and under 40 years of age.

Recruits were offered a two-guinea incentive payment if they volunteered for the corps. A further inducement was that although enlistment as a British marine was traditionally for life, members of the New South Wales Marine Corps could seek an honourable discharge after three years of colonial service. With an eye to the likelihood of delays in setting out, the three-year term began on arrival of the First Fleet in New South Wales, rather than the dates of enlistment in England. Marines who chose this option had no automatic right of return to military service after discharge, but in practice, few were refused re-entry when their service expired.

Rates of pay were in accordance with those of the British marines, including the routine provision of a subsistence allowance, equivalent to two-thirds of daily pay. British marines received the allowance when in the field, i.e., not serving on board a vessel. The corps' troops received the allowance for the duration of their three-year enlistment, relieving the British Admiralty or the government of the colony of the responsibility of providing messing facilities. The corps' uniforms consisted of a red long-tailed doublet, white trousers, black headdress, and shoes and gaiters. Officers were authorised to carry swords and sidearms. Other ranks were issued Brown Bess muskets.

== Active service ==
In May 1787, four companies of marines, consisting of 160 Privates with 52 officers and NCO's under Major Robert Ross, accompanied the First Fleet to Botany Bay. In addition there were 34 officers and men serving in Ship's Complement of Marines aboard Sirius and Supply, bringing the total to 246. The Board of Ordnance provided one thousand carbines and ten thousand musket flints for Marine use in New South Wales, but due to an oversight in provisioning, the Fleet left Portsmouth without any substantial supply of ammunition. The error was kept a secret from the convicts in order to avoid an uprising, and was addressed via resupply when the fleet made port in Rio de Janeiro, midway through the voyage.

Security was strictly maintained during the voyage. Bulkheads filled with nails were constructed across each deck to separate the convict quarters from those of the Marines and ship's crew. Marines were routinely stationed at loopholes in these bulkheads in order to fire upon the convicts if necessary. Marines were stationed behind barricades constructed across the main deck and at each of the hatches leading below. A further Marine detachment was permanently stationed on the quarterdeck.

A marine caught in the convict women's tent was drummed out of the Corps on 9 February 1788. The music played for the occasion was "The Rogue's March", the first record of a named piece of music being played in Australia.

== Disbandment ==
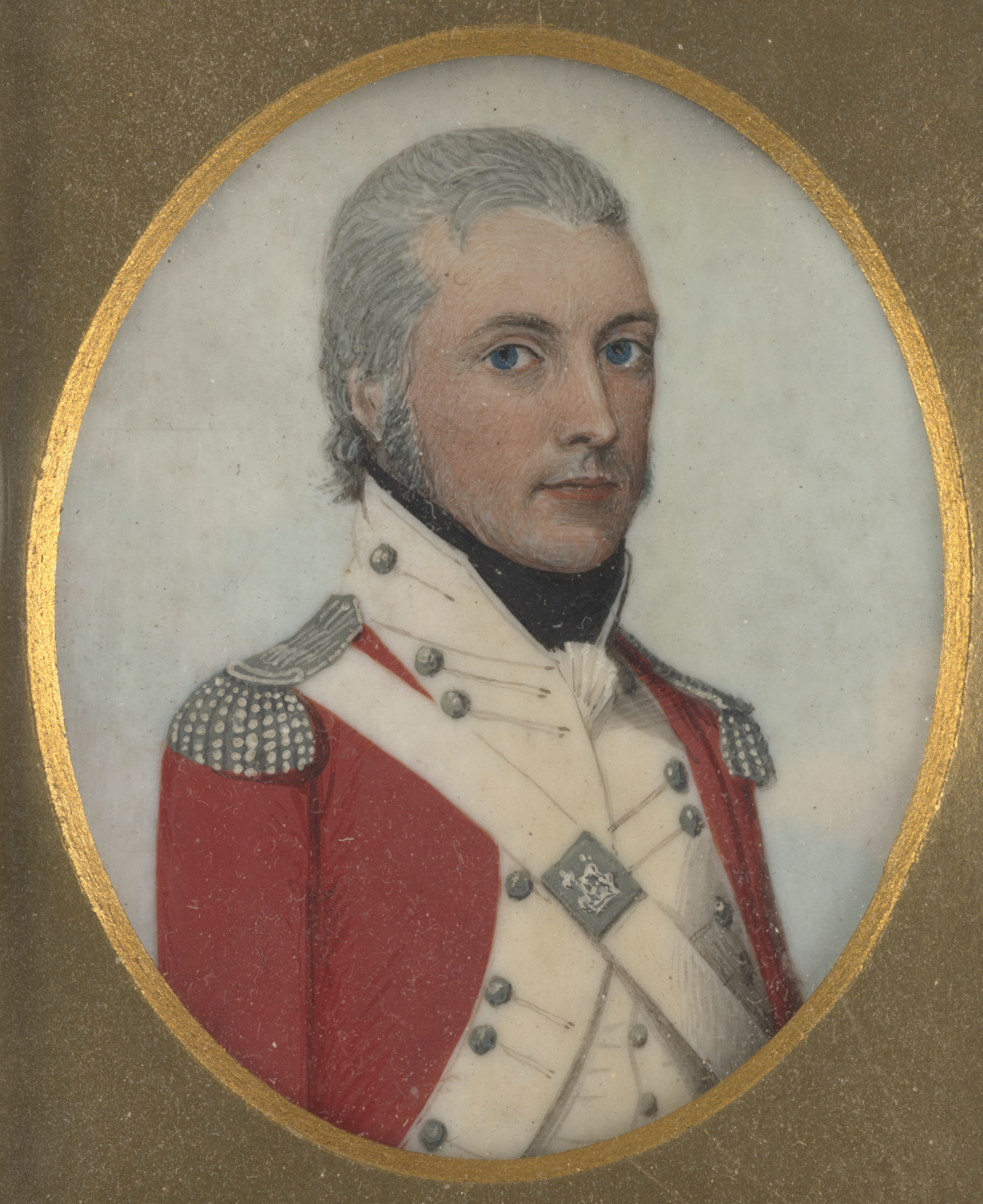
Watkin Tench, a captain-lieutenant in the corps

On 18 December 1791, HMS Gorgon left Port Jackson, taking home the larger part of the still serving New South Wales Marines. Those leaving included Major Robert Ross, Capt James Campbell, Capt James Meredith, Capt-Lieut Watkin Tench, 1st Lieut Ralph Clark, 2nd Lieut William Dawes and seven other Lieutenants accompanied by 15 non-commissioned officers (NCOs), six drummers and 48 privates with their families. Of the departure, Tench said, "we hailed it with rapture and exhilaration". There remained in New South Wales a company of active Marines serving under Captain George Johnston, with three officers, eight NCOs, two drummers and 50 privates. Remaining in the colony were some 90 discharged Marines, many of whom became settlers.

In December 1792, the last serving Marines officially departed from the colony when Governor Phillip departed aboard Atlantic Transport, accompanied by a retinue of the remaining three Marine lieutenants and some twenty NCOs and privates. Atlantic arrived at Portsmouth 23 May 1793, where a number of the NSW Marines aboard were allowed to be discharged at Marine headquarters in Portsmouth due to illness and being 'unserviceable'. The remainder were allowed to return to their divisions to continue their Marine service. This marked the official disbandment of the Corps.

== Precedent ==
The New South Wales Marines helped establish a precedent for the creation of ad hoc units for overseas service under the aegis of the Royal Marines. One example, from the Americas and the War of 1812, was the Corps of Colonial Marines, recruited from freed slaves.

== See also ==
- List of officers of the New South Wales Marine Corps
