= Robert Ross (Royal Marines officer) =

British Marines officer

Major Robert Ross (c. 1740 – 9 June 1794) was a Royal Marines officer from Scotland who was in charge of the Marines traveling with the First Fleet. He was also a lieutenant-governor of the convict settlement of Norfolk Island.

== Life and career ==
Robert Ross was born in Scotland, and joined the marines in June 1756, being present at the siege of Louisburg and the capture of Quebec during the Seven Years' War (1756–63). Promoted to captain, he saw action at Bunker Hill in June 1775 during the American War of Independence. He was aboard HMS Ardent in August 1779 when it was captured and he was taken prisoner by the French.

In 1786 he volunteered for the newly formed New South Wales Marine Corps and was designated its commander with the brevet rank of major. Accompanied by his eight-year-old son, he sailed to New South Wales on HMS Sirius, transferring to Scarborough during the voyage.

From the start of his time in New South Wales Ross was in conflict with the governor Arthur Phillip and other officers. David Collins claimed an "inexpressible hatred" for him, and Ralph Clark described him at the time as "without exception the most disagreeable commanding officer I ever knew". He refused to allow the marines to supervise the convicts at work, or to allow marine officers to sit as members of the criminal court, attitudes which some of his own officers disagreed with. He criticised Phillip for not building fortifications, and missed no opportunity to embarrass and hinder the governor. His actions made Phillip's task of administering the fledgling colony more difficult.

Probably to prevent open conflict, Phillip sent Ross to Norfolk Island in March 1790. Here, following the wreck of Sirius and the stranding of its crew on the island, Ross proclaimed martial law for four months. His attempts to clear more land so that the convicts could grow most of their own food increased their discontent at the additional heavy work. He quarrelled with his officers here as vigorously as he had at Port Jackson and was relieved, returning to Sydney in December 1791.

== Life in Sydney ==
Back in Sydney Ross immediately quarrelled and fought a duel with an officer of the newly arrived New South Wales Corps, neither party being injured. On 18 December he, and most of the marines, departed on HMS Gorgon.

Ross never adapted to life in the colony and had no faith in its future, stating that "in the whole world there is not a worse country than what we have yet seen of this. … it may with truth be said, here Nature is reversed." He also claimed that "every person … who came out with a desire for remaining … are now most earnestly wishing to get away from it."

On his return to England, Ross resumed his military career. His brevet rank of major was not confirmed, and he was relegated to captain-lieutenant and removed from active command. From 1792 to 1794 he served as Marines recruitment officer in the provincial centre of St Albans. He died on 9 June 1794.

Gillen says that he can be commended for his conscientious adherence to his principles, but appears to have been "narrow minded, censorious, self-important and almost totally humourless".

== Literary references ==
Ross appears as a significant character in the Timberlake Wertenbaker play, Our Country's Good. In a sense, he appears as the main villain of the piece, sporting an outraged attitude towards Ralph Clark's proposal to the play, and exhibiting near sadism in his treatment of the convicts.

Ross is also portrayed in Jimmy McGovern's TV series Banished, again in a negative manner. He is played by Joseph Millson.

== Bibliography ==
- Moore, John (1989). The First Fleet Marines. University of Queensland Press. ISBN 0702220655.

Government offices
Preceded by New title	Lieutenant Governor of New South Wales; 1786–1792	Succeeded by Francis Grose
