= 1878 in Australia =

- Decades: 1850s; 1860s; 1870s; 1880s; 1890s
- See also: Other events of 1878; Timeline of Australian history

The following lists events that happened during 1878 in Australia.

== Incumbents ==
- Monarch - Victoria

=== Governors ===
Governors of the Australian colonies:

- Governor of New South Wales – Sir Hercules Robinson
- Governor of Queensland – Sir Arthur Kennedy
- Governor of South Australia – Sir William Jervois
- Governor of Tasmania – Frederick Weld
- Governor of Victoria – Sir George Bowen
- Governor of Western Australia – Major General The Hon. Sir Harry Ord GCMG CB RE

=== Premiers ===
Premiers of the Australian colonies:

- Premier of New South Wales – James Farnell (until 20 December), then Sir Henry Parkes
- Premier of Queensland – John Douglas
- Premier of South Australia – James Boucaut (until 27 September), then William Morgan
- Premier of Tasmania – Philip Fysh (until 5 March), then William Giblin
- Premier of Victoria – Graham Berry

== Events ==
- 8–9 January – "Black Wednesday", 300 senior public servants are sacked in Victoria by the government of Graham Berry as revenge against the Legislative Council, on the grounds that as the appropriation bill had not been passed in the council, they could not be paid.
- 20 May – One thousand unemployed men march up Collins Street, Melbourne, demanding relief work. Premier Berry agrees to construct sanitation works and thus employ two hundred men.
- 1 June – The clipper ship Loch Ard is wrecked at Mutton Bird Island, just off the Shipwreck Coast of Victoria; 45 die, only two lives are saved.
- 9 December – Ned Kelly and his gang lock 22 people in a storehouse on a sheep station near Euroa. The next day they rob Euroa's bank.

== Exploration and settlement ==
- 18 January – construction of the Central Australia Railway starts in Port Augusta
- 3 September – the Main Southern railway line reached Wagga Wagga in an attempt to lure Riverina trade away from Victoria.
- European discovery of the Great Artesian Basin when a shallow bore near Bourke, New South Wales produced flowing water.
- Walcha, New South Wales proclaimed a town.
- The Brisbane suburb of Alderley, Queensland gained a post office.
- District of Kingaroy settled.
- The railway system reached Morgan, South Australia which was proclaimed a town in the same year.
- Quorn, South Australia surveyed and declared a town.
- Charter of Snowtown, South Australia proclaimed.

== Science and technology ==
- 8 January – The telephone is used for the first time in Australia in Melbourne.
- The Sydney Mechanics' Institute, founded in 1843, becomes the Sydney Technical College
- At Burnie, Tasmania, the Van Diemen's Land Company construct a 75 km wooden, horse-drawn, tramway to serve Mount Bischoff, at the time the richest tin mine in the world.

== Arts and literature ==
- 30 November – Advance Australia Fair first sung publicly at the Highland Society of NSW's annual Scottish concert in the Protestant Hall, Sydney.

== Sport ==
- 22 April – The Stawell Gift is run for the first time on Easter Monday in April.
- 5 November – Calamia wins the Melbourne Cup.

== Births ==
- 19 January – Don Cameron, politician (died 1962)
- 30 March – Harold Cazneaux, photographer (died 1953)
- 4 July – John McPhee, Premier of Tasmania (1928–1934) (died 1952)
- 1 October – Helen Mayo, medical doctor (died 1967)

== Deaths ==
- 11 March – Julie Vieusseux (born 1820), painter and educator
- 9 May – Thomas Sutcliffe Mort (born 1816), industrialist
- 14 August – Edward Henty (born 1810), pioneer settler
- 17 September – Randolph Isham Stow (born 1828), judge
- 22 October – Benjamin Babbage (born 1815), explorer
- 16 November – John Gardiner (born 1798), banker and pastoralist
