= 1880 in Australia =

- Decades: 1860s; 1870s; 1880s; 1890s; 1900s
- See also: Other events of 1880; Timeline of Australian history

The following lists events that happened during 1880 in Australia.

== Incumbents ==
=== Governors ===
Governors of the Australian colonies:

- Governor of New South Wales – Sir Augustus Loftus
- Governor of Queensland – Sir Arthur Kennedy
- Governor of South Australia – Sir William Jervois
- Governor of Tasmania – Frederick Weld until 5 April, vacant thereafter
- Governor of Victoria – George Phipps, 2nd Marquess of Normanby

=== Premiers ===
Premiers of the Australian colonies:

- Premier of New South Wales – Sir Henry Parkes
- Premier of Queensland – Thomas McIlwraith
- Premier of South Australia – William Morgan
- Premier of Tasmania – William Giblin
- Premier of Victoria –
  - until 5 March – Graham Berry
  - 5 March-3 August – James Service
  - starting 3 August – Graham Berry

== Events ==
- 22 January – Toowong State School is founded in Queensland.
- 20 January – Bushranger Captain Moonlite (real name Andrew George Scott) hanged in Sydney.
- 31 January – The Bulletin magazine is first published.
- May – School is made compulsory for children aged 6 to 14 in New South Wales.
- 28 June – Ned Kelly captured at Glenrowan, Victoria.
- 1 October – The Melbourne International Exhibition is opened at the Royal Exhibition Building in Carlton.
- 10 October – Geologist Lamont Young and four others disappear on a boat trip north from Bermagui, New South Wales.
- 11 November – Bushranger Ned Kelly is hanged.
- 23 November – Redmond Barry, the judge who sentenced Ned Kelly to be hanged, dies just twelve days after Kelly was hanged.

== Science and technology ==
- 2 February – The first successful shipment of frozen beef and mutton from Australia arrived in London aboard the SS Strathleven.
- August – The first telephone exchange in Australia opened in Melbourne.

== Sport ==
- Grand Flaneur wins the Melbourne Cup.
- England defeat Australia by 5 wickets in a Cricket Test held at The Oval.

== Births ==
- 2 January – Charlie Frazer, politician (died 1913)
- 15 April – Doug McLean, Sr., rugby footballer (died 1947)
- 8 August – Earle Page, the eleventh Prime Minister of Australia (died 1961)
- 10 December – Jessie Aspinall, doctor, first female junior medical resident at the Royal Prince Alfred Hospital (died 1953)
- 11 December – Frank Tarrant, cricketer (died 1951)

== Deaths ==
- 20 January – Captain Moonlight, bushranger (born 1842), hanged
- 2 May – Tom Wills, cricketer and founder of Australian rules football (born 1835), suicide
- 26 June – Aaron Sherritt, bushranger (born August 1854), shot by Joe Byrne
- 28 June – Joe Byrne, bushranger (born November 1856),
- 28 June – Steve Hart, bushranger (born February 1859),
- 28 June – Dan Kelly, bushranger and the younger brother of Ned Kelly (born June 1861),
- 29 July – Charles Hervey Bagot, South Australian pastoralist, mine owner and parliamentarian (b. 1788)
- 27 September – Charles Hardwicke, Tasmanian explorer (b. 1788)
- 27 October – Samuel Gill, artist (born 1818)
- 11 November – Ned Kelly, bushranger (b. c. 1855), hanged
- 23 November – Redmond Barry, Judge (born 1813)
