= 1886 in Australia =

- Decades: 1860s; 1870s; 1880s; 1890s; 1900s
- See also: Other events of 1886; Timeline of Australian history

The following lists events that happened during 1886 in Australia.

== Incumbents ==
- Monarch - Victoria

=== Premiers ===
- Premier of New South Wales – John Robertson (until 25 February) then Patrick Jenning
- Premier of Queensland – Samuel Griffith
- Premier of South Australia – John Downer
- Premier of Tasmania – Adye Douglas (til 8 March) then James Agnew
- Premier of Victoria – James Service (til 18 February) then Duncan Gillies

=== Governors ===
- Governor of New South Wales – Lord Carrington
- Governor of Queensland – Anthony Musgrave
- Governor of South Australia – William Robinson
- Governor of Tasmania – George Strahan
- Governor of Victoria – Henry Brougham Loch, 1st Baron Loch
- Governor of the Crown Colony of Western Australia – Sir Frederick Broome

== Events ==
- 25 January – The first assembly of the Federal Council of Australasia is held in Hobart.
- 30 May – The SS Ly-Ee-Moon sinks off Green Cape, New South Wales, with the loss of 71 persons.
- 12 June – William Spence chairs a meeting of shearers in Ballarat, Victoria at which the Australian Shearers Union is formed, an ancestor of the Australian Workers' Union.

=== Undated ===
- Queen Victoria grants the Cocos (Keeling) Islands to the Clunies Ross family.

== Sport ==
- November – Arsenal wins the Melbourne Cup
- England defeats Australia 3–0 in The Ashes

== Births ==
- 3 January – Arthur Mailey (died 1967), cricketer and journalist
- 4 May – Aubrey Abbott (died 1975), politician and administrator of the Northern Territory
- 28 November – Margaret McIntyre (died 1948), politician

== Deaths ==
- 4 November – James Martin (born 1820), Premier of New South Wales
