= 1879 in Australia =

- Decades: 1850s; 1860s; 1870s; 1880s; 1890s
- See also: Other events of 1879; Timeline of Australian history

The following lists events that happened during 1879 in Australia.

== Incumbents ==
=== Governors ===
Governors of the Australian colonies:

- Governor of New South Wales – Sir Hercules Robinson (until 19 March), then Sir Augustus Loftus
- Governor of Queensland – Sir Arthur Kennedy
- Governor of South Australia – Sir William Jervois
- Governor of Tasmania – Frederick Weld
- Governor of Victoria – Sir George Bowen (until 22 February), then George Phipps, 2nd Marquess of Normanby
- Governor of Western Australia – Major General The Hon. Sir Harry Ord GCMG CB RE

=== Premiers ===
Premiers of the Australian colonies:

- Premier of New South Wales – Sir Henry Parkes
- Premier of Queensland – John Douglas (until 21 January), then Thomas McIlwraith
- Premier of South Australia – William Morgan
- Premier of Tasmania – William Crowther (until 30 October), then William Giblin
- Premier of Victoria – Graham Berry

== Events ==
- 8 February – Bushranger Ned Kelly and his gang raid the town of Jerilderie, New South Wales, locking up the town's two policemen, stealing their uniforms, cutting the telegraph lines and robbing the bank. Kelly also pens the famous Jerilderie Letter.
- 19 February – The foundation stone is laid and construction begins on the Royal Exhibition Building in Carlton, Victoria.
- 6 March – The town of Cleve, South Australia is officially gazetted.
- 17 March – The Municipality of Canterbury is proclaimed.
- 14 April – The first use of a parachute in Australia occurs when Henri L 'Estrange's balloon ruptures above Melbourne's Agricultural Showgrounds.
- 21 April – From 1879 the eight-hour day was a public holiday in Victoria; it celebrated the stonemasons' strike in 1856.
- 26 April – Seventy square kilometres of land in Sydney's Sutherland Shire is proclaimed The National Park (later the Royal National Park).
- 1 July – The Daily Telegraph newspaper is first published in Sydney.
- 17 September – The Sydney International Exhibition opens at the Garden Palace.
- 13 November – Bushranger Captain Moonlite take thirty hostages at a farm near Gundagai, New South Wales. A shoot-out with police ensues, resulting in the death of a policeman and two members of Moonlite's gang.

== Exploration and settlement ==
- 1 August – Queensland annexes the Torres Strait Islands.
- 3 September – The town of Cunnamulla, Queensland is founded as a coach stop for Cobb & Co stagecoaches.

== Arts and literature ==
- Australian bushranger Ned Kelly dictates the document that later became known as The Jerilderie Letter.

== Sport ==
- 8 February – A controversial umpiring decision at an international cricket match results in the Sydney Riot of 1879.
- 4 November – Darriwell wins the Melbourne Cup.

== Births ==
- 22 February – Norman Lindsay (died 1969), artist and writer
- 10 May – James Alexander Allan (died 1967), poet
- 22 May – Warwick Armstrong (died 1947), cricketer
- 19 June – James Muir Auld (died 1942), artist
- 26 June – Charles Leslie Barrett (died 1959), naturalist, journalist, author and ornithologist
- 24 July – Robert Clyde Packer (died 1934), founder of the Packer media dynasty
- 15 September – Joseph Lyons (died 1939), Premier of Tasmania and 10th Prime Minister of Australia
- 14 October – Miles Franklin (died 1954), writer
- 18 November – CE.W. Bean (died 1968), war journalist
- 26 November – Denis Lutge (died 1953), rugby footballer
- 27 November – Chris McKivat (died 1941), rugby footballer and coach

== Deaths ==
- 15 May – George Fife Angas, Businessman and politician (b. 1789)
- 21 November – Sir Archibald Burt, first Chief Justice of Western Australia (b. 1810)
