= Charles Hardwick =

Charles Hardwick may refer to:

- Charles Hardwick (priest) (1821–1859), English cleric and historian
- Charles Hardwick (antiquary) (1817–1889), English writer known for works related to Lancashire
- Charles Hardwick (judge) (1885–1984), Australian barrister and judge

== See also ==
- Charles Hardwicke (1788–1880), English explorer
