= 1885 in Australia =

- Decades: 1860s; 1870s; 1880s; 1890s; 1900s
- See also: Other events of 1885; Timeline of Australian history

The following lists events that happened during 1885 in Australia.

== Incumbents ==
=== Governors ===
Governors of the Australian colonies:

- Governor of New South Wales – Lord Augustus Loftus (until 9 November), then Lord Carrington (from 12 December)
- Governor of Queensland – Sir Anthony Musgrave
- Governor of South Australia – Sir William Cleaver Francis Robinson, GCMG
- Governor of Tasmania – Major Sir George Strahan
- Governor of Victoria – Sir Henry Loch

=== Premiers ===
Premiers of the Australian colonies:

- Premier of New South Wales – Alexander Stuart (until 6 October), then George Dibbs (until 9 October), then John Robertson (from 22 December)
- Premier of Queensland – Samuel Griffith
- Premier of South Australia – John Colton (until 16 June), then John Downer
- Premier of Tasmania – Adye Douglas
- Premier of Victoria – James Service

== Events ==
- 3 March – The New South Wales Contingent, consisting of an infantry battalion and an artillery battalion, leaves Sydney to fight in the Sudan Campaign.
- 28 March – HMQS Gayundah arrives in Brisbane.
- 1 April – The Cabinet of South Australia meets to discuss the "Russian scare"—the fear that South Australia would come under attack from Russian warships should hostilities between Russia and Britain over Afghanistan result in war.
- 10 August – BHP, later to become the world's largest mining company, is registered as a company in Victoria.
- 4–7 October – Third Intercolonial Trades Union Congress held in Sydney.
- The Geographical Society of Australasia sent an expedition to the Fly River region of Papua New Guinea, naming and exploring the Strickland River.

== Science and technology ==
- 24 March – Hugh Victor McKay patents stripper-harvester.

== Arts and literature ==
- Tom Roberts paintings:
  - Winter morning after rain, Gardiner's Creek
  - The Artists Camp

== Sport ==
- 20 February – The Richmond Football Club is formed.
- 3 November – Sheet Anchor wins the Melbourne Cup.
- 17 October – Caulfield Cup when 16 of the 44 horses competing fell, resulting in the death of 25-year-old jockey Donald Nicolson.

== Births ==
- 8 January – John Curtin (died 1945), Australian Prime Minister
- 26 January – Michael Considine (died 1959), Australian politician
- 29 January – Arthur Halloway (died 1961), rugby league footballer and coach
- 20 March – Vernon Ransford (died 1958), cricketer
- 1 July – Dorothea Mackellar (died 1968), poet
- 12 August – Keith Murdoch (died 1952), journalist and newspaper publisher
- 15 August – Beaumont Smith (died 1950), film director and producer
- 18 August
  - Bede Fanning (died 1970), public servant
  - Nettie Palmer (died 1964), poet and literary critic (wife of Vance Palmer)
- 28 August – Vance Palmer (died 1959), novelist, essayist and critic (husband of Nettie Palmer)
- 22 September – Ben Chifley (died 1951), Australian Prime Minister
- 8 October - Oliver Woodward (died 1966), metallurgist, mine manager and soldier
- 10 October - William John Yuill (died 1960), agricultural writer, dairy industry leader and public servant
- 15 October – Frank Hurley (died 1962), photographer and adventurer
- 7 November – Frank Cheadle, rugby league footballer and World War I soldier (died 1916).

== Deaths ==
- 28 January – Edward Davy (born 1806), scientist
