= List of acts of the Legislative Council of Western Australia from 1889 =

This is a list of acts of the Legislative Council of Western Australia for the year 1889.

== 1889 ==
Short title, or popular name	Citation	Royal assent
Long title
Roads Act 1888 Amendment Act 1889	52 Vict. No. 22	30 April 1889
An Act to amend "The Roads Act, 1888." (Note: Roads Act 1888 (52 Vict. No. 16))
Constitution Act 1889	52 Vict. No. 23	21 October 1890 (Note: Royal assent delayed as the act was reserved for approval by Her Majesty, rather than by the governor.)
An Act to confer a Constitution on Western Australia, and to grant a Civil List to Her Majesty.
Aborigines Act 1889	52 Vict. No. 24	28 October 1890
An Act to provide for certain matters connected with the Aborigines.
Railway Act 1889	53 Vict. No. 1	13 August 1889
An Act to make further provision for the Management and Working of Railways.
	53 Vict. No. 2	13 August 1889
An Act for the Re-appropriation of certain moneys appropriated for the purposes of the Extension of the Telegraph System to Kimberley Goldfields, Wyndham, and South Australian Border in the East Kimberley District.
Chinese Immigration Restriction Act 1889	53 Vict. No. 3	29 November 1889
An Act for the Restriction of Chinese Immigration.
Fishery Act 1889	53 Vict. No. 4	29 November 1889
An Act for the Protection of Fish.
Sand Drift Act 1889	53 Vict. No. 5	29 November 1889
An Act to deal with Sand Drifts and other Nuisances.
Barristers' Board Act 1889	53 Vict. No. 6	29 November 1889
An Act to further amend and to extend an Act intituled "An Act to regulate the Admission in certain cases of Barristers of the Supreme Court of Western Australia, &c." (Note: 45 Vict. No. 1)
Telephone Act 1889	53 Vict. No. 7	29 November 1889
An Act to protect Telephones.
Wines, Beer, and Spirit Sale Act 1880 Amendment Act 1889	53 Vict. No. 8	29 November 1889
An Act to amend "The Wines, Beer, and Spirit Sale Act, 1880." (Note: Wines, Beer, and Spirit Sale Act 1880 (44 Vict. No. 9))
Pearl Shell Duty Reduction Act 1889	53 Vict. No. 9	29 November 1889
An Act to reduce the Duty on Pearl Shell, and for other purposes.
	53 Vict. No. 10	29 November 1889
An Act to confirm certain Expenditure for the year One thousand eight hundred and eighty-eight.
	53 Vict. No. 11	29 November 1889
An Act to provide for the payment of certain Additional and Unforeseen Expenses in the year One thousand eight hundred and eighty-nine, over and above the Estimates for that year.
Life Assurance Companies Act 1889	53 Vict. No. 12	4 December 1889
An Act to regulate Life Assurance.
Water-works Act 1889 (repealed)	53 Vict. No. 13	4 December 1889
An Act to enable Municipal Councils to construct Water Works, or to Contract for a Water Supply. (Repealed by Metropolitan Water and Sewerage Act 1904 (3 Edw. VII. No. 14))
Trustee Investment Act 1889	53 Vict. No. 14	4 December 1889
An Act to extend the powers of Trustees and others with reference to the Investment of Trust Moneys.
Supreme Court Amendment Act 1889	53 Vict. No. 15	4 December 1889
An Act to amend 'The Supreme Court Act, 1880.' (Note: Supreme Court Act 1880 (44 Vict. No. 10))
	53 Vict. No. 16	4 December 1889
An Act to render valid a certain Loan raised by the Municipality of Fremantle, and to indemnify the said Municipality against all legal proceedings consequent on any irregularity or illegality in the mode of the raising of the said Loan.
Law and Parliamentary Library Act 1889	53 Vict. No. 17	4 December 1889
An Act to partially repeal "The Law and Parliamentary Library Act, 1873," (Note: Law and Parliamentary Library Act 1873 (37 Vict. No. 15)) and to repeal "The Law and Parliamentary Library Amendment Act, 1885," (Note: Law and Parliamentary Library Amendment Act 1885 (49 Vict. No. 13)) and to make other provisions in lieu thereof. (Note: Repeals Law and Parliamentary Library Amendment Act 1885)
Wreck Act 1889	53 Vict. No. 18	4 December 1889
An Act to amend "The Wreck Act, 1887." (Note: Wreck Act 1887 (51 Vict. No. 6))
Postage Stamp Act 1889	53 Vict. No. 19	4 December 1889
An Act to amend "The Postage Stamp Ordinance, 1854, Amendment Act, 1887." (Note: Postage Stamp Ordinance 1854 Amendment Act 1887 (51 Vict. No. 15))
Federal Council Referring Act 1889	53 Vict. No. 20	4 December 1889
An Act to refer two several matters to the Federal Council of Australasia for the exercise of Legislative Authority thereon.
	53 Vict. No. 21	4 December 1889
An Act to appropriate the sum of Three Hundred and Fifteen Thousand Two Hundred and Seventy-seven Pounds Thirteen Shillings (Note: £315,077 13s in 1889 is equivalent to A$50,069,000 in 2022.) out of the General Revenue of the Colony for such Services as shall come in course of payment during the year One thousand eight hundred and ninety.
Perth Tramways Act 1889	53 Vict. No. 22	4 December 1889
An Act to confirm a provisional order authorising the construction of Tramways in the City of Perth.
	Provisional Order.	
Electoral Act 1889	53 Vict. No. 23	26 June 1890
An Act to consolidate and amend the Law relating to Elections to the Legislature.

== Sources ==
- "legislation.wa.gov.au".
