= 1883 in Australia =

- Decades: 1860s; 1870s; 1880s; 1890s; 1900s
- See also: Other events of 1883; Timeline of Australian history

The following lists events that happened during 1883 in Australia.

== Incumbents ==
=== Governors ===
Governors of the Australian colonies:

- Governor of New South Wales – Lord Augustus Loftus
- Governor of Queensland – Sir Arthur Edward Kennedy GCMG CB/Sir Anthony Musgrave GCMG
- Governor of South Australia – Sir William Jervois then Sir William Robinson
- Governor of Tasmania – Major Sir George Strahan
- Governor of Victoria – George Phipps, 2nd Marquess of Normanby

=== Premiers ===
Premiers of the Australian colonies:

- Premier of New South Wales – Sir Henry Parkes until 5 January then Alexander Stuart
- Premier of Queensland – Thomas McIlwraith until 13 November then Samuel Griffith
- Premier of South Australia – John Cox Bray
- Premier of Tasmania – William Giblin
- Premier of Victoria – Bryan O'Loghlen until 8 March then James Service

== Events ==
- The J. Boag & Son brewery is established in Launceston, Tasmania.
- 12 June – The first Australasian headquarters of the Salvation Army opened in Melbourne.
- 14 June – A rail service between Sydney and Melbourne commences when the NSW and Victorian rail systems are joined at Albury.
- 1 October – Sydney Boys High School is founded in Sydney, New South Wales. It is the first boys public school in Australia.
- 26 November – An Australasian Inter-Colonial Conference is held in Sydney. Federation and annexation of surrounding islands are discussed by the Australian colonies, New Zealand and Fiji.

== Exploration and settlement ==
- Boundary rider Charles Rath discovers the Line of Lode, a massive silver deposit near the town of Broken Hill, New South Wales.

== Sport ==
- 30 January – England defeats Australia 2–1 in the 1882–83 Test cricket series, reclaiming "The Ashes" of English cricket.
- November – Martini-Henry wins the Melbourne Cup
- 2 November –The Northern Rugby Union (later renamed Queensland Rugby Union) is formed at a meeting in Brisbane
- Petersham Rugby Union Football Club formed in Sydney NSW

== Births ==
- 16 March – Ethel Anderson (died 1958), poet, author, and painter
- 12 April – Dally Messenger, (died 1959), rugby footballer
- 15 April – Stanley Bruce (died 1967), 8th Prime Minister of Australia
- 30 May – Sandy Pearce (died 1930), rugby league footballer and boxer
- 1 July – Micky Dore (died 1910), rugby league footballer
- 1 September – Robert Graves (died 1958), rugby footballer
- 12 December – William Baylebridge (died 1943), poet and short story writer

== Deaths ==
- 5 January – Charles Tompson (born 1806), poet
- 18 August – Roger William Bede Vaughan (born 1834), Archbishop of Sydney
