= 1884 in Australia =

- Decades: 1860s; 1870s; 1880s; 1890s; 1900s
- See also: Other events of 1884; Timeline of Australian history

The following lists events that happened during 1884 in Australia.

== Incumbents ==
=== Governors ===
Governors of the Australian colonies:

- Governor of New South Wales – Lord Augustus Loftus
- Governor of South Australia – William Cleaver Francis Robinson
- Governor of Tasmania – Major Sir George Strahan
- Governor of Victoria – George Phipps, 2nd Marquess of Normanby then William Foster Stawell

=== Premiers ===
Premiers of the Australian colonies:

- Premier of New South Wales – Alexander Stuart
- Premier of South Australia – Sir John Cox Bray until 16 June then John Colton
- Premier of Tasmania – William Giblin until 15 August then Adye Douglas
- Premier of Victoria – James Service

== Events ==
- 13 March – Daisy Bates married Breaker Morant.
- 16 June – The South Australian government of John Bray lost a no confidence motion over the introduction of a new tax and Bray was replaced as premier by the opposition leader John Colton.
- October – Billy Hughes migrated to Australia.

== Sport ==
- November – Malua wins the Melbourne Cup

== Births ==
- 8 February – Reginald "Snowy" Baker (died 1953), sportsman and actor
- 16 December – John Gunn (died 1959), Premier of South Australia
- 22 December – Bartlett Adamson (died 1951), journalist, poet, author and political activist

== Deaths ==
- 25 January – James Francis (born 1819), Premier of Victoria
- 22 February – Sir Charles Sladen (born 1816), Premier of Victoria
