= List of acts of the Parliament of Victoria from 1896 =

This is a list of acts of the Parliament of Victoria, Australia for the year 1896.

== 1896 ==
Short title, or popular name	Citation	Royal assent
Long title
Moolap Salt Works Act 1896 (repealed)	59 Vict. No. 1411	29 January 1896
An Act to authorize the granting of a Lease of certain Grown Land in the Parish of Moolap as a Site for the Manufacture of Salt. (Repealed by Statute Law Revision Act 1995 (No. 11 of 1995))
Police Regulation Act 1896 (repealed)	59 Vict. No. 1412	29 January 1896
An Act to amend the Police Regulation Act 1890. (Note: Police Regulation Act 1890 (54 Vict. No. 1127)) (Repealed by Police Regulation Act 1915 (6 Geo. V. No. 2709))
Electric Light and Power Act 1896 (repealed)	59 Vict. No. 1413	10 February 1896
An Act to facilitate and regulate the supply of Electricity for Lighting and for other purposes. (Repealed by Electric Light and Power Act 1915 (6 Geo. V. No. 2645))
Licensing Act 1896 (repealed)	59 Vict. No. 1414	10 February 1896
An Act to provide for the carrying on of the Business of Licensed Persons in certain circumstances and to provide for the transfer and renewal of certain Licences. (Repealed by Licensing Act 1915 (6 Geo. V. No. 2683))
Gaols Act 1896 (repealed)	59 Vict. No. 1415	10 February 1896
An Act to amend the Gaols Act 1890 (Note: Gaols Act 1890 (54 Vict. No. 1096)) and for other purposes. (Repealed by Gaols Act 1915 (6 Geo. V. No. 2659))
Married Women's Property Act 1896 (repealed)	59 Vict. No. 1416	10 February 1896
An Act to amend the Married Women's Property Act 1890. (Note: Married Women's Property Act 1890 (54 Vict. No. 1116)) (Repealed by Married Women's Property Act 1915 (6 Geo. V. No. 2692))
Voluntary Conveyances Act 1896 (repealed)	59 Vict. No. 1417	10 February 1896
An Act to amend the Law relating to the Avoidance of Voluntary Conveyances. (Repealed by Real Property Act 1915 (6 Geo. V. No. 2719))
Friendly Societies Actuary's Act 1896	59 Vict. No. 1418	10 February 1896
An Act to provide for the Transfer of certain Powers and Duties from the Government Statist to the Actuary for Friendly Societies.
Intestates' Estates Act 1896 (repealed)	69 Vict. No. 1419	10 February 1896
An Act to amend the Law by making better provision for the Widows of certain Intestates in the distribution of such Intestates' Property. (Repealed by Administration and Probate Act 1915 (6 Geo. V. No. 2611))
Jumbunna and Outtrim Railway Construction Act 1895 Amendment Act 1896	59 Vict. No. 1420	10 February 1896
An Act to amend the Jumbunna and Outtrim Railway Construction Act 1895. (Note: Jumbunna and Outtrim Railway Construction Act 1895 (58 Vict. No. 1371))
Trusts Act 1896	59 Vict. No. 1421	20 February 1896
An Act to amend the Law relating to Trusts and Trustees.
Sale of Goods Act 1896 (repealed)	59 Vict. No. 1422	20 February 1896
An Act for codifying the Law relating to the Sale of Goods. (Repealed by Goods Act 1915 (6 Geo. V. No. 2663))
Instruments Act 1896 (repealed)	59 Vict. No. 1423	20 February 1895
An Act to further amend the Instruments Act 1890. (Note: Instruments Act 1890 (54 Vict. No. 1103)) (Repealed by Instruments Act 1915 (6 Geo. V. No. 2672))
Book Debts Act 1896 (repealed)	59 Vict. No. 1424	20 February 1896
An Act relating to the Assignment or Transfer of Book Debts. (Repealed by Instruments Act 1915 (6 Geo. V. No. 2672))
Water Act 1896	59 Vict. No. 1425	20 February 1896
An Act relating to the Making and Levying of Rates within an Urban District under the Water Act 1890 (Note: Water Act 1890 (54 Vict. No. 1156)) and for the Abolition of Fees for Summonses to recover Rates and Charges under the said Act.
Marine Act 1896 (repealed)	59 Vict. No. 1426	20 February 1896
An Act to further amend the Marine Act 1890. (Note: Marine Act 1890 (54 Vict. No. 1165)) (Repealed by Marine Act 1915 (6 Geo. V. No. 2688))
Electoral Districts Boundaries Amendment Act 1896	59 Vict. No. 1427	20 February 1896
An Act to rectify the Boundaries of the Gippsland West and Mornington Electoral Districts and certain Divisions thereof.
Mallee Lands Act 1896 (repealed)	59 Vict. No. 1428	20 February 1896
An Act relating to Mallee Lands. (Repealed by Land Act 1901 (1 Edw. VII. No. 1749))
	59 Vict. No. 1429	27 February 1896
An Act to apply a sum out of the Consolidated Revenue to the service of the year ending on the thirtieth day of June One thousand eight hundred and ninety-six and to appropriate the Supplies granted in this Session of Parliament.
Theatres Act 1896 (repealed)	59 Vict. No. 1430	2 March 1896
An Act to amend the Theatres Act 1890. (Note: Theatres Act 1890 (54 Vict. No. 1144)) (Repealed by Theatres Act 1915 (6 Geo. V. No. 2735))
Width of Tires Act 1896 (repealed)	59 Vict. No. 1431	2 March 1896
An Act to regulate the Weights to be carried on certain Vehicles and for other purposes. (Repealed by Local Government Act 1903 (3 Edw. VII. No. 1893))
Vegetation Diseases Act 1896 (repealed)	59 Vict. No. 1432	2 March 1896
An Act relating to Disease affecting Vegetation. (Repealed by Vegetation and Vine Diseases Act 1915 (6 Geo. V. No. 2744))
Seed Advances Act 1896	59 Vict. No. 1433	6 March 1896
An Act to enable Seed to be advanced on certain terms to Cultivators of Land.
Vermin-proof Fences Advances Act 1896 or the Vermin Proof Fences Advances Act 1896 (repealed)	59 Vict. No. 1434	6 March 1896
An Act to authorize Advances to Municipalities for the purchase of Wire Netting. (Repealed by Vermin Destruction Act 1915 (6 Geo. V. No. 2745))
Nunawading Lands Exchange Act 1896 (repealed)	59 Vict. No. 1435	6 March 1896
An Act to authorize the Exchange of certain Land in the Parish of Nunawading between the Board of Land and Works the Nunawading Shire Council and the Education Department and for other purposes. (Repealed by Statute Law Revision Act 1984 (No. 10087))
Street Betting Suppression Act 1896 (repealed)	59 Vict. No. 1436	6 March 1896
An Act to Suppress Betting in Streets and for other purposes. (Repealed by Police Offences Act 1912 (3 Geo. V. No. 2422))
Railway Loan Application Act 1896	59 Vict. No. 1437	6 March 1896
An Act to sanction the expenditure of Moneys available under Loan Acts for Railways and other purposes and to prevent the further issue of Moneys under the authority of certain Railway Loan Application Acts.
Boort Land Act 1896	59 Vict. No. 1438	6 March 1896
An Act to revoke the Permanent Reservation of certain Crown Land in the parish of Boort.
Railways Act 1896 (repealed)	59 Vict. No. 1439	6 March 1896
An Act to further amend the Law relating to the Victorian Railways. (Repealed by Railway Lands Acquisition Act 1915 (6 Geo. V. No. 2715))
Beet Sugar Works Act 1896 (repealed)	59 Vict. No. 1440	6 March 1896
An Act to encourage the Establishment of the Sugar Beet Industry in Victoria. (Repealed by Beet Sugar Works Act 1915 (6 Geo. V. No. 2620))
Land Act 1896 (repealed)	59 Vict. No. 1441	7 March 1896
An Act to extend the provisions of the Land Acts with regard to the granting of Leases and Licences. (Repealed by Land Act 1901 (1 Edw. VII. No. 1749))
Companies Act Amendment Act 1896	59 Vict. No. 1442	7 March 1896
An Act to amend the Companies Act Amendment Act 1892. (Note: Companies Act Amendment Act 1892 (56 Vict. No. 1269))
Australasian Federation Enabling Act 1896	59 Vict. No. 1443	7 March 1896
An Act to enable Victoria to take part in the framing acceptance and enactment of a Federal Constitution for Australasia.
Treasury Deposits Interest Act 1896	60 Vict. No. 1444	22 July 1896
An Act to authorize the payment of Interest on certain Deposits in the Treasury.
Factories and Shops Act 1896 (repealed)	60 Vict. No. 1445	28 July 1896
An Act to amend the Factories and Shops Act 1890 (Note: Factories and Shops Act 1890 (54 Vict. No. 1091)) and for other purposes. (Repealed by Factories and Shops Act 1905 (5 Edw. VII. No. 1975))
	60 Vict. No. 1446	28 July 1896
An Act to apply out of the Consolidated Revenue the sum of One million one hundred and sixty-eight thousand seven hundred and ninety-six pounds to the service of the year One thousand eight hundred and ninety-six and ninety-seven.
Yarra Improvement Act 1896 (repealed)	60 Vict. No. 1447	6 August 1896
An Act to provide for the Reduction of Floods in the River Yarra Yarra within the Cities of Melbourne Richmond and Prahran and for other purposes. (Repealed by Statute Law Revision Act 1984 (No. 10087))
Adulteration of Seeds Act 1896 (repealed)	60 Vict. No. 1448	6 August 1896
An Act to prevent the Adulteration of Seeds and to regulate the Sale of Seeds Trees Shrubs and Vines. (Repealed by Seeds Act 1910 (1 Geo. V. No. 2273))
Local Government Elections Act 1896 (repealed)	60 Vict. No. 1449	12 August 1896
An Act to further amend the Local Government Act 1890. (Note: Local Government Act 1890 (54 Vict. No. 1112)) (Repealed by Local Government Act 1903 (3 Edw. VII. No. 1893))
	60 Vict. No. 1450	21 September 1896
An Act to apply out of the Consolidated Revenue the sum of One hundred and one thousand and nineteen pounds to the service of the year One thousand eight hundred and ninety-five and ninety-six.
Treasury Bonds Act 1896	60 Vict. No. 1451	21 September 1896
An Act to authorize the issue of Treasury Bonds.
Melbourne City Elections Act 1896	60 Vict. No. 1452	21 September 1896
An Act to give to all Ratepayers the right to vote at all Elections for the City Council of Melbourne.
Municipal Councillors' Indemnity Act 1896	60 Vict. No. 1453	30 October 1896
An Act to further amend the Local Government Act 1890.
	60 Vict. No. 1454	30 October 1896
An Act to apply out of the Consolidated Revenue the sum of Six hundred and seventy thousand seven hundred and seventy-eight pounds to the service of the year One thousand eight hundred and ninety-six and ninety-seven.
Coroners Act 1896 (repealed)	60 Vict. No. 1455	16 November 1896
An Act to amend the Coroners Act 1890. (Note: Coroners Act 1890 (54 Vict. No. 1077)) (Repealed by Coroners Act 1911 (2 Geo. V. No. 2343))
Powder Magazines Act 1896 (repealed)	60 Vict. No. 1456	16 November 1896
An Act to authorize an exchange of land between Her Majesty and the proprietors of certain lands in the parish of Truganina required by Her Majesty for the establishment of Powder Magazines, and to authorize the construction by the State of a Tramway to such Magazines. (Repealed by Statute Law Revision Act 1995 (No. 11 of 1995))
Explosives Act 1896 (repealed)	60 Vict. No. 1457	16 November 1896
An Act to amend the Explosives Act 1890. (Note: Explosives Act 1890 (54 Vict. No. 1090)) (Repealed by Explosives Act 1915 (6 Geo. V. No. 2648))
Justices Act 1896 (repealed)	60 Vict. No. 1458	27 November 1896
An Act to amend the Justices Act 1890 (Note: Justices Act 1890 (54 Vict. No. 1105)) and for other purposes. (Repealed by Justices Act 1915 (6 Geo. V. No. 2675))
Municipalities' Advances Act 1896	60 Vict. No. 1459	14 December 1896
An Act to amend the Municipalities' Advances Act 1895. (Note: Municipalities' Advances Act 1895 (59 Vict. No. 1398))
Municipal Overdrafts (Indemnity) Act 1896	60 Vict. No. 1460	14 December 1896
An Act to indemnify the Councillors of various Municipalities for Borrowing Moneys by Overdrafts on Bankers for the purposes of their Municipalities contrary to the provisions of the Local Government Act 1890 and for other purposes.
Mining Development Act 1896 (repealed)	60 Vict. No. 1461	14 December 1896
An Act to subsidize and enable Companies to further develop Gold Mining and for other purposes. (Repealed by Mining Development Act 1915 (6 Geo. V. No. 2699))
Aliens Act 1896	60 Vict. No. 1462	24 December 1896
An Act to amend the Aliens Act 1890. (Note: Aliens Act 1890 (54 Vict. No. 1063))
Game Act 1896 (repealed)	60 Vict. No. 1463	24 December 1896
An Act to amend the Game Act 1890. (Note: Game Act 1890 (54 Vict. No. 1095)) (Repealed by Game Act 1915 (6 Geo. V. No. 2653))
Federal Council Referring Act (Victoria) 1896 (repealed)	60 Vict. No. 1464	24 December 1894
An Act to refer certain matters to the Federal Council of Australasia for the exercise of Legislative Authority thereon. (Repealed by Statute Law Repeals Act 2007 (No. 21 of 2007))
Water Supply Loans Application Act 1896	60 Vict. No. 1465	24 December 1896
An Act to sanction the issue and application of certain sums of money as Loans for Water Supply and Irrigation Works in the Country Districts and for other purposes.
	60 Vict. No. 1466	24 December 1896
An Act to further continue in force Part III. of the Employers and Employés Act 1890. (Note: Employers and Employés Act 1890 (54 Vict. No. 1087)) (Repealed by Employers and Employés Act 1915 (6 Geo. V. No. 2646))
Income Tax Act 1896 (repealed)	60 Vict. No. 1467	24 December 1896
An Act to declare the Rates of Duties of Income Tax for the Year ending on the thirty-first day of December One thousand eight hundred and ninety-seven and to amend the Income Tax Act 1895. (Note: Income Tax Act 1895 (58 Vict. No. 1374)) (Repealed by Income Tax Act 1915 (6 Geo. V. No. 2668))
Victorian Government Stock Act 1896 (repealed)	60 Vict. No. 1468	24 December 1896
An Act to authorize the Raising of Money for the Redemption of Victorian Government Stock and other purposes. (Repealed by Treasury Legislation (Repeal) Act 2005 (No. 73 of 2005))
Poisons Act 1896 (repealed)	60 Vict. No. 1469	24 December 1896
An Act to amend the Poisons Act 1890. (Note: Poisons Act 1890 (54 Vict. No. 1125)) (Repealed by Poisons Act 1915 (6 Geo. V. No. 2707))
Railway Loan Application Act 1896 (No. 2)	60 Vict. No. 1470	24 December 1896
An Act to sanction the Expenditure of Moneys available under Loan Acts for Railways.
Customs Act 1896	60 Vict. No. 1471	24 December 1896
An Act to amend the Customs Act 1890 (Note: Customs Act 1890 (54 Vict. No. 1081)) and for other purposes.
Northcote Loan Act 1896	60 Vict. No. 1472	24 December 1896
An Act to authorize the Town of Northcote to construct certain permanent Works and Undertakings in lieu of certain other permanent Works and Undertakings.
Public Service Retrenchment Limitation Act 1896	60 Vict. No. 1473	24 December 1896
An Act providing for the continuance in force for certain limited times of the Rates of Reductions of Salaries provided for in the Public Service Retrenchment Act 1893. (Note: Public Service Retrenchment Act 1893 (57 Vict. No. 1313))
Railways Commissioners' Superannuation Act 1895 Amendment Act 1896	60 Vict. No. 1474	24 December 1896
An Act to amend the Railways Commissioners' Superannuation Act 1895. (Note: Railways Commissioners Superannuation Act 1895 (58 Vict. No. 1377))
Beet Sugar Works Amendment Act 1896 (repealed)	60 Vict. No. 1475	24 December 1896
An Act to amend the Beet Sugar Works Act 1896. (Note: Beet Sugar Works Act 1896 (59 Vict. No. 1440)) (Repealed by Beet Sugar Works Act 1915 (6 Geo. V. No. 2620))
Factories and Shops Amendment Act 1896 (repealed)	60 Vict. No. 1476	24 December 1896
An Act to amend the Factories and Shops Act 1896. (Note: Factories and Shops Act 1896 (60 Vict. No. 1445)) (Repealed by Factories and Shops Act 1905 (5 Edw. VII. No. 1975))
Mildura Trust Loan Act 1896	60 Vict. No. 1477	24 December 1896
An Act to authorize the granting of a Loan to the First Mildura Irrigation Trust and for other purposes.
Crimes Act 1890 Amendment Act 1896 (repealed)	60 Vict. No. 1478	24 December 1896
An Act to amend the Crimes Act 1890. (Note: Crimes Act 1890 (54 Vict. No. 1079)) (Repealed by Crimes Act 1915 (6 Geo. V. No. 2637))
Local Government Act 1896 (repealed)	60 Vict. No. 1479	24 December 1896
An Act to further amend the Local Government Act 1890. (Repealed by Local Government Act 1903 (3 Edw. VII. No. 1893))
	60 Vict. No. 1480	24 December 1896
An Act to apply a sum out of the Consolidated Be venue to the service of the year ending on the thirtieth day of June One thousand eight hundred and ninety-seven and to appropriate the Supplies granted in this Session of Parliament.
Savings Banks Act 1890 Amendment Act 1896	60 Vict. No. 1481	24 December 1896
An Act to amalgamate the Post Office Savings Bank and the Commissioners' Savings Banks, to amend the Savings Banks Act 1890, (Note: Savings Banks Act 1890 (54 Vict. No. 1138)) to enable advances to be made and for other purposes.
Companies Act 1896 (repealed)	60 Vict. No. 1482	24 December 1896
An Act to further amend the Companies Act 1890 (Note: Companies Act 1890 (54 Vict. No. 1074)) and for other purposes. (Repealed by Companies Act 1915 (6 Geo. V. No. 2631))

== Sources ==
- "1896 Victorian Historical Acts". AustLII.
