= 1880 Birthday Honours =

Appointments by Queen Victoria to various orders and honours

The 1880 Birthday Honours were appointments by Queen Victoria to various orders and honours to reward and highlight good works by citizens of the British Empire. The appointments were made to celebrate the official birthday of the Queen, and were published in The London Gazette on 28 May 1880.

The recipients of honours are displayed here as they were styled before their new honour, and arranged by honour, with classes (Knight, Knight Grand Cross, etc.) and then divisions (Military, Civil, etc.) as appropriate.

== United Kingdom and British Empire ==
=== The Most Distinguished Order of Saint Michael and Saint George ===
Star of the Order of Saint Michael and Saint George

==== Knight Grand Cross of the Order of St Michael and St George (GCMG) ====
- His Royal Highness Prince Leopold George Duncan Albert, Duke of Saxony, Prince of Saxe Cobourg and Gotha KG KT GCSI
- General Sir Arthur Borton KCB Governor of the Island of Malta

==== Knight Commander of the Order of St Michael and St George (KCMG) ====
- Major George Cumine Strahan CMG Governor, of the Colony of Tasmania
- Frederick Aloysius Weld CMG Governor of the Straits Settlements
- William Vallance Whiteway, Attorney-General and Premier of the Island of Newfoundland

==== Companion of the Order of St Michael and St George (CMG) ====
- Captain Arthur Elibank Havelock, Chief Civil Commissioner for the Seychelles Islands
- Alfred Domett, late Secretary for Crown Lands and Prime Minister for the Colony of New Zealand
- John Bates Thurston, Colonial Secretary and Auditor-General of Fiji
- Cecil Clementi Smith, Colonial Secretary for the Straits Settlements
- Francis John Villiers, Acting Colonial Secretary, Griqualand West
