= 1881 in Australia =

- Decades: 1860s; 1870s; 1880s; 1890s; 1900s
- See also: Other events of 1881; Timeline of Australian history

The following lists events that happened during 1881 in Australia.

== Incumbents ==
=== Governors ===
Governors of the Australian colonies:

- Governor of New South Wales – Lord Augustus Loftus
- Governor of Queensland – Sir Arthur Kennedy
- Governor of South Australia – Sir William Jervois
- Governor of Tasmania – Major Sir George Strahan
- Governor of Victoria – George Phipps, Marquess of Normanby
- Governor of Western Australia – Sir William Robinson

=== Premiers ===
Premiers of the Australian colonies:

- Premier of New South Wales – Sir Henry Parkes
- Premier of Queensland – Thomas McIlwraith
- Premier of South Australia – William Morgan till 24 June then Sir John Cox Bray
- Premier of Tasmania – William Giblin
- Premier of Victoria – Graham Berry until 9 July then James Service

== Events ==
- 28 June – The Art Gallery of South Australia opened by Prince Albert Victor of the United Kingdom.

== Census ==
In the mid-19th century the colonial statisticians encouraged compatibility between the colonies in their respective censuses, and in 1881 a census was held simultaneously in each of the colonies. This was part of a census of the British Empire. The questions posed in the colonies were not uniform.

The population of Australia was 2,250,194.

1881 census results
NSW	Vic	Qld	Tas	SA	NT	WA	Australia
751,468	862,346	213,525	115,704	276,414	9,797	29,708	2,250,194

Northern Territory was counted within South Australia (286,211) and was 3,451 plus 6,346 Aboriginals in settled districts. The population of Western Australia did not include full-blood Aborigines.

The population of greater Melbourne was 282,947 and of Sydney was 224,939.

== Sport ==
- Zulu wins the Melbourne Cup

== Births ==
- 10 January - Leslie Rainey, cricketer, footballer and tennis player (died 1962).
- 6 April - Frank Leslie Thomson Wilmot, Australian poet (died 1942).
- 11 September - William Jolly, first Lord Mayor of Brisbane (died 1955).
- 28 October - Vin Coutie, footballer (died 1951).

== Deaths ==
- 2 August - Marcus Clarke, author (born 1846)
