= 1887 in Australia =

- Decades: 1860s; 1870s; 1880s; 1890s; 1900s
- See also: Other events of 1887; Timeline of Australian history

The following lists events that happened during 1887 in Australia.

== Incumbents ==
- Premier of New South Wales – Patrick Jenning (until 19 January), then Henry Parkes
- Premier of South Australia – John Downer (until 11 June), then Thomas Playford II
- Premier of Queensland – Samuel Griffith
- Premier of Tasmania – James Agnew (until 29 March), then Philip Fysh
- Premier of Victoria – Duncan Gillies
- Governor of the Crown Colony of Western Australia – Sir Frederick Broome

== Events ==
- 1 January – Clement Wragge is appointed Government Meteorologist for Queensland
- 21 January – Brisbane receives a daily rainfall of 465 millimetres (18.3 inches), a record for any Australian capital city.
- 23 March – 81 miners are killed during a coal gas explosion at Bulli, New South Wales
- 22 April – A cyclone hits a pearling fleet off Eighty Mile Beach, 120 men drown.
- 11 May – Ship Darling Downs with 7725 bales of Australian wool sinks at Nore after collision with Britannia
- 22 June – The Fremantle Town Hall is opened.
- 26 Sept – The Celtic Club Melbourne is formed and remains today as Australia's oldest Irish Club
- 19 October – The Sydney-bound steamer SS Cheviot is wrecked near Point Nepean, Victoria, claiming 35 lives.

== Science and technology ==
- Construction of Goulburn Weir commenced, one of Australia's earliest irrigation schemes.

== Sport ==
- Dunlop wins the Melbourne Cup

== Births ==
- 2 February – Pat Sullivan, film director (died 1933)
- 16 April – Henry Gordon Bennett, soldier (died 1962)
- 6 July – Annette Kellerman, swimming celebrity (died 1975)
- 28 October – Herb Byrne, Australian rules footballer (died 1959)
- 30 November – Beatrice Kerr, swimmer, diver, and aquatic performer (died 1971)
