= List of acts of the Parliament of Victoria from 1885 =

This is a list of acts of the Parliament of Victoria, Australia for the year 1885.

== 1885 ==
The fourth session of the twelfth parliament of Victoria.

Short title, or popular name	Citation	Royal assent
Long title
	49 Vict. No. 832	15 July 1885
An Act to render it unnecessary for Justices heretofore appointed to again take the Oaths required by Law.
	49 Vict. No. 833	23 July 1885
An Act to apply out of the Consolidated Revenue the sum of One million six hundred and twenty-four thousand pounds to the service of the year One thousand eight hundred and eighty-five and six.
Supreme Court Amending Act 1885 (repealed)	49 Vict. No. 834	10 August 1885
An Act to make provision for the appointment of an Acting Judge of the Supreme Court and for other purposes. (Repealed by Supreme Court Act 1890 (54 Vict. No. 1142))
Protection of Public Buildings Act 1885 (repealed)	49 Vict. No. 835	14 August 1885
An Act to make provision for the Protection from Fire of certain Public Buildings in Melbourne. (Repealed by Public Account (Trust Funds) Act 1982 (No. 9861))
Melbourne Tramways Trust Amendment Act 1885	49 Vict. No. 836	28 October 1885
An Act to further facilitate the Borrowing of Money by the Melbourne Tramways Trust for the Construction of Tramways.
	49 Vict. No. 837	28 October 1885
An Act to apply out of the Consolidated Revenue the sum of Eight hundred and four thousand pounds to the service of the year One thousand eight hundred and eighty-five and six.
Hotham Municipal Buildings Site Act 1885	49 Vict. No. 838	8 December 1885
An Act to enable the Mayor Councillors and Burgesses of the Town of Hotham to demise for terms of years certain lands vested in them and to validate a lease to the Crown heretofore made by the said Mayor Councillors and Burgesses.
Union Trustees Executors and Administrators' Company Act 1885	49 Vict. No. 839	8 December 1885
An Act to confer powers upon the Union Trustees Executors and Administrators'Company Limited.
Perpetual Executors and Trustees' Association Act 1885	49 Vict. No. 840	8 December 1885
An Act to confer powers upon the Australian Executors and Trustees Association Limited.
Lodgers' Protection Act 1885 (repealed)	49 Vict. No. 841	8 December 1885
An Act to Protect the Interests of Lodgers. (Repealed by Landlord and Tenant Act 1890 (54 Vict. No. 1108))
	49 Vict. No. 842	8 December 1885
An Act to amend "The Executors Company's Act" (Note: Executors Company's Act 1879 (42 Vict. No. 644)) and to confer additional powers upon the Trustees Executors and Agency Company Limited.
The (Victorian) Federal Council Act 1885 (repealed)	49 Vict. No. 843	9 December 1885
An Act to bring into operation in respect of the Colony of Victoria an Act of the Imperial Parliament intituled "An Act to Constitute a Federal Council of Australasia." (Note: Federal Council of Australasia Act 1885 (48 & 49 Vict. c. 60 (Imp))) (Repealed by Statute Law Repeals Act 2007 (No. 21 of 2007))
Administration of Justice Act 1885	49 Vict. No. 844	14 December 1885
An Act to make better provision for the Administration of Justice.
Railway Loan Act 1885	49 Vict. No. 845	14 December 1885
An Act to authorize the Raising of Money for Railways and Irrigation works and for other purposes.
	49 Vict. No. 846	18 December 1885
An Act to apply a sum out of the Consolidated Revenue to the service of the year ending on the thirtieth day of June One thousand eight hundred and eighty-six and to appropriate the Supplies granted in this Session of Parliament.
Hospitals and Charitable Institutions Amending Act 1885 (repealed)	49 Vict. No. 847	18 December 1885
An Act to further amend an Act intituled "An Act for Hospitals and Charitable Institutions." (Note: Hospitals and Charitable Institutions Act 1864 (27 Vict. No. 220)) (Repealed by Hospitals and Charities Act 1890 (54 Vict. No. 1099))
Loans Application Act 1885	49 Vict. No. 848	18 December 1885
An Act to apply certain Moneys raised under Acts Numbers DCVIII (Note: Railway Loan Act 1878 (42 Vict. No. 608)) and DCCCV (Note: Victorian Debentures Redemption and Loan Act 1884 (48 Vict. No. 805) but not required for the purposes for which the Moneys were appropriated.
Free Libraries Act 1885 (repealed)	49 Vict. No. 849	18 December 1885
An Act to enable Trustees and Committees of Management of Free Libraries Reading Rooms Mechanics' Institutes and Trades' Halls to demise certain lands for terms of years and to raise Loans on the Rents of such lands and buildings and for other purposes. (Repealed by Libraries Act 1890 (54 Vict. No. 1110))
Justices of the Peace Act 1885	49 Vict. No. 850	18 December 1885
An Act to amend the law relating to Justices of the Peace.
Companies' Wages Act 1885 (repealed)	49 Vict. No. 851	18 December 1885
An Act to make provision for the Preferential Payment on the Winding-up of any Company of One Month's Wages to persons employed by it. (Repealed by Companies Act 1890 (54 Vict. No. 1074))
Bakers and Millers Statute Amendment Act 1885 (repealed)	49 Vict. No. 852	18 December 1885
An Act to amend the law relating to Bakers and Millers. (Repealed by Bakers and Millers Act 1890 (54 Vict. No. 1067))
Explosives Act 1885 (repealed)	49 Vict. No. 853	18 December 1885
An Act to consolidate and amend the Law with respect to manufacturing, carrying, storing, and selling Gunpowder and other explosive substances. (Repealed by Explosives Act 1890 (54 Vict. No. 1090))
Prince's Bridge Act 1885	49 Vict. No. 854	18 December 1885
An Act to authorize the Construction of a Bridge across the River Yarra Yarra in line with Swanston-street in the City of Melbourne and for other purposes.
Survey Boundaries Act 1885 (repealed)	49 Vict. No. 855	18 December 1885
An Act to adjust discrepancies between Surveys and Titles and for other matters. (Repealed by Real Property Act 1890 (54 Vict. No. 1136))
Expiring Laws Continuance Act 1885	49 Vict. No. 856	18 December 1885
An Act to continue various Expiring Laws.
Licensing Act 1885 (repealed)	49 Vict. No. 857	18 December 1885
An Act to amend the Laws relating to the Licensing of Public Houses and the Sale of Fermented and Spirituous Liquors. (Repealed by Licensing Act 1890 (54 Vict. No. 1111))
Pharmacy Act 1885 (repealed)	49 Vict. No. 858	18 December 1885
An Act to amend the "Pharmacy Act 1876." (Note: Pharmacy Act 1876 (40 Vict. No. 558)) (Repealed by Medical Act 1890 (54 Vict. No. 1118))
Victorian Water Conservation Act 1885	49 Vict. No. 859	18 December 1885
An Act to amend "The Victorian Water Conservation Acts 1881-1884."
	49 Vict. No. 860	18 December 1885
An Act to apply out of "The Railway Loan Account 1885" or temporarily out of the Consolidated Revenue certain sums of money for Railway Works and other purposes.
Mining Act 1885 (repealed)	49 Vict. No. 861	18 December 1885
An Act to further amend the "Mining Statute 1865" (Note: Mining Statute 1865 (29 Vict. No. 291)) and to amend the Act No. CCCCXLVI. (Note: Mining Statute 1865 Amendment Act 1872 (36 Vict. No. 446)) and also to amend "The Mining on Private Property Act 1884." (Note: Mining on Private Property Act 1884 (48 Vict. No. 796)) (Repealed by Mines Act 1890 (54 Vict. No. 1120))
Factories and Shops Act 1885 (repealed)	49 Vict. No. 862	18 December 1885
An Act for the supervision and regulation of Factories and Workrooms and for the limitation of the Hours of Trading in Shops and for other purposes. (Repealed by Factories and Shops Act 1890 (54 Vict. No. 1091))
Bills of Lading Act 1885 (repealed)	49 Vict. No. 863	18 December 1885
An Act to amend the Law relating to Bills of Lading. (Repealed by Instruments Act 1890 (54 Vict. No. 1103))
	49 Vict. No. 864	18 December 1885
An Act to provide for a Grant to the Widow and Family of the late James Macpherson Grant. (Note: James Macpherson Grant.)
	49 Vict. No. 865	18 December 1885
An Act to amend "The Thistle Prevention Statute 1865." (Note: Thistle Prevention Statute 1865 (28 Vict. No. 250)) (Repealed by Thistle Act 1890 (54 Vict. No. 1145))
	49 Vict. No. 866	18 December 1885
An Act to enable the President Councillors and Ratepayers of the Shire of Avon to sell and convey certain lands at Stratford and to expend the proceeds of such sale together with other moneys in the erection of a Court House and other buildings.
Local Government Amendment Act 1885	49 Vict. No. 867	18 December 1885
An Act to further amend the "Local Government Act 1874" (Note: Local Government Act 1874 (38 Vict. No. 506)) and for other purposes.
	49 Vict. No. 868	18 December 1885
An Act to further amend the "Real Property Statute 1864." (Note: Real Property Statute 1864 (27 Vict. No. 213)) (Repealed by Real Property Act 1890 (54 Vict. No. 1136))
	49 Vict. No. 869	18 December 1885
An Act to Vest certain Land being portion of Suburban Section 68 in the parish of Jika-Jika and County of Bourke in Her Majesty.
	49 Vict. No. 870	18 December 1885
An Act to further amend the Act No. LXXXVI. intituled "An Act to amend the Law for the Collection and Payment of the Public Moneys the Audit of the Public Accounts and the Protection and Recovery of the Public Property." (Note: 22 Vict. No. 86) (Repealed by Audit Act 1890 (54 Vict. No. 1066))
Agricultural Colleges Act 1885 (repealed)	49 Vict. No. 871	18 December 1885
An Act to amend "The Agricultural Colleges Act 1884." (Note: Agricultural Colleges Act 1884 (48 Vict. No. 825)) (Repealed by Agricultural Colleges Act 1890 (54 Vict. No. 1062))
	49 Vict. No. 872	18 December 1885
An Act to alter and amend the Transfer of Land Statute, (Note: Transfer of Land Statute 1866 (29 Vict. No. 301)) and for other purposes.
	49 Vict. No. 873	18 December 1885
An Act to declare the meaning of certain words in the "Real Property Statute 1864." (Note: Real Property Statute 1864 (27 Vict. No. 213)) (Repealed by Real Property Act 1890 (54 Vict. No. 1136))
Sludge Act 1885	49 Vict. No. 874	18 December 1885
An Act to provide for the Disposal of Sludge from Alluvial Mines in Creswick.
Mallee Amending Act 1885 (repealed)	49 Vict. No. 875	18 December 1885
An Act to further amend "The Mallee Pastoral Leases Act 1883" (Note: Mallee Pastoral Leases Act 1883 (47 Vict. No. 766)) and for other purposes. (Repealed by Land Act 1890 (54 Vict. No. 1106))

== Sources ==
- "1885 Victorian Historical Acts". AustLII.
