= 1882 in Australia =

- Decades: 1860s; 1870s; 1880s; 1890s; 1900s
- See also: Other events of 1882; Timeline of Australian history

The following lists events that happened during 1882 in Australia.

== Incumbents ==
=== Governors ===
Governors of the Australian colonies:

- Governor of New South Wales – Lord Augustus Loftus
- Governor of Queensland – Arthur Edward Kennedy
- Governor of South Australia – Sir William Jervois
- Governor of Tasmania – Major Sir George Strahan
- Governor of Victoria – George Phipps, 2nd Marquess of Normanby
- Governor of Western Australia – (office first formed in 1890)

=== Premiers ===
Premiers of the Australian colonies:

- Premier of New South Wales – Henry Parkes
- Premier of Queensland – Thomas McIlwraith
- Premier of South Australia – John Cox Bray
- Premier of Tasmania – William Giblin
- Premier of Victoria – Sir Bryan O'Loghlen
- Premier of Western Australia – (office first formed in 1890)

== Events ==
- 1 January – Bilateral conventions for the exchange of money orders come into effect between the United States of America and the colonies of New South Wales and Victoria.
- 2 February – A cyclone causes considerable damage to the town of Cardwell, Queensland.
- 8 May – Planning begins on the Working Men's College in Melbourne (now RMIT University).
- 31 May – The steamer Pretty Jane is wrecked on the Ninety Mile Beach, 30 km west of Lakes Entrance. There were no deaths.
- 9 December – Brisbane is the first city in Australia to install electric lighting.

== Science and technology ==
- 6 December – A rare transit of Venus across the disc of the Sun is visible from Australia, and many scientific parties arrive from around the world to observe and record the transit. The next occurrence was June 2004.

== Sport ==
- 17 February – The first cricket Test match at the Sydney Cricket Ground begins.
- 29 August – The Australian cricket team beats England for the first time in a test match at The Oval in London. A mock obituary appears in the next day's Sporting Times, mourning "the death of English cricket", which leads to the creation of The Ashes.
- The Assyrian wins the Melbourne Cup
- 30 December – The first Test of the 1882–83 Ashes tour begins at the Melbourne Cricket Ground.

== Births ==
- 19 January – John Cain snr. (died 1957), Premier of Victoria
- 18 February – Harvey Sutton (died 1963), track and field athlete
- 24 March – Enid Derham (died 1941), poet
- 29 April – Tom Richards (died 1935), Australian rugby union player
- 5 May – Sir Douglas Mawson, geologist and explorer (born in England)
- 8 July – Percy Grainger (died 1961), composer and pianist
- 26 July – Albert Dunstan, (died 1950), Premier of Victoria
- 6 December – Warren Bardsley (died 1954), cricketer

== Deaths ==
- 1 August – Henry Kendall (b. 1839), poet
- 8 September – Robert Johnston (b. 1792), naval officer
- 2 December – Eliza O'Flaherty (b. 1818), writer and stage actress
