= List of acts of the Federal Council of Australasia =

This is a list of acts of the Federal Council of Australasia. It passed a total of ten acts before it was abolished upon the federation of Australia.

== First session ==
The council met in Hobart from 25 January 1886 until 5 February 1886.

It was attended by Victoria, Tasmania, Queensland, Western Australia, and Fiji.

Short title, or popular name	Citation	Royal assent
Long title
Federal Council Interpretation Act 1886	49 Vict. No. 1	5 February 1886
An Act for shortening the language used in Acts of the Federal Council of Australasia.
Federal Council Evidence Act 1886	49 Vict. No. 2	5 February 1886
An Act to facilitate the Proof throughout the Federation of Acts of the Federal Council, and of Acts of the Parliament of the Australasian Colonies, and of Judicial and Official Documents, and of the Signatures of certain Public Officers.
Australasian Civil Process Act 1886 (repealed)	49 Vict. No. 3	5 February 1886
An Act to authorize the Service of Civil Process out of the jurisdiction of the Colony in which it is issued. (Repealed by Service and Execution of Process Act 1901 (No. 11 (Cth)))
Australasian Judgments Act 1886 (repealed)	49 Vict. No. 4	5 February 1886
An Act to make provision for the enforcement within the Federation of Judgments of the Supreme Courts of the Colonies of the Federation. (Repealed by Service and Execution of Process Act 1901 (No. 11 (Cth)))

== Second session ==
The council met in Hobart from 16 January 1888 until 20 January 1888.

It was attended by Victoria, Tasmania, Queensland, and Western Australia.

Short title, or popular name	Citation	Royal assent
Long title
Queensland Pearl Shell and Béche-de-mer Fisheries (Extra-territorial) Act 1888 (repealed)	51 Vict. No. 1	19 July 1888 (Note: This act was reserved for Her Majesty's approval.)
An Act to regulate the Pearl Shell and Béche-de-mer Fisheries in Australasian waters adjacent to the Colony of Queensland. (Repealed by Fisheries Act 1952 (No. 7 (Cth)))

== Third session ==
The council met in Hobart from 29 January 1889 until 5 February 1889.

It was attended by Victoria, Tasmania, Queensland, Western Australia, and South Australia.

Short title, or popular name	Citation	Royal assent
Long title
Western Australian Pearl Shell and Béche-de-mer Fisheries (Extra-Territorial) Act 1889 (repealed)	52 Vict. No. 1	18 January 1890 (Note: This act was reserved for Her Majesty's approval.)
An Act to regulate the Pearl Shell and Béche-de-mer Fisheries in Australasian waters adjacent to the Colony of Western Australia. (Repealed by Fisheries Act 1952 (No. 7 (Cth)))

== Fourth session ==
The council met in Hobart from 20 January 1891 until 23 January 1891.

It was attended by Victoria, Queensland, and Tasmania.

Short title, or popular name	Citation	Royal assent
Long title
Australasian Orders in Lunacy Act 1891	54 Vict. No. 1	23 January 1891
An Act to facilitate the recognition in other colonies of Orders and Declarations of the Supreme Court of any colony in matters of Lunacy.

== Fifth session ==
The council met in Hobart from 26 January 1893 until 3 February 1893.

It was attended by Victoria, Queensland, Tasmania, and Western Australia.

Short title, or popular name	Citation	Royal assent
Long title
Federal Garrisons Act 1893 (repealed)	56 Vict. No. 1	3 February 1893
An Act to make provision for the discipline and government of the garrisons established at King George's Sound and Thursday Island, at the joint expense of the Australian Colonies or some of them. (Repealed by Defence Act 1903 (No. 20 (Cth)))

== Sixth session ==
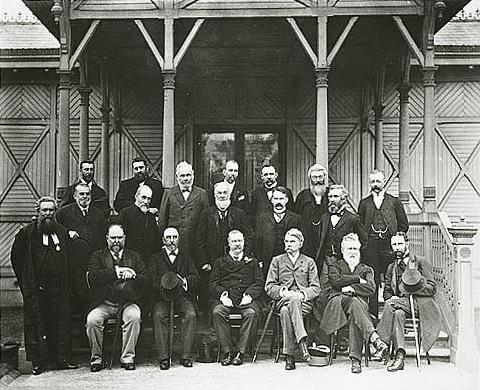
The Federal Council during its final meeting in 1899

The council met from 30 January 1895 until 1 February 1895.

It was attended by Victoria, Tasmania, Queensland, and Western Australia.

No acts were passed.

== Seventh session ==
The council met at Hobart on 26 January 1897 until 29 January 1897.

It was attended by Victoria, Tasmania, Queensland, and Western Australia.

Short title, or popular name	Citation	Royal assent
Long title
Australasian Naturalisation Act 1897	60 Vict. No. 1	1 February 1897
An Act to provide for the Naturalisation within Australasian Colonies, or some of them, of Persons of European descent naturalised in any of such Colonies.
Australasian Testamentary Process Act 1897 (repealed)	60 Vict. No. 2	1 February 1897
An Act to make provision for the enforcement in certain cases within the Australasian Colonies, or some of them, of Orders of the Supreme Courts of such colonies for the production of testamentary instruments. (Repealed by Service and Execution of Process Act 1901 (No. 11 (Cth)))

== Eighth session ==
The council met in January 1899.

No acts were passed.

== Sources ==
- Greville, Edward, ed. (1900). "IX Federal Council of Australasia". The Year-Book of Australia 1900. The Year-Book of Australia & Publishing Company Ltd. p. 330 – via Google Books.
