= Teresa Hamilton =

British activist (1852-1932)

Lady Teresa Hamilton
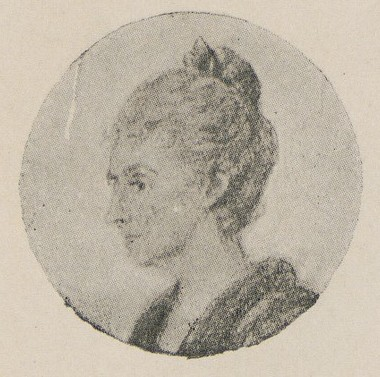
- Born: 1 January 1852
- Died: 21 May 1932 (aged 80); Bath, England
- Known for: Founding The Hamilton Literary Society
- Spouse: Robert Hamilton (married 1877)

Teresa Felicia Hamilton (née Reynolds; 1 January 1852 – 21 May 1932) was a British activist and social reformer. While living in Tasmania, she founded The Hamilton Literary Society (originally known as the Nil Desperandum Society), the oldest continuing literary society in Australia. She also founded the Nursing Band (later the District Nursing Association).

== Early life ==
Teresa Felicia Reynolds was born in 1852, the second daughter of Major Henry Reynolds of the 58th regiment and his wife, Ann (née Cox). Henry Reynolds died when Teresa was seven years old.

Teresa married civil servant Robert Hamilton in 1877, his second wife. She was 25 and he 40. She became step parent to his five children, and the couple had two more.

== Tasmania ==
Robert Hamilton was made Governor of Tasmania in 1887, and the family moved there. One of the Teresa's early acts was to deliver an address to the women of the colony on "Sanitation and Public Health", inspired by nursing their son, who had typhoid. She later worked actively to gather women's support for the passage of the Deep Drainage Bill to improve public sanitation, and became President of the Women's Sanitary Association.

Two years after the founding of The St John's Ambulance Brigade in Hobart in 1887, she instigated lectures on first aid and nursing. She also organised lecture series, and examinations, in first aid in subsequent years.

In 1889, Hamilton founded the Anchorage Refuge Home - a nondenominational organisation for the aid of "fallen women" - which cared for unmarried mothers and their babies, later helping to find them paid work. The same year, Hamilton formed a literary club, the Nil Desperandum Society, for "mutual pleasure and intellectual profit". The Society met fortnightly, with members giving papers on various subjects, followed by discussion. Hamilton also supported other initiatives, such as the Australasian Association for the Advancement of Science, and the Australian Home Reading Union.

In 1891, she formed the Hobart Sketching Club. An admirer of art, Hamilton encouraged the Australian government to purchase a number of works by William Piguenit, who had spoken to the club.

In 1892, she formed the Nursing Band, whose trained members visited the poor and sick. Later that decade, this became the District Nursing Association. Also in 1892, Hamilton helped to establish a convalescent home for "all overworked women needing a rest".

== Later years ==
The Hamiltons returned to England in 1893, and Robert Hamilton died two years later.

Teresa Hamilton continued to write and read widely, maintaining contact with contacts in Tasmania. She maintained support of the Literary Society (now renamed in her honour), including by sending money to cover reunions of this and her sketching club during the 1930s. She was also Secretary of the Pioneer Club during the 1890s.

Teresa Hamilton died in Bath on 21 May 1932, at the age of 80.

== Death and legacy ==
In a paper for the Royal Society of Tasmania, Alison Alexander argued that "Teresa Hamilton left Tasmania with its structure much as it had been before her arrival, but with women of all classes shown how to play a more active role in that structure." Through her work with the Women's Sanitary Association in particular, Alexander suggested the significant impact of the fact that:

women had been seen acting in public, competently running meetings, and trying to change public opinion and to influence Parliament and the City Council.
