= At last she moves =

Informal state motto

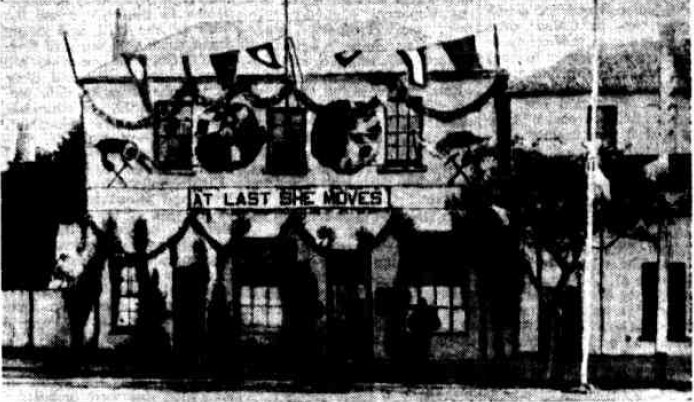
One of the decorations in Perth commemorating responsible government in 1890

At last she moves is a recurring phrase in the history of Western Australia, used to acknowledged long-awaited progress after a period of stagnation.

== Uses ==
Governor Weld first used the phrase in reference to the colony finally gaining representative government in 1870.

When Governor Frederick Broome turned the first sod on the Great Southern Railway at Beverley on 20 October 1886, he again used the phrase, presumably as an allusion to Weld's earlier use.

In October 1890, Governor Robinson returned from England with the news that Western Australia had been granted responsible government. On his arrival at Albany on 18 October 1890, he made a speech in which he used the phrase: "now I think we can venture to say, with all sincerity, and in the full conviction that it will be realised, 'At last she moves.'" Three days later, responsible government was proclaimed in Perth, Western Australia. The city had been decorated in anticipation of celebration of the first Proclamation Day, and one of the highlights was a large banner draped across the front of Edward Keane's store, which read "At Last She Moves" in all capital letters.

The following poem was published in The West Australian in 1891, referring to Perth Boys School, but possibly alluding to above-mentioned usage.

"At Last She Moves."
The High School of Perth is now going ahead
As the match of last Saturday proves.
At last she's been drawn from her oozy mud bed.
At last we can say that she moves.
For two or three years she has gradually sunk
Into lazy and slovenly grooves.
But since the new master has come into power
We safely can say that she moves.
All the idle old ways he firmly puts down
And each foolish habit reproves.
Till at length it's apparent to all the wide world.
That at last the old H.S.P. moves.
