= Julie Vieusseux =

Australian painter and educator

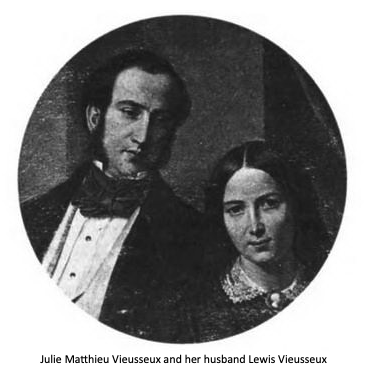
- Julie Matthieu Vieusseux and her husband Lewis Vieusseux
- Born: Julie Elizabeth Agnes Matthieu; 4 August 1818; Netherlands
- Died: 11 March 1878 (aged 59); Melbourne, Victoria, Australia
- Occupations: Painter; educator

Julie Elizabeth Agnes Vieusseux (née Matthieu; 4 August 1818 – 11 March 1878) was an Australian painter and educator. She was the founder and manager of the Vieusseux Ladies' College in Melbourne between 1857 and 1878.

== Life ==
Julie Vieusseux was born in the Netherlands to the Belgian army captain Louis Emile Matthieu and Catherine Van de Winkle. She was educated in Paris. In 1849, she married the English civil engineer, architect and surveyor Lewis Vieusseux. Both were of French Huguenot descent. In 1852, she emigrated with her spouse, two sons and her sister, Henriette Caroline Matthieu, to Melbourne in Australia, arriving at Port Phillip Bay on Fortitude, 13 June 1852.

Henriette did not settle in Melbourne. She returned to Belgium, where she married Philippe Eugene Charles Edouard Donckier De Donceel in 1856.

Julie and Lewis had come to Australia with their two little sons, Lewis born 1850, and Stephen born 1851. Their third son, Edward, had been born in Brighton, Victoria, in 1854. Stephen had died in 1852 at 15 months of age. Lewis had tragically disappeared into the bush when the family was returning from a picnic in 1858, and his remains were not located until 1860. Edward became a qualified civil engineer, but found his true calling as the founder and headmaster, in 1882, of Harkaway College, renamed Berwick Grammar School the following year.

=== Painter ===
Following their arrival in Melbourne, Julie and Lewis moved in the upper circles of Melbourne's social and cultural life. Julie Vieusseux established herself as a painter the same year of her arrival in Australia. On 21 Aug 1852 she placed an advertisement in The Argus stating that her studio was now open in Kyte's Buildings, Collingwood, and she was taking portraits in oils, watercolours and drawings "after the most approved styles". Kyte's Buildings was an enclave of scientists, artists and musicians. Julie also had for sale a painting, Flight into Egypt, from the Flemish School.

On 6 and 7 October 1852 the infant son of Emily and Hugh Childers was taken by his mother to have his sittings at Mme Vieussieux. 'He cried dreadfully while being decked out for the operation but behaved very tolerably afterwards & looked like a Cherub,' according to his mother, whose husband was the newly appointed auditor general.

In an advertisement on 29 November 1852, Vieusseux listed her profession as Portrait Painter, invited the public to visit her studio, see her work, done in oils, chalks and pencils, and announced "drawing and painting classes for young ladies who can enjoy the advantages of French conversation".

At the third Victorian Industrial Society Exhibition held in December 1852, Vieusseux was decorated with a gold medal, first class, for two portrait studies. They were her study of a girl (French School) and her copy of the Virgin Mary after Raphael, while her oil painting of a minstrel (German school) was said by the judges to have great merit, and was also awarded gold medal, first class.

In April 1853 she advertised an exhibition of her paintings at the Melbourne Mechanics Institute. At the end of the exhibition, the paintings were to be sold by Subscription Sale. She also exhibited her paintings at the Victorian Society of Fine Arts in 1857. She was also represented in the Intercolonial Exhibition of 1866.

Lewis had opened a civil engineering, architectural and surveying practice with a partner at 117 Swanston Street, Melbourne, in 1853, but it was not successful and was closed by June 1855.

=== Educator ===
Julie and Lewis may have taken inspiration from Julie's younger sister, Marie Sophie Matthieu, who in 1856 had taken over as principal of Beach House, St Kilda, a private school for girls.

In August 1857, Julie and Lewis Vieusseux founded the Vieusseux Ladies’ College, at 23 Victoria Parade, Collingwood, Melbourne. It catered for children above the age of six, junior and senior students. In addition, "Ladies desirous of attending any class in the Senior Division are at liberty to do so." The school swiftly became a highly fashionable establishment, where the upper classes enrolled their daughters. Julie and Lewis both taught fulltime – Julie taking French language and literature classes as well as Drawing and Painting classes; Lewis taking English language and literature, German language and literature, elocution, arithmetic, geography and history classes.

The Ladies' College was able to provide quality educational opportunities for girls and women which were already being provided by private schools established for boys and young men. By working as partners and co-directors of their school, Julie and Lewis quickly established their respected and successful reputation. They also offered public lectures, such as a series of ten lectures on Natural Science – Chemistry, Geology and Botany – by Dr John Macadam FRSSA, where "Ladies not members of the College can attend these Lectures. Cards of admission to the course, One Guinea, and syllabuses, can be obtained by application to the Principals."

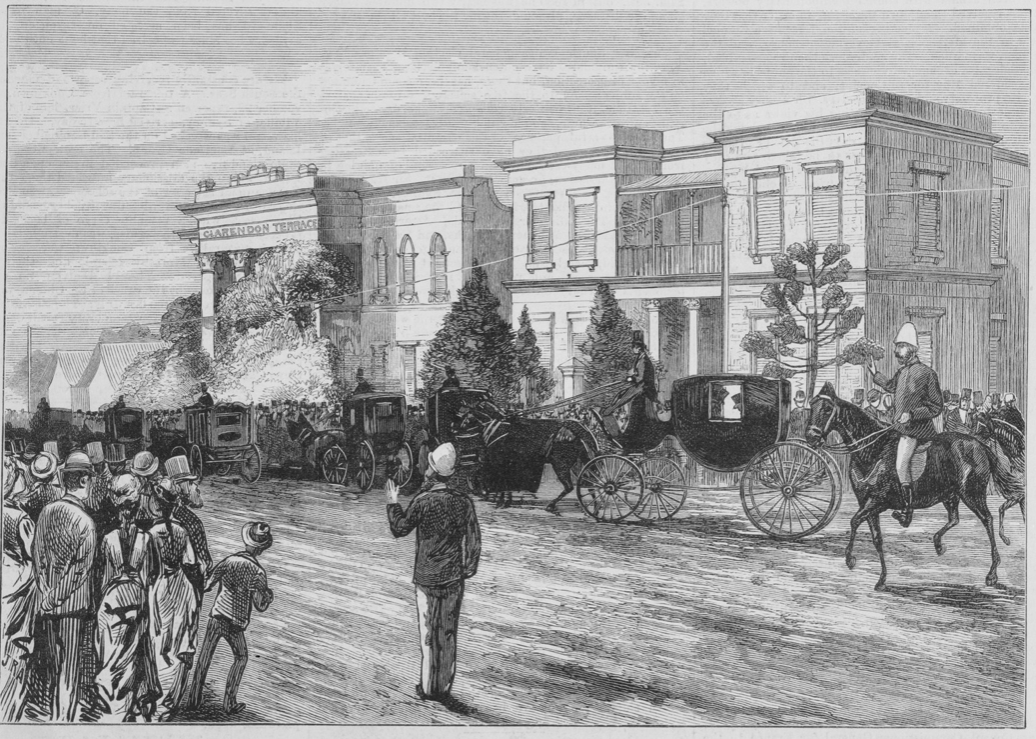
"Valletta" (right) which housed the Vieusseux Ladies' College between 1861 and 1882

From 1861 to 1865 Lewis and Julie Vieusseux leased "Valetta", at 206 Clarendon Street, East Melbourne, for the Ladies' College. In 1863, the school had 103 students, an unusually high number for a contemporary Australian school for girls. It was one of numerous schools that were a feature of the East Melbourne landscape. Julie and Lewis moved the Ladies’ College to other premises in Wilson Street, Brighton, in 1866.

Girls were not eligible to sit the matriculation and civil service exams until 1871. Passing still did not qualify them to enrol at Melbourne University. This did not happen until 1880. Nevertheless, advertisements for the school recorded that "Every year since 1872 inclusive, pupils of Ladies' College have passed the Matriculation and Civil Service Examinations at the Melbourne University".

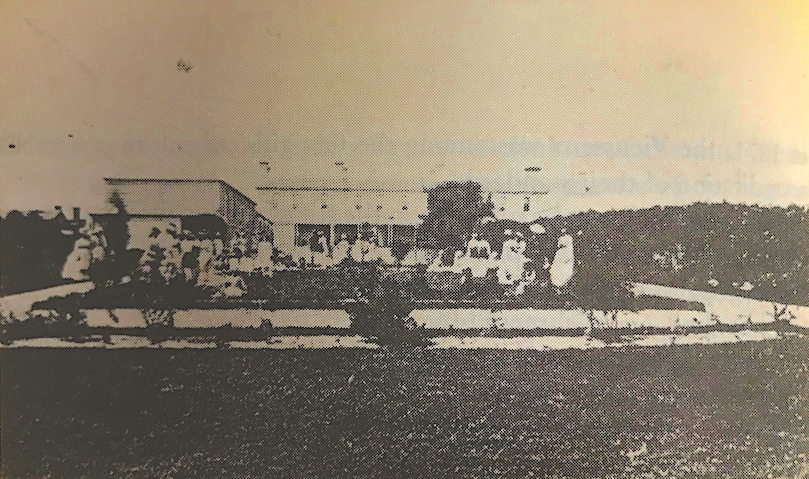
The back garden at Ladies' College, Clarendon St, East Melbourne

While the school was successful during Julie Vieusseux's lifetime, Lewis struggled to carry on after her death. Initially he and his son Edward and daughter-in-law Emily tried to maintain the school, which had moved back to Valetta.

When Lewis remarried in 1881, he tried to again run the school, with his new wife, Sarah Elizabeth Luke. But the popularity of Vieusseux Ladies’ College was ultimately replaced by that of the Presbyterian Ladies' College, and the Ladies' College closed four years after Julie's death.

Marjorie Theobald writes of the Vieusseux family archives which were held by Phyllis Vieusseux (Groube) Gray (1915–2004) of Melbourne, a granddaughter of Lewis Vieusseux and his second wife, Sarah Luke. They contained art works by Julie Vieusseux; photographs; newspaper clippings; the wedding portrait of Lewis and Julie Vieusseux, painted by Belgian artist Auguste Chauvin (1810–1884); a photograph of the back garden of the Ladies' College in Clarendon Street, East Melbourne; Ladies' College prospectuses; and registers of the Ladies' College from 1857 to 1882, listing 886 girls who were enrolled, offering "a profile of emerging power and privilege in the colony". Theobald states that they are "the most important source on the life and work of Julie Vieusseux".

Artist Emma Minnie Boyd had been one of Julie Vieusseux's students, as was Emma's older sister, Eliza a'Beckett. The school's "elegant, cultured and cosmopolitan principal set high standards in the teaching of art and French".

== Legacy ==
Julie and Lewis are buried in the Melbourne General Cemetery, Carlton North, Melbourne. The inscription on their gravestone reads:

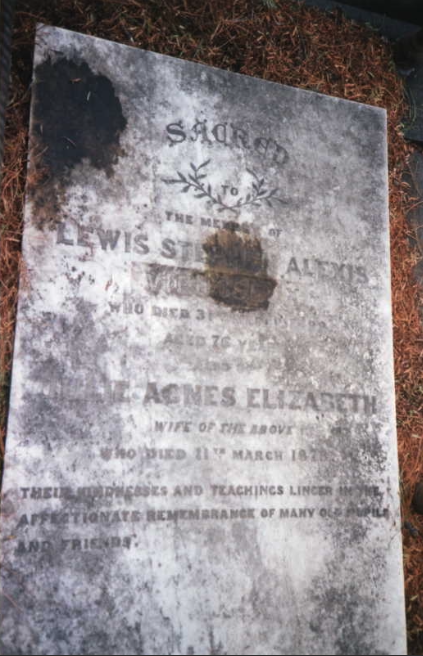
Gravestone of Lewis and Julie Vieussieux, Melbourne General Cemetery

Sacred to the memory of Lewis Stephen Alexis Vieusseux who died 31 March 1899, aged 76 years also of Julie Agnes Elizabeth wife of the above who died 11 March 1878. Their kindnesses and teachings linger in the affectionate remembrance of many old pupils and friends.

== Paintings ==
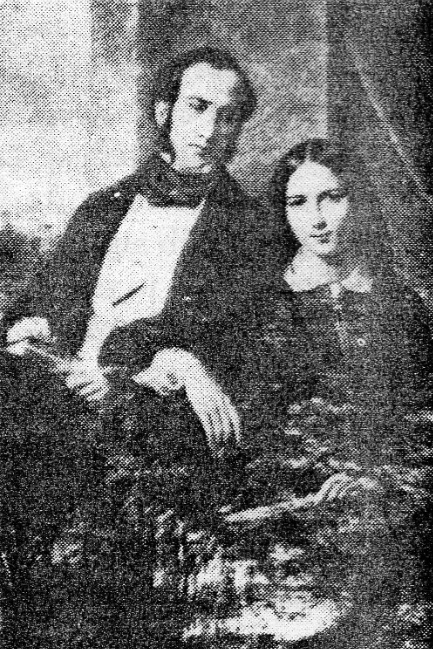
Lewis Vieusseux and Julie Matthieu, wedding portrait 1849 by Belgian artist, Auguste Chauvin (1810–1884)

The wedding portrait of Julie Matthieu and Lewis Vieusseux was in the possession of Mrs Phyllis Gray. It was painted 1849 by Auguste Chauvin (1810–1884). Born in Liege, Belgium, Chauvin taught art at the Academie Royale des Beaux-Arts de Liege from 1842, and was its director from 1855 to 1881. Julie Matthieu's parents lived in Liege in the 1840s. It is probable that she was living with them, and studied with Chauvin. She advertised that she painted "after the most approved styles", which were French, German and Flemish.

Maria Elizabeth O’Mullane and Her Children held in the National Gallery of Victoria has been attributed to both William Strutt, and also to Ludwig Becker, but this was contested in 1992 by Dr Joan Kerr. Kerr attributes the work to Julie Vieussieux "on stylistic as well as associational grounds", noting the mixed French and German qualities of a very competent unsigned and undated oil portrait; she also points to Maria O’Mullane being one of the referees listed in advertisements for the Vieussieux Ladies’ School.

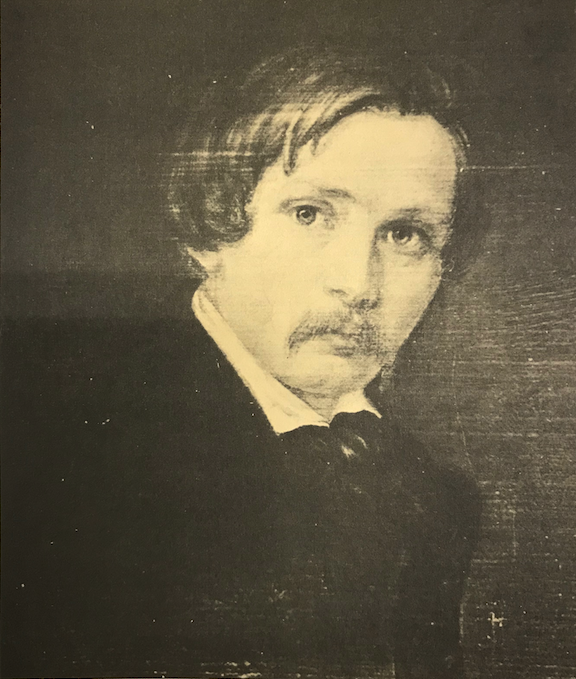
Eugene von Guerard. Oil portrait by Mme Vieusseaux, Melbourne c. 1860. Owned by Miss Mary Stuart, Melbourne

Marjorie Tipping uses a portrait of Eugene Gustave Guerard on the cover of her book of Von Guerard's Australian landscapes and reuses the image on the first page of the book, with the caption, "Oil portrait by Mme Vieusseux c. 1860. Owned by Miss Mary Stuart, Melbourne".

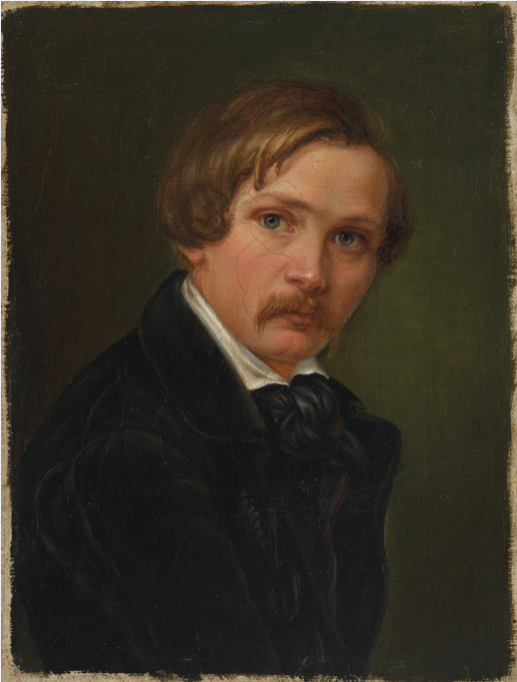
Eugene von Guerard. Oil portrait in National Gallery Victoria, Melbourne. Bequest of Mary Macrae Stewart 2009

The same painting is now held in the National Gallery Victoria, its provenance stated as the Bequest of Mary Macrae Stewart 2009. The inconsistency in the spelling of Stuart/Stewart needs clarification.

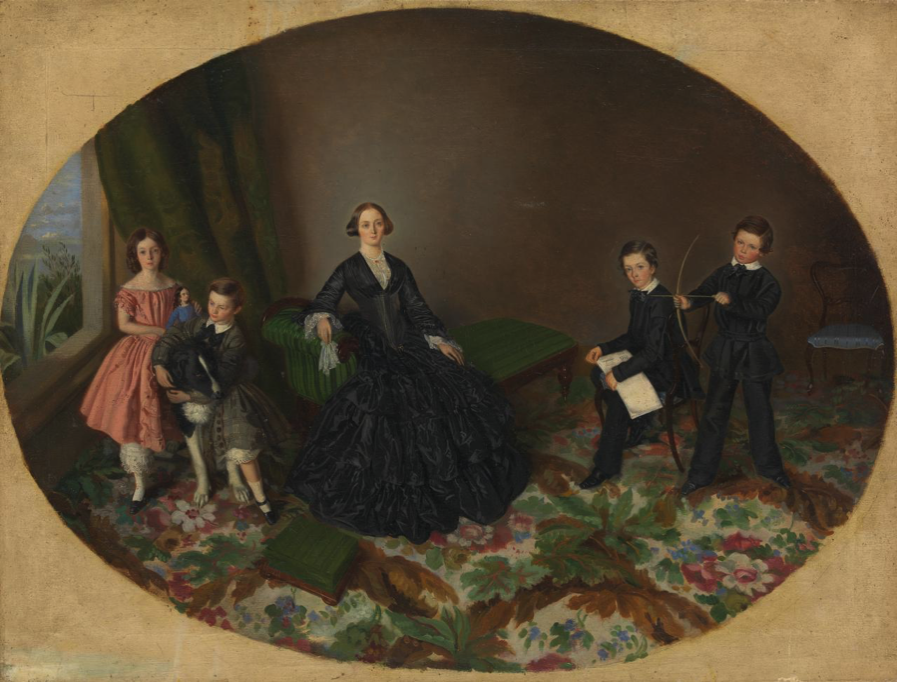
Maria Elizabeth O'Mullane and her children (c. 1854). Attributed by Dr Joan Kerr to Julie Vieusseux
