= William John Yuill =

William John Yuill (10 October 1885 – 5 October 1960) was an Australian agricultural writer, dairy industry leader and public servant. Yuill was born in Sebastian, Victoria and died in Parkville, Melbourne.
