= James Alexander Allan =

Australian poet and historian

James Alexander Allan (10 May 1879 – 22 January 1967) was an Australian poet and local historian.

Allan was born in Melbourne. He studied at Alfred Crescent State School, North Fitzroy and the Model School. Between 1912 and 1918 he worked as a Commonwealth public servant, and again from 1942 to 1950.

== Bibliography ==
- A Wineshop Madonna (1911; verse)
- The Old Model School (1934)
- Revolution (1940; verse)
- Men And Manners In Australia (1945)
- The History Of Camberwell (1949)
