= Charles Hardwick (antiquary) =

English antiquary

Charles Hardwick (10 September 1817 – 8 July 1889) was an English antiquary, known for his writings related to Lancashire.

== Life ==
The son of an innkeeper at Preston, Lancashire, he was born there on 10 September 1817. He was apprenticed to a printer, but on the expiration of his bond he devoted himself to art, and practised as a portrait-painter in Preston. Having joined the Odd Fellows he took part in the reform of the Manchester Unity, and was elected grand-master of the order.

Hardwick was a vice-president of the Manchester Literary Club, of which he was a founder. The original idea for the club, founded in 1862, has been attributed to Hardwick, Joseph Chattwood and Edwin Waugh.

Hardwick died at Manchester on 8 July 1889.

== Works ==
Hardwick's major works were:

- History of the borough of Preston and its Environs in the county of Lancaster, Preston, 1857
- The History, present position, and social importance of Friendly Societies, London, 1859 and 1869
- Traditions, Superstitions, and Folk-Lore (chiefly Lancashire and the North of England:) their affinity to others . . . their eastern origin and mythical significance, Manchester, 1872
- On some antient Battlefields in Lancashire and their historical, legendary, and aesthetic associations, Manchester, 1882

Hardwick also was editor of Country Words: a North of England Magazine of Literature, Science, and Art, 17 numbers, Manchester, 1866-67. Ben Brierley assisted him with the magazine.

== Notes ==
Attribution

This article incorporates text from a publication now in the public domain: Stephen, Leslie; Lee, Sidney, eds. (1890). "Hardwick, Charles (1817-1889)". Dictionary of National Biography. Vol. 24. London: Smith, Elder & Co.
