= Herb Byrne =

Australian rules footballer

- Born: 28 October 1887; Richmond, Victoria
- Died: 3 August 1959 (aged 71); Kew, Victoria
- Military career
- Allegiance: Australia
- Branch: Australian Imperial Force; Citizen Military Forces
- Service years: 1912–1927; 1940–1944
- Rank: Lieutenant Colonel
- Commands: 14th Field Regiment
- Conflicts: First World War; Second World War
- Awards: Distinguished Service Order; Colonial Auxiliary Forces Officers' Decoration; Mentioned in Despatches (2)
Australian rules football career
Personal information
- Original team: Xavier College
- Height: 180 cm (5 ft 11 in)
Playing career^{1}
Years	Club	Games (Goals)
1907	Fitzroy	2 (0)
- ^{1} Playing statistics correct to the end of 1907.

Herbert Richard Byrne, DSO, VD (28 October 1887 – 3 August 1959) was an Australian military officer and an Australian rules footballer who played with Fitzroy in the Victorian Football League (VFL).

== Family ==
The son of Richard Byrne (1860–1908) and Olivia Gertrude Byrne, née Keenan (1864–1931), Herbert Richard Byrne was born at Richmond in Victoria on 28 October 1887.

== Football ==
Having come to attention while playing for Xavier College, Byrne made two senior appearances for Fitzroy in the 1907 VFL season.

== Military service ==
Byrne had a long and distinguished career in the Australian Military Forces.

After enlisting to serve in the First World War, Byrne served on the Gallipoli peninsula and in Egypt as an officer. He was awarded the Distinguished Service Order in October 1917 for saving his men from a shell burst and then rescuing eight of those injured near Ypres in Belgium. Six days later, despite being wounded, he stayed with his men for two days before being ordered to leave to receive medical attention. He was Mentioned in Despatches twice.

After the war Byrne continued to serve as a part-time commissioned officer and was awarded the Colonial Auxiliary Forces Officers' Decoration for his long and meritorious service.

Byrne enlisted in the Second Australian Imperial Force while in Sydney in 1940, and served for a further four years from January 1940 with the rank of lieutenant colonel.
