= Charles Hardwicke =

British explorer (1788–1880)

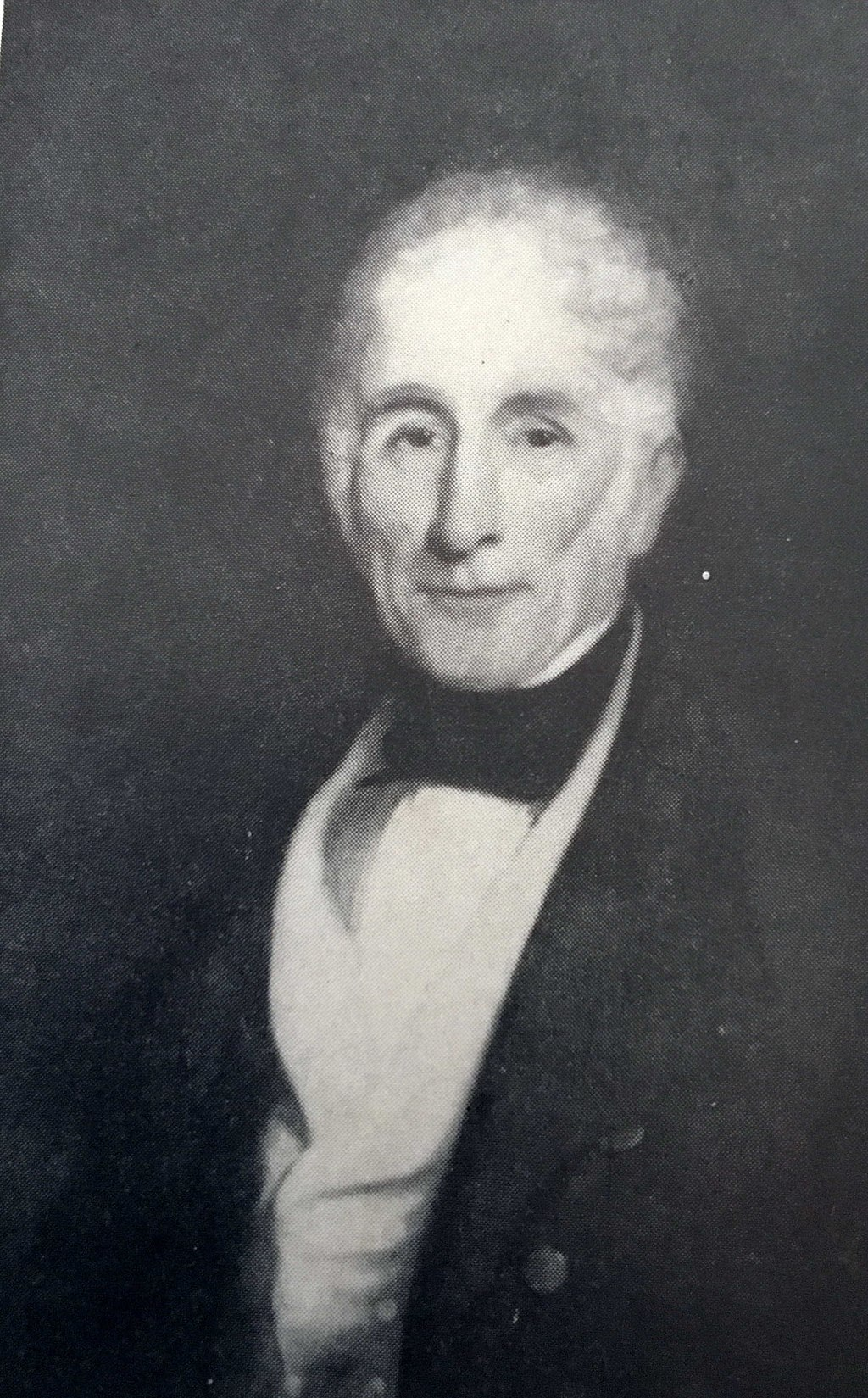
Charles Browne Hardwicke (1788 - 1880)

Captain Charles Browne Hardwicke (1788–1880) was an English explorer, later a farmer. He was born in Market Deeping, Lincolnshire. He settled in Launceston, Tasmania in 1816. He is best known for his claim that Tasmania's north-west coast was "quite impenetrable and totally uninhabitable".

== Biography ==
Charles Browne Hardwicke was the eldest child of Charles and Frances (née Browne) Hardwicke and was born on 2 August 1788 at Market Deeping, south Lincolnshire. The family had lived within the county since the middle of the sixteenth century.

From his mother's side, Charles was the great-grandson of Laurence Shirley, 4th Earl Ferrers and his mistress Margaret Clifford.

His father (also Charles) was the youngest son in a large middle-class family of thirteen children. He was a surgeon in Market Deeping. Many of his siblings were educated or married into medical, clerical, legal and military professions.

In December 1803, aged 15, Charles Browne Hardwicke, began his naval life when he was consigned to a merchant ship trading in the West Indies. At nineteen he received a commission for the Royal Navy; at the time England was fighting the Napoleonic wars. At 25 in 1813 he left the Royal Navy and was appointed as third officer on the convict transport ship the General Hewitt, bound for Sydney.

Shortly after his arrival in Sydney in February 1814 he wrote to Governor Lachlan Macquarie to request permission to stay in the colony. When permission was given he was also granted 200 acres of land at Norfolk Plains (near Launceston) in Van Diemen's Land to encourage free settlers to the area to establish farms. In 1819 he was granted a further 500 acres by Macquarie for the capture of escaped convicts. Between the years of 1814 to 1829 Hardwicke received over 3,000 acres in land grants for services in capturing escaped convicts and bushrangers.

By 1823 the population to the island had rapidly increased and Lieutenant-Governor Sorell commissioned Hardwicke to conduct a tour of discovery of the north-west where he reported that the country was "quite impenetrable and totally uninhabitable". He offered to explore eastward which he hoped would be more successful.

Charles Browne Hardwicke married Elizabeth Chapman (Harris) at Church of St. John, Launceston on 18 January 1820. They had fourteen children[2]. Elizabeth Chapman (Harris) was the eldest daughter of Sarah Chapman who was a convict who arrived in Australia on the convict ship The Nile in 1801 and John Harris (Australian settler) and military surgeon.
