= Frederick Weld =

New Zealand politician and colonial administrator (1823–1891)

The Honourable Sir Frederick Weld GCMG
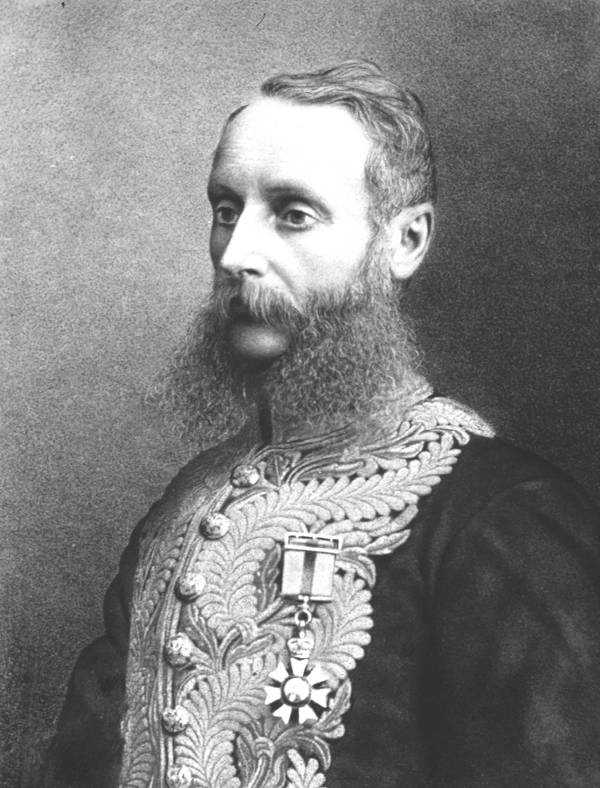
- Sir Frederick Weld, date unknown

6th Premier of New Zealand
- In office 24 November 1864 – 16 October 1865
- Monarch: Victoria
- Governor: George Grey
- Preceded by: Frederick Whitaker
- Succeeded by: Edward Stafford
- Constituency: Wairau, Cheviot

8th Governor of Western Australia
- In office 30 September 1869 – 13 January 1875
- Monarch: Victoria
- Preceded by: Benjamin Pine
- Succeeded by: William C. F. Robinson

4th Governor of Tasmania
- In office 13 January 1875 – 5 April 1880
- Monarch: Victoria
- Preceded by: Charles Du Cane
- Succeeded by: George Strahan

12th Governor of the Straits Settlements
- In office 16 May 1880 – 17 October 1887
- Monarch: Queen Victoria
- Colonial Secretary: James W. W. Birch; Thomas Braddell
- Preceded by: William C. F. Robinson
- Succeeded by: Cecil Clementi Smith

Personal details
- Born: 9 May 1823 Bridport, Dorset, England
- Died: 20 July 1891 (aged 68) Chideock, Dorset, England
- Party: None
- Spouse: Filumena Mary Anne Lisle Phillipps (m. 1859)
- Children: 13
- Parent(s): Humphrey Weld; Christina Maria Clifford
- Education: Stonyhurst College
- Alma mater: University of Fribourg
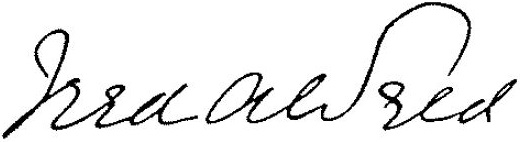
- Signature

Sir Frederick Aloysius Weld GCMG (9 May 1823 – 20 July 1891), was an English-born New Zealand politician and colonial administrator of various British colonies and territories located in Oceania and Southeast Asia. He was the sixth Prime Minister of New Zealand, and later served as Governor of Western Australia, Governor of Tasmania, and Governor of the Straits Settlements.

== Early life ==
Weld was born near Bridport, Dorset, England, on 9 May 1823. His mother, Christina Maria Clifford, was the daughter of Baron Clifford of Chudleigh. Both of his parents were from old recusant Catholic families.

His father, Humphrey Weld of Chideock, was a member of the Weld family. Humphrey's father Thomas Weld (of Lulworth) donated the land and endowed the Jesuit college at Stonyhurst. Weld's upbringing was strongly grounded in the Roman Catholic faith. His early years were spent with his parents in the Restored Kingdom of France. Later, he received a good education, studying at Stonyhurst before attending a predecessor of the University of Fribourg in Switzerland, where he studied philosophy, chemistry, European languages, and law. He had originally intended to pursue a military career, but was convinced otherwise by his tutor at Fribourg. He instead decided to seek a career in the British colonies, and arrived in Wellington, Colony of New Zealand, on 22 April 1844.

In the Colony of New Zealand, he entered a partnership with his cousin, Charles Clifford. The two established a number of sheep stations around the country, and Weld became relatively prosperous. Weld found a life of agricultural management to be too mundane, however, and soon became active in political concerns. One of his more significant campaigns was to ward against any potential discrimination against Roman Catholics in New Zealand. He later became active in lobbying for representative government in New Zealand.

In the 1850s, Weld undertook a series of expeditions on behalf of the Nelson Provincial Government to identify an inland route between the Nelson and Canterbury provinces.

== Member of Parliament ==
New Zealand Parliament
Years	Term	Electorate	Party
1853–1855	1st	Wairau	Independent
1858–1860	2nd	Wairau	Independent
1861–1866	3rd	Cheviot	Independent

When the creation of the New Zealand Parliament was announced, Weld stood for election. He became a member of the 1st Parliament as the representative of Wairau, an electorate in the northeast of the South Island; he was declared elected unopposed. The main political division of the day was between "centralists" (favouring a strong central government) and "provincialists" (favouring strong regional governments). On this spectrum, Weld established himself as a moderate centralist, although he tended to oppose the extremes of either side.

Weld was also a member of the brief "cabinet" formed around James FitzGerald. This represented an attempt by Parliament to assume direct responsibility for administering New Zealand. Acting Governor Robert Wynyard managed to block this move, however, and Weld's role as a "minister" came to an end. Despite the failure of the FitzGerald "cabinet", Weld was pleased that Catholics were able to participate fully in politics. The fact that Charles Clifford, also a Catholic, had become Speaker was also encouraging to him.

Weld resigned from Parliament in June 1855, a short while before the end of its first term, returning to England for a brief time. When he returned, he was elected to the 2nd Parliament in a by-election, again representing Wairau. He briefly returned to England again in late 1858 to marry his second cousin, Filumena Mary Anne Lisle Phillipps, daughter of Ambrose Lisle March Phillipps De Lisle and a great grandchild of the 4th Baron Clifford of Chudleigh like Weld, with whom he would have thirteen children.

=== Cabinet minister ===
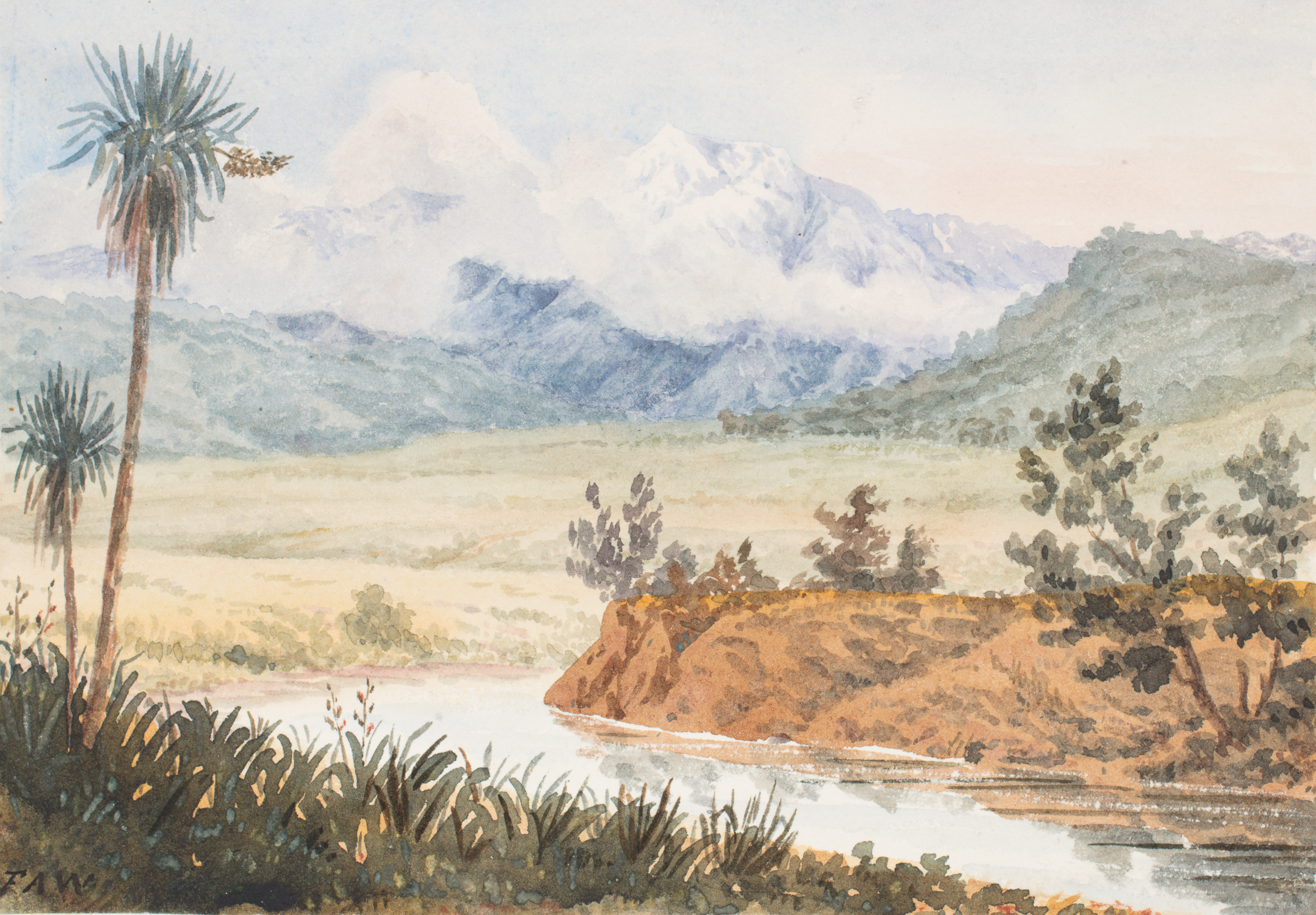
View in the Middle Island, N.Z., an 1861 watercolour by Weld

In 1860, Weld was invited to join Edward Stafford's government, taking over responsibility for Native Affairs from William Richmond. In this role, Weld had to contend with conflicts such as the First Taranaki War. Although Weld disliked the prospect of war, and believed that Governor George Grey had mishandled the situation, he believed strongly in the need to assert the power of the government, describing it as a "painful duty". He unexpectedly lost the 1861 election in Wairau against William Henry Eyes, but due to the staggered election dates successfully stood in the neighbouring Cheviot electorate a fortnight later, where he defeated Charles Hunter Brown. Weld lost his ministerial position when the Stafford administration was defeated.

In 1864, the government of Frederick Whitaker resigned due to disputes with the Governor. The point in question was who should bear responsibility for funding British troops stationed in New Zealand. Weld, believing that it was British ineptitude that caused conflict with the Māori in the first place, strongly objected to Grey's demands that Parliament should fund the troops. Weld instead believed that British troops should be removed from New Zealand altogether, and be replaced by local forces.

=== Premier of New Zealand ===
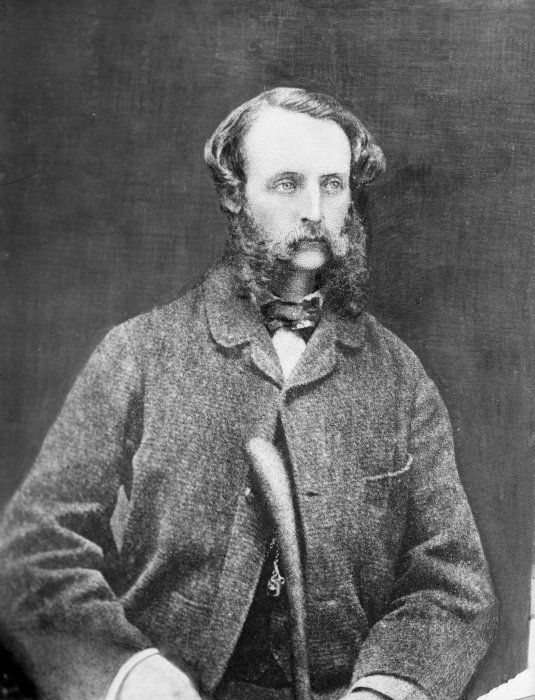
Sir Frederick Aloysius Weld, ca 1865

As Premier, Weld met with mixed success. In 1865 the capital was moved to Wellington, and his proposals for Māori relations were adopted. These two things generated considerable bitterness, however – Aucklanders were angry about the change of capital, and Māori were angry about the confiscation of over a million acres (4,000 km^{2}) of land in the Waikato area. Weld's other success, the withdrawal of British troops from New Zealand, was also controversial, and generated considerable hostility from the Governor. In addition, the government's financial situation was precarious. A little less than a year after taking office, Weld's government resigned.

== Colonial governorships ==
Weld, suffering from poor health and stress, retired from politics in 1866, and returned to England the following year. However his health improved, and he began working again. In 1869 he published Notes on New Zealand Affairs, and in March of the same year he began a career as a British colonial governor with an appointment to the post of Governor of Western Australia.

=== Governor of Western Australia ===
Weld arrived in Western Australia in September, 1869. He immediately embarked on a series of tours of the state, which saw him travel about 1,200 miles (1,900 km) on horseback in his first six months in office. Impressed by the state's isolation, he urged the establishment of telegraph lines and improvements to transportation. In March, 1870, he sent John Forrest to explore and survey a possible route for a telegraph line between Albany and Adelaide. This was later built, and by 1874, the state had more than 900 miles (1400 km) of operational telegraph line. Weld also oversaw the establishment of a steamship service along the coast, and the beginnings of a rail system.

Weld saw his appointment to the governorship as a mandate to institute similar constitutional changes to that achieved in New Zealand. With the enthusiastic support of his Colonial Secretary Frederick Barlee, he set about promoting representative government. At the first opportunity, Weld introduced a Bill which provided for the election of 12 Members of the Legislative Council, to sit with six official and nominee members. The Bill was eventually passed on 1 June 1870. Barlee then began agitating for responsible government, and in 1874 the Legislative Council passed a resolution calling for it. Although Weld did not think that Western Australia was ready for responsible government, he accepted the situation and passed on the request to the Colonial Office in London. The Colonial Office were strongly against granting responsible government, and were critical of Weld for allowing the situation to arise. In 1874, Weld went on leave to New Zealand to look after his partnership affairs. He is said to have remarked, upon his departure, "At last she moves", in reference to the improvements he perceived in Western Australia. On this return, he was transferred to the post of Governor of Tasmania, and the issue of responsible government was dropped until 1890.

=== Other colonial governorships ===
Weld was Governor of Tasmania from 1875 to 1880. He found the role much less taxing than in Western Australia, as Tasmania already had responsible government and his main duty was to preside at meetings of the Executive Council. From 1880 to 1887, he was Governor of the Straits Settlements, consisting of Malacca, Penang, and Singapore. Louch (1966) writes of Weld's seven years in Singapore: "It was there with his wealth of experience that he found the fullest scope for his talents as a colonial administrator, and where he is best remembered now." He was appointed Companion of the Order of St Michael and St George (CMG) in 1875, promoted to Knight Commander of the order (KCMG) in the 1880 Birthday Honours, and promoted again to Knight Grand Cross (GCMG) in the 1885 Birthday Honours.

He was a devout Catholic all his life, and the Pope made him a knight of the Order of Pius IX.

== Governor of the Straits Settlements ==
=== Malay States Administration ===
In 1880, Sir Frederick Weld arrived in the Straits Settlements. He began to take personal interest in the development of the Malay States. In the middle of 1881, Weld visited the town of Taiping, in Perak. He found "the revenue increasing and everything going on excellent well..." but "labour for public works and roads and to develop other industries and sources of revenue besides tin-mining," he lamented, "is the great want". he also reported that:

"Water supply for Taiping from the hill (Maxwell Hill), the roads to Krian, which will connect Taiping town centre with Province Wellesley, and a rail and tramway from Taiping to the port (Port Weld, which was named after him) are amongst the next most necessary works to be undertaken. the town of Taiping has been much improved since the fire, which took place rather more than a year ago; new streets have been laid out to considerable width, and a better class of houses has been built"

The construction of the Taiping – Port Weld railway was the beginning of a major transformation altering radically the landscape of the Malay Peninsula. It also brought the first influx of Indians (mainly Tamils) and Ceylonese to Perak. Sir Frederick Weld was in Taiping again in 1883 where he "inspected everything". He spent time going down the Port Weld railway line, then in the course of construction, "on a truck behind the Engine". He also put into effect plans to build a telegraph line along the road linking Taiping with Province Wellesley. It was nearing completion after which a railway along the same route would be constructed.

== Later life ==
Weld finally retired from political life in 1887, although he remained active in other fields of work. In 1891, visiting the Straits Settlements once again, he contracted a serious illness, and returned to England. He died in Chideock on 20 July 1891.

== Places named after Weld ==
- Port Weld in Perak, also known in Malay as Kuala Sepetang.
- Weld Road in Kuala Lumpur was named in 1960. In 1982 it was renamed Jalan Raja Chulan after Raja Chulan, but a 1980s shopping complex on that road retains the name "The Weld".
- Weld Hill in Kuala Lumpur, subsequently renamed Bukit Mahkamah. It is now the site of Menara Maybank.
- Weld Road and Upper Weld Road in Singapore and Weld Quay in George Town, Penang.
- Weld Road in Swan View, a suburb of Perth, Western Australia.
- Weld Springs, Weld Range and Mount Weld in Western Australia, all named by explorer John Forrest.
- The Weld River in southwest Western Australia.
- The Weld Club and Weld Square in Perth.
- Weld Street in Hobart, Tasmania.
- Weld Valley and Weld River in Tasmania.
- Weldborough, a locality in north-east Tasmania.
- Weld Cone near Ward, South Island, New Zealand.
- Weld Street in Martinborough, New Zealand, North Island, New Zealand.
- Weld Street in Wadestown, Wellington, New Zealand
- Upper Weld Road in Singapore
- Weld Road in Singapore

Government offices
Preceded by Frederick Whitaker	Premier of New Zealand; 1864–1865	Succeeded by Edward Stafford
Preceded by Sir Benjamin Pine	Governor of Western Australia; 1869–1875	Succeeded by Sir William Robinson
Preceded by Charles Du Cane	Governor of Tasmania; 1875–1880	Succeeded by Major Sir George Strahan
Preceded by Sir William Robinson	Governor of the Straits Settlements; 1880–1887	Succeeded by Cecil Clementi Smith
New Zealand Parliament
New constituency	Member of Parliament for Wairau; 1853–1855; 1858–1860	Succeeded by William Wells
Preceded by William Wells	Member of Parliament for Wairau; 1853–1855; 1858–1860	Succeeded by William Henry Eyes
Preceded by Edward Jollie	Member of Parliament for Cheviot; 1861–1866	Succeeded by David Monro
