= Federal Council of Australasia =

Intergovernmental colonial body, 1885–1900

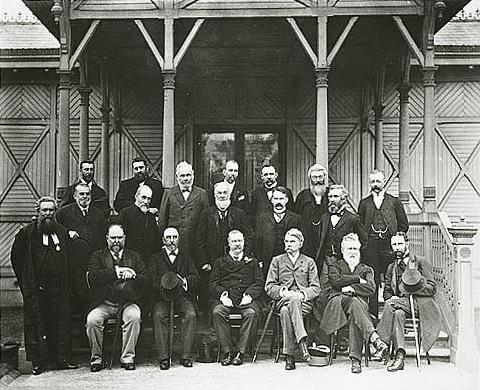
- Final meeting of the Council in 1899

Overview
- Established: 14 August 1885
- Dissolved: 9 July 1900
- Appointed by: Colony of Queensland; Colony of Tasmania (Victoria (state)) Colony of Victoria; Colony of Fiji; Colony of South Australia (Note: The Colony of South Australia participated in the Council between 1888 and 1890); Colony of Western Australia

The Federal Council of Australasia was an intergovernmental body with representatives from six British colonies in Oceania. The first official meeting of the Council took place in Hobart, Tasmania in 1885. It was repealed following the federation of Australia in 1901.

The final (and successful) push for the Federal Council came at a "Convention" on 28 November 1883, which met in Sydney, and at which the six Australian colonies, New Zealand and Fiji were represented. The conference was called to debate the strategies needed to counter the activities of the German and French in New Guinea and in New Hebrides.

Federal Council of Australasia Act 1885 (Note: Section 32.)
- Act of Parliament
- Parliament of the United Kingdom
- Long title: An Act to constitute a Federal Council of Australasia.
- Citation: 48 & 49 Vict. c. 60
- Territorial extent: United Kingdom

Dates
- Royal assent: 14 August 1885
- Commencement: 14 August 1885 (Note: Section 30. The Acts of Parliament (Commencement) Act 1793.)
- Repealed: 9 July 1900
Other legislation
Repealed by	Commonwealth of Australia Constitution Act 1900

Status: Repealed

Text of statute as originally enacted

Sir Samuel Griffith, the Premier of Queensland, drafted a bill to constitute the Federal Council. The Federal Council was a limited legislative body. It had powers to legislate directly upon certain matters, such as in relation to extradition, regulation of fisheries, patents of invention and discovery and copyright, and so on, but it did not have a permanent secretariat, executive powers, or any revenue of its own. The representatives considered that the formation of the council was a constitutional change that required an act of the British Parliament. In July and August, 1884, the legislatures of Victoria, Tasmania, Queensland, Western Australia, and Fiji petitioned the Imperial Parliament to enact the bill. The bill became law on 14 August 1885 as the Federal Council of Australasia Act 1885 (48 & 49 Vict. c. 60), and gave any Australasian colony power to join or withdraw from the council.

The first assembly of the Federal Council took place on 25 January 1886 in Hobart, Tasmania, and consisted of representatives of the self-governing colonies of Queensland, Tasmania and Victoria, and the Crown Colonies of Western Australia and Fiji were involved. New South Wales and New Zealand did not join the Federal Council. South Australia was briefly a member between 1888 and 1890. The Federal Council met eight times between 1886 and 1899, to discuss matters of importance and common interest. It had no power to enforce its decisions beyond that provided by the member colonies. Furthermore, the absence of the powerful colony of New South Wales weakened its representative value.

Robert Hamilton from Tasmania presided over the Federal Council meetings held in Hobart in 1887, 1888, and 1889. Adye Douglas, Premier of Tasmania from 1884 to 1886, represented Tasmania on the Federal Council. Thomas Joseph Byrnes represented Queensland at meetings of the Federal Council in 1895 and 1897. He became Premier of Queensland in 1898 and died in the same year. Robert Frederick Sholl, a member of the Parliament of Western Australia, was also a representative at the Australasian Federal Convention of 1897. Sir Alexander Matheson, 3rd Baronet, member of the Western Australian Legislative Council from 1897 to 1901, was also a member of the Federal Council from 1897 to 1900.

The Federal Council was abolished by the Commonwealth of Australia Constitution Act 1900, section 7. The final meeting of the Federal Council had taken place in January 1899.

== Legislation ==
- An Act to Constitute a Federal Council of Australasia | Parliament of the United Kingdom, 1885
- The Federal Council (Adopting) Act | Parliament of Western Australia, 1885
- The Federal Council Adopting Act | Parliament of South Australia, 1888

== See also ==
- List of acts of the Federal Council of Australasia
- Council of Australian Governments
