= George Strahan (colonial administrator) =

British military officer and colonial administrator (1838–1887)

Major Sir George Strahan GCMG
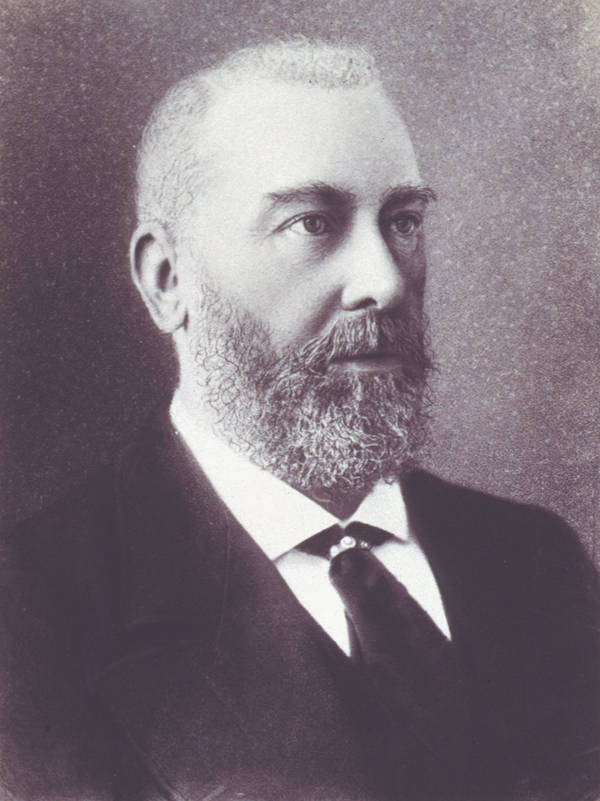

67th Governor of the Gold Coast Colony
- In office June 1874 – 7 April 1876
- Monarch: Victoria
- Preceded by: Charles Lees
- Succeeded by: Charles Lees

14th Governor of Barbados and the Windward Islands
- In office 1876–1880
- Monarch: Victoria
- Preceded by: Sir John Pope Hennessy
- Succeeded by: D.J. Gamble

5th Governor of Tasmania
- In office 7 December 1881 – 28 October 1886
- Monarch: Victoria
- Preceded by: Frederick Weld
- Succeeded by: Robert George Crookshank Hamilton

Personal details
- Born: 9 December 1838 Fraserburgh, Aberdeenshire, Scotland, United Kingdom
- Died: 17 February 1887 (aged 48) Bournemouth, Dorset, England, United Kingdom
- Spouse: Catherine Livingstone
- Education: Royal Military Academy, Woolwich

Military service
- Allegiance: United Kingdom
- Branch/service: British Army
- Years of service: 1857–
- Rank: Major
- Unit: Royal Artillery

Major Sir George Cumine Strahan GCMG (9 December 1838 – 17 February 1887) was a British military officer and colonial administrator, best known as the Governor of Tasmania from 1881 to 1886.

== Early life and military career ==
Strahan was born on 9 December 1838 in Fraserburgh, Aberdeenshire, Scotland, in the United Kingdom. After graduating from the Royal Military Academy, Woolwich, he joined the Royal Artillery corps of the British Army as a lieutenant in 1857.

== Colonial career ==
Strahan was assigned as aide-de-camp to the last two Lord High Commissioners of the Ionian Islands: William Ewart Gladstone (actually High Commissioner Extraordinary, later to become Prime Minister) and Sir Henry Storks. When Storks was appointed Governor of Malta in 1864, Strahan accompanied him and served his successor, Sir Patrick Grant, until 1868 when he was made chief secretary of Malta. Further administrative appointments in various capacities followed in the Bahamas (colonial secretary 1868–1872, acting governor 1872–1873), Lagos Colony (administrator 1873–1874), Gold Coast (governor 1874–1876) and the Windward Islands/Barbados (governor 1876–1880).

== Governor of Tasmania ==
Strahan was appointed Governor of Tasmania in April 1880, and was knighted shortly after. He did not, however, take up the appointment until arriving in Hobart in December 1881. The long delay was caused by Strahan acting as administrator of the Cape Colony and high commissioner to Southern Africa until the arrival of Sir Hercules Robinson.

Strahan was a popular governor in Tasmania, regarded as attentive to education, health and rural industry. His own health was occasionally questioned, and the spells of illness he suffered during his term were put down to having spent so many years in the tropical climates of the Caribbean and Africa.

Strahan left Tasmania in October 1886, and returned to England via Melbourne. On 29 January 1887 he was appointed Knight Grand Cross of the Order of St Michael and St George. He was appointed as Governor of Hong Kong to replace Sir George Bowen, but died in Bournemouth on 17 February 1887 before he could take up the appointment.

== Legacy ==
The town of Strahan on the West Coast of Tasmania was named after George Strahan in 1892.
Strahan Street in North Hobart was built by local landowner, Alfred Winter in late 1885 and sold to the Council on the premise that they would maintain it, originally intended to be known as Winter Street, the Hobart City Council named it after George Strahan, the then Governor of Tasmania in 1886.

Government offices
Preceded by Sir James Walker	Governor of the Bahamas; 1871–1873	Succeeded by Sir John Pope Hennessy
Preceded by Charles Lees, acting	Governor of the Gold Coast; 1874–1876	Succeeded by Charles Lees, acting
Preceded by Sir John Pope Hennessy	Governor of Barbados and the Windward Islands; 1876–1880	Succeeded by D.J. Gamble (acting)
Preceded by Sir Frederick Weld	Governor of Tasmania; 1881–1886	Succeeded by Sir Robert Hamilton
