= Molly Morgan =

Convict transported to Australia, landowner, and farmer

- Born: Mary Jones; 1762; Ludlow, Shropshire, England
- Died: 27 June 1835 (aged 72–73); Greta, New South Wales, Australia
- Other names: Molly Mears; Molly Hunt; Molly Jones
- Occupations: Landowner; farmer; convict

Molly Morgan (baptised 31 January 1762 (Note: Although most sources, including the Australian Dictionary of Biography, say that she was born in 1762, the Maitland Mercury claims that her birth year was 1760 instead, making her 75 years old when she died.) – 27 June 1835) was an English landowner, farmer, and convict. She was born as Mary Jones in Ludlow, Shropshire, England, and stayed there throughout her childhood and early adulthood, marrying William Morgan on 25 June 1785 and having two children with him. In 1789, hempen yarn stolen from a factory was discovered at the Morgans' house, resulting in the couple being sentenced to penal transportation. Although William was able to escape initially, Molly was transported to New South Wales as a convict with the Second Fleet on the Neptune, and William was eventually caught and transported as well. After working together for a while in Australia, William left Molly due to her flirting with other men. In 1794, Molly Morgan was able to escape back to England aboard the Resolution by becoming Captain John Locke's mistress. Once back in England, she recovered her children and became a dressmaker in Plymouth, marrying Thomas Mears in 1797. However, she was transported back to Australia on the Experiment, after she was accused of burning her husband's house down in 1803. (Note: Some sources believe that Morgan burnt the house down after an argument between the two, while others say that it was burnt down for an unknown reason and Mears falsely accused Morgan of the crime.)

When Morgan returned to Australia, she acquired land and cattle. In 1814, she was sentenced to seven years in jail for milking a stolen cow. However, by 1819, she was trusted enough to be one of the twelve convicts given several acres of land to farm at Wallis Plains (now Maitland), and was set free by 1822. She married Thomas Hunt on 5 March 1822. She started a wine shanty on the land she was given at Wallis Plains and received a grant of additional land by the governor, Thomas Brisbane, where she built the Angel Inn. By 1828, she was described as "one of the largest landholders on the Hunter River" and had several features in New South Wales named after her. Morgan also aided other settlers several times, including donating money to help build a school, turning part of her home into a hospital, and riding to Sydney on behalf of convicts. Her wealth significantly decreased throughout the later years of her life and she died on 27 June 1835, at Anvil Creek in Greta, New South Wales, where she owned 203 acres (82 ha) of land.

== Early life ==
Morgan was born as Mary Jones in 1762, in Ludlow, Shropshire, England, and was baptised in the village of Diddlebury, on 31 January 1762. She was the child of David Jones, an English general labourer and ratcatcher, and Margaret Jones, born Powell. As a child, she briefly received education and later became a dressmaker. She called herself "Molly" from childhood and became known as that for the rest of her life. Her first child was with a farmer who would not marry Molly. Her first husband was William Morgan, whom she married on 25 June 1785, when she was 22 years old William was from the village of Hopesay in Shropshire and was working as a carpenter and wheelwright. The couple had two children.

== Sentencing and convict life ==
=== First sentence and escape ===
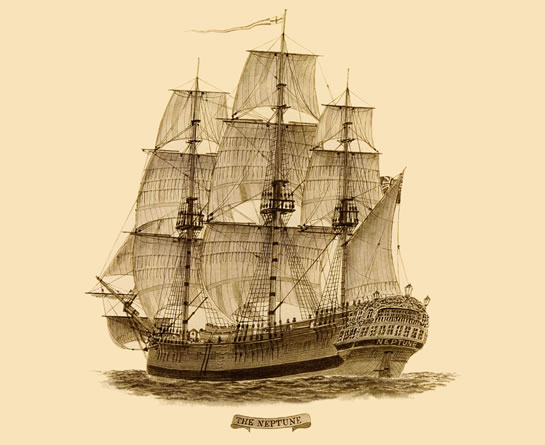
A drawing of the Neptune, the ship Morgan was transported on.

In 1788, Molly Morgan stole hempen yarn, due to her family struggling at the time, which resulted in her being arrested along with her husband. A bleaching factory located near the Morgans' house was reported to have a few shillings of hempen yarn missing, and it was discovered to be hidden at their house. While her husband, with the help of some of his soldier friends, was able to escape jail and run away, Molly was tried at Shrewsbury Assizes and found guilty on 8 August 1789, which caused her to attempt suicide. Her trial was used as an example of what would happen if other thieves performed a similar action as Morgan, a "special case".

Morgan was sentenced to seven years of penal transportation, being forced to sail to Australia with the Second Fleet on the hell ship Neptune in 1790; Morgan's children remained in England. Of the 502 convicts on the ship, 164 of them died during the voyage, mostly from starvation and neglect, and almost half of the total group of convicts died either on the ship or shortly after arriving at shore. During that time, ship owners would receive money for every convict they transported and if a convict died they would not have to spend money to feed them, essentially meaning that the more convicts that were on the ship but died during the voyage, the more money the ship owner would make. However, by using her "good looks" and swapping favours with the officers of the ship during the voyage, she received better treatment than the other convicts, including gaining extra rations and special privileges, as well as not having to endure the harsh treatment the rest of the convicts received. Due to this, Morgan was still in decent condition after the voyage. Shortly after arriving at Botany Bay in Sydney, New South Wales, on 28 June 1790, Morgan was sent to Parramatta and later essentially became a free agent. Three years later, William was caught again and this time was deported to Australia; he arrived at Australia in a group of prisoners who had been transported for thievery. Molly received permission to join him after his arrival. They both worked in Sydney, William on labour gangs and Molly in a factory. As a result of her good behaviour, Molly soon received a ticket of leave, allowing the couple to start a small shop.

Due to Molly's persistent flirting with men, William eventually left her following several arguments between the two. Morgan decided to try to escape the colony in New South Wales, so that she could go to the two children of her and William, who were still in England with no parent caring for them. She became the mistress of Captain John Locke, allowing her to join him on the Resolution, a store ship which was heading towards England, on 9 November 1794, along with thirteen other convicts who had not finished their transportation sentences. Along the way, Locke proposed to her, but she declined. After Morgan's escape, various theories were formed by the people in the colony as to what had happened to her. Upon arrival in England, Morgan was able to recover her children. She became a dressmaker in Plymouth, Devon, working to provide for her children. In 1797, Morgan married Thomas Mears, also spelt Meares, Meyers, or Mares, a rich brassfounder and bellringer, while she was still legally married to William. By this time, William had a new partner and family.

=== Second sentence and land grant ===
In 1803, Mears' house burned down, and Morgan was found guilty of this incident after a trial on 10 October 1803 at Croydon Sessions. Although she escaped to nearby London, she was eventually arrested; for her sentence, she was sent back to Australia a second time for seven years of penal transportation, this time on the Experiment, arriving on 24 June 1804 at Port Jackson. The convicts transported on the ship included 136 females, of which 6 died while on the ship, and 2 males, significantly fewer than the previous voyage on the Neptune. Upon arrival, Morgan was not able to locate William in Sydney. She was given several protectors, including Thomas Byrne, and acquired land and cattle at Parramatta a few years afterwards. In 1814, she was sentenced to jail for seven years in Newcastle Penal Colony for milking a stolen cow. However, the man who actually stole the cow was sentenced to only three years in jail.

In 1819, five years after she was jailed, (Note: Some sources say this occurred in 1818, making it four years after being put in jail.) Lachlan Macquarie, the governor of New South Wales, trusted Morgan enough to give her a ticket of leave, along with eleven other convicts who he thought were behaving well. These twelve convicts were granted 20–30 acres (8.1–12.1 ha) of land in West Maitland, in an area which became known as Wallis Plains, located along Wallis Creek and the Hunter River. These convicts could use this land to farm, in a "trial project to see if criminals could better themselves". Morgan had received a farm in her own right, being the only female convict in the group to do so. By 1822, Morgan was granted freedom.

== Life in Australia ==
Morgan established a settlement in the land she was given at Wallis Plains and became a successful farmer in the area, also starting a wine shanty there. Her third husband was Thomas Hunt, a soldier 30 years younger than herself, who was positioned as an army officer at the garrison in the area. They were married on 5 March 1822. By this time, Thomas Brisbane was the governor of New South Wales. Impressed by Morgan's farming skills, Brisbane rented out 159 acres (64 ha) of land to her in November 1823. In the centre of this area, Morgan built the Angel Inn. As more people began to settle into the area, both the inn and the shanty began to produce large amounts of money. Additionally, Morgan began to subdivide her lease, selling small parts of her land. Between her lease subdividing and the money produced by the inn and shanty, she eventually became one of the wealthiest people in the area. An article in the Australian newspaper on 23 January 1828 called her "one of the largest landholders on the Hunter River". In May 1830, she was fully granted the 159 acres (64 ha) of land that she had previously rented from the governor. She moved to Anvil Creek in 1830, where she bought 203 acres (82 ha) of land and had her own farm; she stayed there until her death in 1835.

Several features in the area Morgan lived in throughout her life were named after her. Wallis Plains was often commonly called Molly Morgan's Plains at the time, or Molly Morgan Plains, before it became named after Captain James Wallis. The pathway from Anvil Creek to Singleton is now known as Molly Morgan’s line of road. Molly Morgan Drive, a road in Maitland, and Molly Morgan Ridge, located in North Rothbury, New South Wales, were named after her. Morgan was unofficially given the title "Queen of the Hunter Valley" or "Queen of the Hunter River". In addition to owning and farming land, Morgan also helped other settlers in a variety of ways. In particular, she donated £100 to the Church Corporation to help build a school in East Maitland in 1827. In addition, she rode her horse to Sydney several times to negotiate with the governor regarding the execution of runaway convicts and turned part of her home into a hospital.

== Later life and death ==
During the last few years of her life, Morgan had difficulties sustaining the large amount of property she owned, due to sale irregularity issues, causing her wealth to quickly decrease. She was retired for the last few years of her life, living at Anvil Creek in Greta, New South Wales. She died there on 27 June 1835 (Note: Some sources believe that she died on 26 June, one day earlier, instead.) when she was 73 years old. At the time of her death, she no longer owned any property and had unpaid mortgage loans. After her death, she had a 3-inch (7.6 cm) long obituary, which was the largest ever published obituary at the time, saying:

. . . she was in the constant habit of lending the most valuable assistance to all who asked it – the settlers of the years 1820 to 1826 have reason to remember her, as many without the aid rendered by her, would not have borne themselves through the trying seasons of that period while many from her ignorance of accounts fattened themselves on her good will. The writer of these remarks, often favoured by her, only regrets that her latter days were not those of enjoyment of the comforts of life to which she was entitled from the numerous acts of kindness she had evinced to all around her.

== Bibliography ==
- Guilford, Elizabeth (1967). "Morgan, Molly (1762–1835)". Australian Dictionary of Biography. Vol. 2. National Centre of Biography, Australian National University.
- Swain, Emma (4 May 2012). "Maitland, from Old Molly Morgan's days ..." Maitland Mercury.
- Ellis, David (1 July 2015). "Molly Morgan, convict to "Queen"". Southern Highland News.
- Shipley, John (2017). "Diddlebury – The Unsinkable Molly Morgan". A-Z of Curious Shropshire: Strange Stories of Mysteries, Crimes and Eccentrics (Illustrated ed.). The History Press. ISBN 978-0750983174.
- Maitland (N.S.W.). Council (16 September 2009). Maitland: 1863–1963. Oswald Ziegler for the Council of the City of Maitland.
- McKenzie, Valerie (1982). The Passing Parade of Picnics & Pleasures: Early Australian Times. Centennial Publications. ISBN 978-0959498226.
- Scanlon, Mike (14 July 2018). "The life and legacy of Hunter pioneer Molly Morgan". The Newcastle Herald.
- Morgan, Molly (3 ed.). Grollier Society of Australia. 1977. ISBN 978-0959660401.
- "Molly Morgan On The Hell-Ship "Neptune"". Voice (Hobart). 11 August 1934. p. 2.
- "Amazing Story of Molly Morgan. Early Hunter Pioneer". The Cessnock Eagle and South Maitland Recorder. 1 October 1948. p. 5.
- Bateson, Charles (1974). The Convict Ships. Sydney, New South Wales. ISBN 0-85174-195-9.
- Beatty, William Alfred (1962). With shame remembered: early Australia. Cassell.

== See also ==
- Convicts in Australia
