= Elizabeth Steel =

English convict sent to Australia aboard a ship of the Second Fleet

Elizabeth Steele
- Born: c. 1766; England
- Died: 1795; Sydney, Australia
- Known for: Convict

Elizabeth Steel (c. 1766 – 1795) was an English convict sent to Australia aboard a ship of the Second Fleet. Convicted in 1787 for the theft of a silver watch worth thirty shillings, she was sentenced to seven years penal transportation which she served at the settlements of Port Jackson and Norfolk Island. She was freed in 1794 but died ten months later.

Steel arrived in Sydney Cove as a convict on board Lady Juliana on 3 June 1790, as part of the Second Fleet, aged 23 or 24. At the time of her sentencing authorities described her as being 'mute by visitation of God', which is the earliest record of a deaf Australian, but there is no historical evidence yet that she used a sign language. Her charge at the Old Bailey was for stealing a silver watch from George Childs, who was a customer at the public house she worked at as a prostitute. After two months in Sydney, Elizabeth Steel was transferred to Norfolk Island. In November 1791, Steel married a fellow convict, Irish born James Mackey. Together they successfully farmed a 10-acre (40,000 m^{2}) leasehold until the expiry of their sentences. Elizabeth returned to Sydney in 1794, but died the following year aged 29. Her burial at the Old Sydney Burial Ground was recorded on 8 June 1795.

== Headstone found ==
In 1991, Sydney Town Hall underwent major restoration works, during which excavations to lay new stormwater pipes under the Lower Town Hall, workmen discovered evidence of burials. Archaeologists were then employed to excavate the site and record their findings. Overlying the lid of one of the graves discovered in 1991 was the upper portion of a Georgian headstone, made of Sydney sandstone. Remnants of an inscription were visible:

In Memory of

Eliz Steel died

1795 Aged …

Although this headstone was found above the remains of the vault containing the skeletal remains of a female, forensic tests confirmed that there was no relationship between them. It is thought that the headstone may have fallen from another grave, possibly during the construction of the Town Hall in the late 1860s.

== See also ==
- List of convicts transported to Australia
