= Peter Hibbs =

British sailor and Australian settler (1757–1847)

Peter Kenney Hibbs
- Born: 1761; Ramsgate, Kent, England
- Died: 12 September 1847, aged 86; Pumpkin Point, New South Wales, Australia
- Resting place: Wisemans Ferry Cemetery, Laughtondale, New South Wales, Australia
- Occupation: Mariner - Colonial Maritime Explorer - Pioneer
- Years active: 1768 - 1847
- Known for: First Fleet Able Seaman and Master Mariner. Master of HM Norfolk Sloop, which carried Matthew Flinders, George Bass and a crew of 8 on the first ever circumnavigation of Van Diemen's Land (7 October 1798 - 12 January 1799), and carried Matthew Flinders, John Thistle and a crew of 8, up to map Moreton Bay and Hervey Bay in current day Queensland (8 July 1799 - 20 August 1799).
- Spouse(s): Mary Pardoe (1768–1844), Second Fleet convict
- Children: 6 sons 1 daughter 1 step-daughter

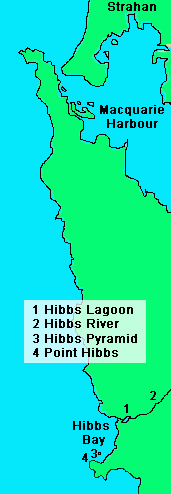
Hibbs Bay, Hibbs Lagoon, Hibbs River, Hibbs Pyramid & Point Hibbs in relation to Macquarie Harbour

Peter Kenney Hibbs (c. 1761 – 12 September 1847) was an English Mariner, Maritime Explorer and Pioneer.

Peter Hibbs claimed his entire life long, that he had first come to Australia in 1770, aboard HMS Endeavour with Lieutenant James Cook, , and to have stepped ashore at Botany Bay with Joseph Banks. *No primary independent evidence exists to verify these claims, although the circumstantial evidence continues to grow.

18 years later, Able Seaman Peter Hibbs (Crew #187) of the Flagship of the First Fleet, HMS Sirius, returned. in company of The First Fleet. He was one of few non-convict First Fleet members, known to have settled in the new Colony of New South Wales from 1788.

Following the arrival of the First Fleet, Peter Hibbs was part of the crew of HMS Sirius, during its supply dash voyage to Capetown, to feed the starving colony (2 October 1788 - 8 May of 1789).

The following month, he was chosen as a member of Governor Arthur Phillip's 2nd and 3rd expeditions of the Hawkesbury River in June and July 1789. Those two expeditions resulted in the discovery and naming of the Hawkesbury River. *No primary independent evidence exists to verify this claim, though strong circumstantial evidence does provide a compelling argument for it.

Following his shipwreck on Norfolk Island aboard HMS Sirius in March 1790, he, all but 22 of the Officers and Crew of HMS Sirius and everyone else on the Island, spent 11 months marooned there.

Sometime soon after August 1790, he met his future wife, Mary Pardoe and her infant daughter Ann, who had arrived there aboard the "Surprize". He formed a relationship with Mary Pardoe. 7 other Seamen and 2 Marines of the shipwrecked HMS Sirius also formed relationships with other female convicts. All 10 of them returned to Port Jackson aboard HMS Supply, in company of all of the remaining shipwrecked crew of HMS Sirius. On their return, they immediately made a request to Governor Arthur Phillip directly, in Port Jackson, seeking permission to become a Seaman Settlers on Norfolk Island. Their requests were granted, and Peter Hibbs received a land grant, returned to Norfolk Island, married Mary Pardoe, and became a Seaman Settler. (Land Grant Lot #54)

In 1794, he was part of a 40 person-militia, who acted to suppress a potential mutiny by disgruntled NSW Corps, at the direction of the Island's then Governor.

In February, March and April of 1798, he participated in the construction of a small single masted sloop called "The Norfolk Sloop". He was appointed Master of that vessel, by Captain John Townson, and subsequently sailed the vessel from Norfolk Island to Port Jackson, departing the Island on 5 May 1798, and arriving in Port Jackson on 15 June 1798.

On arrival in Port Jackson, the vessel was immediately seized, and Peter Hibbs was most likely summoned immediately, to the Governor's Residence, to explain why the illegally built ship existed. The Governor at that time was his former Captain aboard HMS Sirius, John Hunter who he had served under for almost 3 years, and had additionally survived 11 months of hell in company of, on Norfolk Island, following the shipwreck of HMS Sirius. John Hunter had since been promoted and become the governor of New South Wales.

Governor Hunter renamed the small vessel "HM NORFOLK SLOOP", reclassified her as a Government Survey Vessel and ordered that she be strengthened and refitted. He then reappointed Peter Hibbs as Master of the vessel and ordered him to transport Matthew Flinders and George Bass southward, to attempt a first ever circumnavigation of Van Diemen's Land. (*10 years earlier, John Hunter and his entire former crew aboard HMS Sirius, including Peter Hibbs, had come perilously close to being driven aground on its Southern tip, and all losing their lives, on their way back from Capetown, in 1798.)

The expeditionary voyage to attempt a circumnavigation of Van Diemen's Land took place from 7 October 1798 to 12 January 1799. Peter Hibbs carried Matthew Flinders and George Bass aboard the Norfolk Sloop (HM Norfolk Sloop), as well as John Thistle, Robert Webb, 3 Scottish Sailors, 2 other sailors, Tom Thumb 2 and George Bass's greyhound dog, "Governor".

On 11 December 1798, as the Norfolk sailed south down the west coast, during the successful circumnavigation of Tasmania, Matthew Flinders named Point Hibbs, a headland at the southern extremity of what is now known as Hibbs Bay, after Peter Hibbs, the Colonial Master of HM Norfolk Sloop.

A number of other coastal features in the surrounding area have since been named after Peter Hibbs, although it is unclear who named each of those other features:

Hibbs Bay, a bay on the western coast of Tasmania south of Macquarie Harbour

Hibbs Lagoon, a lagoon on the northern shore of Hibbs Bay

Hibbs River, a river flowing into Hibbs Lagoon and then discharging into Hibbs Bay

Hibbs Pyramid, a pyramid shaped island in southern Hibbs Bay

"Bass and Flinders named all kinds of geographical features in their own names on their trip around Tasmania. Peter Hibbs was the only other person after whom they named a Tasmanian geographical feature - apart from a couple in honour of Peter’s wife, Mary."

This voyage proved that Tasmania was an island and proved the existence of a straight between the mainland and that island. That straight was subsequently named Bass Strait, on recommendation of Matthew Flinders. The discovery of the Bass Strait shortened the travel distance and voyage time from England to Sydney. Ships had previously all sailed to the south of Tasmania.

Following their return to Port Jackson on 12 January 1799, Peter Hibbs did a return voyage to Norfolk Island with HM Norfolk Sloop, carrying supplies and dispatches (24 February 1799-26 April 1799),

He was then commanded to sail north Port Jackson (Sydney) to explore and chart Moreton Bay and Hervey Bay, with Matthew Flinders in command. The voyage took place 8 July 1799 to 20 August 1799. In doing so the Norfolk Sloop became the first British vessel, since the arrival of the First Fleet, to sail further North than the entrance to Broken Bay.

Following that successful expedition, HM Norfolk Sloop was reclassified as a Government Supply Vessel, and Peter Hibbs continued to operate it as Master, with a crew of 5, between the Colony in Port Jackson and The Hawkesbury River and its tributaries settlers, from September 1799 until the vessel was pirated by 15 convicts in October 1800.

== Birth and baptism ==
Mary Kenney and George Hibbs (*a native of Swanage, a seaside town in Dorset), married on 25 December 1760, at the parish church of St Laurence-in-Thanet, Ramsgate. The following year, in late 1761, their first son Peter Hibbs, was most likely born there, at Ramsgate, Kent. (*No birth record has yet been located for him, but this seems the most likely course of events. Both being Quakers of very strong religious conviction, in an era when having children out of wedlock was very scandalous, it was highly unlikely that Peter Hibbs was born, prior to his parent's wedding in 1760.)

Special Notes:

The age listed upon Peter Hibb's headstone (90 yrs), has long been assumed by many as being a very accurate testimony to his age, at his time of death. That assumption has caused much confusion and debate about when he was born, his paternity, and the facts surrounding the discrepancy with his parents wedding and his christening. *DNA test results from descendants have since shown matches with other Hibbs descendants, including in the UK, and have confirmed that Peter was indeed, a biological son of George Hibbs, laying that to rest.

Peter Hibbs was illiterate, and likely innumerate, and without the aid of calendars, clocks or any other reliable frame of reference, it is understandable that keeping track of his age accurately, became increasingly harder, over the course of his life. Another key point of note, is that his own and other Hibbs family member's ages were listed inaccurately on multiple musters and official records, over the course of his life. Rationally, the most accurate guide to his age and birthyear, were the ages officially listed, on his early Royal Navy records, when he joined the crew of HMS Goliath and then the crew of HMS Sirius the following year, in his 20s. By this measure, and a range of other norms of the era, a birth year of late 1761 is most likely.)

After the wedding of George Hibbs and Mary Kenney, which was witnessed by two members of Mary Kenney's family, George Hibbs, Mary Kenney Hibbs and Peter Hibbs moved the more than 200 miles (320 km) back to Swanage. On 24 January 1762, Peter was baptized at the parish church of St Mary the Virgin, Swanage, as Peter Kennel [sic] Hibbs, the son of George and Mary Hibbs.

Mollie Gillen has suggested that Hibbs was five years younger than this, born about 1762 at Ramsgate, a date which is based upon his baptism at Swanage, after the marriage of Mary Kenney and George Hibbs. (*Given his baptism occurred in January 1762, it is most likely that he was born in late 1761.)

== Cabin boy on HMB Endeavour in 1770? ==
Born in late 1761, this would have made him around 7 years of age on 26 August 1768 when HMS Endeavour sailed from England on its voyage of discovery. In the 18th century the Royal Navy encouraged boys as young as nine years of age to enlist as "servants," with the lower age not being raised to thirteen until 1794. However, these official rules were routinely flouted by Captains, and it was commonplace, for boys as young as 6 to be (unofficially) aboard, serving in roles as ship's boys and powder monkeys. If they turned 12 years old while aboard such ships, their names had to be officially listed, on their Ship's muster. If not, their names did not appear on the Ship's Muster Roll, as was the case with Peter Hibbs. Cabin boys performed a variety of functions such as errand boys, servants to officers, mess attendants, and on armed vessels as powder monkeys. However they were also apprentice seamen "learning the ropes" (literally) as they underwent sail training on the rigging. Stephen Yarrow states that since they were under-age, their names were often not recorded.

Hibbs maintained during his life-time that he had first come to Australia with Captain Cook in 1770. Hibbs also maintained that on 28 April 1770 when Joseph Banks had set off in a boat in Botany Bay in search for water and to explore the coast, that, following the distinguished naturalist, Hibbs had been the second person to jump ashore. These claims were repeated in the newspaper the Windsor and Richmond Gazette of 3 May 1890 on the death of his son Peter Kenney Hibbs Jnr. No primary evidence exists to support Hibbs' claim that he was the second person to step ashore in Botany Bay.

Stephen Yarrow maintains, however, that secondary independent evidence does exist to support Hibbs' claim to have been aboard HMS Endeavour. Stephen Yarrow maintains that in a report on the First Fleet, Arthur Phillip recorded that Hibbs had been especially chosen to join the crew of HMS Sirius because Hibbs "had previously visited these shores". The only ship to have "previously visited these shores" was HMS Endeavour.

== Able seaman on HMS Sirius 1787–1790 ==
Hibbs naval record commences on 24 August 1786 when he was appointed as an able seaman aboard the 74-gun battleship HMS Goliath. On 25 March 1787 Hibbs was transferred to the 10-gun HMS Sirius. (HMS Sirius was armed with six carronades, short cannons used to fire large objects to smash ships. She also had four six-pounder guns. There were another ten six-pounder guns in the cargo hold to be used to protect the new settlement.)

HMS Sirius was the flagship of the First Fleet.

HMS Sirius was never meant to be the Flagship of the First Fleet bound for Botany Bay. One moment she was the Berwick;, a burnt out hulk bought by the Royal Navy, fitted out "with refuse of the yard", renamed Sirius and next she found herself leading the First Fleet out of Portsmouth Harbour with the newly appointed Governor and Captain of the Flagship - Arthur Phillip.

Allen Maunder in his book Sailing on...The Hibbs Line describes the difficulty of the voyage:

Imagine going around Cape Horn [sic] on a Sydney Harbour Ferry packed with one hundred and sixty men, bulls, cows, horses, sheep, hogs, goats, fowl, stores, plants and a piano (!) and you have some idea of the voyage to Australia! It is a testament to the bravery and fortitude of the Captain and crews that the Fleet arrived intact and finally gained the shelter of Sydney Cove on 26th January 1788.

HMS Sirius (511 tons, 110 ft 5 in [33.7 m] x 32 ft 9 in [9.98 m]) was one of two naval ships in the First Fleet, the other being the older and smaller, but faster, HMS Supply (175 tons). (In November 1787 at Cape Town Arthur Phillip transferred from HMS Sirius to the faster HMS Supply.) The rest of the fleet was made up of nine privately owned merchant vessels, making eleven vessels in total.

After leaving England with the rest of the fleet on 13 May 1787, stopping at Santa Cruz at Tenerife, Rio de Janeiro in Brazil, Cape Town in South Africa, rounding the base of Tasmania and then travelling north up the east coast of Australia, HMS Sirius arrived in Botany Bay on 21 January 1788 to join some of the ships that had arrived just days earlier. The whole fleet then transferred north to Sydney Cove in Port Jackson on 26 January 1788. After completing their duties the nine merchant ships sailed back to England, and only HMS Sirius and HMS Supply remained in the colony.

The next voyage of HMS Sirius, with Hibbs aboard, began on 2 October 1788 and lasted more than seven months until 8 May 1789. This was a voyage to Cape Town to get much needed flour and other supplies for the Colony of New South Wales. Leaving Cape Town in January 1789, this voyage was a complete circumnavigation of the globe in an easterly direction. As a result Hibbs was a crewman aboard the first ship to circumnavigate the globe in Antarctic latitudes. The ship travelled from Sydney, past Cape Horn at the base of South America, over to Cape Town, rounding the Cape of Good Hope near the base of South Africa, rounding the base of Tasmania, and then sailing back to Sydney. This route, taking advantage of the strong westerly winds of the Roaring Forties and the Furious Fifties made faster time in a sailing ship than the more direct, shorter by distance, westerly route from Sydney to Cape Town which fought against the winds. To make the distance travelled as short as possible (the infant Colony of New South Wales was starving and it was imperative that HMS Sirius return with supplies in the shortest possible time) the master, John Hunter, ordered the ship south into Antarctic latitudes, running terrible risks with ice-bergs. Ice-bergs did not endanger the ship, but the trip was not to be without incident. A gale near Tasmania on the last leg of the journey nearly drove the ship ashore, smashed the ship's figurehead and badly damaged the front of the ship. Only the endurance of the master, John Hunter, and his exhausted and scurvy afflicted crew saved the ship from destruction.

As a result of the damage to the ship during the trip to Cape Town, HMS Sirius was careened in Mosman Bay on its return to Sydney.

During the time that HMS Sirius was careened, in June 1789, Governor Arthur Phillip lead an expedition which resulted in the discovery of the Hawkesbury River. From stories that his father had told him, Hibbs' son, Peter Kenney Hibbs Junior, claimed that Hibbs was chosen by Governor Arthur Phillip as a crewman for the 2nd and 3rd expeditions, and at that time Hibbs "took a fancy to a piece of land" on Second Branch (The Colo River) that he was later granted in August 1803. There is no primary independent evidence to verify these claims.

== The wreck of HMS Sirius, 19 March 1790 ==
In March 1790 HMS Sirius, with a crew of about 130 including Hibbs, and HMS Supply, sailed to Norfolk Island, 1000 nautical miles from Sydney, to drop off four companies of marines, over 180 male and female convicts, 27 children, livestock and supplies for the settlement there. An unplanned export for the island was a pair of rock plover pigeons aboard HMS Sirius which established the colony of pigeons still found on the island today. After unloading the marines, convicts and children, bad weather made getting the supplies ashore impossible. Four days later Captain John Hunter tried to land the supplies on HMS Sirius in Sydney Bay. The ship drifted too far into the bay and was wrecked on a reef on 19 March. Attempts were made to get the ship off the reef but these proved futile. It was eventually decided to abandon the ship, and all of the crew made it to shore. To rescue the crew a rope was fastened to a barrel and floated ashore and then fastened to a pine tree that allowed the men to scramble to land. The ship was now empty apart from some surviving livestock. Two convicts volunteered to swim out and release the animals. These two convicts then became drunk on rum left aboard the ship and set fire to the ship, which had to be extinguished by a marine who swam out to the wreck. Fortunately, all goods that were presumed to float had previously been thrown overboard but much was lost on the reef or the shoreline over the next two weeks where some were looted. The supplies that could not float were still aboard the wreck, and over the next two years the ship was stripped for wood, hardware, and supplies until the remains of the ship were down to the waterline.

On 24 March 1790 HMS Supply sailed back to Sydney with news of the wreck carrying 22 of the crew from HMS Sirius. The rest of the crew, including Hibbs, were left on the island for 11 months.

The situation on the island was now critical, with 400 extra mouths to feed, many of the supplies from HMS Sirius lost or not immediately accessible, and the supplies from HMS Supply not having been able to be landed. Hibbs took part in salvage operations, whenever the tide and weather permitted, as the only means of obtaining some of those needed supplies. An extract from a letter sent by a non-commissioned officer on HMS Sirius dated August 1790 describes the situation:

From the time of the wreck to the latter end of April, we never let slip a single opportunity of working the Ship and by the 10th of the above month had preserved the under mentioned quantity of provisions which was all we had to depend upon and our sanguine Expectation of a relief given up until next Season, or by supposition of the supply bringing ships from some European Settlement, which, within the Bounds of probability, could not be sooner than six months.

In desperation, the settlers began to take for food the local Mount Pitt birds, christened the "Providence" petrel. The settlers took so many that the bird became extinct on Norfolk Island. The non-commissioned officer on HMS Sirius further described in his letter of August 1790:

The Birds come to the island about the middle of March and, by the middle of April, eggs were plentiful. It would be impossible for me to give an account of the number of birds and eggs...by the middle of May to the beginning of June there was no scarcity in any part of the Town and were bartered at a very cheap rate. On the 19th April, the Birds became so very plentiful (and our Store so lean) the Governor issued out a condition that if every person would give up half a pound of his salt meat they might kill and bring home as many birds as he pleased (as long as it did not interfere with their Work)…It is worthy of remark that these birds were coming in when our sad and melancholy Catastrophe happened and were very scarce at the arrival of the relief.

Even though in the meantime the outgoing Justinian and Surprize from the Second Fleet were able to visit the island with some supplies to avert absolute starvation, it was February 1791, 11 months after the wreck, before a ship was able to be sent to Norfolk Island to carry most of the crew back to Sydney. Hibbs stayed on the island. A letter from Lieutenant-Governor Robert Ross to Governor Arthur Phillip carried on that ship describes the conditions on Norfolk Island from the time of the wreck until the date of the letter:

with respect to necessaries, not one of them [the detachment under my command] have a shoe to their feet, nor scarce a shirt to their backs; their situation at this juncture is truly deplorable, both men and women having lost almost everything by the wreck of the Sirius …The troops are also in great want of cooking utensils; there are but a few small pots among them all, which have been saved from the wreck of the Sirius...there is not a pot for every twelve men.

Following the wrecking Captain John Hunter faced a court-martial in England. As no fault could be found in Captain Hunter or any other officers on board when she struck the reef an honourable discharge was given. Captain John Hunter was next made Governor of the young Colony of New South Wales when Arthur Phillip returned to England in late 1792.

== Life on Norfolk Island, March 1790– April 1799 ==
Being wrecked on Norfolk Island on 19 March 1790 began a new chapter in the life of Peter Hibbs. He first had to endure a perilous rescue scrambling along a rope to the shore, but he had an advantage that many other seamen did not have as he could swim. He then shared in the deprivations of the other settlers in the island, and his next months were spent in salvage operations to alleviate their common plight.

=== Wife and family ===
In early August 1790 the Second Fleet convict transport the Surprize arrived at Norfolk Island carrying 150 female and 35 male convicts, and some supplies, for the little colony on Norfolk Island. Among these convicts was Mary Pardoe. Mary had been convicted of theft and sentenced to seven years transportation on 2 April 1788 at the Warwick Assizes. Her age was given as 18 on the 1789 embarkation list for the Second Fleet transport Lady Juliana. With Mary was her baby daughter Ann who had been born aboard the Lady Juliana in the days before it had anchored in Port Jackson on 6 June 1790 after a voyage of 10 months. Ann, christened in Sydney on 20 June 1790, had been fathered by a seaman aboard the Lady Juliana, Edward Scott, who had been sent back with his ship on 25 July 1790. Mary Pardoe was sent to Norfolk Island as a single mother. Mary was soon in a relationship with Peter Hibbs, and Ann was given his surname and raised as his daughter. In the 1806 muster of New South Wales Mary Pardoe is recorded as the "wife of P.Hibbs", a fact that is confirmed in later censuses. It is therefore assumed that Peter Hibbs, about 10 years older than his bride, married Mary Pardoe in November 1791 when Rev. Richard Johnson visited Norfolk Island for three weeks and married many couples (no records were kept). Nine months earlier, in February 1791, the remaining shipwrecked Officers and crew of HMS Sirius had been taken off the island back to Sydney. Peter Hibbs returned with them, and he and 9 others successfully applied to become Seaman Settlers on Norfolk Island, direct to Governor Arthur Phillip. Their request were granted and he returned to live on the island to be with Mary Pardoe.

In about 1791 (Mollie Gillen records the date as 16 May, and another source records the date as 3 January 1792) Hibbs received a 60 acre grant of land on Norfolk Island on the south side of the Cascade Run, Phillipsburg, 13 acres hilly and 47 acres level, but all plough-able. Hibbs soon had 9 acres under cultivation. In October 1793 Hibbs sold half of his 60 acres to Aaron Davis for £30, but was still able to sell grain to the government stores in 1794.

In 1792 Mary gave birth to Peter Hibbs' first son, George, named after Hibbs' father. George was to be followed by Peter Hibbs (Jnr the 1st), in 1794. Sadly, Peter Hibbs (Jnr the 1st) did not survive his infancy, passing away in 1798, on Norfolk Island. He lays at rest within the Turtle Bay burial grounds, beside what is now known as Emily Bay.

Peter Hibbs had been farming Lot 54 on Norfolk Island from 1791, and in 1796, he took a position as a Pilot of Ships on Norfolk Island. The same year, he would have met Matthew Flinders and George Bass, who visited Norfolk Island aboard HMS Reliance, for the first time.

In 1798, a 16-ton decked-sloop, known as The Norfolk Sloop (*often referred to as being 25 ton, in some official records), was constructed on the orders of Captain Townson, the commanding officer of the island, with the aim of establishing regular contact between Norfolk Island and Sydney. Peter Hibbs helped build the vessel, and used his experience at sea, to be appointed Master of that colonial-built vessel.

Built during February, March and April of 1798, the Norfolk Sloop was concealed from view, built in a side launch, (gravity-launch) slipway structure, on the foreshore of Turtle Bay (* Known as Emily Bay nowadays) using Norfolk Pine timber from the island, and timber and other hardware items that had been salvaged from the wreck of HMS Sirius. On its completion The Norfolk Sloop was immediately launched sideways off its wooden slipway, directly into the shallow, calm, protected waters of Turtle Bay (Emily Bay) at high tide on 5 May 1798. It was then rowed out through the then, significantly wider, natural channel through the reef, using its long sweep. It was then anchored outside the reef, and loaded using longboats, prior to departure for the mainland. (Note: The Coral Reefs have grown over the intervening few hundred years, from what they were, back in 1798-1799.) Turtle Bay had been used regularly for small boat landings and launches, during that early era.

Departing Norfolk Island on 5 May 1798, with a crew of volunteer seamen from Norfolk Island, Peter Hibbs sailed the Norfolk Sloop the 1670 km from Norfolk Island, and into Port Jackson (Sydney) on the 15 June 1798.

The boat was immediately confiscated there, as there was a law against boat-building. The governor wanted to give no opportunities to convicts, to steal a boat and escape from the colony. The colony was, however, short of vessels for exploration and trade. Accordingly, Governor Hunter, Peter Hibbs's previous Captain aboard HMS Sirius, ordered that the vessel be refitted, strengthened and prepared for an expeditionary voyage by Matthew Flinders and George Bass. Peter Hibbs was placed back in charge of the Norfolk and assigned the job of taking Matthew Flinders and George Bass on the voyage to discover if Van Diemen's Land (Tasmania) was an island, and whether a strait existed between it, and the mainland. The expeditionary voyage was completed from 7 October 1798 to 12 January 1799.

Following the successful voyage, Peter Hibbs and a small crew remained in Port Jackson with one of their number, Able Seaman Robert Webb, who had fallen ill, aboard HMS Reliance. Following his death on 19 February 1799, aboard HMS Reliance, HM Norfolk Sloop was loaded with supplies and dispatches. Peter Hibbs and a small crew departed Port Jackson on 24 February 1799 and returned to Norfolk Island. They arrived at Norfolk Island in early March 1799, unloaded supplies by long boat, and then used sweeps again, to safely row the Sloop back inside the safe sheltered waters of Turtle Bay (now Emily Bay). They most likely did so via the natural channel through the reef, which was significantly wider in 1798 and 1799, than it is in the current era. The reef has grown significantly since then, closing the gap, despite previous attempts at blasting and enlarging it. In that era, the channel was wider, and the lagoon itself was deeper. Many sea turtles had used the lagoon, in the early years, hence its name of that era.

On returning to the Island, following years of droughts and hardship, Peter Hibbs likely returned to the news that his second son, Peter Hibbs Jnr (1794-1798) had died in his absence. It may have been the last straw, because he sold the remainder of his land grant Lot 54. It appears most likely that Peter Hibbs made the decision to take his wife Mary Pardoe, Ann Scott Pardoe Hibbs and oldest son George Hibbs, aboard HM Norfolk Sloop, and relocate his family back to the mainland, departing mid-April, arriving in Port Jackson on 26 April 1799.

Immediately following their return to Port Jackson on 26 April 1799, Matthew Flinders immediately began making preparations of HM Norfolk Sloop, for the next expedition in her, northward to survey Moreton Bay and Hervey Bay, in modern day Queensland. That second historic voyage took place from 8 July 1799 to 20 August 1799.

Following their return to Port Jackson, after that successful expedition, HM Norfolk Sloop was reclassified and became The First Government Supply Vessel operating on the Hawkesbury, between the Colony in Port Jackson and the Settlers along the Hawkesbury River and its tributaries, from September 1799.

3rd son, Peter Kenney Hibbs Junior the 2nd, was born back in the mainland Colony, in 1800.

In October 1800, when it was pirated by 15 convicts. In October 1800, while the ship was being used to carry locally grown produce from the Windsor area on the Hawkesbury River to Port Jackson (Sydney), the Norfolk was pirated, the crew was put ashore unharmed, and the vessel was subsequently wrecked on Pirates Point at Stockton, in bad weather.

Late in 1800, Peter Hibbs was listed as being "in care of His Majesty's Ship Supply". Hibbs, as Quarter Master & Masters Mate, then joined the armed vessel HMS Porpoise in 1801. In that capacity, Peter Hibbs did multiple voyages to Tahiti to acquire Pork. Mollie Gillen records that serving with Hibbs on HMS Porpoise was his young son George. Peter Hibbs and his son George, aboard that ship, transported the first settlers to found the colony at Hobart, in early 1803. Peter Hibbs and his oldest son George Hibbs were discharged from HMS Porpoise at Sydney, in August 1803.

== Life on the mainland, 26 April 1799– 12 September 1847 ==
To support his family Hibbs became a part-owner of the Trimmer, a small 20 ton sloop, which he sailed between Sydney and the Hawkesbury River, servicing the farms established there.

Their son William was born at sea, though not enroute between Norfolk Island and Sydney, as has often previously been stated. A more likely scenario is that he was born aboard Sloop Trimmer in January 1804, between the Hawkesbury River and Port Jackson, as the family were already back on the mainland from April 1799.

On 11 August 1804 (Mollie Gillen records the date as September 1803) Hibbs was granted 100 acres on the first loop of Second Branch (*the Colo River), where he established his growing family. His young son George was granted the adjoining 100 acres. This farm, situated upon the second branch of the river, and bounded upon both sides by the water found on the south side of the Hawkesbury River, to which it has on extensive frontage of about two miles, then became known as "Hibbs' Farm" even after Hibbs no longer owned it. Since 1812, it has been known as Reibey Farm or Reibey Estate.

In the 1806 muster of New South Wales Hibbs is recorded as farming a 100 acre grant "down the river", with 10 acres under wheat, 6 acres under corn, 1 acre under barley, ½ acre in orchard/garden, 74½ acres under pasture (or uncleared), and 8 acres fallow. He is also recorded as having 3 male goats, 6 female goats, 6 male hogs, 6 female hogs, and 3 bushells of maize in hand. The persons on the farm are recorded as Hibbs, Mary, 5 children and 2 convict labourers, all not victualled by the government. His eldest son George, only 14 years old, is shown as farming a 100 acre grant, all in pasture (or uncleared). One of the other 5 children recorded was his step-daughter Ann, who before 1809 married the convict John Izard who had arrived on the Perseus in 1802. The other 3 children were Peter Jnr, William, and Sarah. His wife Mary is also recorded separately as Mary Pardoe, wife of P Hibbs.

There were 3 separate huge floods of the Hawkesbury and Colo Rivers, in March, June and November 1806. These floods will have wiped out Peter Hibbs and Mary Pardoe's cultivated land and home on that Colo River property, and most likely forced a retreat to refuge in the largest of two caves on that property. It lays on high ground, about 100m from today's modern guest accommodation building, on the property's entry road.

In August 1806, newly appointed Governor William Bligh met with the ordinary Settlers of the region, at the town of Green Hills (now Windsor), and pledged his support for them, following these devastating floods. He organized flood relief, dispatched seed maize and promised Government Stores would purchase the settler's next harvests to counter spectacular exploitation by the Officers of the Rum Corps. Peter Hibbs was a signatory to a letter from the Hawkesbury River settlers to Governor William Bligh, thanking him for his actions in aiding them. Governor William Blighs actions in aiding the Settlers, and his general crackdown on the rum trade and existing monopolies, put him in direct conflict with John Macarthur and the Rum Corps, which in turn led to the Rum Rebellion.

On 26 January 1808 a military coup took over the government of New South Wales from the then Governor, William Bligh. Hibbs was spared the foreclosures on loans suffered by many of Bligh's supporters, and "...appears to have had two bob three ways...", having signed petitions both supporting and opposing the usurpers.

In 1809 more devastating floods hit the Hawkesbury and Colo River settlers' properties, and they in turn, led to further exploitation of them, by unscrupulous predatory lenders and the exploitative actions of the monopoly power holding Rum Corps officers.

Peter Hibbs was frequently before the courts for debts to his creditors, as were many other Settlers along the Hawkesbury and Colo Rivers. The first occasion was on 26 March 1810 for owing money to Henry Kable Jnr. As a result an order was made against Hibbs and "A Quantity of Houshold Furniture, a few Pigs and Goats, and other Effects,...Two Stacks of Wheat and about Four Hundred Bushels of Bread Corn" belonging to Hibbs was sold by the Provoct Marshall at public auction on 17 May 1810. Hibbs was next before the courts on 24 July 1812 for owing money to Thomas Brady, and on 28 October 1812 for owing money to Mary Reibey. As a result, in October 1812 Hibbs was forced to sell his 100 acre grant at Mulgrave Place to Mary Reibey for £100, to repay debts he owed. This forced the Hibbs family to move to Windsor, to other accommodation and alternative employment.

He again found himself before the courts on 30 April 1814 for owing money to Henry Kable Snr.

By 1816 Hibbs was owner of the small sloop Recovery, which he sailed between Sydney and the Hawkesbury River, servicing the farms established there. The Sydney Gazette newspaper of 6 July 1816 carried the account of the wreck of this vessel:

The Recovery, Peter Hibbs owner, on her passage from Hawkesbury with grain about a month since, was blown out to sea, and at length wrecked near Port Stevens due to tempestuous weather.

Hibbs next had to walk with his crew, his son George, and his female passenger along the coast about 80 kilometres to the nearest settlement at Newcastle, but on the way they were stripped of their clothing by natives and exposed to the Winter weather:

The crew, two men accompanied by a woman, walked in to Newcastle, which is a distance of about fifty miles, keeping by the sea coast. On their distressing journey they unfortunately encountered a horde of natives, who stripped them of their clothing, and left them to the rigours of an inclement season. Their distresses were humanely relieved by the Commandant of Newcastle;

Having obtained passage on the sloop Windsor back to Sydney, Hibbs, George and his passenger were again wrecked at Long Reef (near Collaroy Beach) and again had to walk along the coast with the crew and other passengers of the Windsor until able to obtain a further passage to Sydney, there being none of the modern bridges across Port Jackson that today would have allowed them to walk all the way:

and obtaining a passage for Sydney in another small vessel, the sloop Windsor, of about twenty two tons burthen, belonging to Henry Major, were again cast away, this vessel having been unfortunately wrecked upon the Long Reef, from whence they walked in.

These being the 3rd and 4th shipwrecks that Peter Hibbs had survived, with the last two in very quick succession, Peter Hibbs likely interpreted them as a warning from the Lord, and he immediately moved to baptize the other 4 remaining children in October 2016, at St Mathews Anglican Church, Windsor. Evidence suggests that Peter Hibbs then permanently gave up his life as a Mariner.

With Sloop Recovery having been lost, along with his means of income, it is likely that the family then relocated from Windsor to reside in Hibbs Cave, 500m on the north side of Pumpkin Point Creek, in a rock ledge overhang known as Hibbs's Cave, while then working the land of the land grant described as follows.

In 1821 Hibbs received another grant of 60 acres of land at Courangra Point at Haycock Reach, Hawkesbury River. The deed for this land was, however, not registered until 30 June 1823. This was land that Hibbs had already been permitted to occupy. Hibbs, illiterate, had previously had a Memorial written for him requesting ownership of this land. In this Memorial dated 30 June 1820 Hibbs stated that he had arrived on HMS Sirius, had been Quarter Master and Master's Mate on HMS Porpoise, had a wife and 7 children, and had already built a home and had sewn 14 acres in wheat.

In 1821 his son Peter Kenney Hibbs Jnr also received a grant of land having requested the same on 28 June 1820 stating in his Memorial that he had reached the age of 21, when he had not in fact yet reached that age. Both Peter Hibbs Snr and Peter Hibbs Jnr became entitled to receive a further grant of land in 1825.

In the 1822 muster of New South Wales Hibbs, Peter Jnr and William are all shown as Landholders in the district of Windsor. His wife Mary is recorded as Mary Pardo, employed by P Hibbs, Windsor.

In 1824 Hibbs, "Of Lower Branch, Hawkesbury; mariner" was on a list of persons liable to serve as jurors in the District of Windsor.

In the 1825 muster of New South Wales Hibbs is shown as a Landholder in the district of Wilberforce. His sons Peter Jnr, William, Richard and Joseph are also shown with their ages accurately recorded. His wife Mary is recorded as Mary Pardo, wife of P Hibbs, Wilberforce.

In the 1828 Census of New South Wales Hibbs is shown as farming 60 acres, with 18 acres being cleared and cultivated, in the district of Lower Portland Head. Ages recorded in this Census are Hibbs - 64, Mary - 56, George - 34, Peter Jnr - 26, William - 24, Richard - 21, and Joseph - 19. Only the age for William is recorded correctly.

On 21 February 1832 Hibbs sold his 60 acres of land at Courangra Point to Thomas Edwards for £15. This grant was later described at a subsequent sale as:

sixty acres more or less, situate, lying, and being, in the county of Cumberland and district of Castlereagh, bounded on the north, east and west sides by the HAWKESBURY RIVER, and on the south side by mountains

Hibbs' wife Mary died on 19 May 1844. Hibbs survived her by 3 years. On 12 September 1847, aged 90 years, Hibbs died at Pumpkin (Creek) Point on the Hawkesbury River, where his step-son-in-law John (aka Joseph) Izard owned an acre of land. Both Peter Hibbs and his wife Mary are buried in the Wisemans Ferry Cemetery at Laughtondale, an area that was then known as Lower Portland Head.
