= Neptune (1780 ship) =

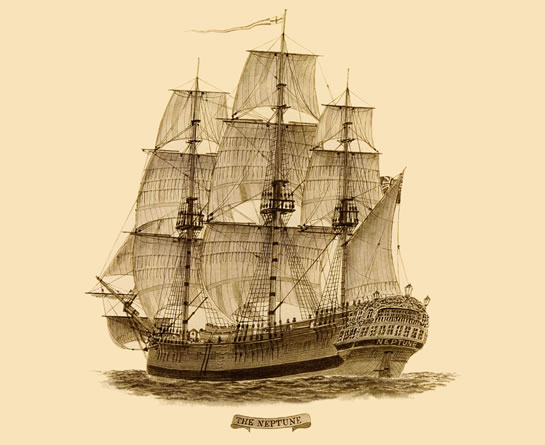
- Neptune

History

Great Britain
- Name: Neptune
- Owner: Voyage #1:Andrew Moffat; Voyages #2-4:Thomas Loughman
- Builder: Dudman, Deptford, or Barnard
- Launched: 7 February 1780
- Fate: Destroyed by fire and explosion in 1796

General characteristics
- Type: Ship
- Tons burthen: 809, or 80970/94 (bm)
- Length: 144 ft 0 in (43.9 m) (overall); 116 ft 4 in (35.5 m) (keel)
- Beam: 36 ft 2 in (11.0 m)
- Depth of hold: 15 ft 2 in (4.6 m)
- Sail plan: Ship rig

Neptune was a three-decker East Indiaman launched in 1780 at Deptford. She made five voyages for the British East India Company (EIC), the last one transporting convicts to Port Jackson as one of the vessels of the notorious Second Fleet. This voyage resulted in a private suit against the master and chief officer for wrongful death. A fire and explosion in 1796 at Cape Town destroyed Neptune.

== EIC voyages ==
=== EIC voyage #1 (1780-1783) ===
Captain Robert Scott left Portsmouth on 3 June 1780, bound for Madras, Bengal, and Bombay. On 29 September she reached Rio de Janeiro, and arrived at Madras on 10 January 1781. From there she sailed to Bengal, arriving at Kedgeree on 12 March. On 7 May she was at Barrabulla, also in the Hooghli River, before returning to Kedgeree on 20 May. Leaving Bengal she was at Barrabulla again on 15 September. On 6 October she reached Madras, on 21 October Negapatam, on 17 December Bombay, on 11 April 1782 Tellicherry, on 27 April Calicut, on 6 May Tellicherry again, and on 28 May Bombay again. Homeward bound, on 31 January 1783 Neptune was at St Helena, and she arrived at The Downs on 8 August.

=== EIC voyage #2 (1784-1785) ===
Captain George Scott left The Downs on 26 March 1784, bound for Bombay. By 29 July Neptune had reached Johanna, and she arrived at Bombay on 24 August. She arrived at Tellicherry on 23 October, before returning to Bombay on 9 November. Homeward bound, she reached Cochin on 7 April 1785, and St Helena on 5 July, before arriving at The Downs on 5 September.

=== EIC voyage #3 (1786-1787) ===
Captain George Scott left The Downs on 13 March 1786, bound for China. Neptune arrived at Whampoa on 28 August. Homeward bound, she crossed the Second Bar on 25 December, reached St Helena on 28 April 1787, and arrived at The Downs on 5 July.

=== EIC voyage #4 (1788-1789) ===
Captain George Scott left The Downs on 14 April 1788, again bound for China. Neptune arrived at Whampoa on 6 October. Homeward bound, she crossed the Second Bar on 20 December, reached St Helena on 6 May 1789, and arrived at The Downs on 12 July.

== Second Fleet to Australia ==
Captain Thomas Gilbert started the voyage on 17 November 1789, bound for Botany Bay and China. In company with Surprize and Scarborough, Neptune finally sailed from England with about 502 convicts (424 male and 78 female) on 19 January 1790. At some point on the voyage Gilbert died and his replacement as master was Donald Trail; the surgeon was William Gray. She arrived at the Cape of Good Hope on 13 April 1790, and spent sixteen days there, taking on provisions, and twelve male convicts from HMS Guardian, which had been wrecked after striking an iceberg. heavy weather resulted in Neptune and Scarborough parting from Surprize, with Neptune arriving at Port Jackson on 28 June, 160 days out from England. During the voyage 147 male and 11 female convicts died, for a total death rate of 31%; 269 (53%) were sick when landed. The high death-rate and harsh treatment of the convicts prompted Governor Phillip to order an inquiry to find the persons responsible. About this time, Captain Trail is reported to have “absconded.”

=== Conditions and treatment on board ===
Each male convict was chained and, according to one account, the shackles were the same as those used in the slave trade. Most of the male convicts were on the orlop deck and slept in four rows of cabins. Three large tubs were used as toilets. The female convicts were housed in an upper deck section and were not chained.

The treatment of convicts aboard Neptune was cruel. Convicts suspected of petty theft were flogged to death and most convicts remained chained below decks for the duration of the voyage. Scurvy and other diseases were endemic and the food rations were pitiful. Neptune had a death rate of 158 out of 502 or 31%, the second highest death rate among all convict voyages. It was later alleged bodies had been carelessly thrown overboard and four were sighted floating on shore near Portsmouth. Convicts received short allowances of food and water, with many almost starving to death.

Neptune returned to Britain on 27 October 1791.

=== Trial ===
Well after their return to England, on 9 June 1792 Donald Traill and Chief Mate, William Ellerington were privately prosecuted for the murder of an unnamed convict, along with a seaman named Andrew Anderson and a cook named John Joseph. After a trial lasting three hours before Sir James Marriott in the Admiralty Court, the jury acquitted both men on all charges "without troubling the Judge to sum up the evidence". There were no public prosecutions as public prosecutions in Britain did not exist until 1880. Later, the lawyer who brought the charge was struck from the Rolls.

=== Notable arrivals ===
Amongst the arrivals on this voyage was D'Arcy Wentworth, a free assistant surgeon. He apparently fathered a child by his convict mistress, Catherine Crowley, conceived early on the voyage. The child William Wentworth was born on Norfolk Island and became a major figure. John Macarthur, his wife Elizabeth, and their son Edward Macarthur left England on Neptune but transferred to Scarborough after a quarrel with the captain. A photograph of Edward Macarthur exists, and is the only known photo of a passenger on Neptune.

Sarah Cobcroft (née Smith), de facto wife of convict John Cobcroft, also arrived aboard Neptune. She was a midwife and later pioneer farmer of Wilberforce, New South Wales.

Molly Morgan, born Mary Jones, was another convict who sailed to Australia on the Neptune.

== Fate ==
Neptune was last listed in Lloyd's Register in 1796 with T. Gilbert, master, and Calvert & Co., owners.

Neptune sailed from Portsmouth on 6 March 1796. She was bound for India to serve there in the coastal trade. However, at Cape Town a fire and explosion destroyed her. She was not carrying any cargo on behalf of the EIC.
