= Mary Wade =

British convict (1775–1859)

- Born: 17 December 1775; Southwark, London, England
- Died: 17 December 1859 (aged 84); Fairy Meadow, New South Wales
- Spouse: Jonathan Brooker (m. 1817)
- Children: 21?

Mary Wade (17 December 1775 – 17 December 1859) was a British teenager and convict who was transported to Australia when she was 13 years old. She was the youngest convict aboard Lady Juliana, part of the Second Fleet. Her family grew to include five generations and over 300 descendants in her own lifetime.

== Early years in London ==
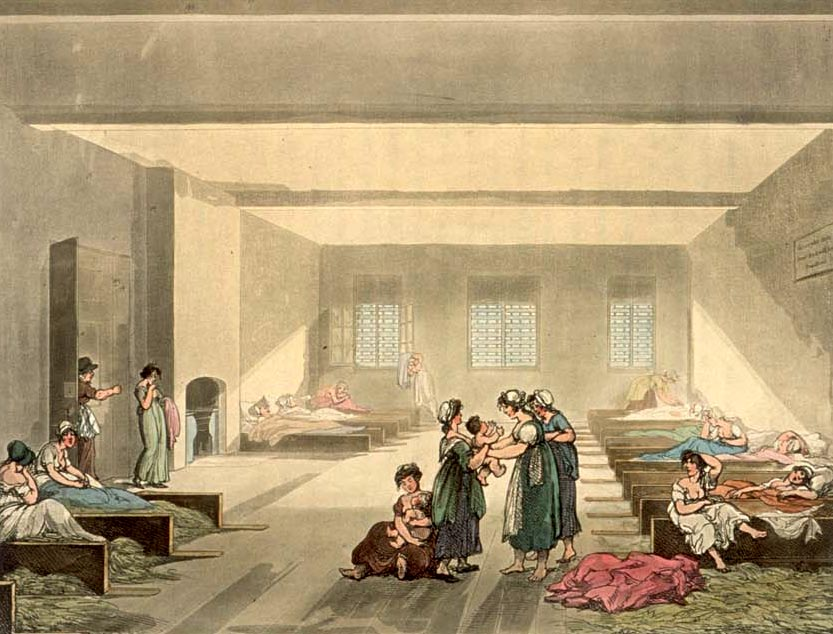
The Pass Room at Bridewell where Mary was first imprisoned

Researchers in the 1980s believed that Wade was born on 5 October 1777 at Southwark, London, to Mary English and George Wade, and was christened on 21 December 1777 at St Olave's Church, Southwark, Surrey, England however, a later group of researchers, with access to records not previously available, now believe that Wade was born on 17 December 1775, in the parish of Westminster St Margaret and St John, Middlesex, to Lawrence Wade (died August 1794, Perkins Rents, Westminster) and Mary Smith (died November 1836, 5 New Court, Westminster), and was baptised on 7 January 1776, at St Margaret's, Westminster.

Evidence for her revised date of birth and parents includes:

- Her mother stated during the trial that her daughter was born in December.
- Mary Wade was living in St Margaret's parish in Westminster at the time of her arrest.
- Her death certificate records that she was born in Westminster.
- Lawrence Wade died at Perkins Rents in 1794 — Mary was living there at the time of her trial in 1789.

If the new research is accurate, Mary had at least three siblings: Elizabeth Ann Wade (born 5 February 1778 and baptised 1 March 1778 at St Margaret's Westminster), Henrietta (born 17 November 1780 and baptised 10 December 1780 at St Margaret's Westminster), and Henry (born 1 August 1786, baptised 20 August 1786, died April 1793 and buried 24 April 1793, at St Margaret's.

Wade spent her days sweeping the streets of London, as a means of begging. On 5 January 1789, Mary, with another child, Jane Whiting, 14 years old, stole clothes (one cotton frock, one linen tippet, one linen cap) from Mary Phillips, an 8-year-old, who at the time was collecting water in a bottle at a privy. They then sold the frock to a pawnbroker. Mary was reported to an Officer of the Law by another child who later found the tippet in Mary's room, whereupon she was arrested and placed in Bridewell Prison. Her trial was held on 14 January 1789 at the Old Bailey, where she was found guilty and sentenced to death by hanging.

== Penal transportation ==
On 11 March 1789, King George III was proclaimed cured of an unnamed madness; it is assumed that he suffered from porphyria, a degenerative mental disease. A month later, in the spirit of celebration, all the women on death row, including Mary Wade, had their sentences commuted to penal transportation to Australia. Wade spent 93 days in the Newgate Prison before being transported to Australia on the Lady Juliana, which was the first convict ship to carry only women and children. After an 11-month voyage, the ship arrived in Sydney on 3 June 1790. Wade was sent on to Norfolk Island aboard the Lady Juliana, arriving on 7 August 1790.

== Life in Australia ==
Wade had 3 children on Norfolk Island: Sarah in 1793, Edward (born c1795 died c1796) and William (born 1795). When they arrived back in Sydney, Mary lived with Teague Harrigan, with whom she had another two children: Edward (born c1800 died 1803) and Edward (born 1803), in their tent on the banks of the Tank Stream in Sydney. Teague left to go on a whaling expedition in 1806 and, by 1817, he was living in Port Dalrymple, Tasmania. He was granted land near the Tamar River in Launceston in 1825 and, presumably, never returned to the mainland.

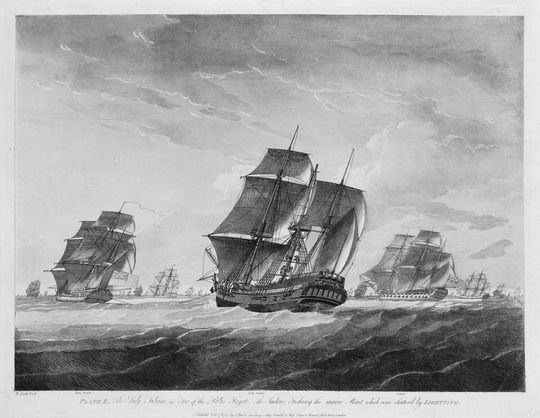
Lady Juliana, which transported Mary to Australia

== Marriage and family ==
From 1809, Wade lived with Jonathan Brooker near the Hawkesbury River. It was there that she raised a family which numbered 21 children (current researchers question this assertion), seven of whom lived to have their own children. Brooker was given a certificate of freedom in February 1811 and was granted 60 acres (24 ha) of land by Governor Lachlan Macquarie, at Tarrawanna, New South Wales. Mary received her certificate of freedom on 1 September 1812. In 1816, the family settled on the property of Airds (comprising the modern suburbs of Airds, Bradbury, St Helens Park and Rosemeadow, among others) in Campbelltown, New South Wales.

Wade married Jonathan Brooker on 10 February 1817 at St Lukes, Liverpool, New South Wales, and her husband owned 30 acres in 1822, but a bushfire burned out the property in 1823. Brooker's livelihood as a chair-maker ended because all his tools were destroyed. The family became destitute and pleaded to Governor Thomas Brisbane for aid. They recovered, with Wade and Brooker owning 62 acres (25 ha) of land in Illawarra by 1828. They lived there until Brookers' death on 14 March 1833. He was buried in the graveyard of St. Peter's Church, Campbelltown. Wade died in Wollongong, New South Wales on 17 December 1859 (her birthday), at the age of 84. Her funeral service was the very first to be held in St Paul's Church of England, Fairy Meadow, New South Wales, with her son having donated the land on which the church was built.

== Legacy ==
At the time of her death, Wade had over 300 living descendants and is considered one of the founding mothers of the early European settlement of Australia. Her descendants now number in the tens of thousands, including Kevin Rudd, former Prime Minister of Australia. Wade's story is told in the book Mary Wade to Us, published as a family tree, noted in the further reading below. That, and the stories of Rudd's other convict ancestors, has been collated into two leather-bound volumes by the Church of Jesus Christ of Latter-day Saints, and is kept in the National Library of Australia in Canberra.

In 2017, the NSW Government named the Mary Wade Correctional Centre, a remand centre for women, in her honour.
