= Hibbs Pyramid =

Island in Tasmania, Australia

- Location within Tasmania
- Etymology: In honour of Peter Hibbs, an English mariner.

Geography
- Location: Indian Ocean
- Coordinates: 42°36′00″S 145°16′12″E
- Area: 4.65 ha (11.5 acres)
- Highest elevation: 73 m (240 ft)

Administration
- Australia
- State: Tasmania
- Region: South West

Demographics
- Population: 0

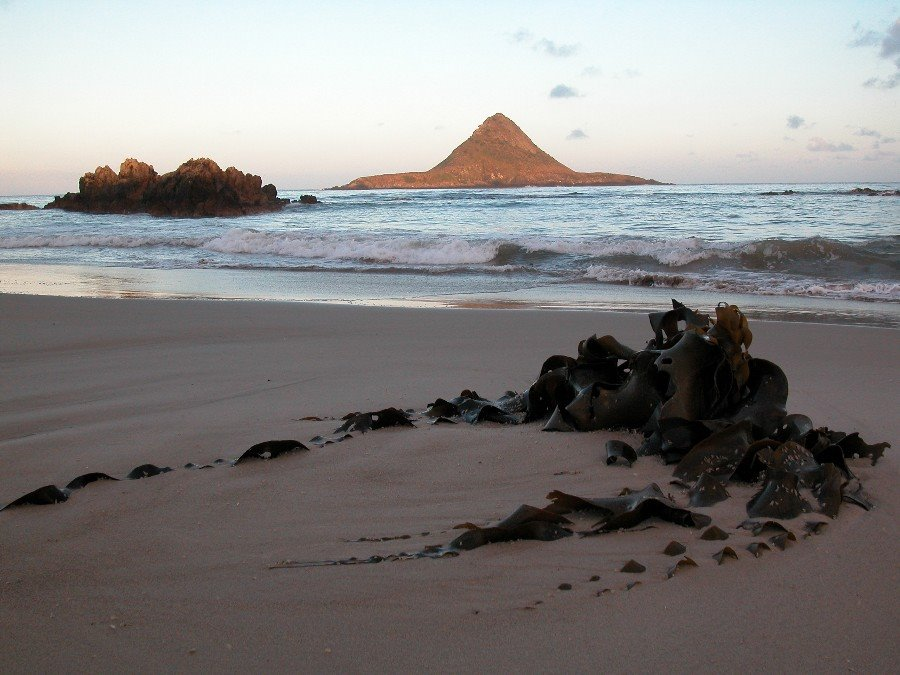

The Hibbs Pyramid is a pyramidal dolerite island, located in the Indian Ocean, off the south western coast of Tasmania, Australia. The island is contained within the Southwest National Park, part of the Tasmanian Wilderness World Heritage Site.

== Features and location ==
With a surface area of 4.65 hectares (11.5 acres), the island is located in Hibbs Bay, adjacent to Point Hibbs at an elevation of 73 metres (240 ft) above sea level. The island is part of the Hibbs Pyramid Group, lying close to the central western coast of Tasmania. The nearest major centre is Strahan, located approximately 50 kilometres (31 mi) to the north.

In early stages of the exploration of the region, the Pyramid Rock was considered a good sheltering location for coastal shipping offloading materials.

== Hibbs Pyramid Group ==
The Hibbs Pyramid group of islands includes:

- Hibbs Pyramid
- Leelinger Island
- Hays Reef
- Black Island
- Montgomery Rocks

== Fauna ==
Recorded breeding seabird and wader species are the little penguin (820 pairs), short-tailed shearwater (9,000 pairs) and sooty oystercatcher. fur seals haul-out on an adjacent rock. Reptiles present include the metallic skink and Tasmanian tree skink.

In 2003 there was a mass stranding of 110 long-finned pilot whales and twenty bottle-nosed dolphins at Hibbs Pyramid. All of the animals died.

== Etymology ==
The island, together with the adjacent Hibbs Bay, Hibbs Lagoon, Hibbs River, and Point Hibbs are named in honour of Peter Hibbs, an English mariner who arrived in the Colony of New South Wales (now Australia) in 1788 aboard HMS Sirius, a ship of the First Fleet. Commanding the Norfolk on a voyage around Tasmania in 1798-99 that carried Matthew Flinders and George Bass, Flinders named a cluster of features on the west coast of Tasmania after Hibbs.

== See also ==
- List of islands of Tasmania
