= John Howell (polyartist) =

Scottish inventor (1788–1863)

- Born: 1788
- Died: 4 April 1863 (aged 74–75)
- Occupations: inventor; bookbinder; author; editor; shopkeeper

John Howell (1788–1863) was a Scottish inventor, who lived in Edinburgh. He was, among other things, a bookbinder, author, editor and shopkeeper. Among his more outlandish endeavours were an attempt to fly and to travel underwater in machines that he designed and built himself (in the former he broke his legs and the latter nearly drowned).

== Biography ==
Howell was born at Old Lauriston, Edinburgh, in 1788, was apprenticed to a bookbinder, but afterwards was an assistant to Robert Kinnear, bookseller, in Frederick Street, Edinburgh, and subsequently spent five years with the firm of Stevenson, printers to the university, where he effected improvements in the art of stereotyping.

Howell then returned to his trade of bookbinding at a workshop in Thistle Street, was patronized by Sir Walter Scott among others, and invented the well-known bookbinding "plough" for cutting the edges of books. Acquainted with many odd handicrafts, he opened a shop as curiosity dealer and china and picture repairer at 22 Frederick Street, where the sign over the door described him as a "polyartist". In the 1830s John Howell, polyartist is listed as living at 67 Thistle Street, in Edinburgh's New Town, close to his shop. The shop was not very successful, and Howell removed his business to 110 Rose Street, where he died 4 April 1863.

== Family ==
Howell was married and left a family.

== Works ==
Howell on one occasion attempted to use a flying machine in what are now the West Princes Street Gardens, but broke one of his legs in the experiment. At another time, having made, at considerable expense, a model in the shape of a fish, he entered the submarine, tried to swim under water at Leith, and was nearly drowned. He was more successful as an amateur doctor and dentist, and introduced the manufacture of Pompeian plates.

Howell's writings show considerable diligence. He published:

1. An Essay on the War-galleys of the Ancients, Edinburgh, 1826, 8vo.
2. The Life and Adventures of Alexander Selkirk, Edinburgh, 1829, 12mo.
3. The Life of Alexander Alexander, Edinburgh, 1830.

He also wrote several of Wilson's Tales of the Borders.

He edited:

- Journal of a Soldier of the 71st Regiment, 1806–1815,
- Life of John Nicol, the Mariner.
