= John Nicol =

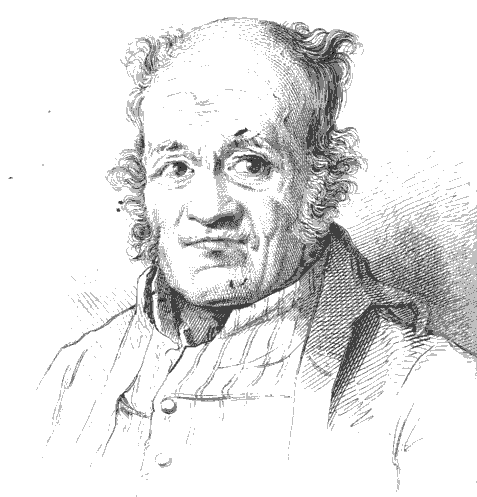
Portrait of John Nicol, the frontispiece of his autobiography

John Nicol (1755 – 1825) was a Scottish sailor who in 1789 sailed on Lady Juliana, a ship that transported convict women to Port Jackson in New South Wales, Australia. His autobiography, published in 1822, offers a rare first-hand account of the life of an ordinary Georgian sailor.

== Life ==
Nicol was born at Currie, near Edinburgh, in Scotland. His father was a cooper, and his mother died in childbirth while Nicol was young. He was apprenticed to a cooper, and in 1776 joined the Royal Navy, serving first on HMS Proteus in the North Atlantic. He then served on HMS Surprise, before being discharged at the conclusion of the American War of Independence in 1783.

In the next few years Nicol sailed in a whaling ship in the waters off Greenland, and sailed to the West Indies and China. He also circumnavigated the globe during this period, doing so twice during his lifetime.

In 1789 he left England on Lady Juliana, which was transporting over 200 female convicts to Australia. It was common practice for crew-members to take a 'wife' from the convicts – Nicol's wife, a convicted shoplifter from Lincoln named Sarah Whitlam, bore him a son during the voyage. They were separated on their arrival at Port Jackson in 1790, and Nicol never saw either again. The day after Nicol's departure, Sarah married John Walsh, a convict of the First Fleet, they both left for India soon after. When Nicol was on his way home from Lisbon, he was told by a Spaniard that the king of France was decapitated but wrote "I understand what he meant but did not believe the information".

In 1794 Nicol was impressed into the Royal Navy, and subsequently fought at the battles of Cape St Vincent and the Nile on HMS Goliath.

After being discharged following the Peace of Amiens, he returned to Scotland, married his cousin, and resumed work as a carpenter. With the resumption of the Napoleonic Wars, Nicol lived in constant fear of being impressed, and thus left Edinburgh for rural Scotland. Eventually he grew too old to be at risk of impressment, and so travelled to London in search of his naval pension, which he was unable to obtain. He returned to Scotland, where he was so poor that he had to pick scraps of coal from the street in order to keep himself warm.

In 1822, Nicol was approached by John Howell, a 'polyartist' whose numerous inventions included a device for trimming the leaves of books, in addition to a flying machine, and a prototype submarine. Howell published five books that detailed the lives of former soldiers or sailors. His method seems to have involved befriending impoverished men and then noting down their stories; Howell assigned all royalties from publication to the subjects themselves.
