= Hays Reef =

Reef in Tasmania, Australia

Coordinates: 42°37′S 145°17′E

Hays Reef is a small, rocky islet in south-eastern Australia. It is part of the Hibbs Pyramid Group, lying close to the central western coast of Tasmania.

== Fauna ==
Recorded breeding seabird and wader species are the Pacific gull and sooty oystercatcher.
