= Justinian (1787 ship) =

British merchant ship 1787–1796

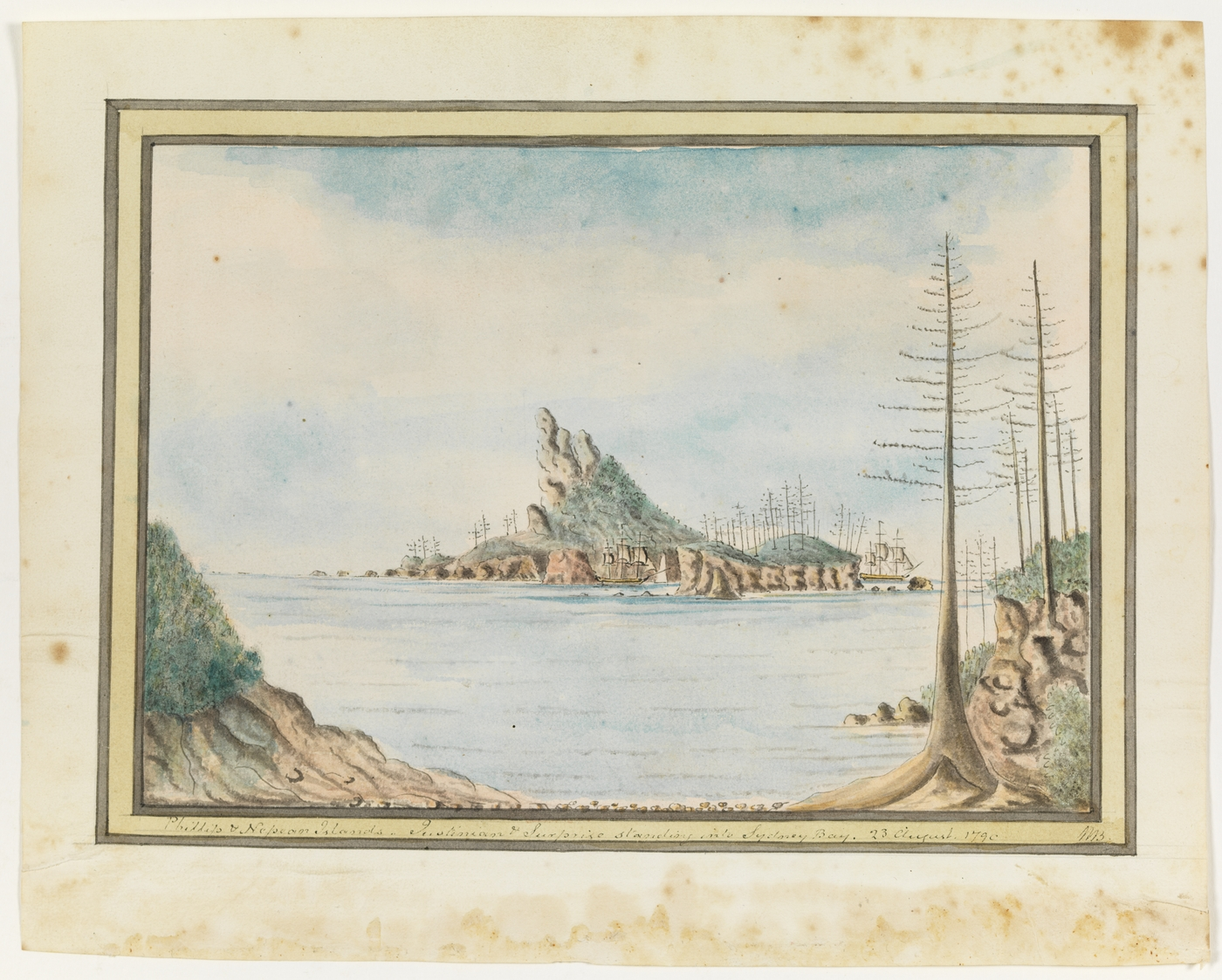
- Justinian and Surprize standing into Sydney Bay, Norfolk Island, 23 August 1790; William Bradley

History

Great Britain
- Name: Justinian
- Owner: Hamilton & Co.
- Builder: Peter Everitt Mestaer, King and Queen Dock, Rotherhithe
- Launched: 14 September 1787
- Fate: Last listed 1796

General characteristics
- Tons burthen: 3755/94, or 401 (bm)
- Length: 86 ft 4 in (26.3 m) (keel)
- Beam: 28 ft 7 in (8.7 m)
- Depth of hold: 12 ft 3 in (3.7 m)
- Propulsion: Sail

Justinian was launched in 1787 at Rotherhithe as a West Indiaman. Between 1789 and 1791 she served as a storeship, carrying provisions to the convict settlement at New South Wales. From there she sailed to China via Norfolk Island. She returned to England from China.

== Career ==
Justinian first appeared in Lloyd's Register (LR) in 1790 with Maitland, master, Hamilton, owner, and trade London–Botany Bay.

=== Transport to NSW and EIC voyage ===
Justinian left England on 29 July 1789 for Jamaica. She arrived there, unloaded her cargo, loaded a cargo of sugar, and returned to England. There the government hired her to carry stores to New South Wales. She had left for Jamaica on the same day that Lady Juliana left for Port Jackson, carrying convicts.

Captain Benjamin Maitland sailed Justinian on 29 December 1789, and she left Falmouth, England, on 20 January 1790, bound for New South Wales and China. After calling at Madeira and St Jago, she arrived at Sydney Cove in Port Jackson on 20 June, having been driven off from the harbour heads on 2 June. She had arrived at the Sydney Heads one day before Lady Juliana and only ill winds had prevented her from entering.

One week after Justinian's arrival, the three ships of the infamous Second Fleet arrived. After unloading, she departed for China on 28 July 1790, to load tea for the EIC for the return journey to Britain.

On the way, Justinian called at Norfolk Island, arriving there on 28 August in company with Surprize.

Justinian arrived at England on 8 October 1791. She then returned to the West Indies trade. She was last listed in Lloyd's Register in 1796.
