= Joseph Backler =

English-born Australian painter

- Born: 24 May 1813; London, England
- Died: 22 October 1895 (aged 82); Sydney, Australia
- Spouses: Margaret Magner (died 1852): Sarah Tincer (until his death)

Joseph Backler (24 May 1813 – 22 October 1895) was an English-born Australian painter. Transported to Australia as a convict in 1832, he obtained a ticket of leave in 1842 and was active as a painter from 1842 to 1880.

== Early life and transportation ==
Joseph Backler, son of Joseph and Jane Backler, was born in London in 1813. His father was also a painter and Backler was apprenticed to him for some time. After his trial on three counts of forgery and passing forged cheques on 30 June 1831, he was convicted of passing forged cheques and sentenced to death. This sentence was commuted to transportation for life.

== Life in Australia ==
Backler arrived in Sydney on board the Portland on 25 May 1832 and was assigned to the Department of Surveyor General Sir Thomas Mitchell. Within a year he was sent to the penal settlement at Port Macquarie as a punishment for further crimes committed in the colony. He spent nine years in Port Macquarie, during which time he received further punishment for misbehaviour but also had an opportunity to paint at least six landscape paintings of Port Macquarie. Backler obtained a ticket of leave in 1842 and shortly afterwards was married to Margaret Magner.

In 1843, Backler obtained permission to move to Sydney on the condition that he remained in the employment of Messrs Cetta & Hughes, frame makers, carvers and gilders with an office on George Street. He remained in Sydney until August 1845, when he travelled to Goulburn (almost one year before being granted official approval to live and work outside Sydney). During the late 1840s he also travelled to Yass, Bathurst, Maitland and Newcastle painting portraits and landscapes, activities which he claimed during his insolvency proceedings in 1849 had caused him financial hardship. He continued to travel around New South Wales and Queensland for much of his career as a painter. In 1868 Backler had a dispute with Kehlet over payment for some portraits. Following the death of his first wife Margaret in 1852, he married Sarah Tincer (possibly within a year of Margaret's death).

By 1882 Backler had returned to Sydney, where he worked as a portrait painter and based his work on photography. He died in October 1895 and was buried at Waverley Cemetery. He was survived by his second wife Sarah.

== As a painter ==
Backler's portraits were all in oil. His style of composition, with a focus on the detail of costume and realistic depiction of his subjects (sometimes unflattering), owed its genesis to the flourishing genre of provincial English portraiture. Backler's portraits are similar in style to the kinds of portraits which similar families in similar social positions in England – the successful working classes or lower middle classes – could have commissioned from local English portrait painters. He was not very involved in the Sydney art scene.

=== Landscapes ===
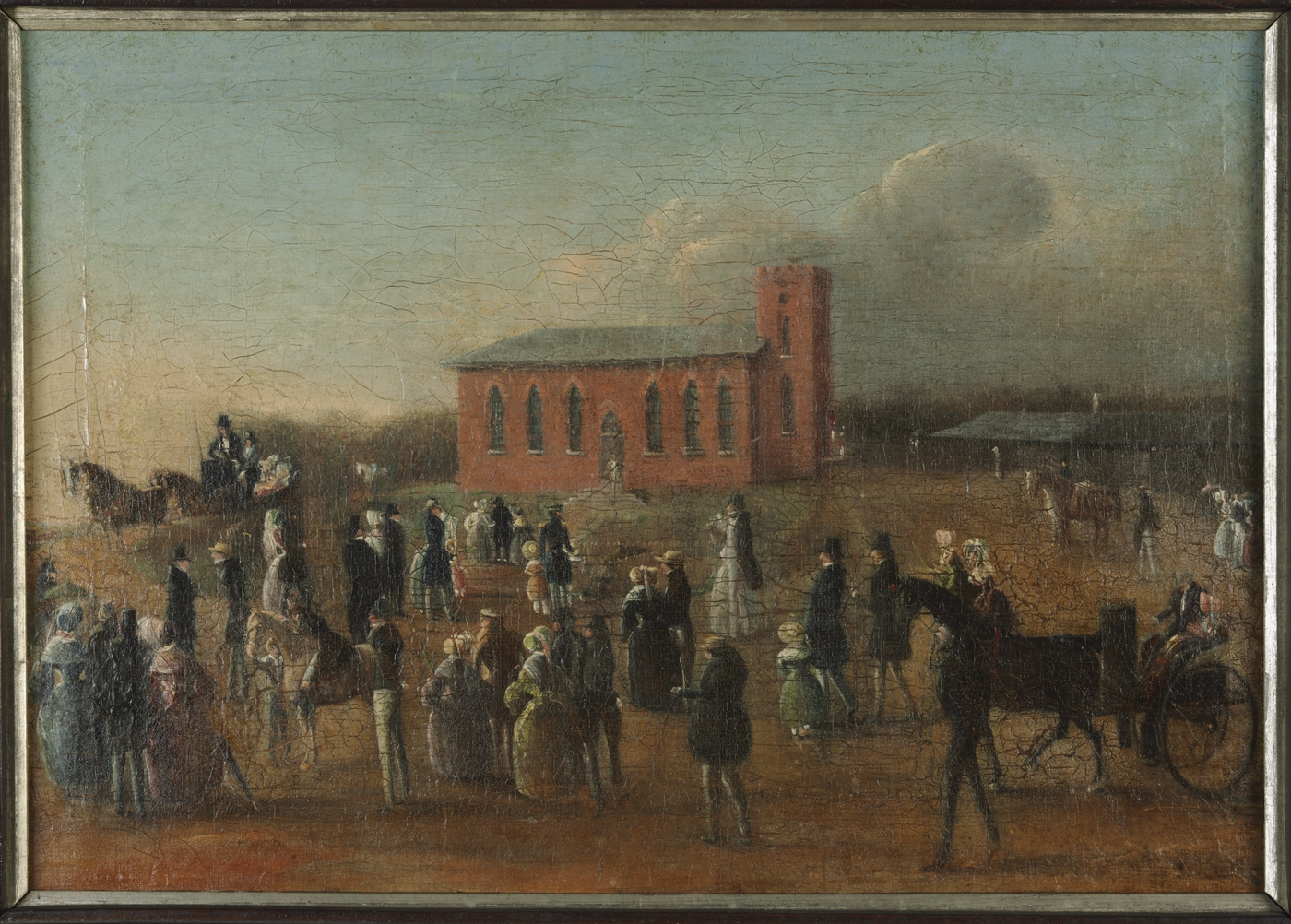
St. Thomas' Church, Port Macquarie, New South Wales c.1832–1842

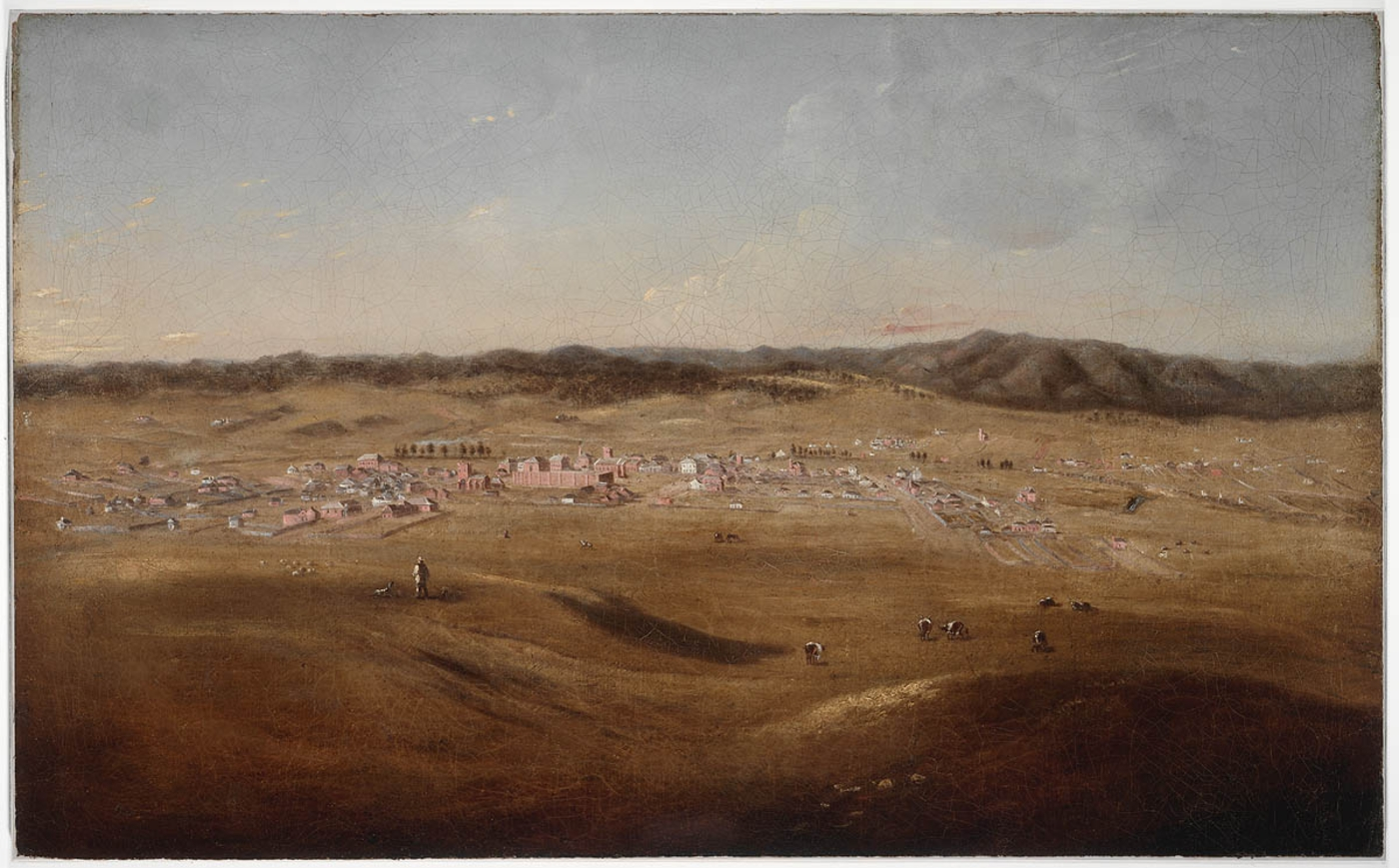
Bathurst, New South Wales c.1847–1857

=== Portraits ===
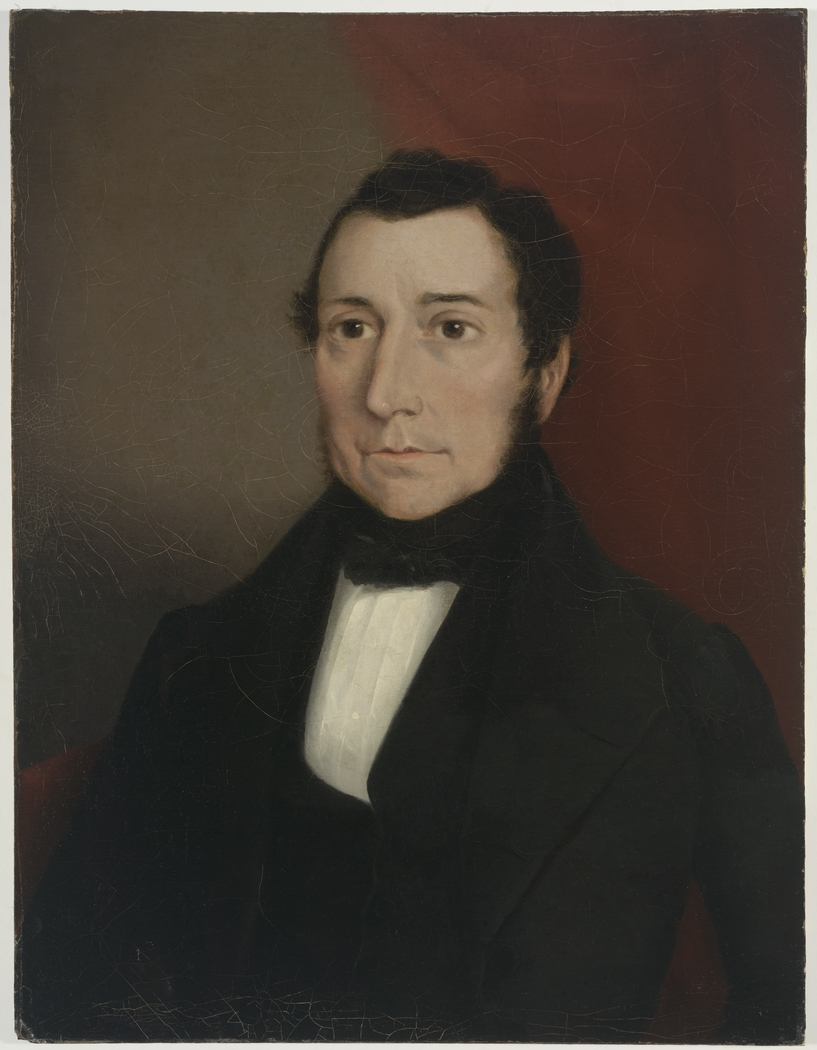
James Dunlop
(1843)

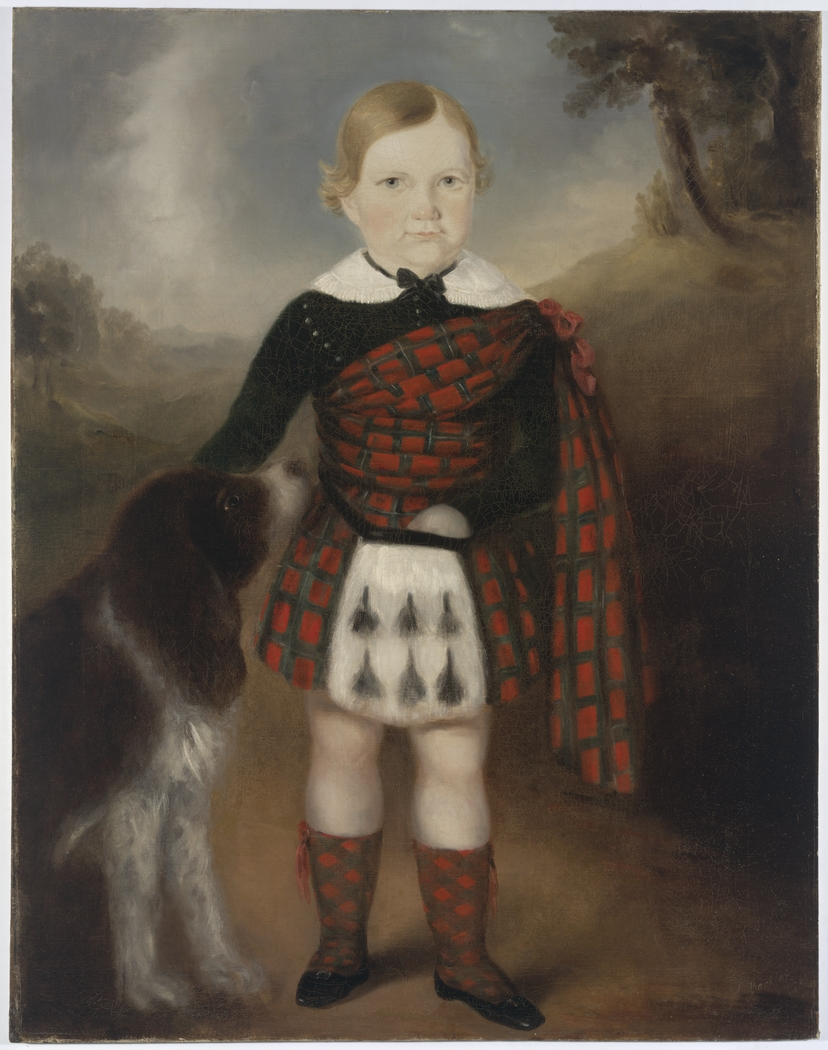
Alexander Sinclair
(1846)

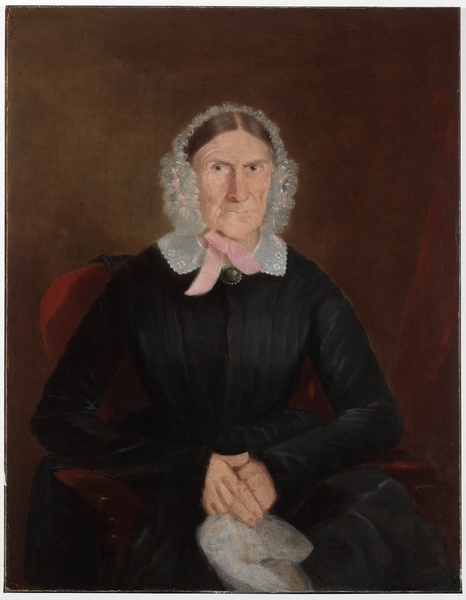
Sarah Cobcroft
(1856)

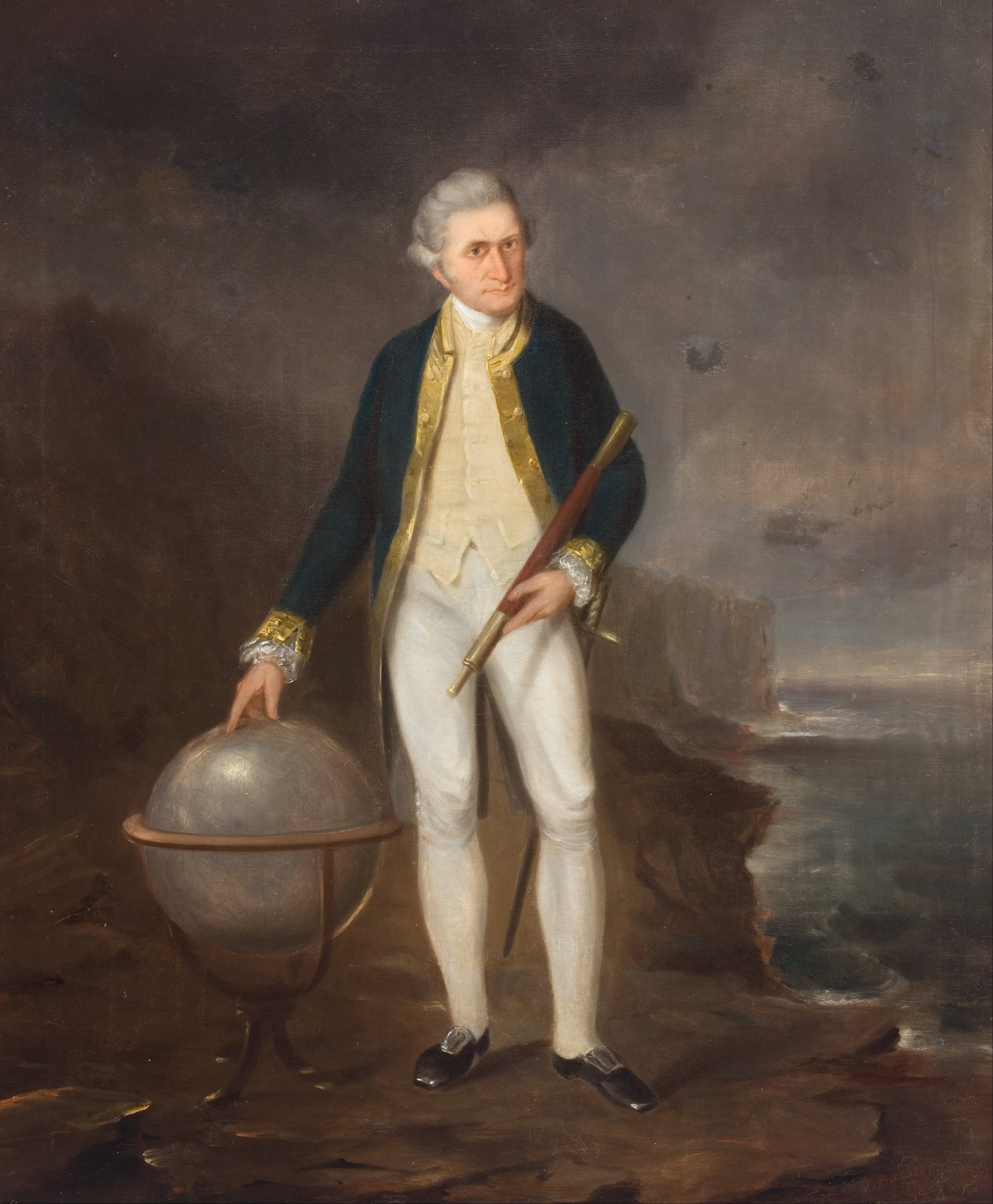
Captain James Cook
(1860)

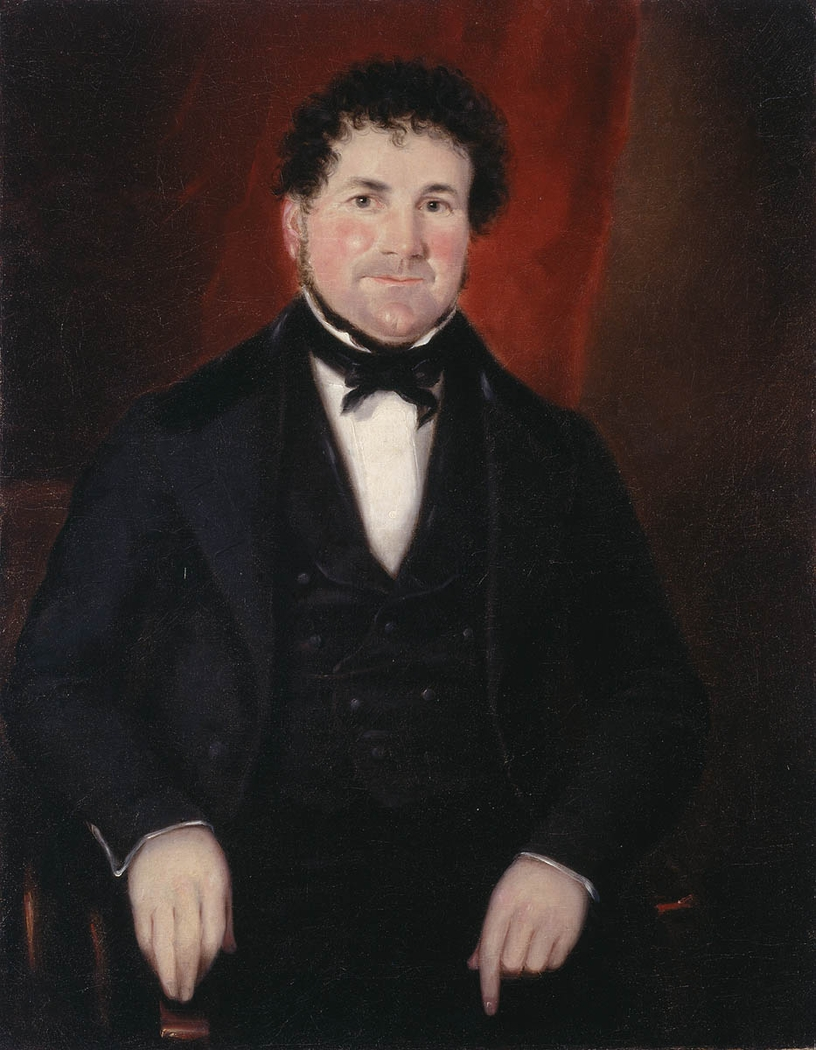
James Richard Styles
(date unknown)

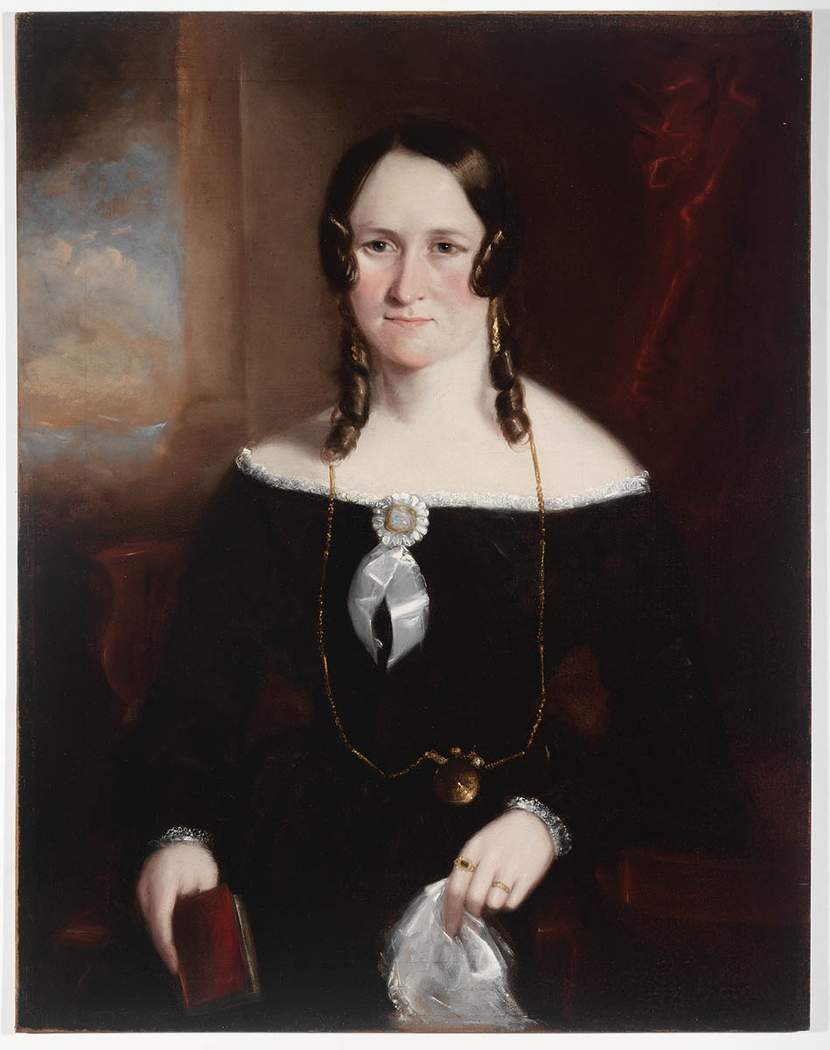
Christina Sinclair
(date unknown)

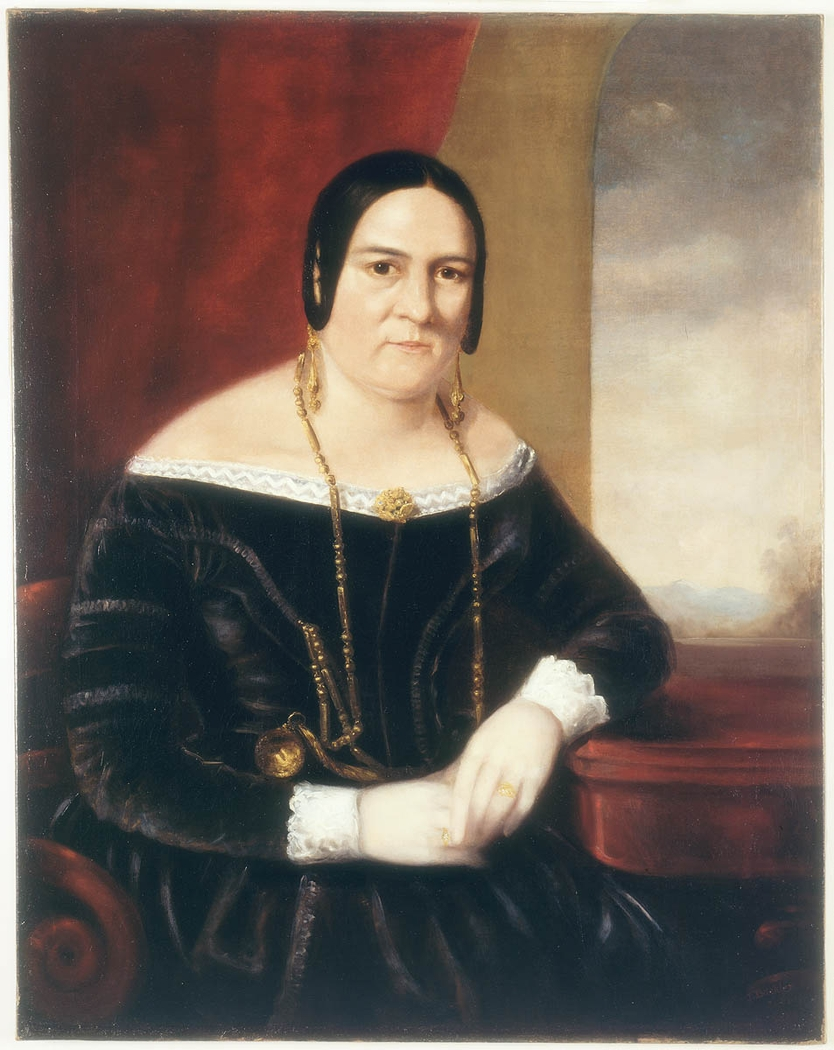
Hannah Watson
(date unknown)

== See also ==
- List of convicts transported to Australia
