= Leelinger Island =

Island in Tasmania, Australia

Coordinates: 42°38′S 145°17′E

Leelinger Island is a flat dolerite island with an area of 1.54 ha in south-eastern Australia. It is part of the Hibbs Pyramid Group, lying close to the central western coast of Tasmania.

== Fauna ==
Recorded breeding seabird and wader species are the little penguin (400 pairs), short-tailed shearwater (6000 pairs), Pacific gull and sooty oystercatcher.
