= Lady Juliana (1777 ship) =

Convict ship to Australia in 1789

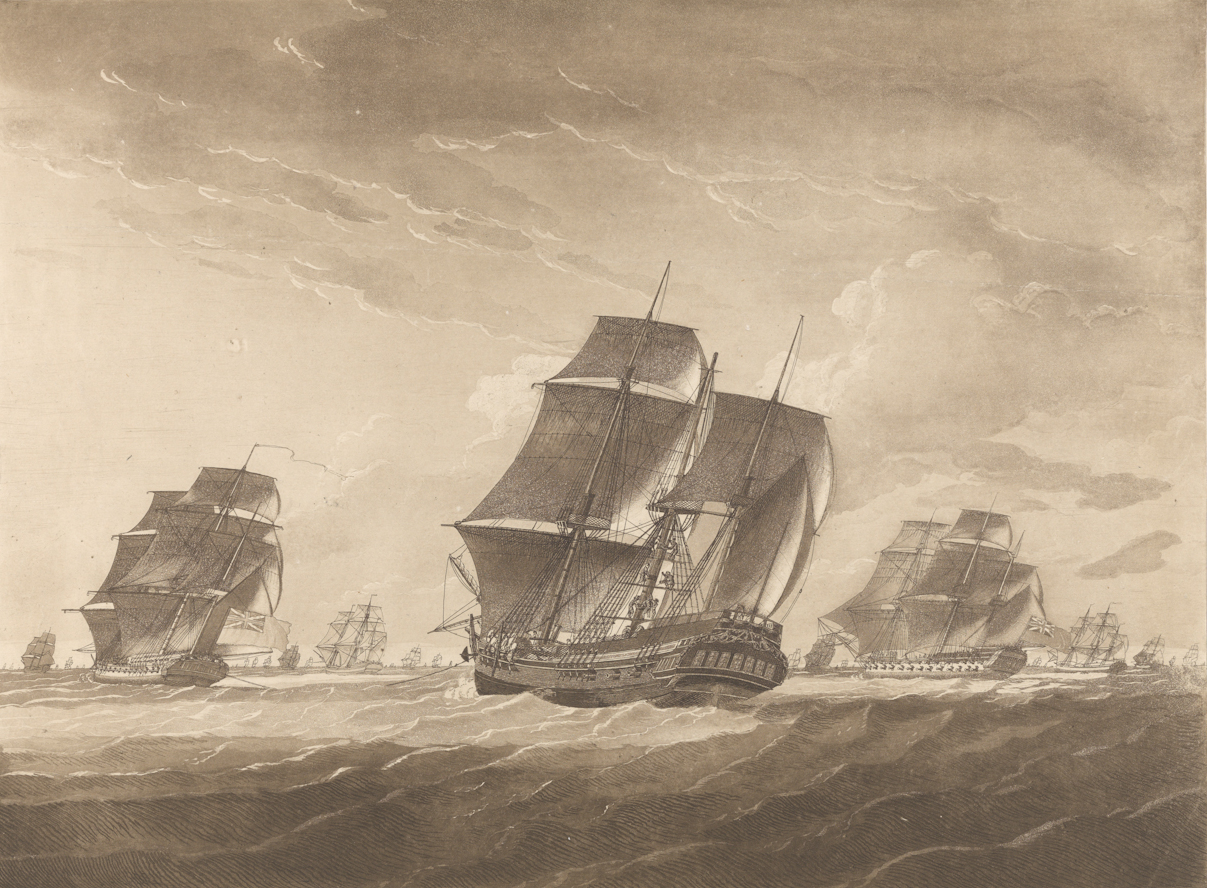
- Robert Dodd: Lady Juliana in tow of the Pallas Frigate. The Sailors Fishing the main Mast which was shatter'd by Lightning.

History

Great Britain
- Name: Lady Juliana
- Builder: Stephenson & Co, Whitby
- Launched: 1777, or 1778
- Fate: Last listed in Lloyd's Register in 1829.

General characteristics
- Class & type: Barque
- Tons burthen: 379, or 380, or 401, or 500 (bm)
- Length: 110 feet
- Beam: 40 feet
- Armament: 20 × 6-pounder guns
- Notes: Three masts and two decks

Lady Juliana (also known as the Lady Julian), was launched at Whitby in 1777. She transported convicts in 1789 from England to Australia.

== Career ==
The British government chartered Lady Juliana to transport female convicts. The government agent on board the ship was Lieutenant Thomas Edgar, who had sailed with James Cook on his last voyage. The surgeon was Richard Alley, who was apparently competent by the standards of the day, but made little attempt to maintain discipline. After a delay of six months Lady Juliana left Plymouth on 29 July 1789, and arrived at Port Jackson on 6 June 1790. She took 309 days to reach Port Jackson, one of the slowest journeys made by a convict ship. One reason was that she called at Tenerife and St Jago, and spent forty-five days at Rio de Janeiro, and nineteen days at the Cape of Good Hope. She carried 226 female convicts, five of whom died during the journey.

Her steward, John Nicol, wrote an account of the voyage and the convicts. Most of these were London prostitutes, but there were thieves, receivers of stolen goods and shoplifters among them.

Lady Juliana gained the reputation for being a floating brothel. Nicol recalled that "when we were fairly out to sea, every man on board took a wife from among the convicts, they nothing loath." At the ports of call seamen from other ships were freely entertained, and the officers made no attempt to suppress this licentious activity. No provision had been made to set the convicts to any productive work during the voyage, and they were reported to be noisy and unruly, with a fondness for liquor and for fighting amongst themselves.

The low death rate during the voyage was due to Edgar and Alley's care. Rations were properly issued, the vessel kept clean and fumigated, the women were given free access to the deck, and supplies of fresh food were obtained at the ports of call. This treatment was in sharp contrast to that meted out on the infamous Second Fleet.

When Lady Juliana arrived at Port Jackson she was the first vessel to arrive at Port Jackson since the First Fleet's arrival almost two and a half years before. With the colony in the grip of starvation, and with HMS Sirius having been wrecked at Norfolk Island, Judge Advocate David Collins was mortified at the arrival of "a cargo so unnecessary and so unprofitable as 222 females, instead of a cargo of provisions". Lieutenant Ralph Clark was more blunt, lamenting the arrival of still more "damned whores". The ship carried letters bringing the first news of events in Europe to the settlement since the First Fleet had sailed in May 1787. Two weeks later the storeship Justinian arrived, followed a week later by the three ships of the Second Fleet with their shameful cargo of starved and maltreated convicts. Because Lady Juliana was the first ship to arrive after the First Fleet, some consider her part of the Second Fleet, but some do not. A transportation register can be seen at the UK National Archives.

After repairs to her strained timbers, Lady Juliana sailed for China on 25 July 1790 to take on a cargo of tea for the East India Company. She arrived in England on 26 October 1791.

== Fate ==
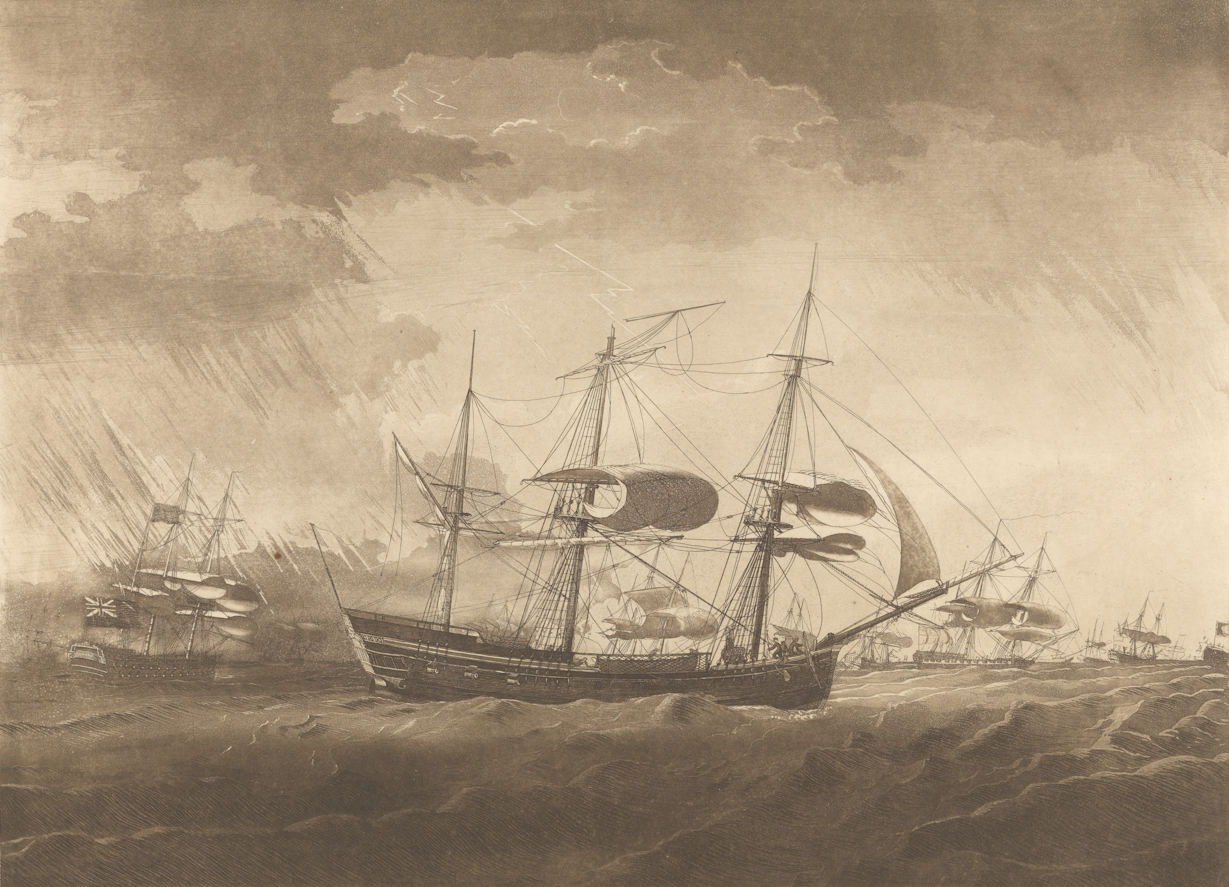
Lady Juliana struck by Lightning in the Gulf of Mexico

Lady Juliana was last listed in Lloyd's Register in 1829 trading with the Baltic. She was last listed in the Register of Shipping in 1832 with Smith, master, J. Henly, owner, and trade Belfast—Quebec.

== Notable convicts aboard Lady Juliana ==
- Mary Wade - Mary was transported at 13 years of age, and at the time of her death at age 84, had about 150 living descendants.
- Elizabeth Steel - Elizabeth is historically recorded as the first deaf Australian. Her headstone was discovered in 1991.
- Mary Pardoe - Mary gave birth to Ann (fathered by Edward Scott, sailor aboard Lady Juliana) in March 1790 while making the journey to Australia. This child was the youngest person on board Lady Juliana when she arrived at Port Jackson.
- Elizabeth Parry - Elizabeth was the first female convict emancipated. She married first fleet convict, and farmer James Ruse. Together they grew the first successful crop.
- Sarah Dorset - gave birth to a son named Edward Powell on the voyage to Australia. The father, also Edward Powell, was a crew member. Upon arrival in Sydney, Sarah was sent to Norfolk Island where she had two children with Robert Watson. In 1801 Watson was granted a lease at South Head in the area that was named Watsons Bay.
