= Black Island (Tasmania) =

Islet in Tasmania, Australia

Coordinates: 42°58′S 145°29′E

Black Island is a jagged and rocky islet in south-eastern Australia. It is part of the Hibbs Pyramid Group, lying close to the central western coast of Tasmania.

== Flora and fauna ==
The only vegetation comprises a few small patches of Senecio sp. at the north-western end.
