= Recovery (1816 ship) =

Sloop Ship

History

United Kingdom
- Name: Recovery
- Owner: Peter Hibbs
- Fate: Wrecked in June 1816

General characteristics
- Class & type: Sloop
- Tons burthen: 14(bm)
- Sail plan: Sloop rig

Recovery was a sloop that was wrecked near Port Stephens, New South Wales, Australia in 1816.

Peter Hibbs was Recovery's owner. In early June 1816 Recovery headed from Hawkesbury to Port Jackson with a cargo of grain when a storm came up that blew Recovery out to sea. On turning the ship around it was wrecked near Port Stephens. The crew of two men, and a woman passenger, struggled ashore and walked 50 miles to Newcastle. On the way some aborigines stripped them of all their clothes. At Newcastle they were given passage to Sydney on the sloop, Windsor which was also wrecked.
