= Mary Wade Correctional Centre =

Prison in Australia

- Location: Lidcombe, New South Wales, Australia
- Status: Open
- Security class: Remand
- Capacity: 94
- Opened: 17 November 2017
- Former name: Juniperina Juvenile Justice Centre
- Managed by: Corrective Services NSW
- Governor: Paula Quarrie

Mary Wade Correctional Centre is a minimum-security works release centre for women. Mary Wade Correctional Centre is located in Lidcombe, 19km west of Sydney central business district, operated by Corrective Services NSW, an agency of the New South Wales state government. The centre was named for Mary Wade, a convict transported to colonial NSW in 1790.

The site, on Joseph Street in the suburb of Lidcombe, was previously home to the Minda and later Juniperina juvenile detention centres. In 2016, the site was transferred to Corrective Services and converted to a remand prison for women, reducing pressure on the existing Silverwater Women's Correctional Centre.

Mary Wade Correctional Centre has a capacity of 94.
