= Montgomery Rocks =

Island in Tasmania, Australia

Coordinates: 42°46′S 145°22′E

Montgomery Rocks comprises a pair of rocky dolerite and limestone islets, with a combined area of 3.69 ha and a high point of 50 m, part of the Hibbs Pyramid Group, lying close to the central western coast of Tasmania.

== Fauna ==
Recorded breeding seabird and wader species are the little penguin (60 pairs), short-tailed shearwater (560 pairs), fairy prion (760 pairs), common diving-petrel (100 pairs), Pacific gull and sooty oystercatcher. The metallic skink is present.
