= Sarah Cobcroft =

Australian midwife (1772–1857)

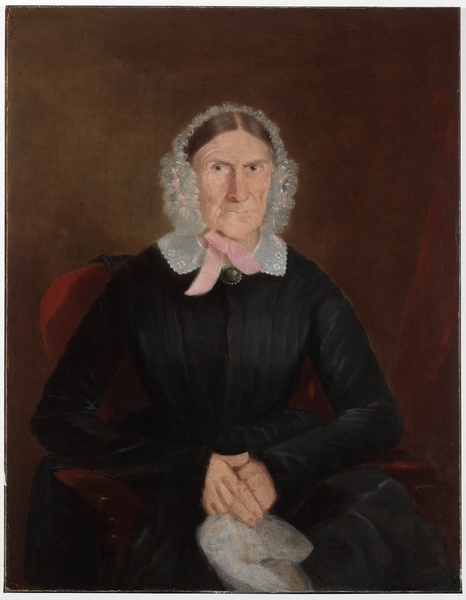
Sarah Cobcroft painted by Joseph Backler in 1856

Sarah Cobcroft (1772 – 1857) was an English-born midwife, farmer, and early settler of Australia. She emigrated to the Colony of New South Wales in 1790 aboard the Neptune, part of the notorious Second Fleet. Throughout her life, she made significant contributions to the Wilberforce district as a midwife, supporting both convict and free women during a time when formal medical care was scarce. Her life reflects the hardships and resilience of women in the early colonial era.

== Biography ==
=== Early Life and Migration ===
Sarah Cobcroft (née Smith), born in 1772 in Holborn, London, was one of a small group of women and their children who embarked on Neptune in late 1789. They had accepted a government offer of a free passage to the colony for the wives or de facto partners of convicts on the second fleet. Cobcroft was the common law wife of John Cobcroft (1763–1853), who had been sentenced to life in the Colony, along with John Wood and William Fielder, for assault and highway robbery. They did not marry until 24 December 1842 at the Macquarie Schoolhouse in Wilberforce, New South Wales, when John was 79 and she was 70.

Some publications have incorrectly identified her as a female convict of the same name who arrived on Neptune; Cobcroft stated in her 1825 memorial that she had come free to the colony together with six other females sent out by Government to practice midwifery per ship Neptune as part of the Second Fleet to arrive in the Colony of New South Wales. It seems almost certain that she embarked as John Cobcroft's de facto wife. Two of the other women who embarked on Neptune were legally married to John Wood and William Fielder, who had been convicted with John Cobcroft for crimes of highway robbery.

=== Life in New South Wales ===
Upon arrival, John Cobcroft received a conditional pardon in 1794 and a land grant of 30 acres at Wilberforce in 1795. Sarah and John formalized their marriage much later, on 24 December 1842, at the Macquarie Schoolhouse in Wilberforce, when John was 79 and Sarah was 70.

The couple had ten children:

- Richard William (1793)
- Elizabeth (1795)
- John Frederick (1797)
- Sarah (1799)
- Mary Ann (1801)
- Susannah (1805)
- James (1807)
- George (1810)
- Eliza (1812)
- Matilda (1813)

Through hard work and land acquisition, they expanded their holdings to 485 acres by 1828, becoming prominent figures in the Hawkesbury region.

=== Work as a Midwife ===
Throughout her working life, Sarah served as a midwife in the Wilberforce district, delivering the children of convict women and settlers, often without charge. In an era when trained medical personnel were rare and childbirth carried significant risks, Sarah's services were vital to the survival and growth of the community. Midwifery was one of the few respected professions open to women at the time, and Sarah's role as a government-sanctioned midwife highlights her importance.

Although records are scarce, midwives like Sarah often learned their skills through apprenticeships or were selected based on prior experience rather than formal training. The conditions of childbirth in the early colony were harsh, with few supplies and high maternal and infant mortality rates, making her work essential.

=== Legacy ===
A portrait of Sarah Cobcroft painted by Joseph Backler in 1856 captures her in old age as a strong and determined matriarch. She died on 31 May 1857, aged 85, and was buried alongside her husband in the family vault at Wilberforce Cemetery.

Sarah Cobcroft's life story corrects misconceptions about the women of the Second Fleet and sheds light on the vital role that free women played in supporting convict society through caregiving professions. Her contribution as a midwife and matriarch helped lay the foundations for the Wilberforce community.
