= Windsor (sloop) =

Ship wrecked on Long Reef near Sydney, Australia in 1816

History

Australia
- Owner: Henry Major
- Fate: Wrecked 1816

General characteristics
- Sail plan: sloop

Windsor was a ship wrecked on Long Reef near Sydney, Australia in 1816.

Windsor was a sloop of 22 tons owned and under the command of Henry Major. Windsor left the Hawkesbury and headed for Sydney when she was blown well off shore by a gale. It is probable that it was this gale that ended up sinking Recovery the same month. Eventually Windsor reached Newcastle where she picked up Recovery's survivors. Coming into Sydney the ship was wrecked on Long Reef but all of Windsor's crew and Recovery's survivors were able to get to safety and walk to Sydney.
