= Cessnock Eagle and South Maitland Recorder =

Former newspaper in New South Wales, Australia

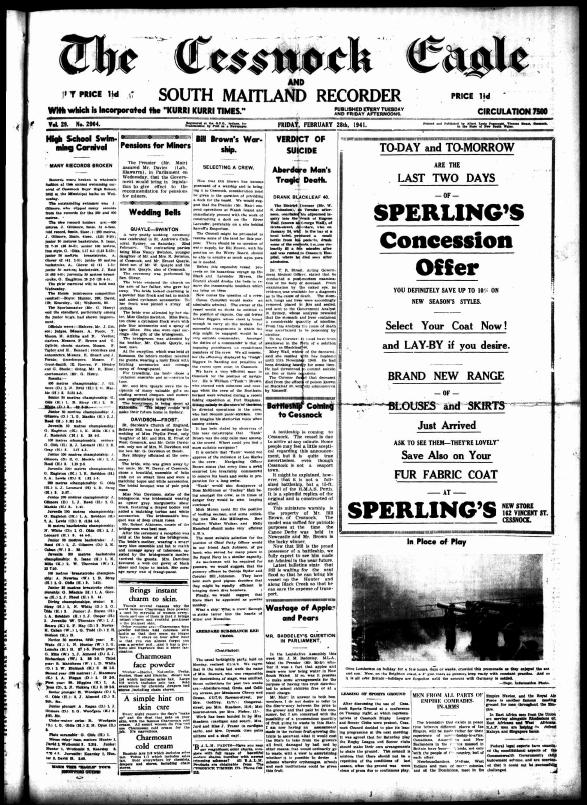
The Cessnock Eagle and South Maitland Recorder, 28 February 1941

The Cessnock Eagle and South Maitland Recorder (later published as the Cessnock Eagle) was a semiweekly English language newspaper published in Cessnock, New South Wales, Australia from 1913 to 1978.

== History ==
First published on 21 November 1913, the last edition of the Cessnock Eagle and South Maitland Recorder was published in 1961. The paper was then published from 1961 to 1978 as the Cessnock Eagle.

== Digitisation ==
The Cessnock Eagle and South Maitland Recorder has been digitised as part of the Australian Newspapers Digitisation Program project of the National Library of Australia.

== See also ==
- List of newspapers in Australia
- List of newspapers in New South Wales
