= Second Fleet (Australia) =

Fleet of British convicts vessels bound for Australia

The Second Fleet was a convoy of six ships carrying settlers, convicts and supplies to Sydney Cove, Australia in 1790. It followed the First Fleet which established European settlement in Australia on 26 January 1788.

The Second Fleet has achieved a historical notoriety for the poor conditions aboard the vessels, and for cruelty and mistreatment of its convicts. Of the 1,006 convicts transported aboard the Fleet, one quarter died during the voyage and around 40 per cent were dead within six months of arrival in Australia. The captain and some crew members of one vessel were charged with offences against the convicts, but acquitted after a short trial.

The ships were supposed to travel together to Australia, arriving in Sydney Cove in 1789. However, one was disabled en route and failed to make the destination, while another was delayed and arrived two months after the other ships. The colony had expected that the Fleet would contain fewer unskilled convicts and more supplies: the arrival of so many sick and dying and so few additional provisions brought the settlement close to starvation before the Third Fleet reached Sydney Cove in 1791.

== Fleet summary ==
Ship	Image	Type	Master	Crew	Dep. England	Arr. Sydney	Duration	Male convicts arrived (boarded)	Female convicts arrived (boarded)
Lady Juliana		convict transport	Thomas Edgar	35	29 July 1789	3 June 1790	309 days	n/a	222 (226)
Guardian		converted Roebuck class warship to convict transport	Edward Riou		12 September 1789	disabled en route	n/a	20 (25) – see below	n/a
Justinian		storeship			20 January 1790	20 June 1790	151 days		
Surprize		converted merchant ship to convict transport	Nicholas Anstis		19 January 1790	26 June 1790	158 days	218 (254)	n/a
Neptune		convict transport	Donald Trail		19 January 1790	27 June 1790	159 days	? (421) + 12 from Guardian	? (78)
Scarborough		converted transport to convict ship	John Marshall		19 January 1790	28 June 1790	160 days	180 (253) + 8 from Guardian	n/a
TOTAL								859 [114] (973)	300 [4] (304)

== Origins and history ==
Lady Juliana sailed before the other convict ships and is not always counted as a member of the Second Fleet. It carried female convicts. The storeship Justinian did not sail with the convict ships and arrived before them (excepting Lady Juliana). HMS Guardian set out before the convict ships but struck ice after leaving the Cape of Good Hope, returned to southern Africa, and was wrecked on the coast.

Surprize, Neptune, and Scarborough were contracted from the firm Camden, Calvert & King, which undertook to transport, clothe and feed the convicts for a flat fee of £17 7s 6d, or £17.38 (equivalent to £2,623 in 2023) per head, whether they landed alive or not. This firm had previously been involved in transporting slaves to North America. The only agents of the Crown in the crew were the naval agent, Lieutenant John Shapcote, and the Captain of the Guard; Camden and Calvert supplied all other crew..

The three vessels left England on 19 January 1790, with 1,006 convicts (928 male and 78 female) on board. They made only one stop on the way, at the Cape of Good Hope. Here 20 male convicts, survivors from HMS Guardian, were taken on board. The three vessels made a faster trip than the First Fleet, arriving at Port Jackson in the last week of June 1790, three weeks after Lady Juliana, and one week after the storeship Justinian.

The passage was relatively fast, but the mortality rate was the highest in the history of transportation to Australia. Of the 1,038 convicts embarked, 273 died during the voyage (26%) and 486 (47% of those embarked) landed sick. This sits in stark contrast to the mortality rates reported on the First Fleet where "with nearly an equal number of persons, only 24 had died and not thirty landed sick. The difference can be accounted for only by comparing the manner in which each fleet was fitted out and conducted."

On Neptune the convicts were deliberately starved, kept chained, and frequently refused access to the deck. Scurvy could not be checked. On Scarborough, rations were not deliberately withheld, but a reported mutiny attempt led to the convicts being closely confined below decks.

Captain William Hill, commander of the guard, afterwards wrote a strong criticism of the ships' masters stating that "the more they can withhold from the unhappy wretches the more provisions they have to dispose of at a foreign market, and the earlier in the voyage they die, the longer they can draw the deceased's allowance to themselves".

== Arrival at Port Jackson ==
On arrival at Port Jackson, half-naked convicts were lying without bedding, too ill to move. Those unable to walk were slung over the side. All were covered with lice. At least 486 sick were landed. Of these, 124 died shortly after they had landed. Of the rest the Rev. Johnson, who went among them as soon as the ships reached port, wrote that "the misery I saw amongst them is indescribable ... their heads, bodies, clothes, blankets, were all full of lice. They were wretched, naked, filthy, dirty, lousy, and many of them utterly unable to stand, to creep, or even to stir hand or foot."

For his part Governor Phillip noted, "I will not, sir, dwell on the scene of misery which the hospitals and sick tents exhibited when these people were landed, but it would be want of duty not to say that it was occasioned by the contractors having crowded too many on board these ships, and from their being too much confined during the passage."

Among the arrivals on the Second Fleet were D'Arcy Wentworth and his convict mistress Catherine Crowley, on Neptune, and John Macarthur, then a young lieutenant in the New South Wales Corps, and his wife Elizabeth, on Scarborough. Macarthur's eldest son, Edward Macarthur, who accompanied his parents on the Neptune and Scarborough, is believed to be the only person who sailed in the Second Fleet of whom we have a photograph as well as being the last survivor of the voyage (see reference below).

When news of the horrors of the Second Fleet reached England, public and official response was shock. An enquiry was held but no attempt was made to arrest Donald Trail (alternative: Traill), master of Neptune and described as a demented sadist, or bring a public prosecution against him, the other masters, or the firm of contractors. They had already been contracted by the government to prepare the Third Fleet for sailing to Port Jackson in 1791.

Traill and his Chief Mate William Ellerington were privately prosecuted for the murder of an unnamed convict, seaman Andrew Anderson and John Joseph, cook. But, after a trial lasting three hours before Sir James Marriott in the Admiralty Court, the jury acquitted both men on all charges "without troubling the Judge to sum up the evidence".

== See also ==
- History of Australia

== Bibliography ==
- Collins, David (1975). Fletcher, Brian H. (ed.). An Account of the English Colony in New South Wales. A.H. & A.W. Reed. ISBN 0589071688.
- Flynn, Michael (1993). The Second Fleet: Britain's Grim Convict Armada of 1790. Sydney: Library of Australian History. ISBN 0908120834.
