= 1853 in Australia =

- Decades: 1830s; 1840s; 1850s; 1860s; 1870s
- See also: Other events of 1853; Timeline of Australian history

The following lists events that happened during 1853 in Australia.

== Incumbents ==
- Monarch - Victoria

=== Governors ===
Governors of the Australian colonies:

- Governor of New South Wales - Sir Charles Augustus FitzRoy
- Governor of South Australia - Sir Henry Young
- Governor of Tasmania - Sir William Denison
- Lieutenant-Governor of Victoria - Charles La Trobe
- Governor of Western Australia as a Crown Colony - Captain Charles Fitzgerald

== Events ==
This was a year of intense political agitation by miners on the Victorian goldfields.

- 8 January - Victoria Police formally established by Act of Parliament
- 22 January - University of Melbourne formally established by Act of Parliament
- 17 March - St Kilda Road robberies
- 6 June - The Anti-Gold Licence Association, was formed in Bendigo,
- 1 August - The Bendigo Petition, 30 metres long with at least 23,000 signatures requesting reform of the license fee system that applied to miners on the gold fields, was sent to Governor La Trobe in Melbourne.
- 10 August - A Jubilee Festival was held in Hobart to mark the cessation of convict transportation to the colony.
- 12 August - sailing ship Madagascar left Melbourne for London with two tonnes of gold and disappeared.
- 15 August - the term Bunyip aristocracy was coined by Daniel Deniehy in a speech attacking the proposal by William Wentworth to create a system of hereditary peerage in Australia
- 3 October - Illawarra Steam Navigation Company incorporated
- 1 November - The first postage stamps of Tasmania are issued.
- December - Victoria Police Gazette first published
- Undated - between 30 and 40 Bundjalung people, including men, women and children were killed as they slept by the Native Police in the East Ballina massacre.
- Hardy Wine Company established

== Exploration and settlement ==
- European settlement began at:
- Cleve, South Australia
- Dongara, Western Australia
- Nailsworth, South Australia

== Science and technology ==
- 10 January - the Adelaide Philosophical Society founded, predecessor of the Royal Society of South Australia
- National Herbarium of New South Wales established
- National Herbarium of Victoria established

== Art and Literature ==
- Bendigo Advertiser & Sandhurst Commercial Circular established

== Sport ==
- 23 September - occupancy of the present site of the Melbourne Cricket Ground, which was part of a 'police paddock', was given to the Melbourne Cricket Club by Lieutenant Governor Charles La Trobe. This followed the forced resumption of land from the then-15-year-old Club to build Australia's first steam train railway.

== Births ==
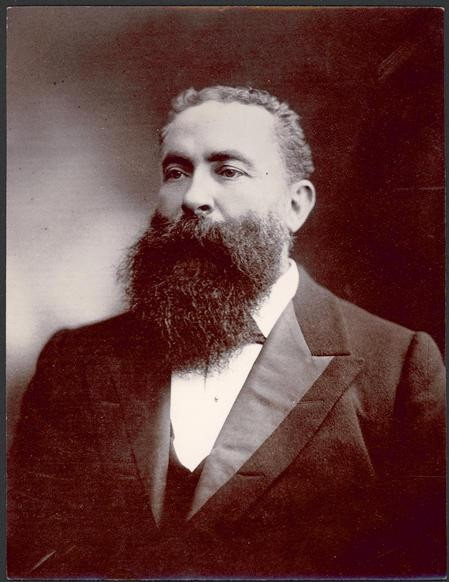
Vaiben Louis Solomon

- 1 February – George Cruickshank, New South Wales politician (d. 1904)
- 18 February – Archibald James Campbell, public servant, ornithologist and naturalist (d. 1929)
- 13 May – Vaiben Louis Solomon, 21st Premier of South Australia (d. 1908)
- 7 July – Charles Douglas Richardson, sculpture and painter (born in the United Kingdom) (d. 1932)
- 30 July – Frederick Deeming, murderer (born in the United Kingdom) (d. 1892)
- 8 August – Alexander Poynton, South Australian politician (d. 1935)
- 9 September – Frederick Spofforth, cricketer (d. 1926)
- 5 October – Leonard Rodway, dentist and botanist (born in the United Kingdom) (d. 1936)

== Deaths ==
- 1 January – Gregory Blaxland, farmer and explorer (born in the United Kingdom) (b. 1778)
- 20 February – William Broughton, bishop (born and died in the United Kingdom) (b. 1788)
- 11 June – Francis Barrallier, explorer (born in France and died in the United Kingdom) (b. 1773)
- 3 November – Daniel Cooper, merchant, financier and shipowner (born and died in the United Kingdom) (b. 1785)
