= 1847 in Australia =

- Decades: 1820s; 1830s; 1840s; 1850s; 1860s
- See also: Other events of 1847; Timeline of Australian history

The following lists events that happened during 1847 in Australia.

== Incumbents ==
- Monarch - Victoria

=== Governors ===
Governors of the Australian colonies:

- Governor of South Australia - Lieutenant Colonel Frederick Holt Robe
- Governor of Tasmania - Sir William Denison
- Governor of Western Australia as a Crown Colony - Lieutenant-Colonel Andrew Clarke, then Lieutenant-Colonel Frederick Irwin (acting).

== Events ==
- 15 July - St Peter's College, Adelaide is founded by members of the Anglican Church of Australia.
- 28 December - Augustus Short, the first Anglican bishop of Adelaide, South Australia arrives from England.

== Science and Technology ==
June – Dentist, John Belisario becomes the first to use ether to anaesthetise a patient

== Births ==
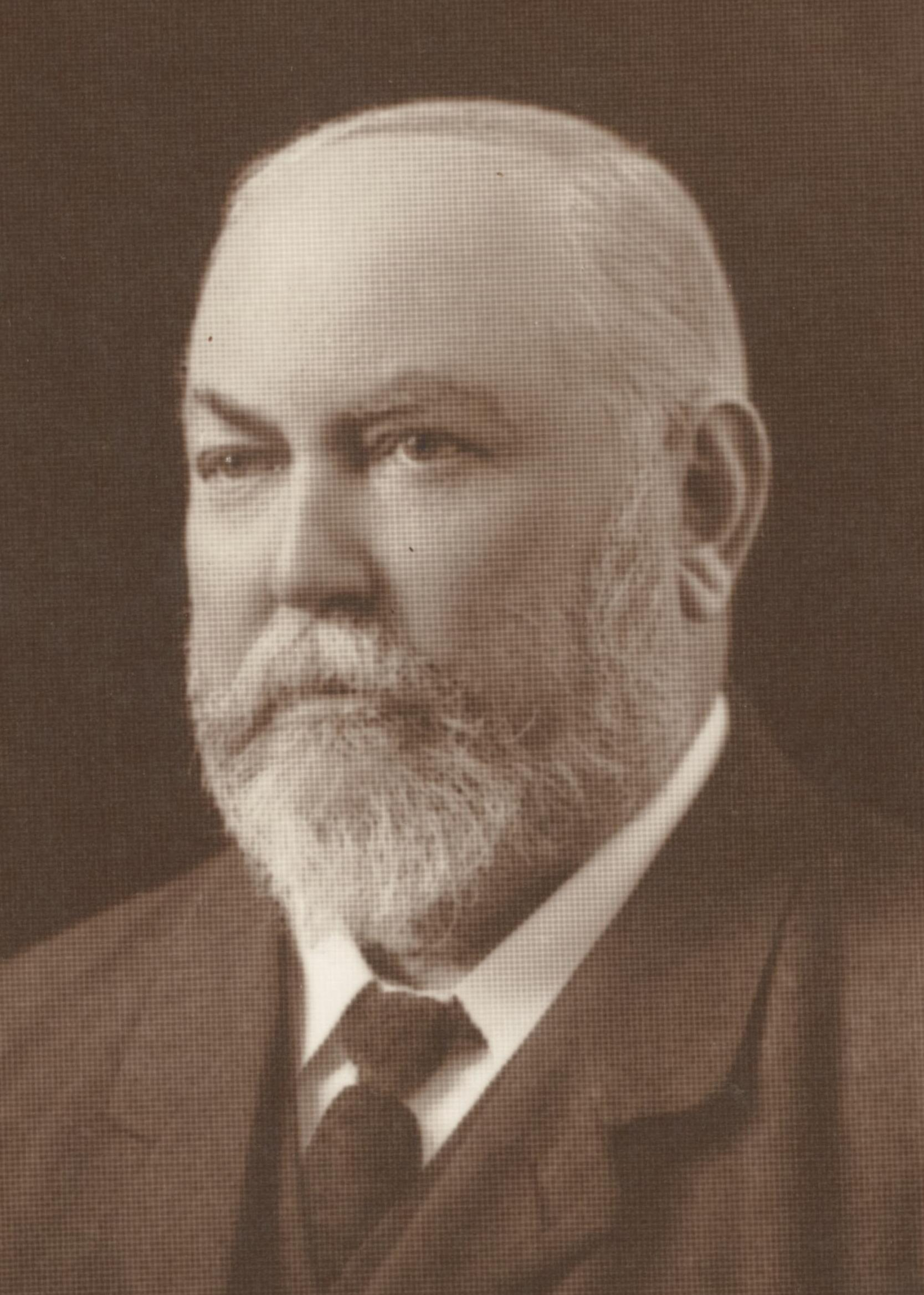
Sir John Forrest

- 12 February – Sir Albert Gould, New South Wales politician (d. 1936)
- 19 February – Josiah Howell Bagster, South Australian politician and land agent (d. 1893)
- 22 February – James Huddart, shipowner and businessman (d. 1901)
- 6 March – Edward Petherick, book collector and archivist (d. 1917)
- 13 March – Samuel Cooke, Victorian politician (d. 1929)
- 5 April – Frederick William Ward, journalist and newspaper editor (d. 1934)
- 7 April – John Arthur, Tasmanian cricketer (d. 1877)
- 23 May – Robert Etheridge Jr., paleontologist (born in the United Kingdom) (d. 1920)
- 23 July – George Sydney Aldridge, businessman (born in the United Kingdom) (d. 1911)
- 22 August – Sir John Forrest, 1st Premier of Western Australia and explorer (d. 1918)
- 3 October – Henry Montgomery, Anglican bishop (d. 1932)
- 8 October – Rose Scott, suffragette (d. 1925)
- 29 October – George Collingridge, writer and illustrator (d. 1931)
- 11 October – Alexander Bolton, New South Wales politician (d. 1918)
- 17 November – Archibald Liversidge, chemist (d. 1927)
- 10 December – Harry Boyle, Test cricketer (d. 1907)

== Deaths ==
- 3 February – Sir John Eardley-Wilmot, 6th Lieutenant-Governor of Van Diemen's Land (born in the United Kingdom) (b. 1783)
- 11 February – Sir Andrew Clarke, 4th Governor of Western Australia (born in Ireland) (b. 1793)
- 25 May – Joseph Wild, explorer (born in the United Kingdom) (b. 1773)
- 11 June – Sir John Franklin, 4th Lieutenant-Governor of Van Diemen's Land (born in the United Kingdom and died in Canada) (b. 1786)
