= 1850 in Australia =

- Decades: 1830s; 1840s; 1850s; 1860s; 1870s
- See also: Other events of 1850; Timeline of Australian history

The following lists events that happened during 1850 in Australia.

== Incumbents ==
- Monarch - Victoria

=== Governors ===
Governors of the Australian colonies:

- Governor of New South Wales – Sir Charles Augustus FitzRoy
- Governor of South Australia – Sir Henry Fox Young
- Governor of Tasmania – Sir William Denison
- Governor of Western Australia as a Crown Colony – Captain Charles Fitzgerald.

== Events ==
- 26 January – The Irish Exile, a weekly newspaper, starts publishing in Hobart by Patrick O'Donoghue: aimed mainly at fellow Irish prisoners and deportees.
- 5 August – Port Phillip (later called Victoria) established as a separate colony from New South Wales.
- 1 June – First convicts arrive in Western Australia, ticket-of-leave transportation suspended in New South Wales.
- 1 October – University of Sydney is founded as Australia's first university.
- Undated – The Port Phillip District Wars end
- Undated – Between 15-20 Indigenous Australians are killed in East Gippsland as part of a series of mass murders of Gunai Kurnai people known as the Gippsland massacres.
- Undated – 16 Indigenous Australians are poisoned to death in Murrindal as part of a series of mass murders of Gunai Kurnai people known as the Gippsland massacres.
- Between 15-20 Indigenous Australians are killed in Brodribb River as part of a series of mass murders of Gunai Kurnai people known as the Gippsland massacres.

== Science and technology ==
- Bucolus fourneti - described by Étienne Mulsant

== Births ==
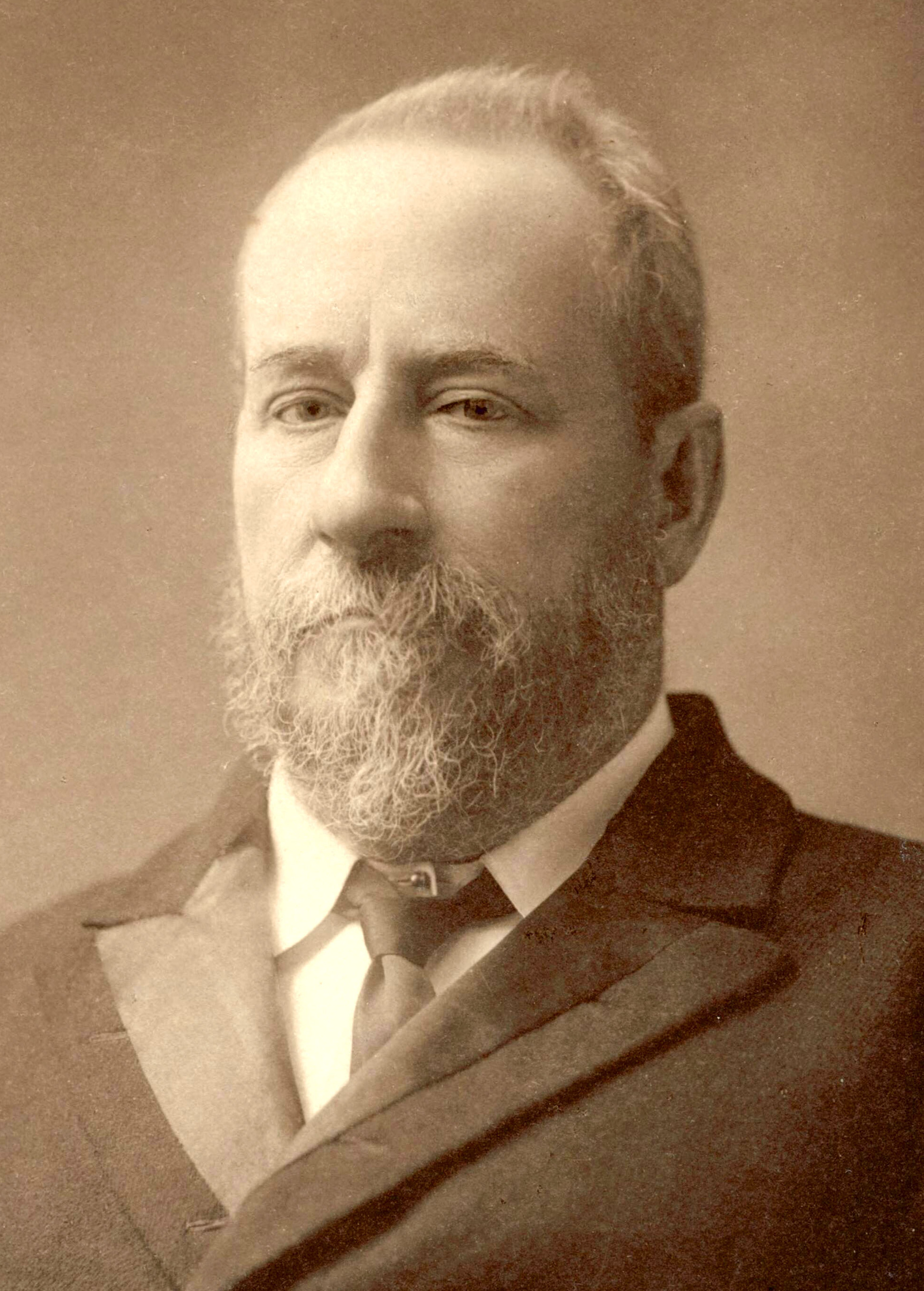
Charles Kingston

- 7 January
  - Joseph James Fletcher, biologist (born in New Zealand) (d. 1926)
  - Robert Richardson, journalist, poet and writer (d. 1901)
- 29 January – Lawrence Hargrave, engineer, explorer, and inventor (born in the United Kingdom) (d. 1915)
- 1 February – Sir Matthew Davis, Victorian politician (d. 1912)
- 13 February – Michael Kelly, 4th Archbishop of Sydney (born in Ireland) (d. 1940)
- 17 February – Alf Morgans, 4th Premier of Western Australia (born in the United Kingdom) (d. 1933)
- 23 February – Octavius Beale, piano manufacturer and philanthropist (born in Ireland) (d. 1930)
- 25 April – William Knox, Victorian politician and businessman (d. 1913)
- 26 April – James Drake, Queensland politician (born in the United Kingdom) (d. 1941)
- 12 May – Sir Frederick Holder, 19th Premier of South Australia (d. 1909)
- 23 August – Sir John Cockburn, 18th Premier of South Australia (born in the United Kingdom) (d. 1929)
- 7 September – James Stewart, Queensland politician (born in the United Kingdom) (d. 1931)
- 22 October – Charles Kingston, 20th Premier of South Australia (d. 1908)
- 23 November – Henry Lowther Clarke, 1st Anglican Archbishop of Melbourne (born in the United Kingdom) (d. 1926)
- 3 December – Sir Richard Butler, 23rd Premier of South Australia (born in the United Kingdom) (b. 1850)
- 21 December – Sir William McMillan, New South Wales politician and businessman (born in Ireland) (d. 1926)
- Unknown – Christie Palmerston, explorer and prospector (d. 1897)
- Unknown – Mei Quong Tart, merchant (born in China) (d. 1903)

== Deaths ==
- 22 January – William Westall, landscape artist (born and died in the United Kingdom) (b. 1781)
- 3 February – Samuel Stocks, jun., businessman in South Australia (born in the United Kingdom c. 1812)
- 9 February – Elizabeth Macarthur, pastoralist and merchant (born in the United Kingdom) (b. 1766)
- 16 June – William Lawson, New South Wales politician and explorer (born in the United Kingdom) (b. 1774)
- 3 September – Ikey Solomon, convict (born in the United Kingdom) (b. 1787)
- Unknown, possibly April – Yuranigh, guide and stockman (b. 1820)
