= 1848 in Australia =

- Decades: 1820s; 1830s; 1840s; 1850s; 1860s
- See also: Other events of 1848; Timeline of Australian history

The following lists events that happened during 1848 in Australia.

== Incumbents ==
- Monarch - Victoria

=== Governors ===
Governors of the Australian colonies:

- Governor of New South Wales – Sir Charles Augustus FitzRoy
- Governor of South Australia – Lieutenant Colonel Frederick Holt Robe (to 2 August) then Sir Henry Fox Young
- Governor of Tasmania – Sir William Denison
- Governor of Western Australia as a Crown Colony – Lieutenant-Colonel Frederick Irwin (acting), then Captain Charles Fitzgerald.

== Events ==
- Letters patent of Queen Victoria declaring Melbourne a city are read on the steps of St Peters, Eastern Hill church.
- 13 February – The first non-British ship carrying immigrants to arrive in Victoria was from Germany; the Goddefroy. Many of those on board were political refugees and known as Forty-Eighters.
- 3 April – Explorer Ludwig Leichhardt was last seen on the Darling Downs. On that date he wrote a letter from MacPherson's Station, Cogoon. Leichhardt had set off for Swan River.
- 11 March – The Savings Bank of South Australia opens with a single employee, trading from a room provided rent-free.
- 29 August – The Cape Otway lighthouse in Victoria is lit for the first time.
- September – Between 9 and 11 Indigenous Australians are killed in the Avenue Range Station massacre.
- Undated - the Aboriginal Witnesses Act 1848. was enacted in South Australia.

== Births ==
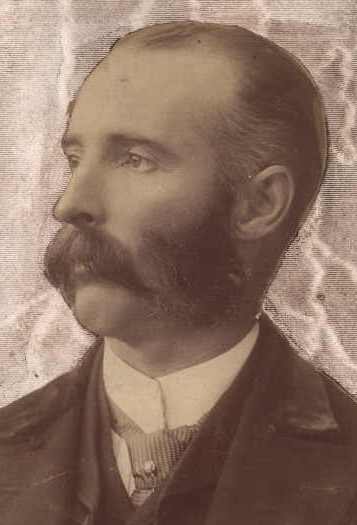
William Shiels

- 4 February – Sir John Winthrop Hackett, Western Australian politician and newspaper proprietor (born in Ireland) (d. 1916)
- 17 February – Louisa Lawson, writer, poet and feminist (d. 1920)
- 24 February – Andrew Inglis Clark, Tasmanian politician and judge (d. 1907)
- 18 May – Sir John Henniker Heaton, postal reformer, journalist, and politician (born in the United Kingdom) (d. 1914)
- 27 May – David Charleston, South Australian politician (born in the United Kingdom) (d. 1934)
- 3 June – Alexander Leeper, educationist (born in Ireland) (d. 1934)
- 8 September – Sir Edward Charles Stirling, South Australian politician and anthropologist (d. 1919)
- 15 October – Sir Langdon Bonython, South Australian politician and journalist (born in the United Kingdom) (d. 1939)
- 18 October – Gregor McGregor, South Australian politician and trade union leader (born in the United Kingdom) (d. 1914)
- 3 December – William Shiels, 16th Premier of Victoria (born in Ireland) (d. 1904)
- 6 December – Sir Edward Hutton, 1st General Officer Commanding Australian Military Forces (born in the United Kingdom) (d. 1923)
- 10 December – Frederick William Piesse, Tasmanian politician (d. 1902)
- 16 December – Walter Madden, Victorian politician (born in Ireland) (d. 1925)
- Unknown – John Mather, artist (born in the United Kingdom) (d. 1916)

== Deaths ==
- 2 May – Frederick Garling, attorney and solicitor (born in the United Kingdom) (b. 1775)
- 25 May – Sir Maurice Charles O'Connell, New South Wales politician and military commander (born in Ireland) (b. 1768)
- 4 June – William Sorell, 3rd Lieutenant Governor of Van Diemen's Land (born in the West Indies and died in the United Kingdom) (b. 1775)
- 18 July – Alexander Macleay, New South Wales politician and entomologist (born in the United Kingdom) (b. 1767)
- 12 November – John Cadman, convict and publican (born in the United Kingdom) (b. 1758)
