= 1851 in Australia =

- Decades: 1830s; 1840s; 1850s; 1860s; 1870s
- See also: Other events of 1851; Timeline of Australian history

1851 in Australia was a watershed year. It saw the start of the Australian gold rushes with significant gold discoveries in both New South Wales (near Bathurst) in February and Victoria in July. As a result of the Gold Rushes, the European population of Victoria increased from 97,489 in 1851 to 538,628 in 1861 and the population of NSW increased from 197,265 in 1851 to 350,860 in 1861. Victoria became a self-governing colony. Sentiment in the eastern Australian colonies moved decisively against penal transportation leading to the end of transportation to Tasmania in 1853. Melbourne's major suburb/satellite city in the Dandenong Ranges, Belgrave was first settled, making it the oldest town in the Dandenong Ranges.

== Incumbents ==
- Monarch - Victoria

=== Governors ===
Governors of the Australian colonies:

- Governor of New South Wales — Sir Charles Augustus FitzRoy
- Governor of South Australia — Sir Henry Fox Young
- Lieutenant-Governor of Tasmania — Sir William Denison
- Lieutenant-Governor of Victoria — Charles La Trobe; (office first formed in 1851)
- Governor of Western Australia as a Crown Colony — Captain Charles Fitzgerald.

== Events ==
=== January–March ===
- 13 January — Charles Augustus FitzRoy was commissioned as "Governor-General of all Her Majesty's Australian possessions". This position was a forerunner of the Governor-General of Australia.
- 6 February – The Black Thursday bushfires rage from Mount Gambier to Melbourne. Fires covered a quarter of what is now the state of Victoria, approximately 50,000 km^{2}. Areas affected include Portland, the Plenty Ranges to the north of Melbourne, Westernport, the Wimmera and Dandenong districts. Approximately 12 people died, one million sheep and thousands of cattle were lost.
- 11 February — Tasmania plays Victoria in the first inter-colonial cricket match.
- 12 February — Edward Hargraves finds evidence of gold near Bathurst, but no announcement is made at that time.
- 28 February – Formation of an Anti-Transportation League from anti-transportation organisations in Victoria and Tasmania.

=== April – Jun ===
- 10 April – The NSW Association for Preventing the Renewal of Transportation sends a petition to Queen Victoria.
- 2 May— Edward Hargraves proclaims the discovery of gold at Ophir, New South Wales. The gold was actually discovered by William Tom and John Lister, between 7 and 12 April 1851.
- 28 May – The arrival of two convict ships, the Lady Kenneway with 249 male prisoners and Blackfriars with 260 female prisoners, further turns Tasmanian sentiment against transportation.
- 14 June – Gold found on the Turon River, New South Wales which proves to be the richest NSW goldfield.

=== July – September ===
- 1 July – Victoria becomes a separate colony
- 2 July – the Melbourne Chamber of Commerce elects their first chairman, William Westgarth, and deputy chairman, J.B.Were.
- 5 July — James Esmond announces the discovery of gold at Clunes, Victoria leading to the start of the Victorian Gold Rush.
- 7 July – News of the discovery of gold at Clunes, Victoria is published in the Geelong Advertiser.
- 10 July – A public meeting in Hobart, one of the largest ever held in Tasmania, calls for the end of transportation.
- 14 July – Sir William Denison, Lieutenant-Governor of Tasmania writes to Earl Grey supporting a continuation of transportation.
- 15 July — Charles La Trobe appointed as first Lieutenant Governor of Victoria.
- 22 July – Northern NSW landholders write to Earl Grey calling for Northern NSW to become a separate colony with transportation of labour. They complain of a shortage of labour due to men going to the goldfields.
- 29 July – 1500 people attend a public meeting to oppose transportation organised by the Australasian League
- 2 August — Gold is first discovered in Ballarat, Victoria, leading to the Victorian gold rush.
- 4 August – The Governor of Western Australia complains of receiving too many convicts as 300 ticket-of-leave men arrive unexpectedly.

=== October – December ===
- 31 October – The New South Wales Legislative Council votes unanimously against transportation 'in any form what-so-ever, to any part of Her Majesty's Australian possessions'.
- 4 December – Charles LaTrobe forwards a Victorian Legislative Council motion passed unanimously opposing further transportation.
- 15 December – Between 14,000 and 20,000 gold miners attend an organised protest at Forest Creek near Castlemaine. The Miners Flag or 'Diggers Banner' was flown for the first time at this meeting.

== Births ==
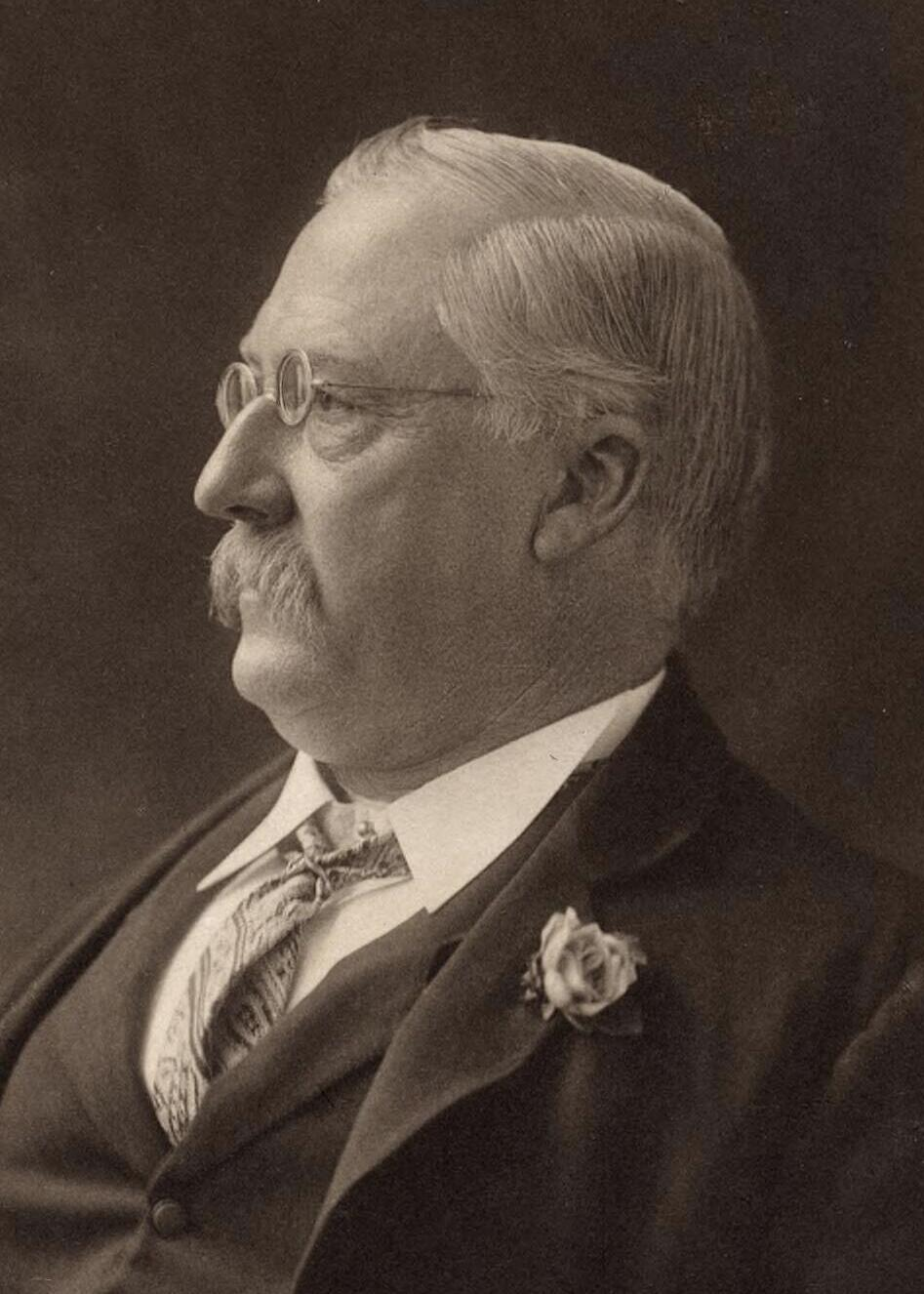
Sir George Turner

- 27 January – Julian Ashton, artist and teacher (born in the United Kingdom) (d. 1942)
- 26 March – Rosa Campbell Praed, novelist (d. 1935)
- 10 April – Maggie Moore, actress (born in the United States) (d. 1926)
- 8 May – James Cuthbertson, poet and schoolteacher (born in the United Kingdom) (d. 1910)
- 28 June – Bruce Smith, New South Wales politician (born in the United Kingdom) (d. 1937)
- 30 June – H. B. Higgins, Victorian politician, lawyer, and High Court justice (d. 1929)
- 3 July – Charles Bannerman, cricketer (born in the United Kingdom) (d. 1930)
- 8 July – John Murray, 23rd Premier of Victoria (d. 1916)
- 1 August – Sir Joseph Verco, physician and conchologist (d. 1933)
- 4 August – Richard O'Connor, New South Wales politician and inaugural High Court justice (d. 1912)
- 8 August – Sir George Turner, 18th Premier of Victoria (d. 1916)
- 3 November – Norman Cameron, Tasmanian politician (d. 1931)
- 28 December – Sir Robert Philp, 15th Premier of Queensland (born in the United Kingdom) (d. 1922)
- Unknown – George Darrell, playwright (born in the United Kingdom) (d. 1921)
- Unknown – John Ford Paterson, artist (born in the United Kingdom) (d. 1912)

== Deaths ==
- 25 February – James Ebenezer Bicheno, author and colonial official (born in the United Kingdom) (b. 1785)
- 8 June – John Piper, military officer, public servant and landowner (born in the United Kingdom) (b. 1773)
- 26 August – Andrew Bent, newspaper proprietor (born in the United Kingdom) (b. 1790)
