= 1844 in Australia =

- Decades: 1820s; 1830s; 1840s; 1850s; 1860s
- See also: Other events of 1844; Timeline of Australian history

The following lists events that happened during 1844 in Australia.

== Incumbents ==
- Monarch - Victoria

=== Governors ===
Governors of the Australian colonies:

- Governor of New South Wales – Sir George Gipps
- Governor of South Australia – Sir George Grey
- Governor of Tasmania – Sir John Eardley-Wilmot
- Governor of Western Australia as a Crown Colony – John Hutt.

== Events ==
- 1 January – Australia's first ringing peal rang from the bells of St Mary's Cathedral, Sydney
- February – public ferry service commences between Balmain East ferry wharf and the Australian Gas Light Company wharf at Millers Point, Sydney.
- 6 April – John Gavin is the first European settler to be legally executed in Western Australia. Gavin, a fifteen-year-old apprentice, was found guilty of the murder of his employer's son, George Pollard.
- 12 September – The Royal Society of Tasmania was formed. It was the first branch of the Society established outside Britain.
- 29 September – Norfolk Island was transferred from the Colony of New South Wales to the Colony of Van Diemen's Land
- Undated – Port Augusta War
- Undated – An unknown number of Indigenous Australians are murdered by Angus McMillan's men at Maffra as part of a series of mass murders of Gunai Kurnai people known as the Gippsland massacres.
- Undated – Aboriginal Orphans Act 1844, is enacted in South Australia, whereby the Protectors of Aborigines was made legal guardian of "every half-caste and other unprotected Aboriginal child whose parents are dead or unknown".
- Undated – Aborigines' Evidence Act 1844 permitting Indigenous South Australians to give unsworn evidence in Court.
- Undated – Aboriginal Girls Protection Act 1844, is enacted in Western Australia to prevent Aboriginal girls from leaving or running away from school or their employed service.
- Undated – Wellington Convict and Mission Site, convict agricultural station and Aboriginal mission closed.
- Undated – The permanent first crossing of the Yarra River opens at the site of the now Princes Bridge in Melbourne.

== Exploration and settlement ==
- August – Charles Sturt explores the Stony Desert, fails to establish existence of an inland sea.
- 1 October – Ludwig Leichhardt leads expedition starting from Jimbour on the Darling Downs to Port Essington, Northern Territory, arriving in December 1845.

== Science and technology ==
- Penfolds winery is established in Adelaide by Christopher Rawson Penfold & Mary Penfold.
- The Wheal Watkins lead and silver mine commences operations in Glen Osmond, South Australia.

== Arts and literature ==
- A Vocabulary of the Parnkalla [Barngarla] Language, Spoken by the Natives Inhabiting the Western Shores of Spencer's Gulf, is compiled by Clamor Wilhelm Schürmann, a Lutheran missionary in South Australia.
- Letters on the Culture of the Vine, Fermentation, and the Management of the Cellar is published by botanist and vigneron, Sir William Macarthur.
- The Shipping Gazette and Sydney General Trade List is first published by Charles Kemp and John Fairfax.
- Hawkesbury Courier newspaper commenced publication in Windsor, New South Wales by Geoffrey Amos Eagar.
- A painting of the Cascades Female Factory in Van Diemen's Land is completed by painter, John Skinner Prout.
- Louisa Anne Meredith publishes her book, Notes and Sketches of New South Wales, an account of her first 11 years in Australia.

== Births ==
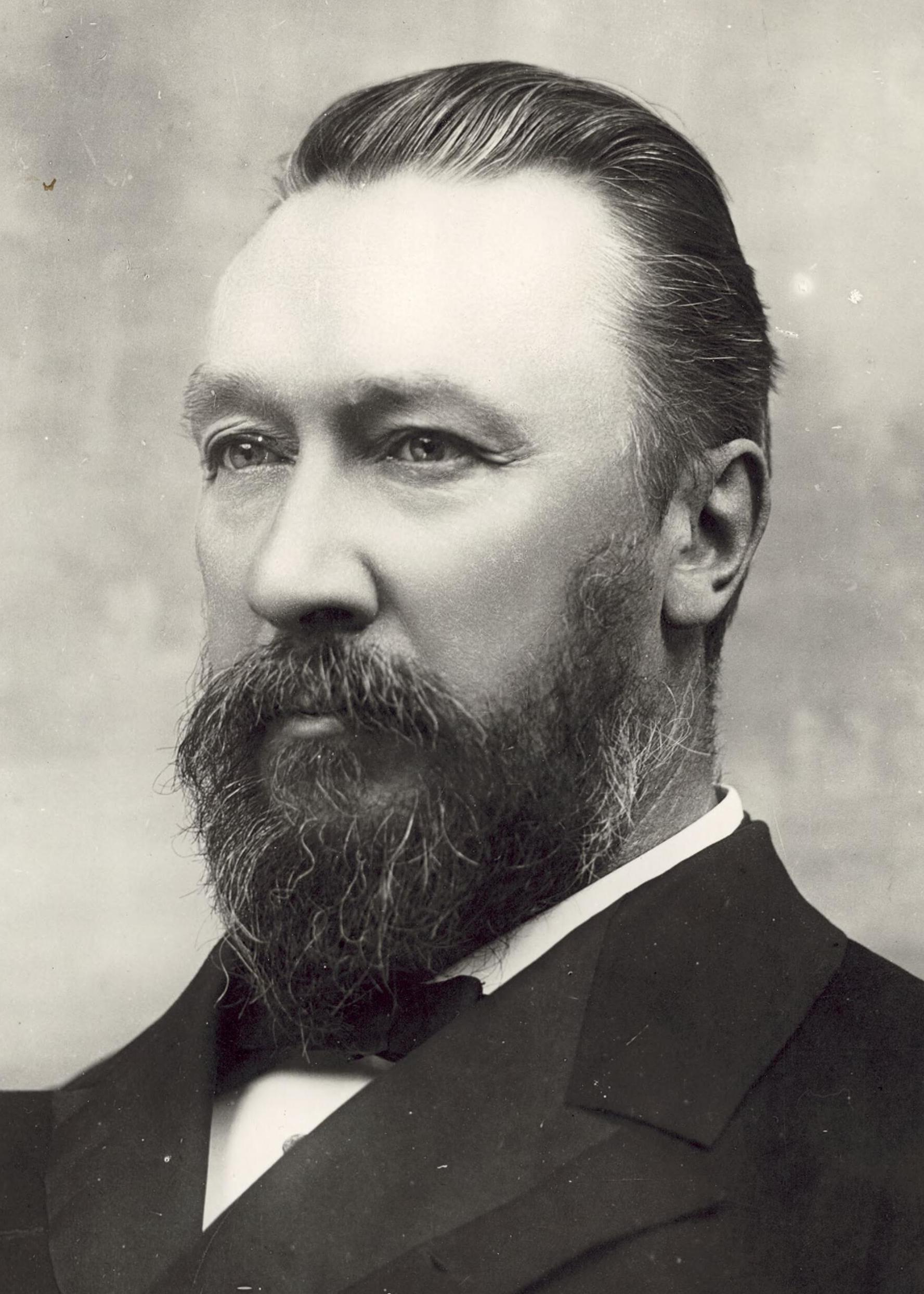
Sir William Lyne

- 3 January – Michael Rush, champion rower (born Ireland) (d. 1922)
- 24 January – Alexander Paterson, Queensland politician (born in the United Kingdom) (d. 1908)
- 31 January – James McColl, Victorian politician (born in the United Kingdom) (d. 1929)
- 7 February – Joseph Brown, Victorian politician (born in the United Kingdom) (d. 1925)
- 8 February – John McGarvie Smith, metallurgist, bacteriologist and benefactor (d. 1918)
- 26 February – Thomas Glassey, 1st Queensland Opposition Leader (born in Ireland) (d. 1936)
- 16 March – Thomas Blackburn, priest and entomologist (born in the United Kingdom) (d. 1912)
- 28 March – Emma Howson, opera singer and actress (d. 1928)
- 17 March – Sir Henry Briggs, Western Australian politician (born in the United Kingdom) (d. 1919)
- 6 April
  - Francis Bertie Boyce, clergyman and social reformer (born in the United Kingdom) (d. 1931)
  - Sir William Lyne, 13th Premier of New South Wales (d. 1913)
- 9 May – Thomas Macdonald-Paterson, Queensland politician (born in the United Kingdom) (d. 1906)
- 11 May – Watkin Wynne, journalist, councillor and newspaper owner (born in the United Kingdom) (d. 1921)
- 16 May – Sir John Madden, 4th Chief Justice of Victoria (born in Ireland) (d. 1918)
- 28 June – John Boyle O'Reilly, Irish poet, journalist and escapee convict (born in Ireland) (d. 1890)
- 21 August – Carl Feilberg, journalist, newspaper editor and human rights activist (born in Denmark) (d. 1887)
- 26 August – J. C. Williamson, actor (born in the United States) (d. 1913)
- 27 August – Rosina Palmer (née Carandini), opera singer (d.1932)
- 30 August – William Tietkens, explorer and naturalist (born in the United Kingdom) (d. 1933)
- 2 September – James Macfarlane, Tasmanian politician (born in the United Kingdom) (d. 1914)
- 10 September – Abel Hoadley, businessman and confectioner (born in the United Kingdom) (d. 1918)
- 26 September – Charles Strong, preacher and minister (born in the United Kingdom) (d. 1942)
- 29 September – Edward Pulsford, New South Wales politician (born in the United Kingdom) (d. 1919)
- 14 October – Sir John See, 14th Premier of New South Wales (born in the United Kingdom) (d. 1907)
- 15 October – John Gavan Duffy, Victorian politician (born in Ireland) (d. 1917)
- 21 October – Joseph William Sutton, engineer, shipbuilder, inventor (born in the United Kingdom) (d. 1914)
- 22 October – Margaret Forrest, botanical collector (born France') (d. 1929)
- 13 November – Andrew Harper, biblical scholar and teacher (born in the United Kingdom) (d. 1936)
- 21 November – Ada Cambridge, writer and poet (born in the United Kingdom) (d. 1926)
- 14 December – Maggie Oliver, actor and comedian (d. 1892)
- 5 December – Sir Charles Mackellar, New South Wales politician and surgeon (d. 1926)
- Unknown – William Sawers, New South Wales politician (born in the United Kingdom) (d. 1916)
- Unknown – William McMinn, surveyor and architect, (born in the United Kingdom) (d. 1884)
- Unknown – Mary Jane Cain, community leader and Gomeroi woman (d. 1929)
- Unknown – Alfred James Daplyn, painter (born in the United Kingdom) (d. 1926)
- Unknown – Amy Jane Best, schoolmistress (d. 1932)

== Deaths ==
- 13 February – John Knatchbull, murderer, is publicly executed in Sydney (born in the United Kingdom) (b.1789)
- 30 April – George Jones, bushranger is publicly executed in Tasmania (born in the United Kingdom) (b. 1815)
- 19 May – Conrad Theodore Knowles, actor and theatre manager (born in the United Kingdom) (b. 1810)
- 29 June – Sir John Jamison, New South Wales politician, physician and pastoralist (born in Ireland) (b. 1776)
- 8 July – John Terry, miller and farmer (born in the United Kingdom) (b. 1771)
- 14 September – Prosper de Mestre, businessman and merchant (born in France) (b. 1789)
- 27 September – Sir James Dowling, 2nd Chief Justice of New South Wales (born in the United Kingdom) (b. 1787)
- 22 October – John Charles Darke, explorer, died after being speared (born in the United Kingdom) (b.1806)
- Undated – Anna Josepha King, settler and First Lady of New South Wales (born in the United Kingdom) (b. 1765)
