= 1854 in Australia =

- Decades: 1830s; 1840s; 1850s; 1860s; 1870s
- See also: Other events of 1854; Timeline of Australian history

The following lists events that happened during 1854 in Australia.

== Incumbents ==
=== Governors ===
Governors of the Australian colonies:

- Governor of New South Wales – Sir Charles Augustus FitzRoy
- Governor of South Australia – Sir Henry Young (term ended 20 December)
- Lieutenant-Governor of Van Diemen's Land – Sir William Denison
- Lieutenant-Governor of Victoria – Charles La Trobe (until 5 May), then Sir Charles Hotham (from 22 June)
- Governor of Western Australia as a Crown Colony – Captain Charles Fitzgerald

== Events ==
This was a year of intense political agitation by miners on the Victorian goldfields.

- 3 March – The first telegraph line in the southern hemisphere begins operating in Victoria.
- 4 July – Anti-Chinese riots occur in Victoria.
- 5 July – The Mercury was first published in Hobart.
- 17 October – The Melbourne daily newspaper The Age was first published.
- 29 November – The Eureka Flag was flown for the first time during the Eureka Stockade rebellion in Ballarat.
- 3 December – battle suppressing the rebellion at Eureka Stockade

== Exploration and settlement ==
- 4 January – Captain William McDonald aboard the Samarang discovers the McDonald Islands.
- 12 September – Lieutenant-Governor of Victoria Charles Hotham opens Flinders Street station, the first city railway station in Australia.

== Sport ==
- 30 September – The first game of cricket is played at the Melbourne Cricket Ground.

== Births ==
- 12 February – Edward Wittenoom, Western Australian politician (d. 1936)
- 24 March – Sir Henry Lefroy, 11th Premier of Western Australia (d. 1930)
- 12 April – William Maloney, Victorian politician and doctor (d. 1940)
- 20 May – George Prendergast, 28th Premier of Victoria (d. 1937)
- 25 June – Andrew Lang Petrie, Queensland politician (d. 1928)
- 5 August – William Aitcheson Haswell, zoologist (born in the United Kingdom) (d. 1925)
- 18 October – Billy Murdoch, cricketer (d. 1911)
- 30 November – James Wilkinson, Queensland politician (d. 1915)
- Unknown, possibly December – Ned Kelly, bushranger (d. 1880)

== Deaths ==
- 7 October – James Scobie, gold miner (born in the United Kingdom) (b. 1826)
- Unknown – Jackey Jackey (b. 1833)
