= 1849 in Australia =

- Decades: 1820s; 1830s; 1840s; 1850s; 1860s
- See also: Other events of 1849; Timeline of Australian history

The following lists events that happened during 1849 in Australia.

== Incumbents ==
- Monarch - Victoria

=== Governors ===
Governors of the Australian colonies:

- Governor of New South Wales – Sir Charles Augustus FitzRoy
- Governor of South Australia – Sir Henry Fox Young
- Governor of Tasmania – Sir William Denison
- Governor of Western Australia as a Crown Colony – Captain Charles Fitzgerald

== Events ==
- 26 January – The Australasian Anti-Transportation League is formed during a public meeting at Launceston, Tasmania; later branches were formed in Adelaide, Melbourne, Sydney, and Canterbury (New Zealand).
- 23 February – Public meeting in Perth calls for introduction of convicts to the help the colony's depressed economy, first consignment arrive in the following June.
- May – A clash between European settlers and Aboriginal Australians resulted in the Waterloo Bay massacre.

== Births ==
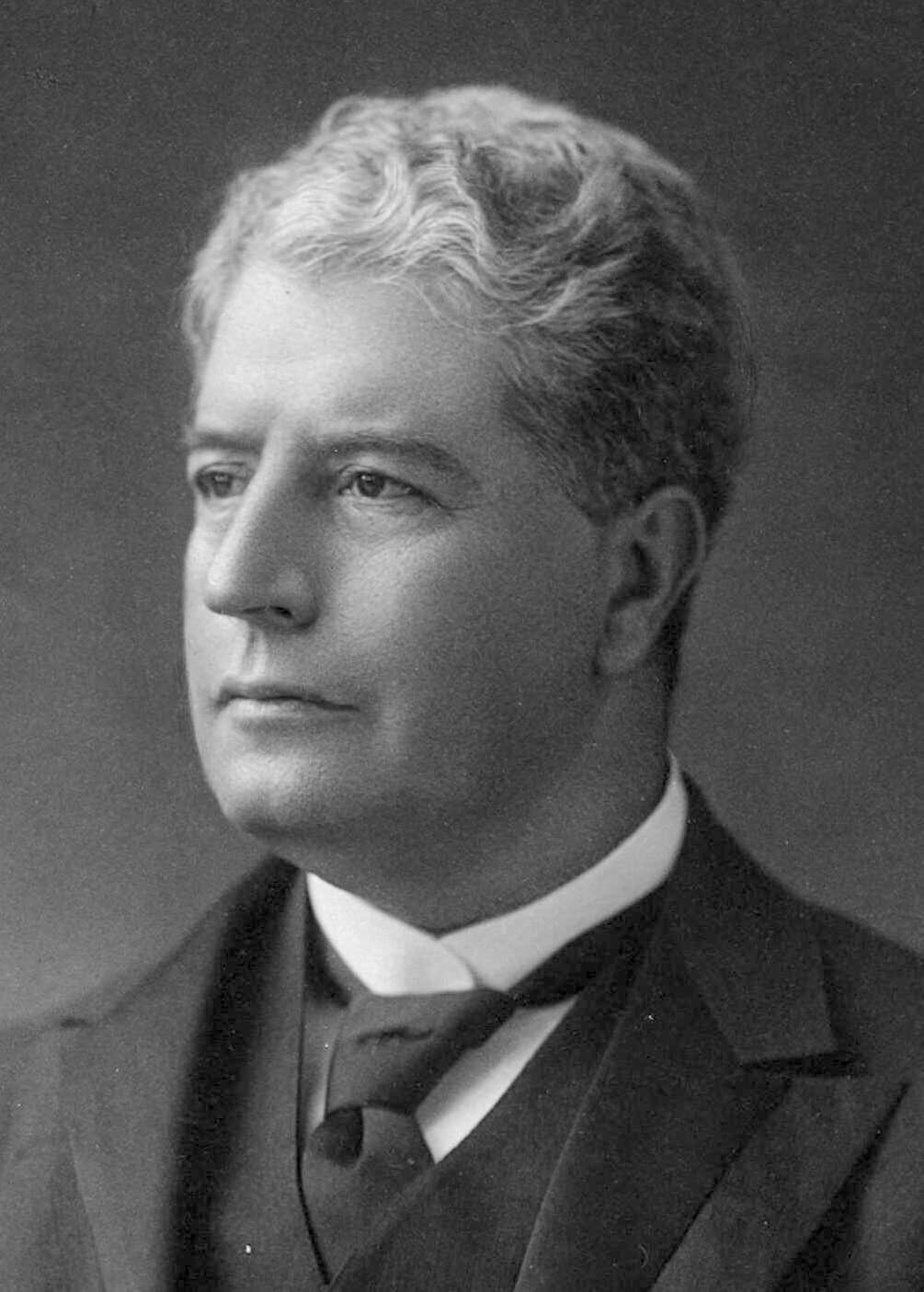
Sir Edmund Barton

- 18 January – Sir Edmund Barton, 1st Prime Minister of Australia and inaugural High Court justice (d. 1920)
- 11 February – Fred Bamford, Queensland politician (d. 1934)
- 26 March – Edwin Evans, cricketer (d. 1921)
- 27 July – Archibald Watson, surgeon (d. 1940)
- 8 August – Hume Nisbet, novelist and artist (born in the United Kingdom) (d. 1923)
- 17 August – William Kidston, 17th Premier of Queensland (born in the United Kingdom) (d. 1919)
- 29 August – Sir John Sulman, architect (born in the United Kingdom) (d. 1934)
- 22 September – Alexander Forrest, Western Australian politician and explorer (d. 1901)
- 24 September – Justin Foxton, Queensland politician (d. 1916)
- 5 November – Sir Lancelot Stirling, South Australian politician (d. 1932)
- 2 December – Frank Allan, cricketer (d. 1917)
- 28 December – Dugald Thomson, New South Wales politician (born in the United Kingdom) (d. 1922)
