= 1852 in Australia =

- Decades: 1830s; 1840s; 1850s; 1860s; 1870s
- See also: Other events of 1852; Timeline of Australian history

The following lists events that happened during 1852 in Australia.

== Incumbents ==
=== Governors ===
Governors of the Australian colonies:

- Governor of New South Wales – Sir Charles Augustus FitzRoy
- Governor of South Australia – Sir Henry Fox Young
- Lieutenant-Governor of Tasmania – Sir William Denison
- Lieutenant-Governor of Victoria – Charles La Trobe
- Governor of Western Australia as a Crown Colony – Captain Charles Fitzgerald.

== Events ==
- 10 February – the Supreme Court of Victoria sits for the first time in Melbourne.
- 1–2 April – The Nelson robbery takes place in Hobsons Bay.
- 25 June – The Murrumbidgee River flooded Gundagai, New South Wales killing 89 of the population of 250. The town was moved to higher ground. The flooding continued but no deaths occurred.
- 4 July – Anti-Chinese riots occur in Victoria, Australia.
- 11 October – The University of Sydney was inaugurated, Australia's first university.

== Births ==
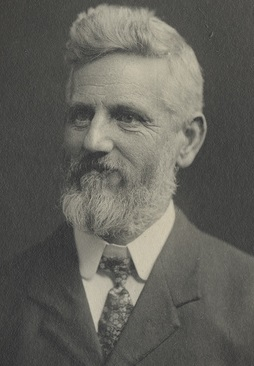
Thomas Price

- 19 January – Thomas Price, 24th Premier of South Australia (born in the United Kingdom) (d. 1909)
- 28 January – Louis Brennan, mechanical engineer and inventor (born in Ireland) (d. 1932)
- 8 February – Sir Malcolm McEacharn, Victorian politician and shipping magnate (born in the United Kingdom) (d. 1910)
- 26 March – Alexander Sutherland, educator, writer and philosopher (born in the United Kingdom) (d. 1902)
- 14 April – Sir John Quick, Victorian politician and lawyer (born in the United Kingdom) (d. 1932)
- 20 July – Sir William Rooke Creswell, 1st Naval Officer Commanding the Commonwealth Naval Forces (born in Gibraltar) (d. 1933)
- 12 August – Algernon Keith-Falconer, 9th Earl of Kintore, 12th Governor of South Australia (born in the United Kingdom) (d. 1930)
- 19 August – Edward Rennie, scientist (d. 1927)
- 4 September – Edmund Banfield, author and naturalist (born in the United Kingdom) (d. 1923)
- 18 September – Clement Wragge, meteorologist (born in the United Kingdom) (d. 1922)
- 20 November – Henry Hoyle, New South Wales politician and rugby league administrator (d. 1926)
- 26 November – Arthur Groom, Victorian politician and land agent (d. 1922)
- 27 December – John Ferguson, minister (born in the United Kingdom) (d. 1925)

== Deaths ==
- 21 May – James Mudie, officer, landowner and author (born and died in the United Kingdom) (b. 1779)
- 29 June – Jeffery Hart Bent, judge (born in the United Kingdom and died in Guyana) (b. 1781)
- 16 October – George Evans, surveyor and explorer (born in the United Kingdom) (b. 1780)
- Unknown – Johann Menge, explorer and geologist (born in Hesse-Cassel) (b. 1788)
