= 1846 in Australia =

- Decades: 1820s; 1830s; 1840s; 1850s; 1860s
- See also: Other events of 1846; Timeline of Australian history

1846 in Australia
- Monarch: Queen Victoria
- Population: 293,249

The following lists events that happened during 1846 in Australia.

== Incumbents ==
- Monarch - Victoria

=== Governors ===
Governors of the Australian colonies:

- Governor of New South Wales – Sir George Gipps
- Governor of South Australia – Lieutenant Colonel Frederick Holt Robe
- Governor of Tasmania – Sir John Eardley-Wilmot
- Governor of Western Australia as a Crown Colony – John Hutt, then Lieutenant-Colonel Andrew Clarke.

== Events ==
- January – Gold is found at the Victoria Mine near Castambul, in the Adelaide Hills
- February – The Peruvian is shipwrecked after running into a submerged reef off the coast of north-eastern Australia, the few survivors making landfall at Cape Cleveland.
- formation of "The South Australian League for the Maintenance of Religious Freedom in the Province" in response to the proposed funding of Church of England education from public funds
- August – An unknown number of Indigenous Australians are killed in the Blanket Bay massacre.
- 1 July – William Westwood, a bushranger, leads the Cooking Pot Uprising in the penal colony of Norfolk Island in response to the confiscation of convicts' cooking vessels under the orders of the Commandant of the penal settlement, Major Joseph Childs.
- 23 September – Explorer John Ainsworth Horrocks dies at Penwortham in South Australia, a month after he accidentally shot himself in a hunting accident.
- 13 October – Bushranger Lawrence Kavenagh is executed by hanging.
- Undated – 14 Indigenous Australians are killed in South Gippsland as part of a series of mass murders of Gunai Kurnai people known as the Gippsland massacres.
- Undated – 8 Indigenous Australians are killed by Captain Henry Dana and the Aboriginal Police as part of a series of mass murders of Gunai Kurnai people known as the Gippsland massacres.
- Undated – Launceston Synagogue is consecrated.

== Science and technology ==
- Royal Botanic Gardens Victoria is established in Melbourne

== Arts and literature ==
- 2 June – first editions of Melbourne's daily newspaper, The Argus; and of Brisbane's weekly newspaper, Moreton Bay Courier, are published.

== Sport ==
- February – Australia's first swimming championships are held at Robinson's Domain Baths.

== Births ==
- 4 January – John Neild, New South Wales politician (born in the United Kingdom) (d. 1911)
- 10 February – Sir James Burns, New South Wales politician, shipowner and philanthropist (born in the United Kingdom) (d. 1923)
- 17 February – Sir John George Davies, Tasmanian politician, newspaper proprietor and cricketer (d. 1913)
- 17 March – Edward O'Sullivan, New South Wales politician and journalist (d. 1910)
- 24 April – Marcus Clarke, author (born in the United Kingdom) (d. 1881)
- 4 May – Jack Want, New South Wales politician (d. 1905)
- 15 July – William Trenwith, 1st Leader of the Victorian Labor Party (d. 1925)
- 17 July – Nicholas Miklouho-Maclay, explorer, ethnologist and anthropologist (born and died in the Russian Empire) (d. 1888)
- 7 August – William Spence, trade union leader and politician (born in the United Kingdom) (d. 1926)
- 27 August– Augusta Zadow, South Australian trade unionist (born Duchy of Nassau) (d. 1896)
- 28 August – G. H. Gibson "Ironbark", poet (born in England) (d. 1921)
- 26 September – Mary Hannay Foott "La Quenouille", poet and editor (born in Scotland) (d. 1918)
- 27 September – Sir Josiah Symon, South Australian politician (born in the United Kingdom) (d. 1934)
- 7 October – Charles Rasp, prospector (born in Germany) (d. 1907)
- 20 October – Sir William MacGregor, 11th Governor of Queensland (born in the United Kingdom) (d. 1919)
- 7 November – Sir Stephen Henry Parker, 5th Chief Justice of Western Australia (d. 1927)
- 18 November – Lord Northcote, 3rd Governor-General of Australia (born in the United Kingdom) (d. 1911)
- 14 December – John Dunn, bushranger (d. 1866)
- 16 December – William Miller, athlete (born in the United Kingdom) (d. 1939)

== Deaths ==
- 16 March – Henry Kable, convict and businessman (born in the United Kingdom) (b. 1763)
- 20 March – Joseph Foveaux, soldier and convict settlement administrator (born and died in the United Kingdom) (b. 1767)
- 15 April – Robert Campbell, New South Wales politician and merchant (born in the United Kingdom) (b. 1769)
- 26 July – William Hutchinson, convict, public servant and businessman (born in the United Kingdom) (b. 1772)
- 26 August – Esther Abrahams, convict (born in the United Kingdom) (b. 1767/1771)
- 23 September – John Ainsworth Horrocks, pastoralist and explorer (born in the United Kingdom) (b. 1818)
- 13 October – Lawrence Kavenagh, bushranger (born in Ireland) (b. 1810)
- 6 November – Yilbung, indigenous Australian resistance figure (b. 1815)
- 12 December – Charles Alexandre Lesueur, naturalist, artist and explorer (born and died in France) (b. 1778)
- 26 December – George Imlay, Scottish pioneer in Australia (born in Scotland) (b. 1794)
- undated – Munangabum, Indigenous Australian leader of the Dja Dja Wurrung people
