= 1845 in Australia =

- Decades: 1820s; 1830s; 1840s; 1850s; 1860s
- See also: Other events of 1845; Timeline of Australian history

The following lists events that happened during 1845 in Australia.

== Incumbents ==
- Monarch - Victoria

=== Governors ===
Governors of the Australian colonies:

- Governor of New South Wales – Sir George Gipps
- Governor of South Australia – Sir George Grey (to 25 October), then Lieutenant Colonel Frederick Holt Robe
- Governor of Tasmania – Sir John Eardley-Wilmot
- Governor of Western Australia as a Crown Colony – John Hutt.

== Events ==
- 12 March – St John the Baptist Church in Reid Canberra is consecrated.
- 4 August – The ship Cataraqui is wrecked off the coast of Tasmania, the 406 people on board drown.
- 9 May – F. H. Faulding & Co pharmaceutical company founded in Adelaide, Australia.
- 20 July – Charles Sturt enters the Simpson Desert in central Australia.
- 21 June – News of the discovery of a rich body of copper ore at Burra, South Australia is published in Adelaide newspapers.
- 17 December – Ludwig Leichhardt arrives at Port Essington, Northern Territory, after an overland journey of 4800 km from Jimbour on the Darling Downs.
- Undated – Port Augusta War ends
- Undated – An unknown number of Indigenous Australians are killed in the Darkey Flat massacre.
- Wool export in Australia – 24 million pounds.
- Hobart Synagogue building is completed in Hobart, Tasmania.

== Arts and literature ==
- True Love, or an Interlude Interrupted, play and comic farce is written.
- The Beautiful Squatter, a poem by Australian poet Charles Harpur is published.
- South Australian Gazette and Colonial Register is first published, 5 July 1845.

== Births ==
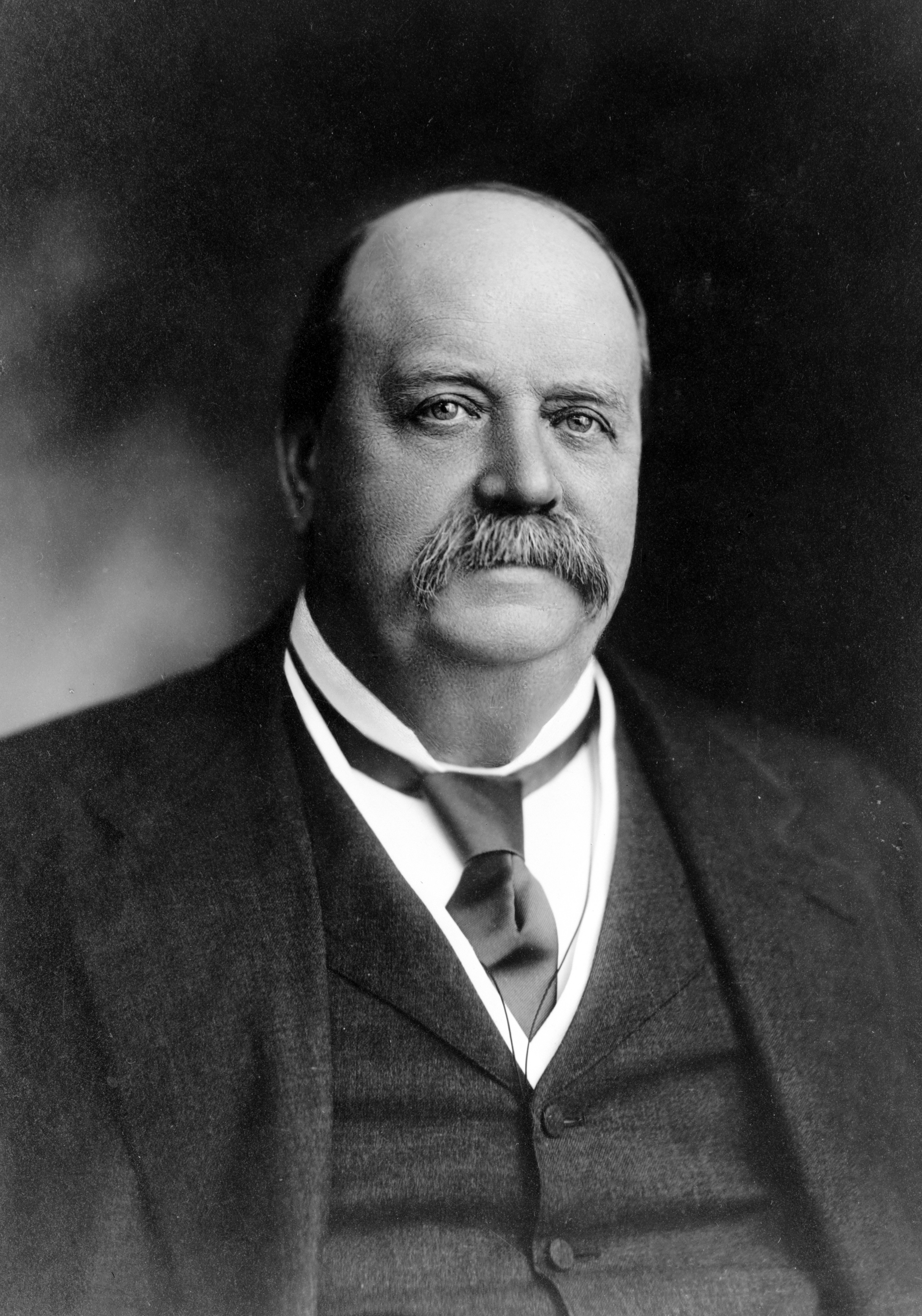
Sir George Reid

- 12 January – Walter Howchin, geologist (born in the United Kingdom) (d. 1937)
- 11 February – John Chanter, New South Wales politician (d. 1931)
- 16 February – Maybanke Anderson, suffragette and reformer (born in the United Kingdom) (d. 1927)
- 17 February – Percival Ball, sculptor (born in the United Kingdom) (d. 1900)
- 25 February – Sir George Reid, 4th Prime Minister of Australia and 12th Premier of New South Wales (born in the United Kingdom) (d. 1918)
- 20 March – Victor Child Villiers, 7th Earl of Jersey, 17th Governor of New South Wales (born in the United Kingdom) (d. 1915)
- 3 April – William Farrer, agronomist (born in the United Kingdom) (d. 1906)
- 7 April – Margaret McLean, Victorian temperance and women's rights advocate (born in Scotland) (d.1923)
- 15 April – Dave Gregory, cricketer (d. 1919)
- 16 June – William Charles Kernot, engineer (born in the United Kingdom) (d. 1909)
- 21 June
  - Henry Brockman, Western Australian politician (d. 1916)
  - Sir Samuel Griffith, 9th Premier of Queensland and 1st Chief Justice of Australia (born in the United Kingdom) (d. 1920)
- 10 September – Jessie Rooke, Tasmanian suffragette and temperance (born in United Kingdom) (d.1906)
- 19 October – Frank Hann, pastoralist and explorer (born in the United Kingdom) (d. 1921)
- 21 October – Ernest Favenc, explorer, journalist and author (born in the United Kingdom) (d. 1908)
- 15 December – Thomas Skene, Victorian politician (d. 1910)
- 30 December – Thomas Edward Spencer, writer (born in the United Kingdom) (d. 1911)
- John and Sarah Makin - convicted of murders born.
- John William Lindt, ethnographic photographer and early photojournalist (born in Germany) (d. 1926)
- Brettena Smyth, women's rights activist born in Kyneton, Victoria. (d. 1898)

== Deaths ==
- 28 June – John Gilbert, English naturalist and explorer, killed during a violent altercation at Mitchell River (Queensland) (b. 1812)
- 5 August – John Blaxland, New South Wales politician and explorer (born in the United Kingdom) (b. 1769)
- Undated – John Kinchela, barrister, politician and judge (born in the United Kingdom) (b. 1774)
