= 1842 in Australia =

- Decades: 1820s; 1830s; 1840s; 1850s; 1860s
- See also: Other events of 1842; Timeline of Australian history

The following lists events that happened during 1842 in Australia.

== Incumbents ==
- Monarch - Victoria

=== Governors ===
Governors of the Australian colonies:

- Governor of New South Wales - Sir George Gipps
- Governor of South Australia - Sir George Grey
- Governor of Tasmania - Captain Sir John Franklin
- Governor of Western Australia as a Crown Colony - John Hutt.

== Events ==
- January – Hundreds of Indigenous Australians are murdered at Bruthen Creek as part of a series of mass murders of Gunai Kurnai people known as the Gippsland massacres.
- 21 June – Norfolk Island convict rebellion
- 20 July – An Act (6 Vic. No 3) passed "to declare the town of Sydney to be a city and to incorporate the inhabitants thereof".
- 12 August – Melbourne incorporated as a "town".
- 21 August – Hobart Town is proclaimed a city.
- Undated – 5 European men are killed in the Pelican Creek tragedy by Aboriginals of the Bundjalung Nation at dawn as they slept.
- Undated – 100 Bundjalung Nation Aboriginal people are killed in the Evans Head massacre in retaliation for the killing of 'a few sheep', or the killing of 'five European men' from the 1842 Pelican Creek tragedy.
- Undated – An unknown number of Indigenous Australians are murdered at Skull Creek as part of a series of mass murders of Gunai Kurnai people known as the Gippsland massacres.

== Births ==
- 15 January – Mary MacKillop, religious sister (d. 1909)
- 1 February – Robert Harper, Victorian politician (born in the United Kingdom) (d. 1919)
- 26 April – Paddy Hannan, gold prospector (born in Ireland) (d. 1925)
- 31 May – Sir John Cox Bray, 15th Premier of South Australia (d. 1894)
- 22 June – Sir Richard Baker, South Australian politician (d. 1911)
- 5 July – Andrew "Captain Moonlite" Scott, bushranger (born in Ireland) (d. 1880)
- 17 July – Sir Alexander Onslow, 3rd Chief Justice of Western Australia (d. 1908)
- 10 September – Charles French, horticulturist, naturalist, and entomologist (born in the United Kingdom) (d. 1933)
- 23 September – John Brazier, malacologist (d. 1930)
- 29 September – Sir Joseph Palmer Abbott, New South Wales politician (d. 1901)
- 10 October – Emily Dobson, philanthropist (d. 1934)
- 18 October – Robert Reid, Victorian politician (born in the United Kingdom) (d. 1904)
- 18 November – Sir Frederick Broome, 11th Governor of Western Australia (born in Canada) (d. 1896)
- 11 December – William Gosse, explorer (born in the United Kingdom) (d. 1881)
- 14 December – Julia Matthews, actress and singer (born in the United Kingdom) (d. 1876)
- 19 December – Emma Withnell, pastoralist and businesswoman (d. 1928)
- Unknown – Richard Edwards, Queensland politician (born in the United Kingdom) (d. 1915)
- Unknown – John Gilbert, bushranger (born in Canada) (d. 1865)

== Deaths ==
- 18 August – Louis de Freycinet, explorer (born and died in France) (b. 1779)
