= 1855 in Australia =

- Decades: 1830s; 1840s; 1850s; 1860s; 1870s
- See also: Other events of 1855; Timeline of Australian history

The following lists events that happened during 1855 in Australia.

== Incumbents ==
- Monarch - Victoria

=== Governors ===
Governors of the Australian colonies:

- Governor of New South Wales – Sir Charles Augustus FitzRoy
- Governor of South Australia – Sir Richard MacDonnell (from 8 June)
- Lieutenant-Governor of Van Diemen's Land – Henry Young (from 8 January)
- Lieutenant-Governor of Victoria (Governor of Victoria from 22 May) – Sir Charles Hotham (until 10 November)
- Governor of Western Australia as a Crown Colony – Captain Charles Fitzgerald, then Sir Arthur Kennedy.

== Events ==
- 5 January – The War of Southern Queensland ends with the hanging of Dundalli.
- 12 June – the Victorian parliament passed the Chinese Restriction Act in an effort to restrict Chinese immigration. These restrictions, including a £10 poll tax on Chinese and a limit to Chinese passengers per tonnage of shipping.
- 8 September – Queen Victoria signs an Order in Council to change the name of Van Diemen's Land to Tasmania.
- 26 September – Sydney to Parramatta railway opened

== Births ==
- 30 January – George Edwards, New South Wales politician (d. 1911)
- 16 February – Henry Saunders, Western Australian politician (born in the United Kingdom) (d. 1919)
- 28 May – Sir William Portus Cullen, New South Wales politician and 7th Chief Justice of New South Wales (d. 1935)
- 18 June – George Lewis Becke, trader and writer (d. 1913)
- 6 August – Sir Isaac Isaacs, 9th Governor-General of Australia and 3rd Chief Justice of Australia (d. 1948)
- 13 August – William Astley, short story writer (born in the United Kingdom) (d. 1911)
- 25 August – Paddy Glynn, South Australian politician (born in Ireland) (d. 1931)
- 28 October – Francis James Gillen, anthropologist and ethnologist (d. 1912)
- 22 November – Pharez Phillips, Victorian politician (d. 1914)

== Deaths ==
- 5 January – Dundalli, Aboriginal lawman, murderer and resistance fighter (c. 1820)
- 23 January – John Burdett Wittenoom, clergyman (born in the United Kingdom) (b. 1788)
- 19 March – Thomas Bock, artist (born in the United Kingdom) (b. 1790)
- 3 April – John Bateman, merchant and whaler (born in the United Kingdom) (b. 1789)
- 31 December – Sir Charles Hotham, 1st Governor of Victoria (born in the United Kingdom) (b. 1806)
