= 1843 in Australia =

- Decades: 1820s; 1830s; 1840s; 1850s; 1860s
- See also: Other events of 1843; Timeline of Australian history

The following lists events that happened during 1843 in Australia.

== Incumbents ==
- Monarch - Victoria

=== Governors ===
Governors of the Australian colonies:

- Governor of New South Wales – Sir George Gipps
- Governor of South Australia – Sir George Grey
- Governor of Tasmania – Captain Sir John Franklin
- Governor of Western Australia as a Crown Colony – John Hutt.

== Events ==
- Between 15 June and 3 July the 1843 New South Wales colonial election and Australia's first colonial election, was held .
- July – Up to 150 Indigenous Australians are murdered by Angus McMillan's men in the Warrigal Creek Massacre as part of a series of mass murders of Gunai Kurnai people known as the Gippsland massacres.
- 12 September – The Battle of One Tree Hill was a conflict between European settlers and Aboriginals.
- Undated – The Argyle Cut in The Rocks is started, using convict labour, it is completed in 1864, using free labourers.
- Undated – The War of Southern Queensland begins between a coalition of Aboriginal tribes in South East Queensland, the "United Tribes", and the United Kingdom of Great Britain and Ireland it would be fought until 1855.
- Undated – Lindeman's wine company, is founded in by Dr Henry John Lindeman (d. 1881) in New South Wales.

== Science and technology ==
- September – John Ridley builds his invention, a corn stripper-harvester, in Hindmarsh.

== Births ==
- 11 January – C. Y. O'Connor, engineer (born in Ireland) (d. 1902)
- 2 May – James Garvan, New South Wales politician (born in Ireland) (d. 1896)
- 6 July – Sir John Downer, 16th Premier of South Australia (d. 1915)
- 24 July – Nathaniel Dawes, bishop (born in the United Kingdom) (d. 1910)
- 27 July – Joseph Vardon, South Australian politician and printer (d. 1913)
- 24 August – Boyd Dunlop Morehead, 10th Premier of Queensland (d. 1905)
- 26 September – Joseph Furphy, author and poet (d. 1912)
- 1 October – Garnet Walch, writer, journalist and publisher (d. 1913)
- 9 October – Alexander William Jardine, engineer (d. 1920)
- 5 November – Sir Harry Rawson, 21st Governor of New South Wales (born in the United Kingdom) (d. 1910)
- 25 December – Edward Ellis Morris, lexicographer and educationist (born in India) (d. 1902)
- 28 December – Ebenezer Wake Cook, artist (born in the United Kingdom) (d. 1926)

== Deaths ==
- 22 December – John Bigge, judge and royal commissioner (born and died in the United Kingdom) (b. 1780)
