= 1841 in Australia =

- Decades: 1820s; 1830s; 1840s; 1850s; 1860s
- See also: Other events of 1841; Timeline of Australian history

The following lists events that happened during 1841 in Australia.

== Incumbents ==
- Monarch - Victoria

=== Governors ===
Governors of the Australian colonies:

- Governor of New South Wales - Sir George Gipps
- Governor of South Australia - Lieutenant Colonel George Gawler to 15 May then Sir George Grey
- Governor of Tasmania - Captain Sir John Franklin
- Governor of Western Australia as a Crown Colony - John Hutt.

== Events ==
- February: An unknown number of Wardandi people (a Noongar Aboriginal people) are killed in the Wonnerup massacre.
- 3 May – New Zealand was proclaimed a colony independent from New South Wales.
- 7 June – Darlinghurst Gaol took in its first prisoners.
- 1 July – The convict assignment system was abolished in New South Wales and Van Diemen's Land and was replaced by the probation gang system.
- 27 August – Rufus River massacre.
- 1 September – Port Phillip Savings Bank was established.
- 23 October – Caroline Chisholm established the Female Immigrants Home to help unemployed new arrivals to Australia.
- Undated – Between 30 and 35 Indigenous Australians are murdered by Angus McMillan's men at Butchers Creek (now known as Boxes Creek, Metung) as part of a series of mass murders of Gunai Kurnai people known as the Gippsland massacres.
- Undated – An unknown number of Indigenous Australians are murdered by Angus McMillan's men at Maffra as part of a series of mass murders of Gunai Kurnai people known as the Gippsland massacres.

== Exploration and settlement ==
- February - The first economic minerals discovered in Australia were silver and lead at Glen Osmond, now a suburb of Adelaide in South Australia.
- 7 April - Edward John Eyre becomes the first European to cross the Nullarbor Plain. He arrived in Western Australia with Wylie, an indigenous Australian who accompanied him. Eyre left Fowlers Bay, South Australia on 25 February and reached Albany, Western Australia on 7 July.

== Science and technology ==
- 13 April - the first photograph was taken in Australia by a visiting naval captain, Captain Augustin Lucas
- 24 May - Gas lighting used for the first time in Sydney.
- William Bland published a paper on the first scarlet fever epidemic in Australia; probably Australia's earliest contribution to clinical medicine.

== Arts and literature ==
- The first Australian book for children was published in Sydney, A mother's offering to her children, by a 'lady long resident in New South Wales'. Although published anonymously, the author is Charlotte Barton.

== Births ==
- 26 February – William Horn, South Australian politician, philanthropist and mining magnate (d. 1922)
- 20 March – James Walker, New South Wales politician (born in the United Kingdom) (d. 1923)
- 15 April – Mary Grant Roberts, zoo owner (d. 1921)
- 17 April – William Hartnoll, Tasmanian politician (d. 1932)
- 26 May – John Moffat, entrepreneur (born in the United Kingdom) (d. 1918)
- 3 July – James Styles, Victorian politician (born in the United Kingdom) (d. 1913)
- 4 August – James Chalmers, missionary (born in the United Kingdom) (d. 1901)
- 13 August – Johnny Mullagh, cricketer (d. 1891)
- 24 December – Henry Dobson, 17th Premier of Tasmania (d. 1918)

== Deaths ==
- 20 January – Jørgen Jørgensen, adventurer and writer (born in Denmark) (b. 1780)
- 16 March – Edward Davis, bushranger (b. ?), hanged
- 8 November – Sir Francis Forbes, 1st Chief Justice of New South Wales (born in Bermuda) (b. 1784)
