= Windsor Express and Richmond Advertiser =

Former newspaper in New South Wales, Australia

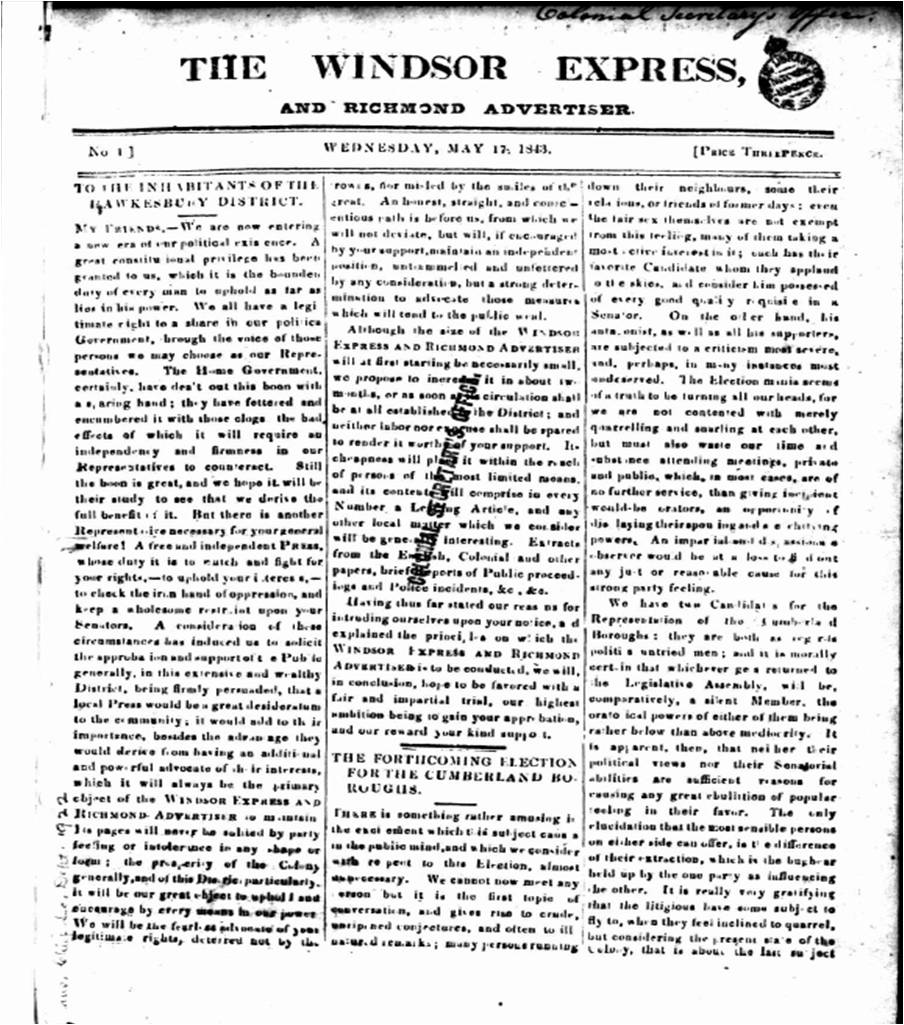
Windsor Express and Richmond Advertiser, 17 May 1843

The Windsor Express and Richmond Advertiser, established in 1843, was the first known permanent newspaper in the Hawkesbury and Hawkesbury River district in New South Wales. Despite the area being settled by Europeans by 1794, prior to this the Hawkesbury inhabitants relied on the Sydney newspapers (such as the Sydney Gazette and Sydney Morning Herald) for their news.

== History ==
The first issue of the Windsor Express appeared on the 17 May 1843 and cost threepence to purchase. It appeared weekly and was published and printed by Geoffrey Amos Eagar at his Printing Office in Smiths Buildings, George Street in Windsor. Eagar was established as a printer in Sydney by the late 1820s and was involved in the newspaper business in Tasmania, South Australia and New Zealand as well as New South Wales.

The political situation of the Hawkesbury district was mentioned in the first issue, stating that "a new era of our political existence" had arrived. As part of this liberty the publisher outlined that this new publication was to be "a free and independent press, whose duty it is to watch and fight" for the privileges of the local community. The aim of the Windsor Express was to become an impartial campaigner of the local people. The paper survived for twelve months, the final issue dated 9 May 1844.

Two months after the Windsor Express ceased publication Geoffrey Eagar commenced publication of a new newspaper in the Hawkesbury area. The Hawkesbury Courier and Agricultural and General Advertiser operated between 1844 and 1846. These were the only newspapers published in the Hawkesbury in the 1840s.

== Digitisation ==
Only incomplete copies of the Windsor Express have survived. The paper has been digitised as part of the Australian Newspapers Digitisation Program project of the National Library of Australia.

== See also ==
- List of newspapers in Australia
