= Robert Richardson (poet) =

Australian poet and writer for children

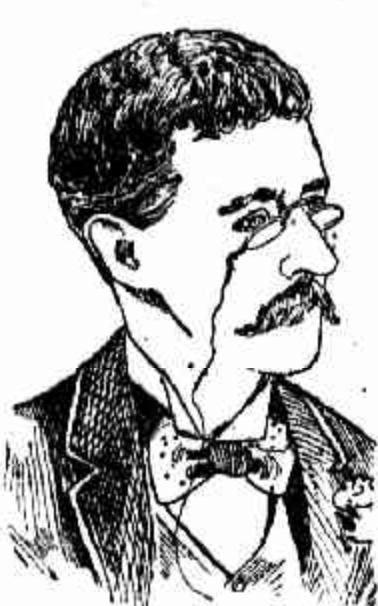
- Robert Richardson
- Born: 7 January 1850; Colony of New South Wales
- Died: 4 October 1901 (aged 51); Armidale, New South Wales, Australia
- Occupations: writer and store-keeper
- Writing career
- Language: English
- Years active: 1875–1901

Robert Richardson (1850–1901) was an Australian journalist, poet and writer for children, possibly the first Australian-born children's writer. He was born in New South Wales, eldest son of John Richardson, a New South Wales politician and store-keeper, and Janet, sister of Peter Nicol Russell.

Richardson completed a B.A. at the University of Sydney and later became well known for his contributions to a number of Sydney and Australian periodicals and newspapers. He was also a member of the firm of Richardson and Company, an Armidale-based millers and general store-keepers, started by his father.

Mark Twain adapted the final stanza of his poem Annette for Twain's daughter's headstone.

He left Australia for a life in Edinburgh in 1886 before returning to Sydney around 1894. He died in Armidale on 4 October 1901.

== Bibliography ==
=== Children's fiction ===
- Our Junior Mathematical Master; and, A Perilous Errand (1876)
- Black Harry, or, Lost in the Bush (1877)
- The Young Cragsman and Other Stories (1878)
- A Little Australian Girl, or, The Babes in the Bush; and, Jim : A Little Nigger (1881)
- Little Flotsam : A Story for Boys and Girls, and Other Tales (1881)
- The Best of Chums and Other Stories (1881)
- A Lighthouse Keeper for a Night and Other Stories (1881)
- The Hut in the Bush : A Tale of Australian Adventure, and Other Stories (1883)
- Adventurous Boat Voyages (1884)

=== Poetry ===
- Willow and Wattle : Poems (1893), including Annette
