= Maggie Oliver (actor) =

Australian actor and comedian

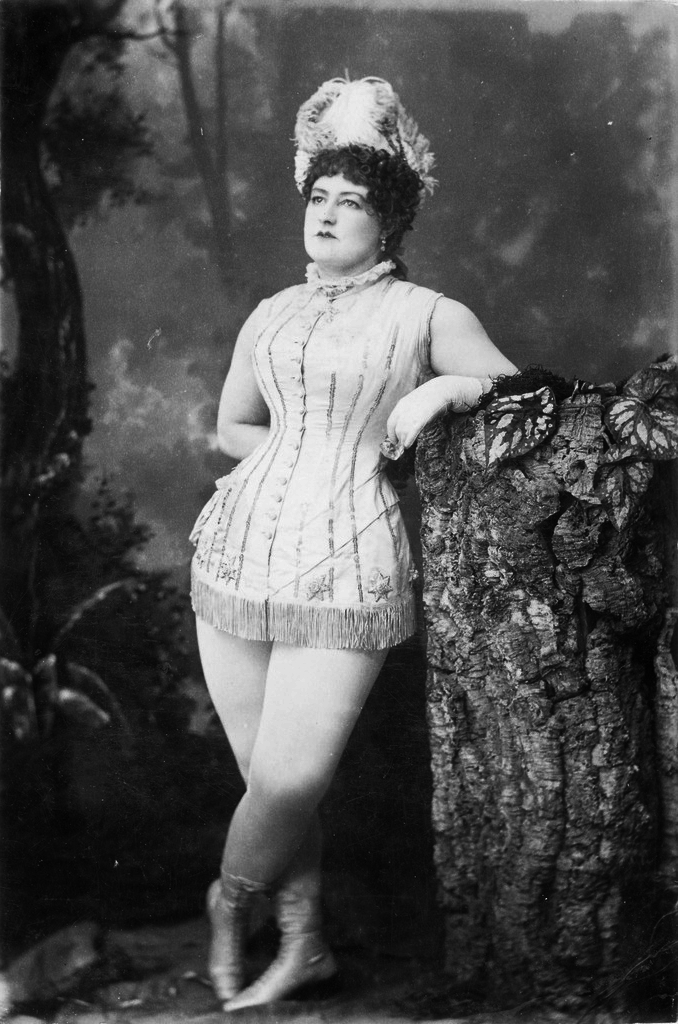
- Born: 14 December 1844
- Died: 21 May 1892 (aged 47)
- Occupations: Actor, comedian
- Spouse: John King (married 1869–77)

Maggie Oliver (14 December 1844 – 21 May 1892) was an Australian actress, comedian and burlesque performer.

Oliver was born on 14 December 1844 in Sydney, to Catherine (née Fitzgerald) and Michael Walsh, a blacksmith.

In 1862 she joined the Redfern Dramatic Society in Sydney, taking on Irish comic parts, as well as female and male roles. Her comedic roles were a favourite of audiences. Her favourite part was reportedly that of Paddy Miles in The Limerick Boy.

She performed regularly as a touring actor at the Theatre Royal Adelphi Sydney, Royal Victoria Theatre, Princess Theatres of Forbes and Grenfell, and was acclaimed an Australian success as Arrah in Arrah Na Pogue.

According to the Evening News Supplement, she was the most popular Australian actress of her time, saying:

She was the most popular Australian actress of these latter days – the darling alike of dress circle, stalls, pit, and gallery. Who does not remember her joyous laugh on the stage? and let me here remark that it is not everyone who can laugh or cry "to order". Only the true artist who "feels" a character can do so; one who can pass naturally from grave to gay and make the puise of an auditor beat quicker, and such a one was Maggie Oliver. Her laugh was an inspiration, and it was infectious. It did not seem forced; the transition to tears came naturally from a heart "always open to melting charity." That was the great secret of her success. She entered for the time being into the joys and sorrows of the part she was playing, and her whole soul was in it.

She married John King in 1869, and divorced him in 1877.

Oliver died on 21 May 1892 at the age of 47, and was buried in Waverley Cemetery in Sydney.
