= Victoria Police Gazette =

Newsletter of Victoria Police, Australia

The Victoria Police Gazette commenced in December 1853 and was initially published weekly by the Victoria Police.

Originally the Gazettes for each state were not available to the public, but were produced for informing members of the police force and government officials. Today archival copies are a resource for historians because the Gazette provides early records detailing names members of the military and the police force, lists deserters from merchant ships, the armed forces and of wives and children. It also provides details of victims and felons, the names absconded convicts from Tasmania and New South Wales, along with reports of serious crime from South Australia.

Another section in the Gazettes was one headed 'Missing Friends'. Most people listed thereunder were not criminals, but were merely sought by police so that relatives, old friends, or government officials could renew contact with them.

In the case of the deserters of wives and children, the Victoria Police Gazette would list (where known) the name of the offender, their place of birth, age, occupation, the area in which they had been living, their possible future movements and known relatives. In some cases the deserted person was also named.

It included entries that covered:

- People wanted for questioning in relation to various other crimes.
- Prisoners discharged from either city or country gaols.
- Extracts from Police Gazettes in New South Wales, South Australia, Queensland, Tasmania, New Zealand, and occasionally, overseas countries.
- Extracts from the Hobart Town Gazette of escaped convicts and the name of the person to whom they were assigned.

== Legislative origin ==
The Legislative Council of Victoria passed an Act on 8 January 1853, for the regulation of the police force. At the time there were seven distinct police bodies in Victoria, each acting independently: the Melbourne and County of Bourke Police; the City of Geelong Police; the Goldfields Police; the Gold Escort; the Water Police; the Rural Bench Constabulary; and the Mounted Police.

In December of that year, the Victoria Police Gazette started as an official means of pooling information among these newly uniformed bodies.

== Archives ==
Copies on microfiche of the Victoria Police Gazette spanning 1853 to 1870 are available at the Hawthorn branch (584 Glenferrie Road) and Kew branch (Cnr Cotham Road and Civic Drive Kew) of the City of Boroondara Library Service.

== See also ==
- List of newspapers in Australia
