= Frederick William Ward =

Frederick William Ward (5 April 1847 – 1 July 1934) was an Australian journalist, newspaper editor and Methodist minister.

Ward by David Low

Ward was born in New Zealand, the fourth son of the Rev. Robert Ward, a Primitive Methodist clergyman, and was sent to Brisbane, Australia around 1867 as a Methodist minister. He was then sent to Newcastle, New South Wales but resigned in 1869 and then joined the Wesleyan Church.

In 1876 Ward left the ministry and became a journalist. In 1877 he edited the Wesleyan Weekly Advocate, then from 1879 to 1884 edited The Sydney Mail and the Echo 1883 to 1884. From 1884 to 1890, Ward was editor of The Sydney Morning Herald. He was later editor of The Brisbane Courier until he resigned in 1898 when he was appointed leader-writer for the Melbourne Argus. He was then editor of the Sydney Daily Telegraph 1903–1914 and the Brisbane Telegraph 1916–1920.

Ward died at home in Kirribilli, Sydney on 1 July 1934. He was survived by two sons and two daughters.
