= Hawkesbury Courier and Agricultural and General Advertiser =

Australian periodical

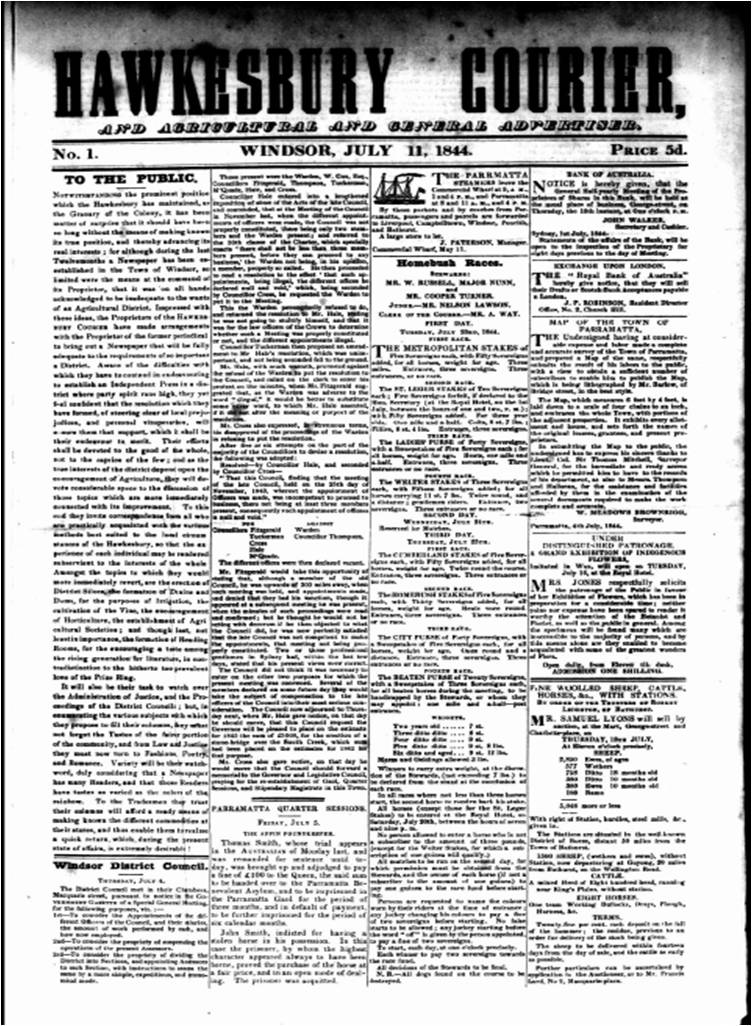
Hawkesbury Courier and Agricultural and General Advertiser, 11 July 1844

The Hawkesbury Courier and Agricultural and General Advertiser was a weekly English language newspaper published in Windsor, New South Wales from 1844 to 1846. It was the second newspaper to be established in the Hawkesbury River district in New South Wales.

== History ==
The Hawkesbury Courier commenced on the 11 July 1844 and followed a similar format to the defunct Windsor Express and Richmond Advertiser with four pages and cost five pence per issue. It was printed and published by Geoffrey Amos Eagar in his premises located in Bridge Street and then later in George Street, Windsor. Eager had also published the Windsor Express and Richmond Advertiser between 1843 and 1844. Statham and Forster were the proprietors of the newspaper and also owned the Sydney-based The Australian newspaper which functioned between 1824 and 1848. This is believed to be the first newspaper chain to operate in Australia.

== Digitisation ==
The paper has been digitised as part of the Australian Newspapers Digitisation Program project of the National Library of Australia.

== See also ==
- List of newspapers in Australia
- List of newspapers in New South Wales
