= Darkey Flat massacre =

Massacre in Queensland, Australia

Date	circa 1845
Location	Darkey Flat (now known as Pratten), Queensland 28°05′16″S 151°46′59″E
Result	Massacre of aboriginal Australians

Belligerents
European settlers	Aboriginal Australians

The Darkey Flat Massacre is a massacre of Aboriginal Australians by European settlers that supposedly took place some time in the 1840s. There is no eyewitness, first-hand, or clear documentary evidence relating to the massacre and there is some doubt as to whether it actually occurred.
