= John Belisario =

Australian dentist (1820–1900)

- Born: 1820; Cheltenham, England
- Died: June 17, 1900 (aged 79–80); Waverley, New South Wales, Australia
- Occupation: Dental surgeon
- Spouses: Mary Longfield (m. 2 January 1843 – 31 May 1849); Isabella Helen (m. 7 October 1854 – 17 June 1900)

John Belisario (1820 – 17 June 1900) was an Australian dental surgeon who was a pioneer in the use of anaesthesia in dentistry.

== Early life ==
Born in England of Spanish ancestry to a slaveholding family, Belisario was a frail child who was sent to his uncle's plantation in the West Indies to improve his health. He returned to England and served an apprenticeship at St Thomas's Hospital in London but, having developed a preference for warmer climes, he decided to move to Sydney, Australia in 1841.

== Career ==
In June 1847, Belisario used ether to anaesthetise a patient; he is believed to be the first person in Australia to do so. An account of Belisario's use of ether was reported in The Sydney Morning Herald on 16 June 1847. In an advertisement in the same year, Belisario announced that he was able, with the use of "ethereal inhalation, to perform the most difficult operations in dental surgery, with perfect freedom from pain".

Being a pioneer in the use of anaesthesia in dentistry brought him substantial fame. In 1854, he was awarded an honorary doctorate from the Baltimore College of Dental Surgery. He was a corresponding member of the Academy of Natural Sciences, Philadelphia, the Odontological Society of London, and the American Academy of Dental Surgery.

== Personal life ==
Belisario met Mary Longfield of Cork on the voyage to Australia in 1841. They were married on 2 January 1843 at St Peter's Church of England, Campbelltown. Mary died, aged 24, on 31 May 1849. He then married Isabella Helen, daughter of Dr Ramsay of Dobroyd. Belisario died on 17 June 1900. He was survived by Isabella, three children of his first marriage, and two of the second marriage.
