= Richmond River massacres =

Killings of colonisers and Indigenous Australians

Coordinates: 28°52′36″S 153°30′19″E

The Richmond River massacres were a series of murders of groups of Indigenous Australians and European Australians in the region around the Richmond River in north-eastern New South Wales in the mid-nineteenth century.

== Massacres ==
=== Pelican Creek massacre ===
In 1842, five European men were killed at Pelican Creek, 10 kilometres north of Coraki. The incident led to a reprisal known as the Evans Head massacre.

The following is a reminiscence of Mr. T.J. Olive of Woodburn, recorded in 1928. Mr Olive claimed his father George was a squatter and had taken part in the 1842 massacre:

Squatters and Sawyers had set up a storehouse at Pelican Creek where sailing vessels left supplies and picked up loads of red cedar. Soon after the storehouse was established provisions were left with five men and one boy who were to guard the supplies before they were redistributed to other areas. One morning at dawn the Aboriginals crept up and massacred the men. Only the boy who escaped into the bush was left to tell the tale. Later when teamsters arrived at the storehouse, they were shocked to find the horribly mutilated bodies of the five men and that all the goods had been stolen or totally destroyed. Word soon spread to other Europeans who became frightened. They formed a mounted posse and had a simple plan to take revenge with their muskets and pistols. They mustered all the men who could be spared and when the avenging party got together it numbered eleven. They advanced the theory that the foul deed was the work of the coastal tribe.

=== Evans Head massacre ===
The 1842 massacre of 100 Bundjalung Nation Aboriginal people at Evans Head by Europeans, was variously said to have been in retaliation for the killing of 'a few sheep', or the killing of 'five European men' from the 1842 Pelican Creek tragedy.

It is also referred to as the 'Goanna Headland massacre'.

=== East Ballina massacre ===
In 1853-4, at an area close to the old East Ballina Golf Course, the Native Police killed between 30 and 40 Aboriginal people of the Arakwal tribe of the Bundjalung people, including men, women and children while they slept, and many who got away were badly wounded.

It is believed that some Aboriginal people from north of the Tweed River had murdered some Europeans and that the murderers had fled south towards the Richmond River.

On the night prior to the raid, the police contingent which included both Native Police trackers and European troopers, stayed at James Ainsworth's father's Public House, 'The Sailor's Home'. At 3 am the following morning the Native Mounted Police patrol rode out to where between 200 and 300 tribes-people lay asleep in camp. The Nyangbal East Ballina clan of the Bundjalung Nation had a camping ground on the slope of the hill facing the valley near Black Head. The troopers and trackers surrounded the camp and opened fire at close range. After the carnage, the Native Mounted Police patrol then headed north towards the Tweed River.

The matter was reported to the NSW Government but no action against the perpetrators was taken.

When the Aboriginal survivors eventually returned to the camp, they sought no reprisals and took no revenge against the Native Police trackers and European troopers involved in the massacre.

There is an Aboriginal oral tradition that tells stories of escape, of people who were shot and were laid to rest in the forests north of the camp, and of those who were driven off the cliff at Black Head.

There is a belief that some victims of the massacre were never buried, their bodies being either dumped off the cliff at Black Head or abandoned on Angels Beach.

=== South Ballina poisoning ===
The Nyangbal South Ballina clan of the Bundjalung Nation, numbered about 200 people during the early development of Ballina Township.

During the early 1860s a mass poison attempt was made against the clan using poisoned flour given to make damper. After taking the flour to their camp, the older people and children of the Nyangbal tribe refused to eat the damper as it was a new food. Upon waking the next morning, survivors found nearly 150 adults dead.

== See also ==
- Australian frontier wars
- List of massacres of Indigenous Australians
- Myall Creek massacre
