= Frederick Irwin =

Irish soldier and administrator

Frederick Chidley Irwin Lieutenant Colonel
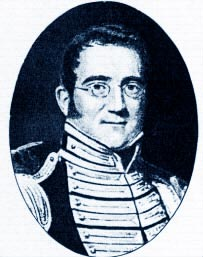
- Born: March 22, 1794; Drogheda, Ireland
- Died: March 31, 1860 (aged 66); Cheltenham, England
- Notable work: The State and Position of Western Australia
- Title: Acting Governor of Western Australia
- Spouse: Mary Russel (m. 1834; died 1834) Elizabeth Courthope (m. 1836)
- Awards: Military General Service Medal
- Honours: Knight of the Royal Guelphic Order

Lieutenant-Colonel Frederick Chidley Irwin, KH (22 March 1794 – 31 March 1860) was acting Governor of Western Australia from 1832 to 1833 and 1847 to 1848.

Born in 1794 in Drogheda, Ireland, Frederick Chidley Irwin was the son of Reverend James Irwin and Elizabeth Chamney. Some sources give the year 1788 as his birth year.

In 1808, he was commissioned into the 83rd (County of Dublin) Regiment of Foot. He saw service in Spain and Portugal, and took part in several major battles of the Peninsular War (1807-1814), for which he was awarded a medal. In 1816-17 he was stationed in Cape of Good Hope, and later in Ceylon.

His obituary states:

He entered the army on 25 March 1808 and served in the Peninsula from April 1809 to February 1814 including the capture of Oporto, battles of Talavera and Fuentes D'Onor, siege and storm of Cuidad Rodrigo, siege of Badajoz and capture of the castle by escalade, on the 7th April, 1812, battle of Salamanca, capture of Madrid and the Retiro, battles of Bittoria and the Pyrenees, besides various affairs and skirmishes on the advance and retreat of the army. He also served the Kandyan campaigns in 1817 and 1818 in Ceylon.

== Swan River colony ==
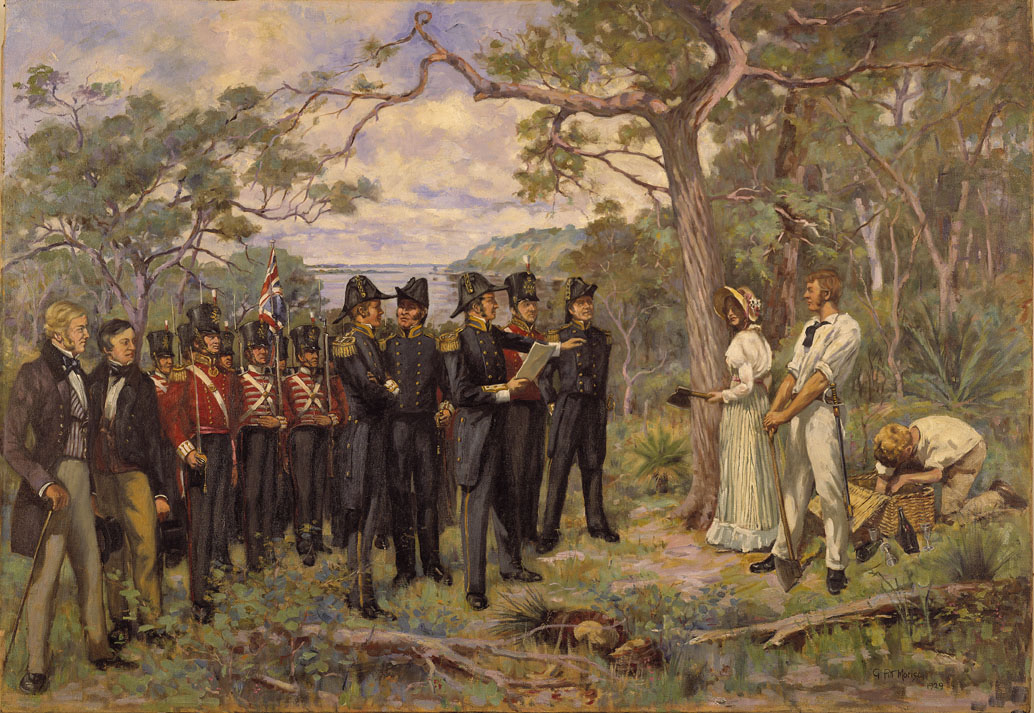
The Foundation of Perth. F.C. Irwin to the right of the Governor. First meeting of the Legislative Council

In 1828, the British government decided to establish a colony on the western coast of Australia, and a cousin of Irwin's, James Stirling, was appointed its first Lieutenant-Governor. Irwin was subsequently sent to the colony as a major in command of a detachment of the 63rd Regiment of Foot, whose mission was to protect and help establish the colony. He arrived with his men on board HMS Sulphur in June 1829 after a journey of three and a half months. They docked six days after the arrival of the first settlers and Stirling on the Parmelia. The detachment included explorer Robert Dale, who in January 1832 Irwin made his aide-de-camp when Dale was made redundant by the authorities in Britain.

Irwin was a cousin by marriage to William Henry Mackie, who arrived four months later. Mackie and Irwin acquired two large land grants in the new colony, jointly taking up 1,310 hectares (3,240 acres) at Henley Park in the Upper Swan and another 2,800 hectares (7,000 acres) between Beverley and York.

Irwin's position as officer commanding the troops afforded him the further position of Vice Chairman of the Legislative Council appointed by Stirling in January 1831. The Council consisted of Stirling, Mackie, Peter Broun and John Septimus Roe.

== Acting Governor ==
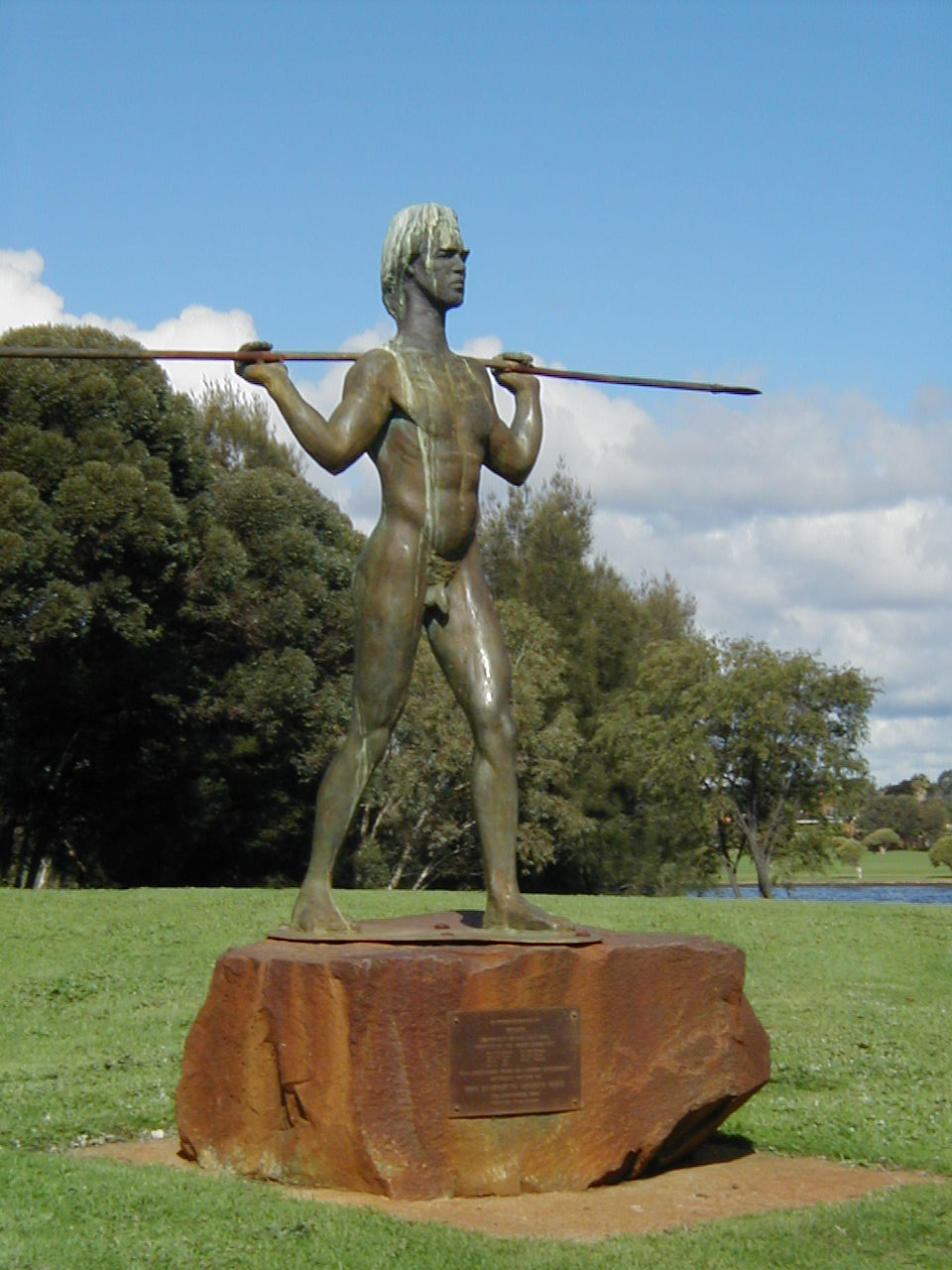
A bronze statue of Yagan that stands on Heirisson Island

From September 1832 until September 1833, Irwin was appointed Acting Governor of the Swan River Colony while Stirling was in the United Kingdom. At this time most pressing issue was conflict with the Noongar Wadjuk people of the Swan Valley. After settlers were killed, including two men at Bull's Creek in April 1833, Irwin's executive council declared Yagan, Midgegooroo (Yagan's father and a Noongar leader), and Munday outlaws, placing a bounty on their capture "dead or alive."

Midgegooroo was captured on the Helena River on 17 May 1833 and executed by firing squad five days later — with no trial. This "summary justice" inflamed tensions. Yagan, already outlawed alongside his father, vowed revenge and remained at large until he was fatally shot in July 1833 for the bounty on his head; he remains a hero to the Noongar people today.

Irwin later claimed the killings had so intimidated the local Aboriginal people that settlers had largely stopped carrying firearms — evidence, in his view, of how "peaceable" they had become. The following year, in October 1834, violence culminated in the Pinjarra Massacre.

== Return to the UK ==
In September 1833, after more than four years in Western Australia, Irwin returned to the United Kingdom, partly to give an account to the Colonial Office of the events that had occurred in the colony while it was under his charge. While there, he published The State and Position of Western Australia, the first published account of the colony. It provided an overview of the region's geography, the condition of the settlers, and local Indigenous populations intended to guide future emigrants. He also married Mary Russel(l) on 13 July 1834 in Strachan, Kincardineshire, Scotland. She died five weeks later on 26 August 1834 and they had no children.

While in the United Kingdom he also sought religious assistance for the colony. The Western Australian Missionary Society, formed in part by Irwin , appointed the Reverend Dr Louis Giustiniani to establish a Moravian-style mission. He arrived on Addingham on 26 June 1836.

Irwin's second marriage was to Elizabeth Courthope. They married on 28 December 1836 at Saint Clement Danes, Westminster, London. She was a sister of the auditor-general of Western Australia, Edward Lane Courthope. Irwin and Courthope had at least twelve children, nine of which who lived to adulthood.

== Second stint in WA ==
In 1837, having been promoted to Major, he returned to Western Australia with his family, and was made permanent Commandant of the Western Australian Forces. He was further promoted to Lieutenant-Colonel in 1845.

On the death of Governor Andrew Clarke in February 1847 (after whom he named one of his sons), Irwin for the second time took office as acting Governor of Western Australia. His administration was extremely unpopular with the settlers of Western Australia, due to both the poor financial state of the colony and his stern character. However, he created the General Board of Education (1847), which originated Western Australia's state school system, and addressed labour shortages by chartering a schooner to bring Chinese labourers from Singapore to Perth. The arrival of the new governor Charles Fitzgerald in August 1848 was widely celebrated.

A Military General Service Medal was presented to Irwin in 1848, and purchased by the State Government in 2000. The Medal includes nine bars or clasps representing the battles in which Irwin fought. It was purchased from Sotheby's London for the equivalent of just over $AUD10,000 and was on display at the State Museum.

== Later life ==
Irwin retired from the army in 1855 and returned to the United Kingdom in 1856, where he died in Cheltenham on 30 March 1860.

== Legacy ==
In 1839 the explorer George Grey, a friend, named the Irwin River after him while on his second disastrous exploration expedition along the Western Australian coast.

The Irwin Army Barracks (originally the Irwin Training Centre) in Karrakatta were ceremonially named on 5 December 1948 in recognition of his place in Western Australia's military history as the first military commandant. Prior to this, the area was known as Karrakatta Camp and was set-aside as a military training area by the Western Australian Colonial Government in 1895.

In 1991 the Frederick Irwin Anglican School (originally Frederick Irwin Anglican Community School) was opened and named in honour of his contributions to Western Australia.

The Shire of Irwin, and Irwin Streets in Perth's central business district, Fremantle, and Leeming also all pay tribute to Frederick Irwin. There is also Irwin Street in Yarralumla, ACT.

A commemorative plaque was erected during the State's 150th anniversary at St George's Terrace that reads "1840 Major Frederick Chidley Irwin Commandant".

== Descendants ==
Frederick Courthope Irwin • Lieutenant of the British army • Born 31 Jan 1838, at sea (baptised Perth, WA, Aus) • Died 24 Aug 1861, Nasirabad, India — died of cholera aged 23	James Chamney Irwin • Born 9 Jul 1839, Guildford, WA, Aus • Married Mary Keeling (details unknown) • Died 9 Sep 1877, Wycheproof, Victoria
John Langhorne Irwin • Born 5 Apr 1841, WA, Aus • Married Mary Maloney; children: Emma Langhorne Irwin, Frederick Chidley Irwin • Died 12 Apr 1882, Echuca, Victoria	Sydney Graves Irwin • Born 1843, Upper Swan, WA, Aus • Died 6 Mar 1847, Perth, WA — meningitis, aged 4
Emma Jane Irwin • Born 1845, Upper Swan, WA, Aus • Married Rev. John Julius Baker, 1867, England; children: George Frederick Baker, Dr Clement John Baker, Caroline Elizabeth Baker, Arthur William Baker, Mabel Emma Baker, Sophy Conyers Baker, Francis Sidney Baker • Died 24 May 1923, Hawthorn, Sussex, Eng — resided in Little Hallingbury, Essex until husband's death, then moved to Sussex	Andrew Clarke Irwin • East India Merchant • Born 1846, WA, Aus • Married Anna Julia Baker, 1875, India (sister of Rev. J J Baker); children: Sidney Conyers Irwin, Guy Irwin, George Chidley Irwin, John Langhorne Irwin, Margaret Sophy Irwin, Elizabeth Julia Irwin, Margaret Emma Faith Irwin • Died 20 Feb 1902, Edmonton, Middlesex, Eng
Sidney Thomas Irwin • Schoolmaster • Born 1848, WA, Aus • Never married • Raised his niece Margaret after her parents died • Died 8 Sep 1911, Bristol, Eng	Elizabeth Mary Irwin • Born 1849, Henley Brook, WA, Aus • Married Frederick Haller Stevens, 1886, England — Stevens was a mathematics teacher who worked with Sidney Irwin • Died 12 Jul 1926, Bristol, Eng
Harriet Frances Irwin • Born 8 Jul 1851, Perth, WA, Aus • Never married • Died 29 Apr 1915, Bristol, Eng	Margaret Ellen Irwin • Born Apr 1853, Perth, WA, Aus • Died 22 Nov 1853, Perth, WA, Aus — aged 7 months
Arthur William Irwin • Born Jun 1854, Eng • Died 29 Nov 1854, Bath, Somerset, Eng — aged 5 months	Emily Agnes Irwin • Born Apr 1857, Eckington, Worcestershire, Eng • Married Thomas Hastings Henry Crossley, 1883, England — Crossley's mother was Elizabeth Helen Irwin; child: Guy Hastings Irwin Crossley • Died 3 Jun 1940, Eastbourne, Sussex, Eng

== General references ==
- The Constitution Centre of Western Australia (2002). "Lieutenant-Colonel Frederick Chidley Irwin 1847–1848". Governors and Premiers of Western Australia. West Perth, Western Australia: The Constitution Centre of Western Australia. ISBN 0-7307-3821-3.

Government offices
Preceded by Lieutenant-Colonel Andrew Clarke	Governor of Western Australia; 1847–1848	Succeeded by Captain Charles Fitzgerald
