= Andrew Clarke (British Army officer, born 1793) =

Governor of Western Australia 1846–1847

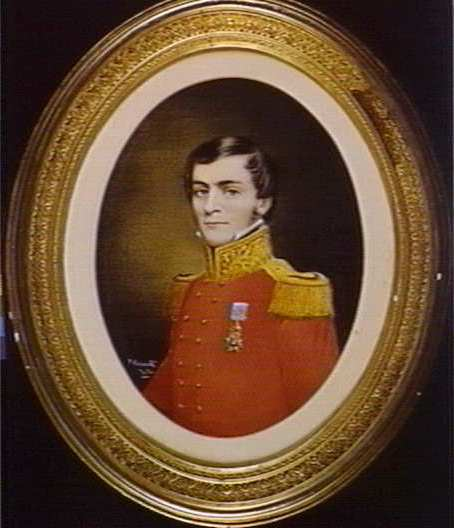
- Portrait of Andrew Clarke

Governor of Western Australia
- In office 1846–1847
- Preceded by: John Hutt
- Succeeded by: Frederick Irwin

Personal details
- Born: 1793 Donegal, Ireland
- Died: 11 February 1847 (aged 54) Perth, Western Australia

Lieutenant-Colonel Andrew Clarke KCH (1793 – 11 February 1847) was Governor of Western Australia from 1846 until his death in 1847.

Andrew Clarke was born in Donegal, Ireland in 1793. He entered the British Army as an ensign in the 8th West India Regiment (without purchase) at the age of 13 in 1806, and rose rapidly through the ranks. In 1808 he transferred to the 46th Foot as lieutenant, again without purchase. When he turned 18, he was given temporary command of the troops in Van Diemen's Land. In 1813 he became a captain and went to New South Wales with his regiment. In 1818 he lived in India, and in 1823 he married a widow named Frances Lardner whilst on leave in England. A son was born in July 1824. In 1825 he purchased a majority.

Andrew's Clarke's son, also named Andrew Clarke, held a number of important public positions for the colony of Victoria, and was for a time a member of its legislative assembly. For six years, he was the governor of the Straits Settlements in Malaya. His stepdaughter, Fanny Jackson, married George Fletcher Moore. Amongst his nephews was the Australian novelist and poet Marcus Clarke.

Government offices
Preceded by George Graydon	Lieutenant Governor of St. Lucia; 1843–1844	Succeeded by Arthur Wellesley Torrens
Preceded by John Hutt	Governor of Western Australia; 1846–1847	Succeeded by Lieutenant-Colonel Frederick Irwin
