= John Hutt =

Governor of Western Australia (1839–1846)

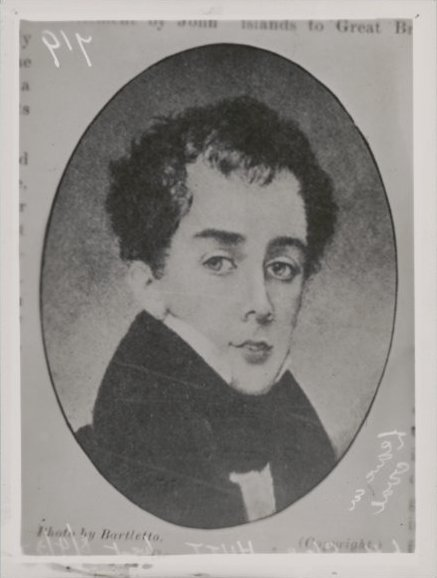
John Hutt, Governor of Western Australia

John Hutt (24 July 1795 – 9 April 1880) was Governor of Western Australia from 1839 to 1846.

== Life ==
Born in London on 24 July 1795, John Hutt was the fourth of 13 children of Richard Hutt of Appley Towers, Ryde, Isle of Wight. He was educated at Christ's Hospital, and in 1815 inherited Appley Towers. He is said to have lived extravagantly, and eventually found it necessary to sell his estate and enter the Madras Civil Service. When he did so is unknown, but in about 1830 he was collector of the North Arcot district. He later became Governor of North Arcot.

Along with his brother William Hutt, John Hutt was heavily involved in the arrangements for the establishment of the colony of South Australia. He was recommended to the position of first Governor of South Australia, but was instead appointed to succeed Sir James Stirling as Governor of Western Australia. He took office on 1 January 1839, holding the position until resigning his commission on 19 February 1846.

Politically a liberal, one of Hutt's first actions as governor was to increase the membership of the Western Australian Legislative Council by adding four unofficial nominees. He also oversaw many changes in the colony's land regulations, especially in the enforcement of the conditions governing land grants. It was said that "... the acts of the Governor at this time helped materially to save the infant settlement from utter disaster, even though eventually he may have erred on the side of over-caution."

Hutt's attitude to the Aboriginal peoples of Western Australia was notably different from that of both Stirling and most of the settlers. Relations between the settlers and the natives had deteriorated badly in the final years of Stirling's reign, with natives regularly spearing stock, robbing houses, and occasionally murdering settlers. Stirling's response was to attempt to subdue the Aboriginal people through harsh punishment. In contrast, Hutt implemented a policy of protecting the rights of Aboriginal people and educating them where possible, intending to integrate them into the British legal system so as to prevent extrajudicial conflict between Aboriginal Australians and settlers by having disputes and conflicts between them settled by way of the rule of law. His approach made him very unpopular with frontier settlers, who thought themselves more in need of protection than the natives. Hutt developed a personal interest in the languages and culture of the Aboriginal peoples, and helped fund George Fletcher Moore's book A Descriptive Vocabulary of the Language in Common Use Amongst the Aborigines of Western Australia.

In 1841, John Hutt founded the first Freemasons lodge in Western Australia, named the 'Lodge of St John' No. 485 under the English Masonic constitution, later becoming the first Lodge consecrated under the Western Australian constitution in 1901. The lodge still meets in the Perth suburb of Kingsley to this day.

After resigning as Governor of Western Australia, Hutt returned to England, where he apparently went through more money. He joined the Canterbury Association on 27 March 1848 as one of its first members, but on 29 March 1850 resigned both its chairmanship and membership. Edward Gibbon Wakefield dedicated his book Art of Colonization to Hutt. For a while he lived in Chelsea Hospital. He died, unmarried, in his brother's house on 9 April 1880.

== See also ==
- Historical Records of Australia

| Preceded by Captain James Stirling | Governor of Western Australia; 1839–1846 | Succeeded by Lieutenant-Colonel Andrew Clarke |
