= Charles Fitzgerald =

Irish military officer and civil servant

Captain Charles Fitzgerald CB
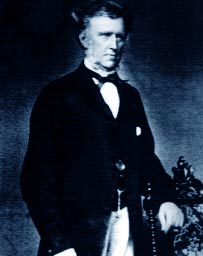

Governor of Western Australia
- In office 12 August 1848 – 22 July 1855
- Preceded by: Frederick Chidley Irwin
- Succeeded by: Sir Arthur Kennedy

Governor of The Gambia
- In office 9 December 1844 – 18 April 1847
- Preceded by: Edmund Nash Norcott
- Succeeded by: Sir Richard MacDonnell

Personal details
- Born: Unknown date, c. 1791 Kilkee, County Clare, Ireland
- Died: 29 December 1887 (aged 96) Kilkee, County Clare, Ireland

Military service
- Branch: HM Coastguard; Royal Navy
- Service years: 1809–1856
- Rank: Captain

Charles Fitzgerald CB (c. 1791 – 29 December 1887) was an officer in the British Royal Navy and Governor of The Gambia from 1844 until 1847, then Governor of Western Australia from 1848 to 1855.

Son of Robert Fitzgerald and Lucinda Jackson of Kilkee, county Clare, Ireland (then part of the United Kingdom of Great Britain and Ireland), Fitzgerald joined the Royal Navy in March 1809, passed his examination in 1815, and was commissioned in March 1826. While in the naval service Fitzgerald was assigned to the Royal Navy's West Africa Squadron which was tasked with interdicting the Atlantic slave trade, where he served with distinction.

Either during this time or possibly before, Fitzgerald became a staunch abolitionist and fierce opponent of slavery. In 1839 he seized two Spanish slave ships falsely flying the American flag. For legal reasons he escorted the ships to New York where the courts ruled them to be unlawful and Fitzgerald was allowed to take the freed slaves back to Sierra Leone. Severe weather resulted in a number of deaths during the return voyage. Subsequently Fitzgerald became involved in the notorious Amistad incident which was dramatized in the 1997 film Amistad; Fitzgerald was portrayed by actor Peter Firth. In 1840 he was sent home, promoted to the rank of commander and placed on half pay for medical reasons.

In 1844 Fitzgerald was appointed as the colonial governor of British Gambia. His three-year tenure as governor was largely unremarkable although he gained a reputation for being sympathetic to the native population and was seen as something of a reformist.

Fitzgerald's administration of Western Australia saw numerous public works projects and an active campaign to encourage immigration by both voluntary colonists and convicts. This resulted in a dramatic improvement in infrastructure as well as an increase in population from roughly 5,000 to 12,000 at the end of his governorship. Soon after his arrival in Western Australia in 1848, Fitzgerald accompanied Augustus Gregory on an expedition in the Northampton region where Gregory and his brother had discovered lead the year before. An encounter with Aboriginal people resulted in Fitzgerald being speared in the leg and at least three Aborigines shot dead.

Following his return to England, his tenure as governor was reviewed with satisfaction and he was made a Companion of the Order of the Bath in 1857. After which Fitzgerald retired to his home in Kilkee Ireland where he died on 29 December 1887 at 96, an unusually advanced age for the time.

The town of Geraldton, Western Australia, and the north Perth streets Charles Street and Fitzgerald Street were named after him.

== General references ==
- Mennell, Philip (1892). "Fitzgerald, Captain Charles" . The Dictionary of Australasian Biography. London: Hutchinson & Co – via Wikisource.
- O'Byrne, William Richard (1849). "Fitzgerald, Charles" . A Naval Biographical Dictionary . John Murray – via Wikisource.

Government offices
Preceded by Frederick Chidley Irwin	Governor of Western Australia; 1848–1855	Succeeded by Sir Arthur Kennedy
Preceded by Edmund Nash Norcott	Governor of The Gambia; 1844–1847	Succeeded by Sir Richard Graves MacDonnell
