= William Denison =

British colonial administrator (1804–1871)

Sir William Denison KCB
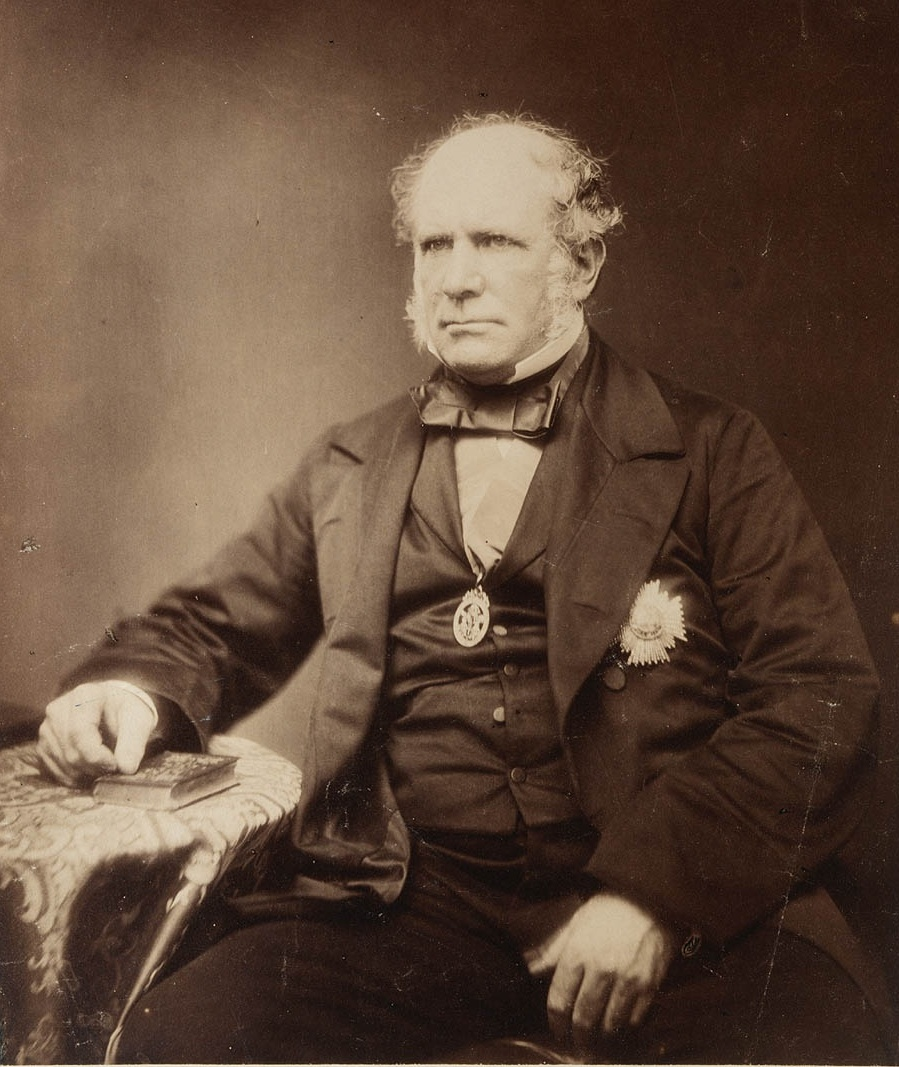
- Sir William Denison, Sydney, 1859

Governor of Madras
- In office 1861–1866
- Preceded by: William Ambrose Morehead
- Succeeded by: The Lord Napier

Governor of New South Wales
- In office 13 January 1855 – 21 January 1861
- Monarch: Victoria
- Premier: Stuart Donaldson
- Preceded by: Sir Charles FitzRoy
- Succeeded by: Sir John Young

Governor of Tasmania|Lieutenant-Governor of Van Diemen's Land
- In office 25 January 1847 – 8 January 1855
- Preceded by: Sir John Eardley-Wilmot
- Succeeded by: Sir Henry Young

Personal details
- Born: 3 May 1804 London, England
- Died: 19 January 1871 (aged 66) East Sheen, Surrey, England
- Spouse: Caroline Hornby
- Education: Eton College
- Alma mater: Royal Military Academy Sandhurst

Sir William Thomas Denison (3 May 1804 – 19 January 1871) was Lieutenant Governor of Van Diemen's Land from 1847 to 1855, Governor of New South Wales from 1855 to 1861, and Governor of Madras from 1861 to 1866.

== Early life ==
Denison was the third son of John Denison, of Ossington, M.P. for Colchester and his second wife Charlotte Estwick, his brothers were Evelyn Denison (1800–1873), the future Speaker of the House of Commons, and clergymen Edward Denison (1801–1854) and George Anthony Denison (1805–1896). He was born in London and studied at a private school in Sunbury before going to study at Eton College and the Royal Military College and entered the Royal Engineers in 1826 after spending some time in the Ordnance Survey. In November 1838 he married Caroline Hornby.

== Rideau Canal, Upper Canada ==
Lt. Denison was one of the junior Royal Engineers who worked under Lt. Colonel John By on the Rideau Canal in Upper Canada (1826–1832). Of note, Denison carried out experiments under the direction of Lt. Col. By to determine the strength, for construction purposes of the old growth Canadian timber in the vicinity of Bytown. His findings were published by the Institution of Civil Engineers in England who bestowed upon him the prestigious Telford Medal in silver.

He returned to England in 1831 and worked at Woolwich and as an instructor at Chatham from 1833. He worked at Greenwich observatory with Ramsden's zenith sector and in 1837 he was engineer in charge of Woolwich Dockyard. He was promoted to captain in 1841 and he visited Bermuda in 1842. In 1844 he worked with the royal commission on the health of towns. Denison was knighted for his work in the Admiralty in 1846.

== Governor of Van Diemen's Land ==
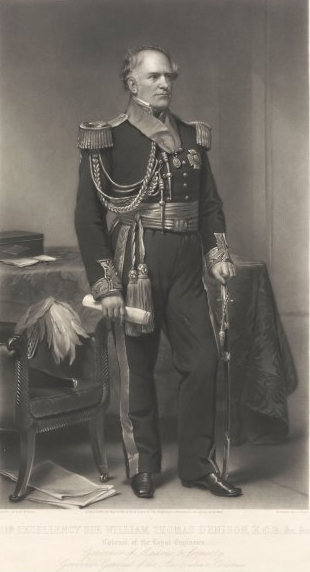
William Denison in official regalia

Denison was offered the position of Lieutenant-Governor of Van Diemen's Land in 1846 on the recommendation of Sir John Burgoyne, and arrived at Hobart on 25 January 1847. Six members of the nominee Legislative Council had resigned in protest over the costs of the prison system, which was partly borne by Tasmanians, and increased by the suspension of transportation to New South Wales. There had been a strong protest from members of the Anti-Transportation League and Sir John Eardley-Wilmot had been recalled for his failure to administer. Denison was told that no convicts would be sent so that he could fix the problem. The Tasmanian Legislative Council had no quorum. Due to difficulties in appointing replacements, Denison chose to rule without a functioning Council, even though this meant he could not pass legislation, including that needed to amend some local tax laws that were subsequently found to be faulty. He had a conflict with two judges that had arisen after a case of dog tax that John Morgan, the editor of Britannia had refused to pay. The case was taken to the Supreme Court where Chief Justice Pedder and Judge Montagu ruled that the local Act was contrary to the imperial statute which required the revenue to be set aside for use to specific local purpose.

In 1846, Grey's predecessor, Gladstone had suspended transportation of males to Tasmania for two years, and Grey had erroneously given the impression in dispatches to Denison that it would not be resumed, and Denison had passed this view on to the Legislative Council. Subsequently, the British Government began sending convicts in large numbers. The discovery of gold in Australia, reduced crime in England and the construction of prisons in England led to a decline in the convict transport and in 1852 Lord Stanley stopped the transport of prisoners to Van Diemen's Land and Denison closed the penal settlement on Norfolk Island.

== Governor of New South Wales ==
Denison was appointed Governor of New South Wales on 20 January 1855. In 1856, he became both Governor of New South Wales and "Governor-General in and over all our Colonies of New South Wales, Van Diemen's Land, Victoria, South Australia and Western Australia", a role intended to encourage co-operation between the colonies. In response to the Crimean War, he strengthened Sydney's defences, strengthening the batteries on Dawes Point and building Fort Denison. He successfully opposed the Colonial Office's initial decision to put New England and the Clarence Valley in the new colony of Queensland. In 1859, he appointed Queensland's first Legislative Council and began the process of electing a Legislative Assembly, inaugurated on 22 May 1860. While he opened the colony's first railway in 1855, he ignored the problem of different rail gauges despite his role as Governor-General, although he was more active in developing arrangements for paying for postal connections with the United Kingdom, ameliorating inter-colonial tariffs and co-operation over the provision of lighthouses.

Denison was responsible for closing the penal colony on Norfolk Island and for resettling the mutineers of the Bounty from Pitcairn Island. He initially instructed that the Island, except for certain public reserves would be vested in the Pitcairners, and was then forced by the Colonial Office to withdraw the vesting of land, leading to a lasting grievance.

== Governor of Madras ==
Denison's first work was to reorganize the Sepoy army after the 1857 rebellion. He opposed separate armies for Bengal, Madras and Bombay and the introduction of Indians into the legislative councils in the presidencies and provinces. He condemned any ideas of self-rule and representation by Indians. He also opposed competition for the civil services and insisted that officers were above all to be "gentlemen".

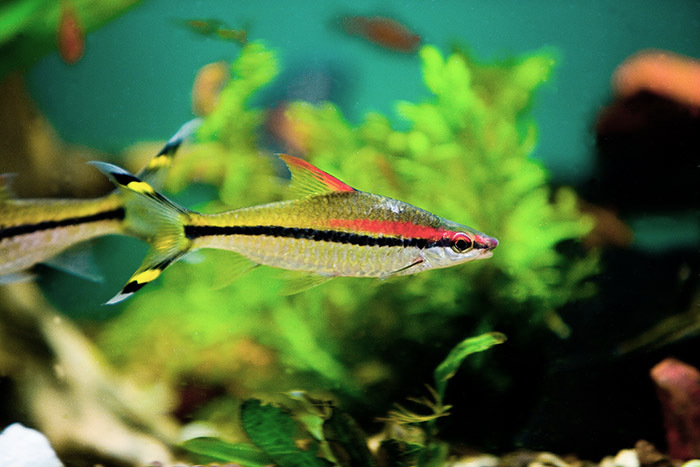
Denison's barb was named after him by Francis Day

He passed a town improvement act in 1865 and revised the land revenue assessment principles. During this period he recalled an order for the withdrawal of troops involved in the Sitana campaign.

In 1868 he chaired a royal commission to study the pollution of British rivers and held the post until his death. He died in East Sheen, Surrey and was survived by his wife Caroline Lucy, daughter of Admiral Sir Phipps Hornby, who he had married on 29 November 1838 (she died in 1899), six sons and four daughters (of thirteen children).

Denison took an interest in science and supported studies on the natural history of India. He corresponded with Sir Roderick Murchison but was a staunch Anglican Christian, anti-Darwinian and wrote an essay on the antiquity of man and a critique of Essays and Reviews.

== Honours ==
The Institution of Civil Engineers in the United Kingdom bestowed upon him the prestigious Telford Medal in 1837 for his paper on his experiments testing the strength of Canadian timber. He was one of the first recipients of this prize.

A federal and state electoral division in Tasmania were named for Denison. Port Denison (off the coast of Bowen, Queensland) was named after him.

== Taxa named in honour of Denison ==
Two Indian species are named after William Denison: a fish, the Denison barb (Sahyadria denisonii ), from the Western Ghats; and a plant, Impatiens denisonii, from the Nilgiri hills.

A genus of Australian venomous snakes, Denisonia, is named in honour of William Denison.

Government offices
Preceded by Sir John Eardley-Wilmot	Lieutenant-Governor of Van Diemen's Land; 1847–1855	Succeeded by Sir Henry Young
Preceded by Sir Charles FitzRoy	Governor of New South Wales; 1855–1861	Succeeded by Sir John Young
Preceded by William Ambrose Morehead	Governor of Madras; 1861–1866	Succeeded by The Lord Napier
Preceded by Sir Robert Napier (acting)	Viceroy of India, acting 1863–1864	Succeeded by Sir John Lawrence
