= Charles Augustus FitzRoy =

British Army officer and colonial administrator (1796–1858)

Sir Charles FitzRoy KCB, KH

11th Governor of Prince Edward Island
- In office 31 March 1837 – 2 November 1841
- Monarchs: William IV; Victoria
- Preceded by: John Harvey
- Succeeded by: George Wright

10th Governor of New South Wales
- In office 2 August 1846 – 28 January 1855
- Monarch: Victoria
- Preceded by: George Gipps
- Succeeded by: William Denison

Personal details
- Born: 10 June 1796 Derbyshire, England
- Died: 16 February 1858 (aged 61) London, England
- Spouse(s): Lady Mary Lennox (1820–1847); Margaret Gordon (1855–1858)
- Relations: 3rd Duke of Grafton (grandfather); Robert FitzRoy (brother)

Military service
- Branch/service: British Army
- Years of service: 1812–1825
- Rank: Lieutenant-colonel
- Unit: Royal Horse Guards
- Battles/wars: Napoleonic Wars; Peninsular War; Battle of Vitoria; Hundred Days; Battle of Waterloo

Lieutenant-Colonel Sir Charles Augustus FitzRoy (10 June 1796 – 16 February 1858) was a British Army officer, politician and colonial administrator who held governorships in several British colonies during the 19th century.

== Family and peerage ==
Charles was born in Derbyshire, England, the eldest son of General Lord Charles FitzRoy and Frances Mundy. His grandfather, Augustus FitzRoy, 3rd Duke of Grafton, was the prime minister of Great Britain from 1768 to 1770. He was notably a sixth-generation descendant of King Charles II and the 1st Duchess of Cleveland; the surname FitzRoy stems from this illegitimacy.

Charles' half-brother Robert FitzRoy would become a pioneering meteorologist and surveyor, Captain of HMS Beagle, and later Governor of New Zealand.

== Early life ==
Charles FitzRoy was educated at Harrow School in London, before receiving a commission in the Royal Horse Guards regiment of the British Army at the age of 16. Just after his 19th birthday, FitzRoy's regiment took part in the Battle of Waterloo, where as an extra aide-de-camp on Wellington's staff he was wounded. He travelled to Lower Canada with the Duke of Richmond in 1818. On 11 March 1820, he married Lady Mary Lennox (daughter of the Duke of Richmond), just after his promotion to captain. In 1825, he was promoted to the rank of lieutenant-colonel and appointed deputy adjutant general of the Cape Colony (now the Cape of Good Hope).

== Governor of Prince Edward Island and the Leeward Islands ==
Sir Charles was appointed as the eleventh Governor of Prince Edward Island off the coast of Canada on 31 March 1837, and was granted a knighthood just before his departure. He returned to England in 1841 and shortly afterwards was made Governor of the Leeward Islands in the West Indies until 1845.

== Governor of New South Wales ==
Sir Charles was chosen as the tenth Governor of the colony of New South Wales by Lord Stanley in 1845.

In 1847, Fitzroy served briefly as Governor of the Colony of North Australia, although his lieutenant-governor, George Barney had the main responsibility for establishing the new colony under FitzRoy's direction. His decision in 1847 to allow the building of a horse racing track in Parramatta was the catalyst for the creation of Cumberland Oval, a venue which hosted racing, cricket, and in the 20th century, motorsports, and was the location that Parramatta Stadium and further on the Western Sydney Stadium were built upon.

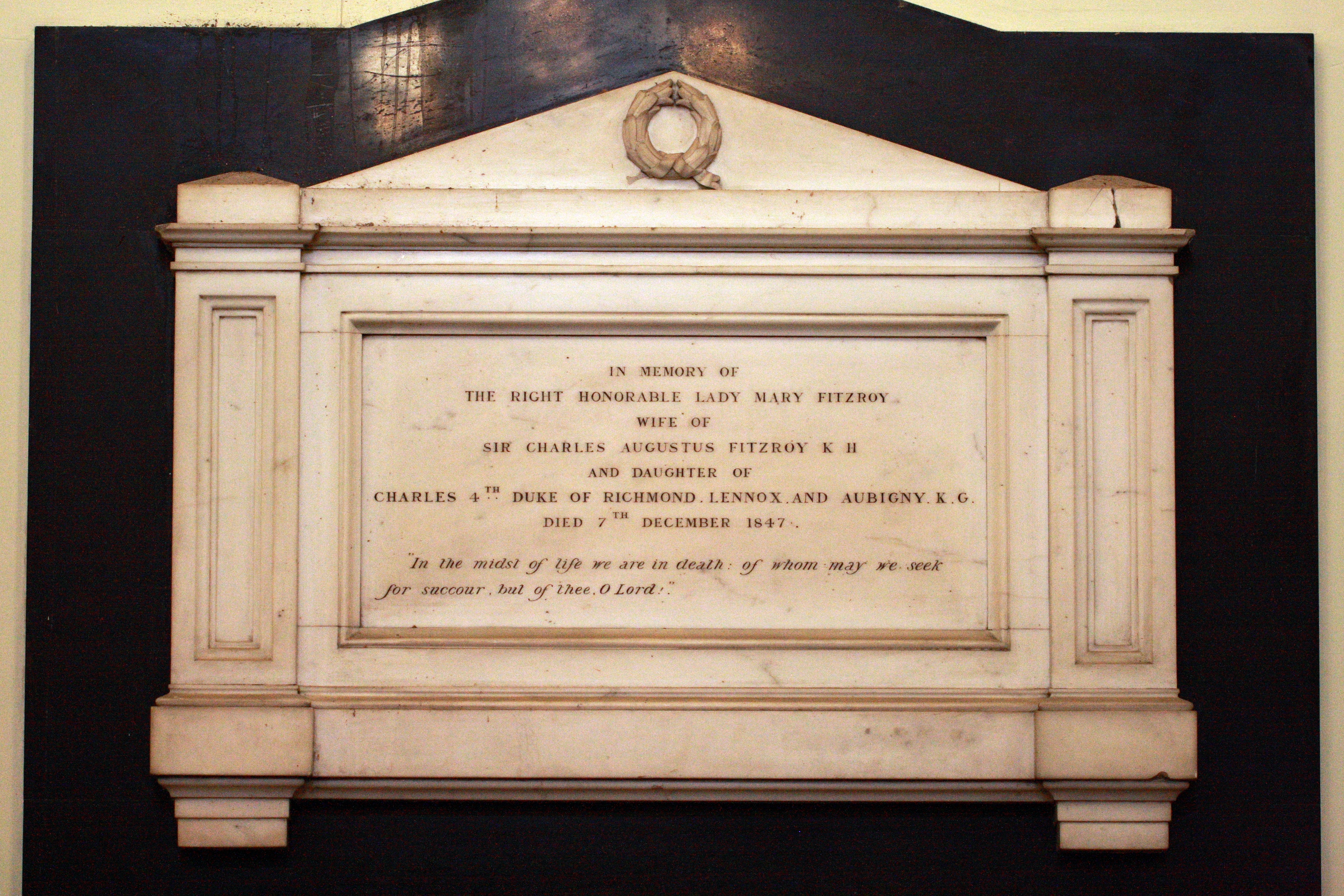
A memorial to Mary FitzRoy on the wall of St James' Church, Sydney

After sixteen months in the colony, Sir Charles' wife Mary was killed in a coach accident on 7 December 1847. A distraught FitzRoy considered resigning and returning to England, but his finances did not permit it. A memorial to Lady Mary FitzRoy is in St James' Church, Sydney.

In 1850, Governor FitzRoy received the gold miner and entrepreneur, Edward Hargraves after he had discovered traces of gold at Ophir, New South Wales.

In 1851 he named Grafton, New South Wales, after his grandfather Augustus FitzRoy, 3rd Duke of Grafton.

Sir Charles remained in New South Wales for eight eventful years, which saw many changes take place in the Australian colonies, not in the least being the first tentative steps towards Federation of the Australian states. In 1853, FitzRoy was appointed as Governor of Van Diemen's Land, South Australia and Victoria—a pre-Federation Governor-General of Australia, with wide-ranging powers to intervene in inter-colonial disputes.

== Later years and death ==
On 28 January 1855 he departed Australia and returned to England. On 11 September, his eldest son Augustus (a Captain in the Royal Regiment of Artillery) was killed in the Crimean War. On 11 December, he married Margaret Gordon (widow of a Melbourne land agent).

FitzRoy died in Piccadilly, London on 16 February 1858 at the age of 61.

== Family ==
Sir Charles Augustus FitzRoy married, firstly, Lady Mary Lennox (15 August 1790 – 7 December 1847), first-born child of Charles Lennox, 4th Duke of Richmond, on 11 March 1820. They had four children:

- Captain Augustus Charles Lennox FitzRoy (20 September 1821 – 11 September 1855)
- Mary Caroline FitzRoy (20 December 1823 – 22 November 1895) married Admiral Hon. Keith Stewart, son of The Earl of Galloway
  - Louisa Wilhelmina Stewart (1847–1938), married Kyrle Alfred Chapman, son of David Barclay Chapman and Maria Chatfield, did not have issue
  - Caroline Ethel Gertrude Stewart (1851–1947), married Canon Mark James, son of Philip James and Susan Georgiana Ryder, daughter of Granville Ryder, and had issue
  - Edith Stewart (died 1875), married Colonel Edward St. Aubyn, son of Sir Edward St. Aubyn, 1st Baronet and Emma Knollys, and had issue
  - Blanche Caroline Stewart (died 1927), married Admiral Sir William Shaw-Stewart, son of Admiral Sir Houston Shaw-Stewart and Martha Miller, and had issue
  - Ellinor Sydney Stewart (died 1901), married Spencer Chapman, son of David Chapman and Maria Chatfield, and had issue
  - Hilda Eugenia Stewart (died 1959), married Arthur Rhuven Guest, son of Arthur Edward Guest and Adeline Mary Chapman, and had issue
- George Henry FitzRoy (13 September 1826 – 8 July 1868)
- Commander Arthur George FitzRoy (20 March 1827 – 9 January 1861)

Lady Mary died from a carriage accident in Parramatta Park, outside Government House, in 1847. Within a year of her death, rumours were circulated about the colony of New South Wales about FitzRoy's 'womanising' ways. In 1850, FitzRoy made a visit to Berrima, to inspect the Fitzroy Iron Works. The Governor stayed at the Surveyor General's Inn, operated by former boxing champion Edward "Ned" Chalker (sometimes Charker). Ned's step-daughter, Mary Ann Chalker, who was 18 at the time, worked there. Nine months later, she gave birth to a son, named Charles Augustus FitzRoy, after his father, the Governor. This boy was later adopted by ex-convict John Fitzsimons and his family.

- Charles Augustus FitzRoy Fitzsimons (9 November 1850 – 19 July 1921)

Sir Charles Augustus FitzRoy married, secondly (after his return to England), Margaret Gordon, on 11 December 1855. There was no issue from this marriage.

== Notes ==
Parliament of the United Kingdom
Preceded by Earl of Euston; Earl Jermyn	Member of Parliament for Bury St Edmunds; 1831–1832; With: Earl Jermyn	Succeeded by Earl Jermyn; Lord Charles Fitzroy
Government offices
Preceded by Sir John Harvey	Governor of Prince Edward Island; 1837–1841	Succeeded by George Wright
Preceded by Sir William MacBean George Colebrooke	Governor of Antigua; 1842–1846	Succeeded by James Macaulay Higginson
Preceded by Sir George Gipps	Governor of New South Wales; 1846–1855	Succeeded by Sir William Denison
