= Parramatta (disambiguation) =

Parramatta is a suburb in Western Sydney, Australia.

Parramatta may also refer to:

== Places in Australia ==
- City of Parramatta, local government area
- Division of Parramatta, Australian federal electoral district
- Electoral district of Parramatta, New South Wales state electoral district
- Lake Parramatta, a man-made reservoir near Parramatta in New South Wales, Australia
- North Parramatta, a suburb of Sydney, New South Wales
- Parramatta ferry wharf, for RiverCat services, Sydney, Australia
- Parramatta Park (disambiguation)
- Parramatta railway station, on the Western, Blue Mountains and Cumberland lines, Sydney, Australia
- Parramatta River, an estuary in Sydney, New South Wales, Australia
- Westfield Parramatta, a shopping complex in Parramatta, New South Wales, Australia

== Sports ==
- Parramatta Power, National Soccer League club
- Parramatta Eels, Rugby League Football club
- Parramatta Stadium, a sports stadium in Parramatta, New South Wales, Australia

== Transportation ==
- HMAS Parramatta, a list of Royal Australian Navy ships that share the name
- Parramatta (ship), ships with the name Parramatta
- Parramatta (1866), a Scottish sailing ship that operated between Great Britain and Australia and America, 1866–1898

== Other uses ==
- Target-marking technique used by Pathfinder, during WW II
- Paramatta (moth), a snout moth genus in tribe Phycitini
- Parramatta cloth, a tweed cloth of the early 19th century

== See also ==
- Paramatta (disambiguation)
