= Parramatta (ship) =

At least two vessels have been named Parramatta (or Paramata, or Paramatta), for Parramatta:

- Paramatta (1803 ship) was a schooner launched in 1798 in France. The British captured her in 1803. She sailed to Australia. There, she became the flash point that led to the Rum Rebellion and the military coup that overthrew Governor William Bligh. She was lost in 1808.
- Parramatta (1866) was a sailing ship launched at Sunderland that operated between Great Britain, Australia, and America from 1866 to 1898. She was the second-fastest Blackwall frigate. She originally carried wool from Australia to the United Kingdom. She foundered in 1898.
