= Frank McCallum =

Australian bushranger

Francis McCallum
- Born: Francis McNeiss McNeil McCallum; 1823; Inverness, Scotland
- Died: 10 August 1857; Melbourne, Victoria
- Other name: Captain Melville
- Status: Deceased (suicide)
- Conviction: Armed robbery
- Penalty: 22 years

Francis McNeiss McNeil McCallum (Captain Melville) (c. 1823 – 10 August 1857) was a Scottish-born Australian notorious bushranger during the early part of the Victorian Gold Rush in Australia.

== Transportation ==
After being convicted under the alias Francis Melville, McCallum was transported to Tasmania (then known as Van Diemen's Land) by the Minerva, in 1838 (aged 15), having been convicted at Perth on 3 October 1836, of house breaking, and sentenced to seven years' transportation.

The convict records show that whilst Melville was under sentence he was exceedingly insubordinate, so much so that his sentence was extended to life. He continued to regularly appear before the magistrate up until late 1850. Somehow he managed to escape and arrived in Melbourne about October 1851.

== Bushranging ==
During 1852 as Captain Melville he was alleged to have led a large band of bushrangers on the roads in the Black Forest between Melbourne and Bendigo, and gained a folkloric reputation through the boldness of his outrages and the chivalry he showed to many, especially women. His name was associated with the Nelson robbery and St Kilda Road robberies, probably without foundation as in reality he seems to have spent most of his time bailing up diggers around Mount Macedon, either on his own or with one or two mates.

On Christmas Eve 1852, when under the alias Thomas Smith, he and fellow bushranger William Robert Roberts were arrested at a brothel in Corio Street, Geelong, and eventually faced Judge Redmond Barry at the Geelong Circuit Court on 3 February 1853 on three counts of robbery. Barry sentenced both men to twelve, ten and ten years on each count, respectively – in Melville's case to be served consecutively.

Although employed in chains on the roads of Victoria by the time of the Melbourne Private Escort Robbery of 20 July 1853, Captain Melville's name has become associated with it over the years because of the coincidence of one of the Escort robbers, George Melville, using the same surname as his alias.

On 22 October 1856 he was one of a party of prisoners based on the prison hulk Success in Port Phillip Bay who attempted to seize and escape in a boat, during which a warden (Owen Owens) and a fellow convict (Stephens) died. Stephens had jumped overboard and drowned. Sentenced to death but overturned because all prisoners involved all claimed that Stephens stuck the killer blow thus creating doubt. Melville was then sent to Old Melbourne Gaol. In late July 1857 he attacked Mr Wintle, the governor of the gaol with a sharped spoon causing a deep cut behind Mr Wintle's ear.

== Suicide ==
Melville had been found dead in his bed on 10 August 1857 with a large handkerchief tied around his neck. It would have been a slow death. There was a handkerchief about two yards in length twisted very tightly around his neck, the first turn being made as a slip knot. It was afterwards turned round very tightly, and the end tucked in under the folds. The cause of death was suffocation caused by the handkerchief round the neck. There is very little doubt that the handkerchief was applied by the deceased himself.

== Popular culture ==
- Outlawry Under the Gums (1933) - radio series

== See also ==
- Frank Clune, author of Captain Melville (1945)
