= List of shipwrecks in August 1853 =

The list of shipwrecks in August 1853 includes ships sunk, foundered, wrecked, grounded, or otherwise lost during August 1853.

== 1 August ==
List of shipwrecks: 1 August 1853
Ship	State	Description
Douglas	United Kingdom	The schooner was driven ashore east of Folkestone, Kent. She was on a voyage from Ipswich, Suffolk to Portsmouth, Hampshire. She was refloated and resumed her voyage.
Fatal Oheb	(United Kingdom of Great Britain and Ireland) Straits Settlements	The ship was wrecked in the Sapudi Islands, Netherlands East Indies. Her crew were rescued. She was on a voyage from Melbourne, Victoria to Singapore.
Napoleon	(United Kingdom of Great Britain and Ireland) Victoria	The ship was wrecked in the Sapudi Islands. Her crew were rescued. She was on a voyage from Melbourne to Singapore.
Tagus	United Kingdom	The ship was wrecked near Tranum, Denmark. Her crew were rescued. She was on a voyage from South Shields, County Durham to Kronstadt, Russia.

== 2 August ==
List of shipwrecks: 2 August 1853
Ship	State	Description
Andreas	Hamburg	The barque was driven ashore and damaged at the Old Head of Kinsale, County Cork, United Kingdom. She was on a voyage from British Honduras to Queenstown, County Cork. She was refloated and taken in to Queenstown.
Melody	United States	The barque was driven ashore at Cape St. Mary. She was on a voyage from the Ilha do Sal, Cape Verde Islands to Montevideo, Uruguay.
Orbit	United Kingdom	The brig ran aground on the Holme Sand, in the North Sea off the coast of Suffolk. She was refloated and taken in to Lowestoft in a leaky condition.
Royale Supreme	France	The sloop was abandoned in the North Sea and sank. Her crew were rescued by the brig Alert (United Kingdom). Royal Supreme was on a voyage from Sunderland, County Durham, United Kingdom to Bordeaux, Gironde.

== 3 August ==
List of shipwrecks: 3 August 1853
Ship	State	Description
Asa Thor	United States	The brig sprang a leak and was beached on Guam, where she became a wreck. Her crew were rescued. She was on a voyage from Hong Kong to Ascension Island.
Bornœuf	United Kingdom	The full-rigged ship was wrecked in the Torres Strait off Booby Island, New South Wales with the loss of eight lives. Survivors were rescued by four vessels:- Earl Grey (United Kingdom), Everdina Elizabeth (Netherlands) and two other Dutch vessels. Bornœuf was on a voyage from Sydney, New South Wales to Bombay, India.
Gemini	United Kingdom	The ship was wrecked on a reef off Dog Island, Anguilla. All on board were rescued. She was on a voyage from Saint Vincent to London.
Jeune Rose	France	The ship ran aground on the Gunfleet Sand, in the North Sea off the coast of Suffolk, United Kingdom. She was on a voyage from Seaham, County Durham, United Kingdom to Livorno, Grand Duchy of Tuscany. She was refloated and taken in to Harwich, Essex in a leaky condition.

== 4 August ==
List of shipwrecks: 4 August 1853
Ship	State	Description
Maria	United Kingdom	The ship ran aground and was severely damaged at Milford Haven, Pembrokeshire. She was on a voyage from Milford Haven to Quebec City, Province of Canada, British North America.
St. Roch	United Kingdom	The steamship was in collision with the steamship Lady Elgin and sank at Cap-de-la-Madeleine, Province of Canada, British North America. Her crew were rescued.

== 5 August ==
List of shipwrecks: 5 August 1853
Ship	State	Description
Jeune France	United Kingdom	The ship put into Key West, Florida, United States in a leaky condition, having run aground. She was on a voyage from New Orleans, Louisiana, United States to Senegal. She was placed under repair, but was consequently condemned.
Panola	United Kingdom	The ship ran aground at Bombay, India. She was on a voyage from Port Phillip, Victoria to Bombay.
Stata	United Kingdom	The ship ran aground on the Great Barrier Reef and capsized. Her crew were rescued. She was on a voyage from Port Phillip to Singapore.
Susan	United Kingdom	The ship was driven ashore at the mouth of the Narva River. Her crew were rescued. She was consequently condemned.

== 6 August ==
List of shipwrecks: 6 August 1853
Ship	State	Description
Melbourne	United Kingdom	The ship was driven ashore on Anticosti Island, Nova Scotia, British North America. She was on a voyage from Quebec City, Province of Canada, British North America to Liverpool, Lancashire.

== 7 August ==
List of shipwrecks: 7 August 1853
Ship	State	Description
HMS Caesar	Royal Navy	The Caesar-class ship of the line ran aground on being launched at Pembroke Dockyard, Pembrokeshire.
Dockenhuden	Hamburg	The ship was wrecked on a reef in the Pacific Ocean. Her crew were rescued. She was on a voyage from Melbourne, Victoria to Batavia, Netherlands East Indies.
Little Pet	United Kingdom	The schooner was abandoned off the coast of Brazil. Her crew survived. She was on a voyage from Pernambuco, Brazil to Leith, Lothian. Little Pet was taken in tow by Ceres (United States) on 9 August. An attempt was made to take her in to Pernambuco but she was driven ashore and damaged. She was consequently condemned.

== 8 August ==
List of shipwrecks: 8 August 1853
Ship	State	Description
Hirondelle	France	The steamship was wrecked on the coast of Morocco near Ceuta, Spain.
Neptune	United Kingdom	The ship was driven ashore at Paimbœuf, Loire-Inférieure, France. She was on a voyage from Frederikshald, Norway to Paimbœuf.
Sandwich	United Kingdom	The brig was wrecked near the mouth of the Salt River, Cape Colony with the loss of a crew member. She was on a voyage from Akyab, Burma to London.
Therese	Kingdom of Hanover	The ship sank in the White Sea. Her crew were rescued. She was on a voyage from London, United Kingdom to Arkhangelsk, Russia.

== 9 August ==
List of shipwrecks: 9 August 1853
Ship	State	Description
Brown	United Kingdom	The schooner was abandoned 20 nautical miles (37 km) east south east of the Calf of Man, Isle of Man. Her crew were rescued by Edward and Ann (United Kingdom). Brown was on a voyage from Ardrossan, Ayrshire to Cardiff, Glamorgan.
Grange	United Kingdom	The ship was driven ashore near the mouth of the Guardiaro. She was on a voyage from Tarsus Ottoman Empire to Queenstown, County Cork. She had been refloated by 14 August and taken in to Gibraltar for repairs.
Nicolettes Minde	Flag unknown	The ship was wrecked on the Kentish Knock.
Solide	(Russian Empire) Grand Duchy of Finland	The ship capsized at Grimsby, Lincolnshire, United Kingdom.
William R. Hallett	United States	The ship was driven ashore at New York in a squall. She was later refloated.

== 10 August ==
List of shipwrecks: 10 August 1853
Ship	State	Description
Bell	United Kingdom	The ship ran aground and was severely damaged at Southwold, Suffolk. She was on a voyage from Montrose, Forfarshire to Southwold.
Dowson	United Kingdom	The ship departed from Alexandria, Egypt for a British port. No further trace, presumed foundered with the loss of all hands.
Xarifa	(United Kingdom of Great Britain and Ireland) New Zealand	The brig ran aground in the Western Channel. She was on a voyage from New Zealand to Melbourne, Victoria.

== 11 August ==
List of shipwrecks: 11 August 1853
Ship	State	Description
Eclipse	(United Kingdom of Great Britain and Ireland) New South Wales	The ship ran aground at Geelong, Victoria. She was on a voyage from Sydney to Melbourne, Victoria.
Joven Emilio	Spain	The ship foundered. Her crew were rescued. She was on a voyage from Havana, Cuba to Gijón.
Oceanica	(United Kingdom of Great Britain and Ireland) Van Diemen's Land	The ship ran aground at Geelong. She was on a voyage from Hobart to Melbourne.
Oliver	United States	The brig was destroyed by fire in the Mediterranean Sea off Gorgona, Grand Duchy of Tuscany. Her crew were rescued by the steamship Virgilio (Flag unknown).
Sybil	(United Kingdom of Great Britain and Ireland) Van Diemen's Land	The ship ran aground at Geelong. She was on a voyage from Hobart to Melbourne.
Uncle Tom	(United Kingdom of Great Britain and Ireland) New South Wales	The ship ran aground at Geelong. She was on a voyage from Sydney to Melbourne.

== 12 August ==
List of shipwrecks: 12 August 1853
Ship	State	Description
Cremona	(United Kingdom of Great Britain and Ireland) Victoria	The schooner was driven ashore near the mouth of the Tarwin River. Her crew were rescued. She was on a voyage from Melbourne to Launceston, Van Diemen's Land.
Thomas Pierson	United Kingdom	The schooner was lost on this date. Her passengers were rescued. She was on a voyage from New Orleans, Louisiana, United States to Belize City, British Honduras.

== 13 August ==
List of shipwrecks: 13 August 1853
Ship	State	Description
Bluff City, Dr. Franklin No. 2, and Highland	(United Kingdom of Great Britain and Ireland) British North America	The steamships Bluff City and Dr. Frankin No. 2 were destroyed by fire at Quebec City, Province of Canada. The steamship Highland was severely damaged.
Forsoget	Norway	The schooner was in collision with the barque Barica ( Trieste) and sank in the English Channel off the coast of Sussex, United Kingdom. Her crew were rescued. She was on a voyage from Cardiff, Glamorgan, United Kingdom to Fredrikshald.
Mercator	United Kingdom	The ship departed from Havana, Cuba for Cowes, Isle of Wight. No further trace, presumed foundered with the loss of all hands.
Ploughboy	United Kingdom	The ship was sighted whilst on a voyage from Laguna to Liverpool, Lancashire. No further trace, presumed foundered with the loss of all hands.
Princess Victoria	United Kingdom	The ship caught fire, exploded and sank in the Pacific Ocean. Her crew were rescued. She was on a voyage from London to Melbourne, Victoria.
Triumph	United Kingdom	The ship ran aground on the Storholm Reef, in the Baltic Sea off the coast of Gotland, Sweden. She was on a voyage from Kronstadt, Russia to Grimsby, Lincolnshire. She was refloated and taken in to Slitohamn for repairs.
Vancouver	Hudson's Bay Company	The schooner was lost off Rose Point, Queen Charlotte Island. Her crew were rescued. She was on a voyage from Vancouver Island to Fort Simpson.

== 14 August ==
List of shipwrecks: 14 August 1853
Ship	State	Description
Helen	United Kingdom	The ship ran aground in the Thanlwin. She was on a voyage from Moulmein, Burma to a British port. She was refloated and resumed her voyage.
Niobe	United Kingdom	The steamboat was in collision with Regent (United Kingdom) and sank in the River Thames at London Bridge, London. Her crew survived. She was on a voyage from London to Woolwich, Kent.

== 15 August ==
List of shipwrecks: 15 August 1853
Ship	State	Description
Freeman	United Kingdom	The ship was driven ashore at the mouth of the "Becca Grande", Florida, United States. She was on a voyage from Jamaica to Liverpool, Lancashire. She was later refloated and taken in to Key West, Florida.
Limena	United Kingdom	The ship departed from Mayaquez, Puerto Rico for Queenstown, County Cork. No further trace, presumed foundered with the loss of all hands.
Marie Caroline	France	The ship departed from a port in Cuba. No further trace, presumed foundered with the loss of all hands.

== 17 August ==
List of shipwrecks: 17 August 1853
Ship	State	Description
Alexander	United Kingdom	The ship ran aground at Riga, Russia. She was refloated but consequently put in to Bolderāja in a sinking condition. She was on a voyage from Riga to Grimsby, Lincolnshire.
Anna Watson	United Kingdom	The ship ran aground on the Blackwater Bank, in the Irish Sea and was abandoned. She was on a voyage from Liverpool, Lancashire to the west coast of Africa.
Germania	Flag unknown	The ship departed from Seville, Spain for London, United Kingdom. No further trace, presumed foundered with the loss of all hands.
Ludorf Theodorus	Russia	The ship struck the pier at Dunkirk, Nord, France and sank. She was on a voyage from Reni to Dunkirk. She was later refloated.
Magdalena	Flag unknown	The steamship ran aground and sank in a river. All on board were rescued. She was on a voyage from "Honda" to "Santa Martha".

== 18 August ==
List of shipwrecks: 18 August 1853
Ship	State	Description
Regent	United Kingdom	The ship was wrecked on White Island. Her crew were rescued. She was on a voyage from New York, United States to Quebec City, Province of Canada, British North America.

== 19 August ==
List of shipwrecks: 19 August 1853
Ship	State	Description
Augustine	United Kingdom	The ship ran aground on the Longsand, in the North Sea off the coast of Essex, United Kingdom. She was on a voyage from Stettin to Havre de Grâce, Seine-Inférieure, France. She floated off and consequently sank.
Bananier	France	The ship was driven ashore on Zanzibar, Sultanate of Oman. She was on a voyage from "Lamoo" to Marseille, Bouches-du-Rhône. She was refloated on 1 September.

== 20 August ==
List of shipwrecks: 20 August 1853
Ship	State	Description
Baring Brothers	United Kingdom	The ship departed from Havana, Cuba for Plymouth, Devon. No further trace, presumed foundered with the loss of all hands.
Eugene et Léon	France	The ship departed from Havana for Havre de Grâce, Seine-Inférieure. No further trace, presumed foundered with the loss of all hands.

== 21 August ==
List of shipwrecks: 21 August 1853
Ship	State	Description
Breadalbane	United Kingdom	The three-masted barque was crushed by ice and sank in Lancaster Sound. Her 21 crew were rescued by HMS Phoenix (Royal Navy).
Re Davide	Flag	The ship departed from Constantinople, Ottoman Empire for a British port. No further trace, presumed foundered with the loss of all hands.

== 22 August ==
List of shipwrecks: 22 August 1853
Ship	State	Description
Coundon	United Kingdom	The ship was driven ashore at Hela, Prussia. She was on a voyage from Danzig to an English port. She was refloated on 26 August and put back to Danzig, where she arrived on 3 September.
Thetis	United Kingdom	The ship was driven ashore on the Droogden. She was refloated the next day and resumed her voyage to Saint Petersburg, Russia.
William	United Kingdom	The paddle steamer was run into by the collier Sir John Easthope (United Kingdom) in the River Tyne, broke in two and sank. All on board, more than 40 people, were rescued. William was refloated on 27 August.

== 23 August ==
List of shipwrecks: 23 August 1853
Ship	State	Description
Hannah More	United Kingdom	The ship was driven ashore and wrecked at Riga, Russia. Her crew were rescued.
Marie Françoise	France	The ship departed from Martinique for Newfoundland, British North America. No further trace, presumed foundered with the loss of all hands.

== 24 August ==
List of shipwrecks: 24 August 1853
Ship	State	Description
Janet Izat	United Kingdom	The ship struck a sunken rock off the Filsand, in the Baltic Sea and was damaged. She put in to Kronstadt, Russia.
Jessie Smith	United Kingdom	The ship was wrecked at the Orange River, Cape Colony with the loss of four crew.
Meridian	United Kingdom	The ship was wrecked on Île Amsterdam with the loss of three lives. Survivors were rescued on 4 September. She was on a voyage from London to Sydney, New South Wales.

== 25 August ==
List of shipwrecks: 25 August 1853
Ship	State	Description
Claudine Marguerite Pauline	United Kingdom	The ship was departed from Riga, Russia for Dundee, Forfarshire. No further trace, presumed foundered with the loss of all hands.
Hero	United Kingdom	The smack was abandoned in the North Sea off Rattray Head, Aberdeenshire. She was on a voyage from Peterhead, Aberdeenshire to Cullen, Moray. She subsequently came ashore and was wrecked.
James	United Kingdom	The schooner ran aground at Ferryden, Forfarshire. She was refloated
Maria Bertha	United Kingdom	The ship was driven ashore and sank at Kronstadt, Russia. She was on a voyage from Stockton-on-Tees, County Durham to Kronstadt. She was refloated on 5 September and taken in to Kronstadt.

== 26 August ==
List of shipwrecks: 1853
Ship	State	Description
Aurora	Norway	The galeas was lost on the Dogger Bank. Her crew were rescued.
Australia	United Kingdom	The ship was driven ashore and wrecked at Shoreham-by-Sea, Sussex. She was on a voyage from Grimsby, Lincolnshire to Rio de Janeiro, Brazil.
Brenda	United Kingdom	The brig sprang a leak in the English Channel. She was beached and damaged at Newhaven, Sussex. Her ten crew were rescued by the Coast Guard using rocket apparatus. Brenda was on a voyage from Quebec City, Province of Canada, British North America to Newhaven. She was refloated and taken in to Newhaven on 3 September.
Cherokee	United States	The steamship was destroyed by fire at New York.
Fingalton	United Kingdom	The ship was driven ashore on Sully Island, Glamorgan. She was on a voyage from Quebec City to Gloucester. She was refloated on 7 September and tale in the River Avon.
Friendship	United Kingdom	The ship ran aground on the Sable Island Bank and foundered. Her crew were rescued. She was on a voyage from Sunderland, County Durham to New York, United States.
Gabriel	Kingdom of the Two Sicilies	The ship was driven ashore at Ramsgate, Kent, United Kingdom. She was on a voyage from Newcastle upon Tyne, Northumberland, United Kingdom to Naples.
Lady Ann	United Kingdom	The ship was driven ashore at "Kilcliff", County Down. She was on a voyage from Workington, Cumberland to Drogheda, County Louth.
Lady Stewart	United Kingdom	The ship ran aground off Waterford. She was on a voyage from Waterford to Dungarvan, County Waterford.
Maria	Greece	The brig was driven ashore at Cardiff, Glamorgan, United Kingdom. She was on a voyage from Belfast, County Antrim to Cardiff.
Maria Bertha	United Kingdom	The ship was driven ashore and sank at Kronstadt, Russia.
Marmion, or Mary Ann	United Kingdom	The ship was wrecked on the Newcombe Sand, in the North Sea off the coast of Suffolk. Her crew were rescued. She was on a voyage from Danzig to Gloucester.
Massachusetts	United States	The ship was driven ashore and severely damaged on Sully Island, Glamorgan. She was on a voyage from Newport, Monmouthshire, United Kingdom to New York.
Patience	United Kingdom	The smack was in collision with the schooner Iduna (Norway) in the English Channel off the coast of Sussex and was abandoned. Her crew were rescued.
William and Ann	United Kingdom	The ship foundered off the Sizewell Bank, in the North Sea off the coast of Suffolk. Her crew were rescued. She was on a voyage from Goole, Yorkshire to Southampton, Hampshire.

== 27 August ==
List of shipwrecks: 27 August 1853
Ship	State	Description
Dantzig	Russia or Norway	The full-rigged ship ran aground at Manzanilla, Trinidad. she was on a voyage from Manzanilla to London, United Kingdom.
Favourite	United Kingdom	The sloop was driven ashore Whitstable, Kent. She was on a voyage from London to Alderney, Channel Islands. Favourite was refloated and taken in to Whitstable, where she sank. She was raised the next day.
Kingston	United Kingdom	The ship was driven ashore at "Pwllchion", Pembrokeshire.
Onderneming	Netherlands	The ship was driven ashore between Egmond aan Zee and Wijk aan Zee, North Holland with the loss of two of her crew. She was on a voyage from Sunderland, County Durham, United Kingdom to Vlissingen, Zeeland.
William	United Kingdom	The smack ran aground on the Great Burbo Bank, in Liverpool Bay. She was on a voyage from Wick, Caithness to Liverpool, Lancashire.

== 28 August ==
List of shipwrecks: 28 August 1853
Ship	State	Description
Asia	United Kingdom	The ship was driven ashore and wrecked on Sand Island, Alabama, United States. She was on a voyage from Mobile, Alabama to Queenstown, County Cork.
Cleopatra	United Kingdom	The ship caught fire and capsized in the Gut of Canso. Her crew were rescued by USS Decatur (United States Navy). She was on a voyage from Liverpool, Lancashire to Quebec City. Province of Canada, British North America.
Edward	France	The ship foundered in the English Channel off the Isle of Wight. Her crew were rescued by Nor (Flag unknown). Edward was on a voyage from Hartlepool, County Durham, United Kingdom to Nantes, Loire-Inférieure.
Elizabeth	United Kingdom	The brig foundered off the Danish coast. Her eight crew were rescued.
Fair Maid	United Kingdom	The ship ran aground at North Ness, Shetland Islands. She was refloated the next day.
Jane and Alice	United Kingdom	The ship was wrecked on the Salvo Reef, in the Baltic Sea off Fårö, Sweden. Her crew were rescued. She was on a voyage from Sunderland, County Durham to Kronstadt, Russia.

== 29 August ==
List of shipwrecks: 29 August 1853
Ship	State	Description
George	Norway	The ship was driven ashore and severely damaged at Plymouth, Devon, United Kingdom.
Java	United Kingdom	The ship capsized in the Kingroad.
Nancy	United Kingdom	The brig capsized in the Kingroad.

== 30 August ==
List of shipwrecks: 30 August 1853
Ship	State	Description
Antina	Netherlands	The schooner was driven ashore in the Dardanelles. She was on a voyage from Galaţi, Ottoman Empire to Falmouth, Cornwall, United Kingdom.
Peace	{{{flag}}}	The sloop was in collision with another vessel in the English Channel. She was taken in to Dieppe, Seine-Inférieure, France in a derelict condition.

== 31 August ==
List of shipwrecks: 31 August 1853
Ship	State	Description
Catania	Kingdom of the Two Sicilies	The ship was driven ashore at "Gallico", Sicily. She was on a voyage from Catania to Palermo and Belfast, County Antrim, United Kingdom. She was refloated and resumed her voyage.
Horatio	Bremen	The ship was wrecked on the Goodwin Sands, Kent, United Kingdom. Her crew were rescued. She was on a voyage from Odesa to Bremen.
Kirstine	Prussia	The ship ran aground off Kristiansand, Norway. She was on a voyage from Pillau to Leith, Lothian, United Kingdom. She was refloated and taken in to Kristiansand in a leaky condition.
Ocean	United Kingdom	The steamship ran aground at Dublin. She was on a voyage from Dublin to Holyhead, Anglesey. She was refloated the next day.
Spy	United Kingdom	The ship was driven ashore south of Kilmichael Point, Ireland.
Troubadour	Spain	The brig ran aground on the Kentish Knock. She was on a voyage from South Shields, County Durham, United Kingdom to Barcelona. She was refloated and taken in to The Downs. Troubadour was towed in to Southampton, Hampshire, United Kingdom on 5 September in a leaky condition.

== Unknown date ==
List of shipwrecks: Unknown date August 1853
Ship	State	Description
Alten	Sweden	The ship ran aground on the Kentish Knock. She was refloated and assisted in to Harwich, Essex, United Kingdom.
Argus	Netherlands	The ship was driven ashore at Arzila, Morocco before 9 August. She was on a voyage from Rotterdam, South Holland to Marseille, Bouches-du-Rhône, France. She was later refloated and taken in to Gibraltar for repairs.
Christophorus Columbus	Netherlands	The ship struck a sunken rock whilst on a voyage from Batavia to Onrust Island, Netherlands East Indies. She was consequently condemned on arrival.
Chrysalis	United Kingdom	The ship ran aground off Mayotte before 24 August. She was on a voyage from London to Calcutta, India.
Collector	United Kingdom	The ship foundered off Cape Clear Island, County Cork. Her crew were rescued. She was on a voyage from Callao, Peru to Queenstown, County Cork.
Croton	United States	The ship was abandoned in the South Atlantic before 4 August.
Curlew	United Kingdom	The ship ran aground in the Baltic Sea before 14 August. She was on a voyage from Riga, Russia to Grimsby, Lincolnshire. She was refloated and put in to Mandal, Norway in a leaky condition.
Diamond	United Kingdom	The smack was abandoned off Arran before 6 August. She was taken in to Lamlash, Arran by Happy Return (United Kingdom).
Edurac	France	The barque was driven ashore on the Holms. She was later refloated and taken in to Bristol, Gloucestershire, United Kingdom for repairs.
Fanny	United Kingdom	The ship was driven ashore in Lough Foyle. She was on a voyage from Londonderry to New York, United States. She was refloated on 8 August.
Fellowship	United Kingdom	The ship ran aground in the Gulf of Bothnia. She was on a voyage from Pori, Grand Duchy of Finland to London. She was later refloated and towed in to Helsingør, Denmark. She arrived on 29 August in a waterlogged condition.
Fortunato	Kingdom of the Two Sicilies	The ship caught fire whilst on a voyage from Catania to Falmouth, Cornwall, United Kingdom. She put in to Malta, where she sank. She was refloated on 3 August.
Frederica Gustava	Russia	The ship was driven ashore near Domesnes. She was on a voyage from Riga to Plymouth, Devon, United Kingdom.
Hoppet	Sweden	The schooner sprang a leak and sank in the Kattegat. Her crew were rescued. She was on a voyage from Grangemouth, Stirlingshire, United Kingdom to Fredriksvern, Norway.
Isabella	United Kingdom	The schooner was driven ashore at Rye, Sussex before 17 Augusts. She was later refloated and taken in to The Downs in a leaky condition.
Lady Eveline	United Kingdom	The ship was lost in the Pacific Ocean. Twenty-six people were rescued. She was on a voyage from Hong Kong to San Francisco, California, United States.
Leentje	Netherlands	The ship was driven ashore and wrecked on the coast of Portugal before 19 August. She was on a voyage from Trieste to Rotterdam, South Holland.
Madagascar	United Kingdom	The Blackwall Frigate departed from Melbourne, Victoria on 12 August. No further trace, presumed foundered with the loss of all hands.
Marie	United Kingdom	The full-rigged ship foundered in the Atlantic Ocean. Her crew were rescued by Marie (Spain). She was on a voyage from Lima, Peru to an English port.
Martin Luther	Flag unknown	The ship was lost off Osmussaar, Russia before 5 August.
Moses & John	United Kingdom	The ship was driven ashore on Læsø, Denmark. She was on a voyage from Sunderland, County Durham to Saint Petersburg, Russia. She was refloated and taken in to Helsingør, Denmark, where she arrived on 10 August.
Palendar	United Kingdom	The ship struck the Black Rock, south east of Grand Manan, Nova Scotia, British North America. She was on a voyage from Saint John, New Brunswick, British North America to the Clyde. She was later refloated and taken in to Westport, Nova Scotia in a severely damaged condition.
Richmond	(United Kingdom of Great Britain and Ireland) British North America	The schooner was wrecked on Saint Pierre Island. She was on a voyage from Newfoundland to Sydney, Nova Scotia and Charlottetown, Prince Edward Island.
