= Victoria Police Mounted Branch =

Mounted Branch
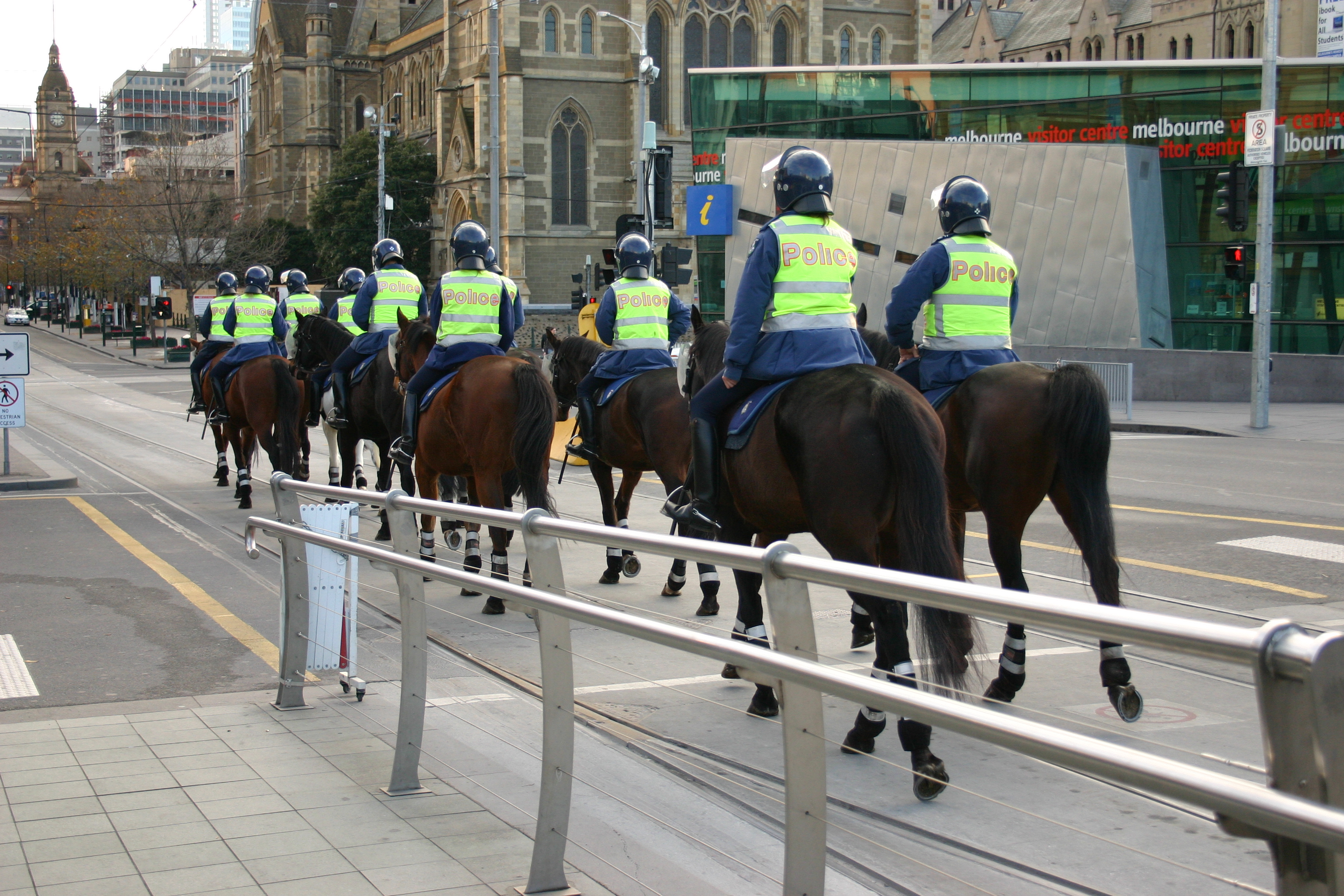
- Mounted officers patrol Melbourne CBD in 2005
- Country: Australia
- Agency: Victoria Police
- Type: Mounted police
- Part of: Specialist Response Division
- Headquarters: Attwood

Structure
- Sworn officers: 26

Equipment
- Animals: More than 20 horses

The Mounted Branch is the mounted police unit of Victoria Police who operate on horseback. The Mounted Branch can trace its origins to units formed more than 180 years ago.

== History ==
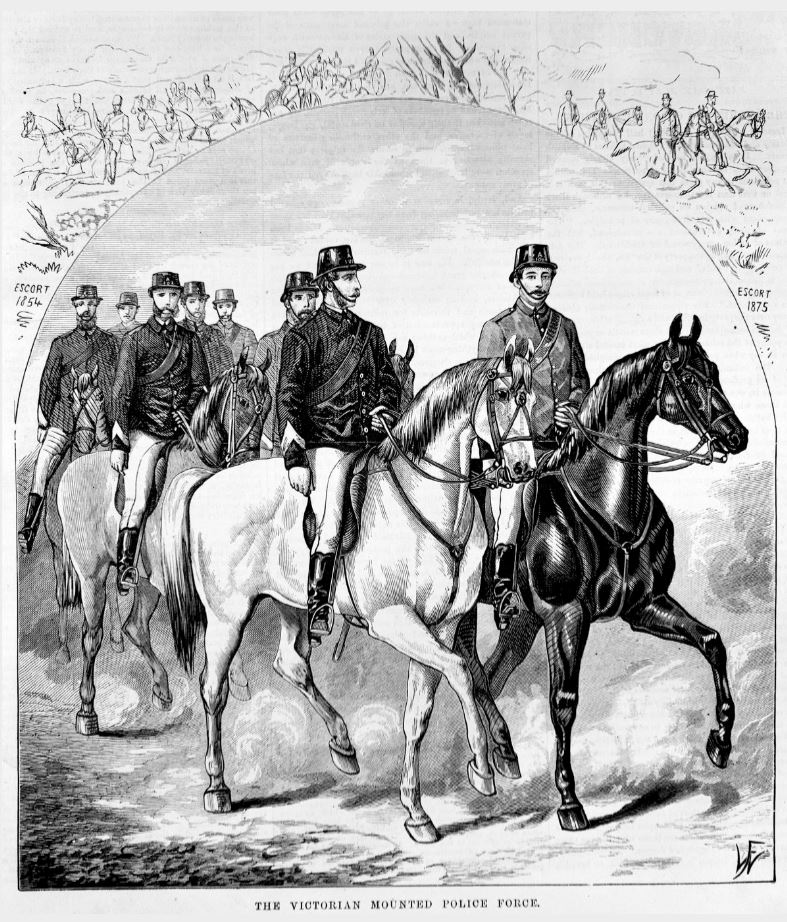
Victorian Mounted Police 1875

In 1836, police were appointed to the Port Phillip District part of New South Wales which was later to become the State of Victoria. The first mounted police unit was formed in 1838 the Mounted Police Fifth Division which consisted of soldiers from infantry regiments. Other mounted units were later formed as distinct units, including the Border Police in 1839 consisting of well-conducted prisoners. Victoria became a separate state in 1855; prior to this it had been a separate Crown colony from 1851. Victoria Police was formed in 1853 from several police forces, including the Gold Escort, the Water Police, the Mounted Police, the City Police (Melbourne), the Geelong Police, the Gold Fields Police and the Rural Bench Constabulary. The Victorian Mounted Police used the Dandenong Police Paddocks for their horses from 1851.

The early history of the unit saw the mounted police work on the Goldfields, relieving the British 40th Infantry, who were using horses to provide escorts to gold transports in 1857. Early police workforce social makeup was split in the Victorian Colonies. The foot police tended to be of Irish extraction, whereas the mounted police were ex military, from British Cavalry units. In the 1850s the mounted police were armed with both a sword and a carbine.

The unit later was later involved in activity against bush rangers of the period in Victoria including Frank McCallum ("Captain Melville"), Power and Ned Kelly and his gang. The service was seen as a sought after career by people at the time, with essential criteria for joining including that "one must be between 20 and 25 years of age, and at least 5 ft. 9 in. in height." Pay at the time, was "commencing at 6/6 per day, rises by gradation, to S/6 to 11/" The size of the force has varied over time. In 1899 it was 350.

In the early 1900s some of the unit were issued with bicycles instead of horses, as a cost saving measure.

In 1912, the Victorian Mounted Police headquarters moved to new purpose built stables at Southbank part of the Police Depot.

c. 1950, the name of the unit changed to the Mounted Branch.

In 1965, the last mounted police station closed. In the early 1900s, there had been 211 mounted stations throughout the state.

In 1974, policewomen were first appointed to the Mounted Branch with two mounted officers which by 1990 had increased to twenty mounted officers.

In 2006, the Mounted Branch ceased its own stud now either purchasing or accepting donated horses.

In 2016, the Mounted Branch moved to new purpose built stables at Attwood.

== Role ==
The role of the Mounted Branch includes:

- Patrols both day and night to provide a high visible police presence
- Crowd control at demonstrations assisting the Public Order Response Team, and at sporting events and major events
- Land searches over extended distances and in difficult terrain for missing or wanted persons assisting the Search and Rescue Squad
- Ceremonial duties

== See also ==
- Nerre Nerre Warren
- New South Wales Mounted Police
