= Paramatti =

Paramatti is an Italian surname. Notable people with the surname include:

- Lorenzo Paramatti (born 1995), Italian soccer player, son of Michele
- Michele Paramatti (born 1968), Italian soccer player, father of Lorenzo

== See also ==
- Paramatta (disambiguation)
