= Bushrangers on the St Kilda Road =

1887 painting by William Strutt

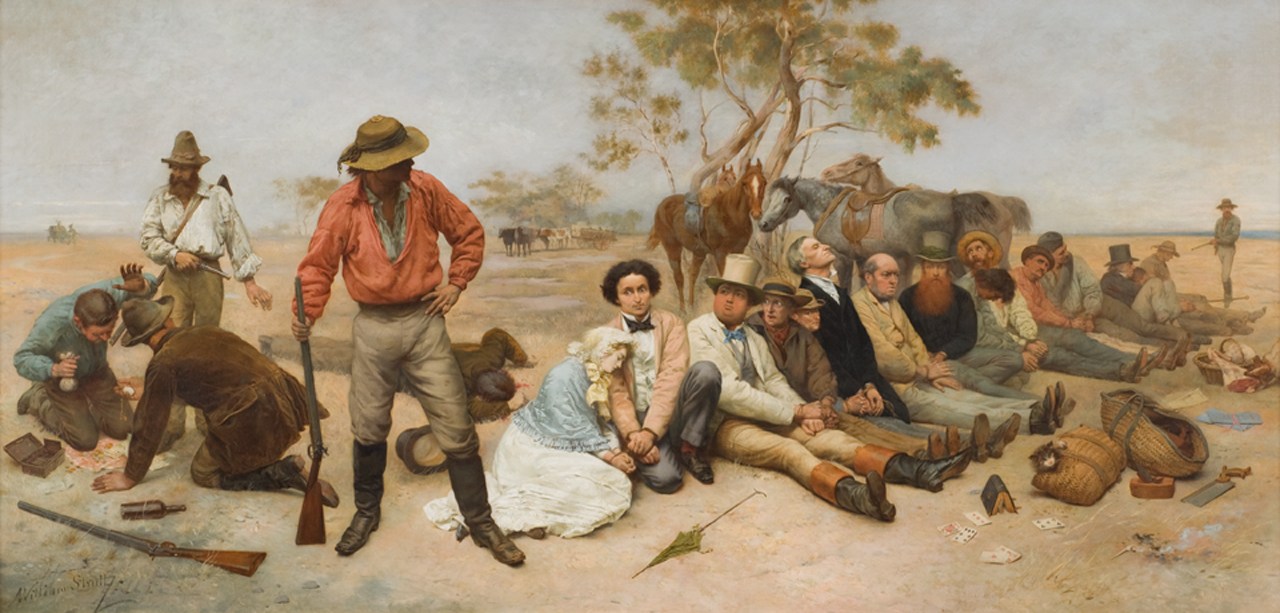
- Artist: William Strutt
- Year: 1887
- Medium: Oil on canvas
- Dimensions: 75.7 cm × 156.6 cm (29.8 in × 61.7 in)
- Location: Ian Potter Museum of Art, Melbourne

Bushrangers on the St Kilda Road is an 1887 painting by English-born artist William Strutt. It depicts a real robbery committed by bushrangers in 1852 on the St Kilda Road, in what is now the Melbourne suburb of Elwood. Strutt had lived in Melbourne from 1850 to 1861, and Bushrangers on the St Kilda Road is one of several Australian history paintings he completed after returning to England.

The painting is owned by the University of Melbourne and is held at the Ian Potter Museum of Art. It has been called one of the collection's "most studied and mythologised works".

== Background ==
During the 1850s Victorian gold rush, St Kilda Road was a track that ran through the scrub between Melbourne and the seaside settlement of St Kilda. In the early 1850s, bushrangers committed two major robberies in this area, the former of which inspired Strutt's painting.

This event took place over 2 1/2 hours in the afternoon of 16 October 1852, when 19 people were held up one by one or in groups, robbed, and tied up together at a spot near Glenhuntly Road, on the part of the road now known as Brighton Road that continues past St Kilda.

" The first victims appear to have been William Keel and William Robinson of Brighton who were driving in a cart down Brighton Road towards Brighton. After they had passed the St. Kilda racecourse and somewhere in the vicinity of Glenhuntly Road, they saw two men walking a little in front of them. There were two or three men with guns beside them, and they were looking in the trees, apparently for birds.

Suddenly Keel and Robinson were surrounded, with guns pointed at their heads and that of their horse. At first, when they were ordered out of the cart, they thought the whole thing was a joke. Then, when they were roughly told that their brains would be blown out if they did not hurry, they realized that it was serious, and got out of the cart. They were quickly robbed of £28 and £46 and ordered to take their cart into a nearby wattle thicket. Here a halter was cut in shreds and used to tie them together. They were ordered to sit on the ground while two men stood guard over them with double-barrelled guns.

At one stage the ring leader told the guard to put the victims together so that if he fired and missed one he would kill another. Mention was also made to one man already having been killed that after-noon and his body being put down a waterhole. However, no mention is made of his body in any of the reports. More people were robbed during the next few hours, until there were nineteen captives sitting in a ring in the bush, all tied together. ...

Finally, at sunset, the bushrangers withdrew their guard, mounted their horses which had been tethered in the bush, and rode off in the direction of South Yarra. Their victims released themselves and went on their ways. The gang seems to have comprised between four and six men, none of whom wore any disguise. There was much calling and cooeeing about the bush which confused their victims and possibly led them to believe that there were more men than was actually the case. Some days later five bushrangers, thought to be the same gang, spent an afternoon bailing up travellers near Dandenong."

Brighton Bushrangers, St Kilda Historical Society, 2015

No one was ever convicted.

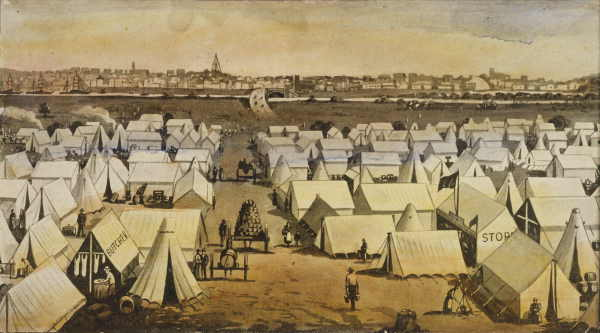
"Canvas Town" as depicted in the 1880s with the city in the distance.

The other event took place on 17 March 1853, on the road near Canvas Town, a temporary settlement of tents on the west side of St Kilda Road not far from the city which provided temporary accommodation for the thousands who poured into Melbourne each week during the gold rush in Victoria. Gold-buyer Edward Ritter and his brother-in-law Samuel Maxwell Alexander were riding in their chaise-cart from St Kilda to Melbourne. A gang of eight or nine men attempted to hold them up, but Ritter managed to pull away from the potential robbers. A volley of shots were fired, of which three hit Ritter in the legs, without causing any serious injury.

Ritter and Alexander furnished good descriptions of their assailants, two of whom had been amongst a similar group who had tried to rob Ritter about three weeks earlier, who he recognised. The government offered a reward of £1600, calculated at £200 per head, for their arrests leading to conviction, and the Melbourne police began to round up likely suspects. Seven men faced Justice Redmond Barry on 18 April 1853, five being convicted - Higginbotham, Little, Murphy William Burns, and James Burns - each sentenced to ten years' hard labour on the roads, the first two in chains. Two others, Thompson and James Grimes, were acquitted. Grimes had been arrested on suspicion of taking part in the Nelson robbery in 1852, but there had been insufficient evidence to convict him.

George Wilson, who was believed to be involved, was later hanged for the McIvor Escort Robbery.
