= Paramatta =

Paramatta may refer to:

- Paramatta, South Australia, a locality
- Paramatta, an alternative spelling of the Parramatta suburb of Sydney, Australia
- Paramatta (1803 ship), a schooner

== See also ==
- Parramatta (disambiguation)
