= Police paddock =

Police paddock is an Australian term for a plot of suburban land that has or has historically been set aside for police horses. Before the universal adoption of the motor car, police rode horses that were stabled and reared on paddocks that were adjacent to or near to police stations.

Mounted police units still exist and are frequently used for crowd control at public demonstrations. Many of the old police paddocks still bear the name "police paddock." Usage of the term is found in Queensland, New South Wales, and Victoria.

Police paddocks were an obvious place to play sports, and many suburban sports were played on police paddocks. Since the widespread use of horses has been abandoned, the paddocks became redundant, and many have been turned into sports stadiums or parks.

In Victoria, former police paddocks include the Melbourne Cricket Ground and the Nerre Nerre Warren, now called the Dandenong Police Paddocks Reserve, a nature reserve.
