= Cospatrick (ship) =

British ship destroyed by fire in 1874

Coordinates: 37°S 12°E

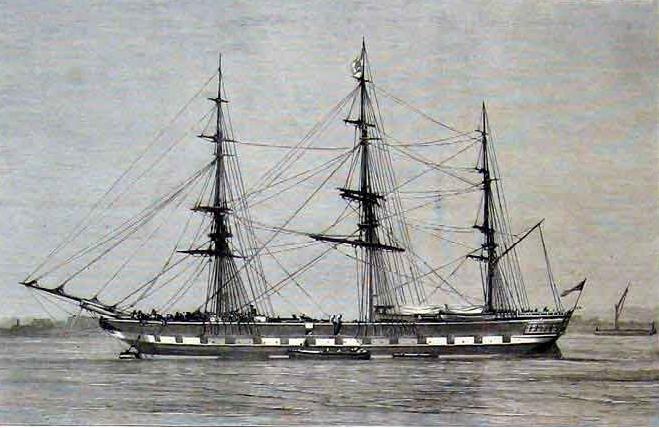
- The Cospatrick – The Graphic 9 January 1875, from a photograph taken just before she sailed from Gravesend

History

United Kingdom
- Name: Cospatrick
- Namesake: Gospatric, Earl of Northumbria
- Acquired: 1862 by Smith, Fleming & Co.
- Fate: Destroyed by fire south of the Cape of Good Hope in 1874

General characteristics
- Class & type: Blackwall frigate
- Tonnage: 1,199 GRT
- Length: 191 ft (58 m)
- Beam: 34 ft (10 m)
- Depth of hold: 23 ft 6 in (7.2 m)
- Sail plan: full-rigged ship
- Complement: 44

Cospatrick was a wooden three-masted full-rigged ship that caught fire south of the Cape of Good Hope early on 18 November 1874, while on a voyage from Gravesend, England, to Auckland, New Zealand. Of those aboard, only three survived. The disaster resulted in 470 deaths and is considered the worst maritime disaster in New Zealand's history, although it occurred outside New Zealand waters.

== History ==
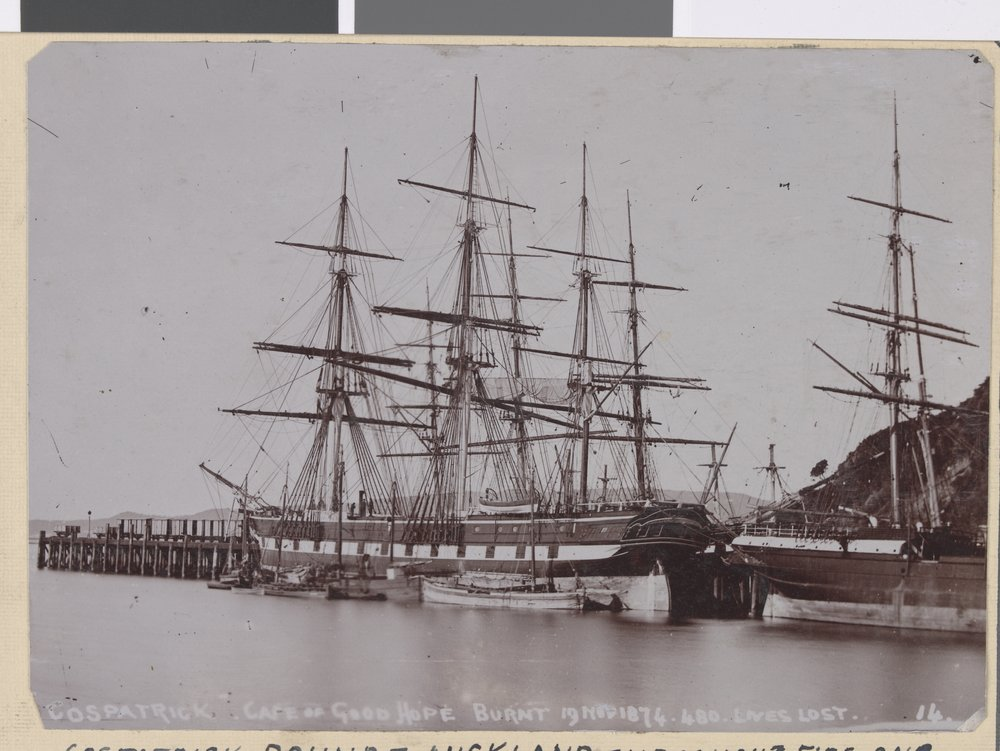
Cospatrick

Cospatrick was a Blackwall frigate built at Moulmein (now Mawlamyine) in Burma in 1856 for prominent London shipowner Duncan Dunbar. She was named after one of Dunbar's ancestors, Gospatric, Earl of Northumbria. Following Dunbar's death in 1862, the ship was sold to Smith, Fleming & Co. of London. Cospatrick spent most of her career trading between England and India carrying passengers, troops, and cargo. In 1863, Cospatrick was engaged with other ships to lay a telegraphic cable in the Persian Gulf. She had also made two voyages to Australia before being sold to Shaw, Savill & Co. of London in 1873. Cospatrick then became one of many ships owned by this company that carried cargo and emigrants from England to New Zealand.

== Destruction ==
Cospatrick sailed from Gravesend for Auckland on 11 September 1874 with 433 passengers and 44 crew under Captain Alexander Elmslie. The passengers included 429 assisted emigrants, of whom 125 were women and 126 were children. During the voyage, eight infants died and one child was born, as well as a stillbirth.

The voyage was otherwise uneventful until about 12:45 a.m. on 18 November, when a fire broke out on board. The ship was then several hundred nautical miles south-west of the Cape of Good Hope. The ship's second mate, Charles Henry MacDonald, later recounted that he had retired at midnight and was awoken half an hour later by a cry of "Fire!" He hurried onto the deck and found that a fire had broken out in the boatswain's store, where oakum, tar, paint and ropes were stored. The crew was summoned to man the fire hoses, while the captain and crew tried, but failed, to turn the ship before the wind, to take the smoke and flames forward and to contain the fire.

The fire rapidly grew out of control and panic ensued. Although there were five lifeboats on board capable of carrying 187 people, only two were successfully launched. One overloaded lifeboat capsized, and all its occupants were lost. Cospatrick sank about 40 hours after the fire was discovered. At the time, the two surviving lifeboats contained 62 people. One boat was subsequently lost from sight during heavy weather.

The surviving boat was picked up by the British Sceptre on 27 November, about ten days after the fire. By then, only five people remained alive. The survivors later reported that they had resorted to drinking the blood and eating the livers of deceased companions. Two of the survivors died shortly after being rescued, leaving only second mate Charles Henry MacDonald, able seaman Thomas Lewis, and passenger Edward Cotter alive.

== Aftermath ==
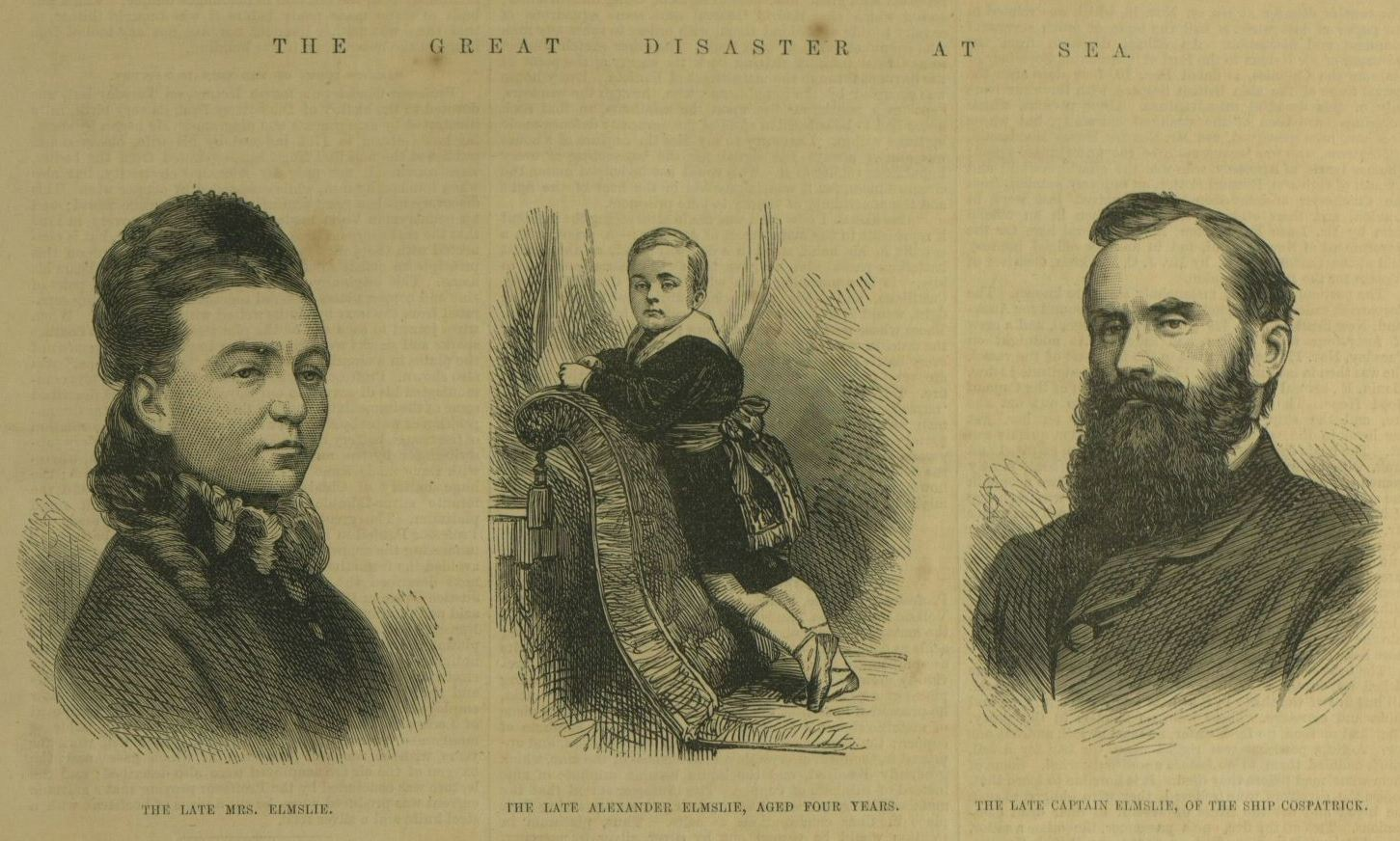
The Elmslie family

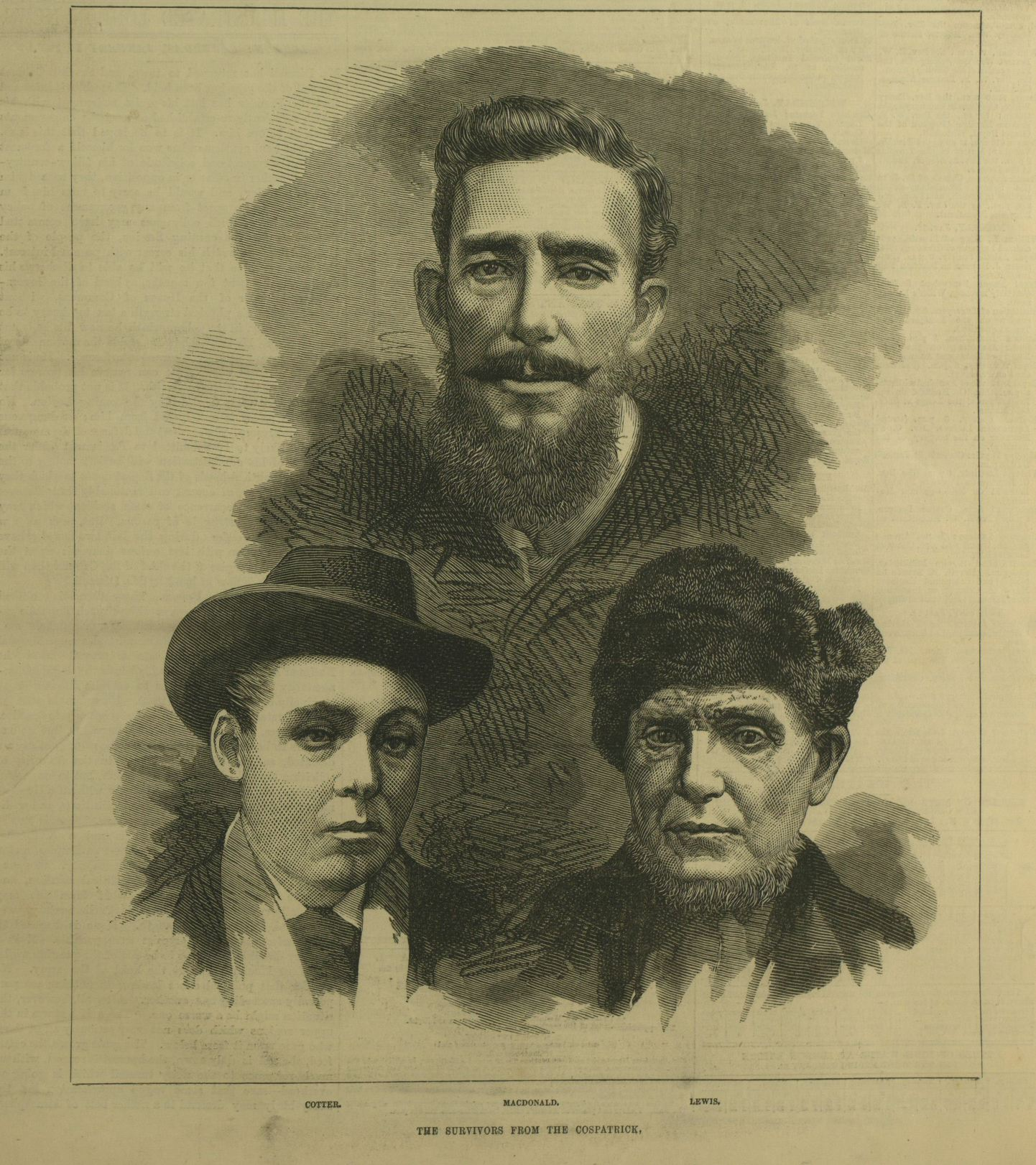
The survivors from the Cospatrick

An inquiry found it most likely that the fire had been caused when a member of the crew or a passenger attempted to pilfer cargo using a naked light, igniting straw or other combustible material. The fire then spread rapidly because of the flammable goods stored in the forehold, including coal, turpentine, palm oil, spirits and other oils. Another possibility considered was spontaneous combustion.

The disaster prompted public concern over the provision and handling of lifeboats on emigrant ships. The loss of the Cospatrick was subsequently remembered as one of the worst disasters associated with New Zealand-bound emigrant shipping.

== See also ==
- Cannibalism at sea
- List of disasters in New Zealand by death toll
- List of incidents of cannibalism
- HMS Orpheus
- R v Dudley and Stephens
