= Nerre Nerre Warren =

Heritage site in Melbourne, Australia

- Narre Narre Warren; Dandenong Police Paddocks Reserve
- Location of the reserve in Greater Metropolitan Melbourne
- Interactive map of Nerre Nerre Warren
- Type: Police paddock complex (former); Cemetery (former); Nature reserve
- Location: Churchill Park Drive, Endeavour Hills, City of Casey, Melbourne, Victoria, Australia
- Coordinates: 37°57′08″S 145°14′12″E
- Area: 499 ha (1,230 acres)
- Owner: Government of Victoria
- Manager: Parks Victoria
- Status: Open
- Protection acts: Aboriginal Heritage Act 2006; Heritage Act 2017
- Website: parks.vic.gov.au

History
- Built: 1837; 189 years ago

Site notes
- Material: Wattle and daub; stone; timber; concrete

Victorian Heritage Register
- Official name: Nerre Nerre Warren
- Type: Registered place
- Criteria: a., c.
- Designated: 14 April 2016
- Reference no.: H2348
- Heritage overlay no.: HO2
- Categories: Aboriginal; Law Enforcement

Register of the National Estate
- Official name: Narre Narre Warren Protectorate Station
- Type: Defunct register
- Designated: 14 May 1991
- Reference no.: 13865

Nerre Nerre Warren, also spelled as Narre Narre Warren, is a former colonial police paddock complex and significant Indigenous archaeological site, located on Churchill Park Drive in Endeavour Hills, in the City of Casey, in the outer eastern suburbs of Melbourne, in Victoria, Australia.

Established by colonial forces from 1837, initially as the Native Police Corps Headquarters, then the Westernport Aboriginal Protectorate Home Station, and then the Dandenong Police Paddocks and Horse Stud Depot, the 499-hectare (1,230-acre) site was subsequently transformed into the Dandenong Police Paddocks Reserve, a nature reserve of sloping land along a ridge overlooking the Dandenong Creek and river flats, which includes the surface and subsurface remains of former police facilities. The reserve is managed by Parks Victoria.

Located on the traditional lands of the Bunurong and Wurundjeri Woi-wurrung people of the Kulin Nation, the site was added to the Victorian Heritage Register on 14 April 2016 in recognition of its archaeological and historical significance; and was also added to the non-statutory and now defunct Register of the National Estate on 14 May 1991.

== History ==
=== Pre-Colonial period ===
The earliest history of this site relates to Aboriginal use. Although the Baluk-Willan clan of the Wurendjeri owned the land, it was on the border of the country owned by the Ngaruk-Willan clan of the Bunurong tribe. Both groups would certainly have used the resources of the creek and the flood plain for thousands of years.

=== Colonial period ===
Between 1837 and 1853 the site was jointly occupied by Aboriginal and non-Aboriginal groups. The first Native Police Corps in Victoria was established in 1837 by Captain William Lonsdale, the superintendent of Port Phillip District of the Colony of New South Wales, under the leadership of Captain Christian Ludolph Johannes de Villiers, with its headquarters located on the site. Its purpose was to apprehend runaway convicts and try to keep the peace between Aborigines and non-Aborigines. Membership of the Corps was disbanded three months later. Further attempts to set up a Native Corps were made in 1838 and 1839.

In 1840, a third Native Police Corps moved to the Dandenong Protectorate Station. This was the Central Station for the Westernport District of the Aboriginal Protectorate, under Assistant Protector William Thomas between 1841 and 1843. Aboriginal people were encouraged to adopt a settled agricultural life style. They worked hard constructing a village, sowing, ploughing and fencing, but they continued their seasonal movements to other areas and to Melbourne.

A forth Native Police Corps formed in 1842 contained a third division composed of old men and recruits who built a large and substantial headquarters on the site under the direction of Henry Edmund Dana, and until 1852, the site functioned as their headquarters.

=== Victoria Police management ===
In the post-1853 years, after the discovery of gold in Victoria, the Police Paddocks had a number of uses. It was the period of the massive reorganisation that resulted in the establishment of the Victoria Police as we know it today. From 1853 to 1931 the site was the central station for the Police Stud Depot: horses were bred, trained, broken, and spelled on the site.

From 1879 to 1931 the site was home to a succession of Queensland Aboriginal trackers, initially brought to Victoria to assist in the search for the notorious Ned Kelly and his gang in 1879.

In 1962 a stone house and barracks were pulled down due to safety concerns prior to the seventh national Scout jamboree held on the site in 1964–1965. In 1969 an area was set aside for a golf course (now under the ownership of the City of Berwick) and since 1973 tip sites in the area have been operated by the cities of Berwick and Dandenong. The site is currently known as the Dandenong Police Paddocks; and was used by the Victorian Mounted Police as their stud reserve.

== Description ==
Nerre Nerre Warren is located in Endeavour Hills approximately 30 kilometres (19 mi) south east of Melbourne. It consists of parklands which contain a number of archaeological site and deposits along a prominent ridge line. Brick and granite ruins can be seen at surface level, including one brick wall. The presence of surface fabric indicates that there is a high level of subsurface archaeological intactness.

Between 1841 and 1842 the Westernport Aboriginal Protectorate included five buildings of wattle and daub, roofed with bark or thatch. These buildings were occupied by the assistant protector, the overseer, the schoolmaster and the convict labourers. A four-by-four-hectare (nine-by-ten-acre) fenced paddock, used for cultivation, a stock paddock and a school were also constructed. It was hoped by the European administration that the Aborigines living on the Protectorate would gradually discover the value of a sedentary life based on agriculture. The records suggest the Aboriginal people preferred a combination of lifestyles with limited agricultural work tied into a more important traditional cycle of movement around their territory.

The place is the site of a number of burials. Eight Aboriginal troopers died on the station and were buried there, with military funerals appropriate to their rank. Three Aboriginal people associated with the police died and were buried there. The European Sergeant-major died there and may have been buried there. As well, a number of Aboriginal people who died during the period of the Protectorate may be buried there. The site of the Native Police Cemetery has not been found.

There are many features of historical, social, and archaeological significance in the Police Paddocks, dating from various periods in the history of the area, includinge building ruins, remains of an old bridge, Aboriginal stone artefacts, trees, and rubbish dumps.

== See also ==
- Australian native police
- Bunurong troopers for the Native Police
- Dandenong Valley Parklands
- List of places on the Victorian Heritage Register in the City of Casey
- Victoria Police Mounted Branch
- William Barak
- Wurundjeri troopers for the Native Police
