= Mounted police =

Police who patrol on horseback or camelback

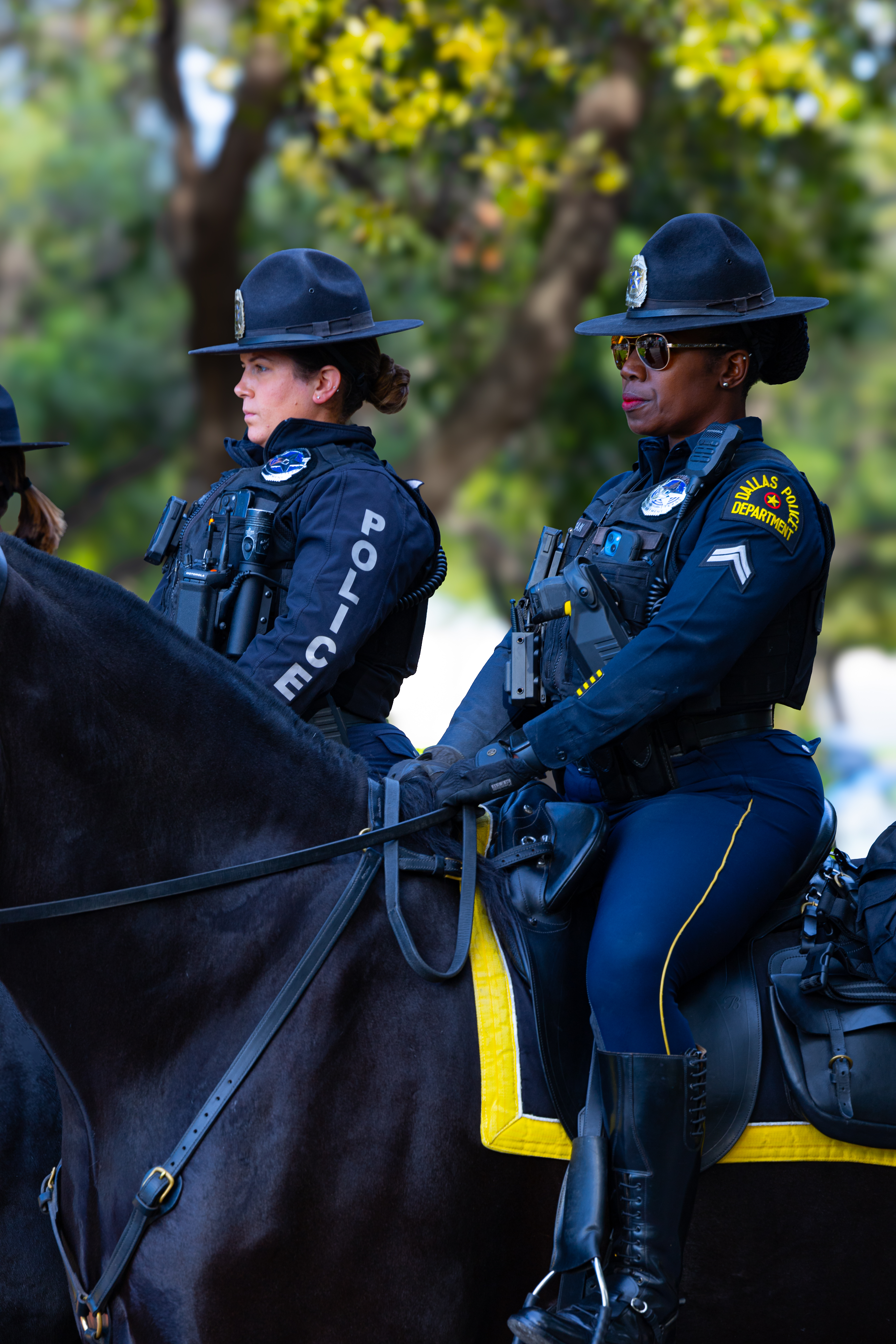
Dallas Police Department Mounted Unit

Mounted police are police who patrol on horseback or camelback. Their day-to-day function is typically picturesque or ceremonial, but they are also employed in crowd control because of their mobile mass and height advantage and increasingly in the UK for crime prevention and high visibility policing roles. The added height and visibility that the horses give their riders allows officers to observe a wider area, and it also allows people in the wider area to see the officers, which helps deter crime and helps people find officers when they need them. When employed for crowd control, there is a risk that some people may be trampled (resulting in injuries or death). The officer riding the horse may be held legally responsible for injuries depending upon the totality of the circumstances.

Mounted police may be employed for specialized duties ranging from patrol of parks and wilderness areas to riot. For example, in the UK, mounted police are most often seen at football matches. Some mounted police units are trained in search and rescue due to the horse's ability to travel where vehicles cannot.

== History ==
The French Maréchaussée—direct predecessors of the gendarmerie and the first national police force in a modern sense—were a corps of completely mounted constabulary from their establishment in the early 18th century. Poor roads and extensive rural areas made horse-mounted police a necessity in European states until the early 20th century.

The establishment of organized law-enforcement bodies throughout Africa, Asia and the Americas during the colonial and post-colonial eras made the concept of predominantly horse-police accepted almost world-wide. Notable examples include the Royal Canadian Mounted Police, the Mexican Rurales, the Rhodesian British South Africa Police, the Turkish/Cypriot Zapiteh and the caballeria (mounted branch) of the Spanish Civil Guard.

== Equipment ==
Tack used by mounted police is similar to standard riding tack, with adaptations for police use. Synthetic saddles are often favored over those made of natural leather to reduce weight, important both because of long riding hours and because police officers must carry numerous articles of personal equipment. High-traction horseshoes made of speciality metals or fitted with rubber soles are typically used in urban areas in place of standard steel horseshoes, which are prone to slip on pavement. Rubber soled shoes also produce less noise than steel shoes and jar the hoof less.

Horses working in riot control wear facial armor, made of perspex so that the animals can still see. The officers themselves are often equipped with especially long wooden or polycarbonate batons for use on horseback, as standard patrol batons would have insufficient length to strike individuals at ground level.

== Notable modern units ==
=== Australia ===
Australia, being a large country and not densely populated, commonly used mounted police in order to traverse the country side. All of the Mounted police units were formed in the 19th century and have continued to this day, excepting Tasmania.

- The New South Wales Mounted Police is a mounted section of the New South Wales Police Force, and the oldest continuous mounted group in the world, formed on 7 September 1825. Currently they have a strength of 36 officers and around 38 mounts and their duties include traffic and crowd management, patrols, and ceremonial protocol duties.
- The Victoria Police Mounted Branch was formed in 1838 as the Mounted Police Fifth Division which consisted of soldiers from infantry regiments. The Unit has 26 officers and more than 20 mounts.

=== Canada ===
Mounted police units were used in Canada during the 19th century to carry out peace officer duties across vast and sparsely inhabited areas. The predecessors to the Royal Canadian Mounted Police (RCMP), the Royal North-West Mounted Police, relied on using mounted riders from its inception in 1873 to carry out their policing duties across the Prairies. These mounted police were frequently the only government officials in the area.

=== United Kingdom ===
The Bow Street Horse Patrol, founded in 1763, are the oldest uniformed police force in the world. They were formally incorporated into the Metropolitan Police in 1836. Today the Metropolitan Police Mounted Branch is the mounted section of the Metropolitan Police, the police force of Greater London (excluding the City of London, where the separate City of London Police has its own mounted branch). The Metropolitan Police Mounted Branch undertakes crowd control duties, especially at football matches, but also conducts general street patrols and escorts the Royal Guard change at the London's royal residences.

=== United States ===
Many cities in the United States have mounted units, New York having one of the largest with 55 horses as of 2016,

The United States Border Patrol had 200 horses in 2005. Most of these are employed along the U.S.–Mexico border. In Arizona, these animals are fed special processed feed pellets so that their wastes do not spread non-native plants in the national parks and wildlife areas they patrol.

== Gallery ==
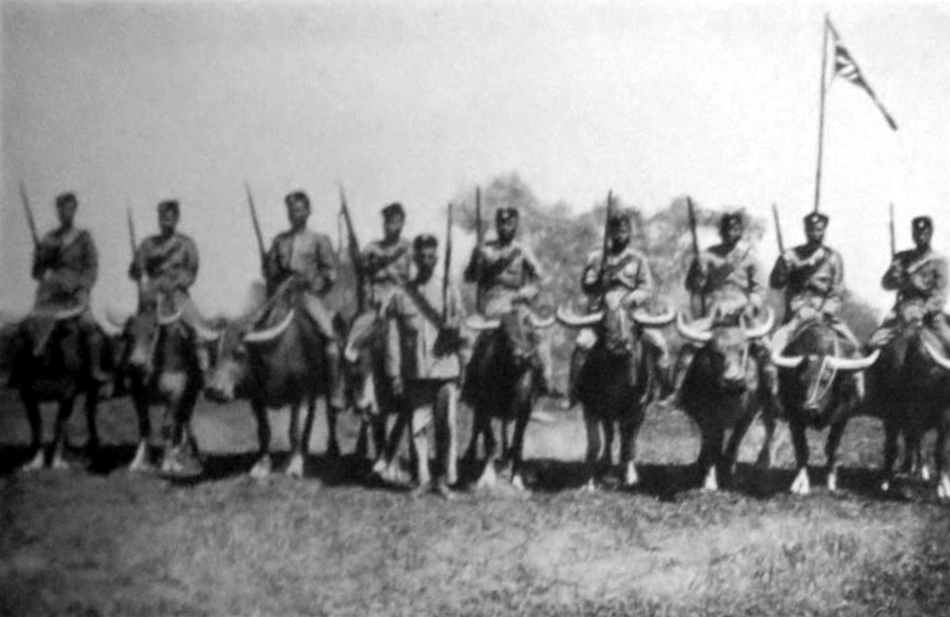
The "Flying Squad" of the British North Borneo Constabulary pictured here around 1923, mounted on water buffaloes.

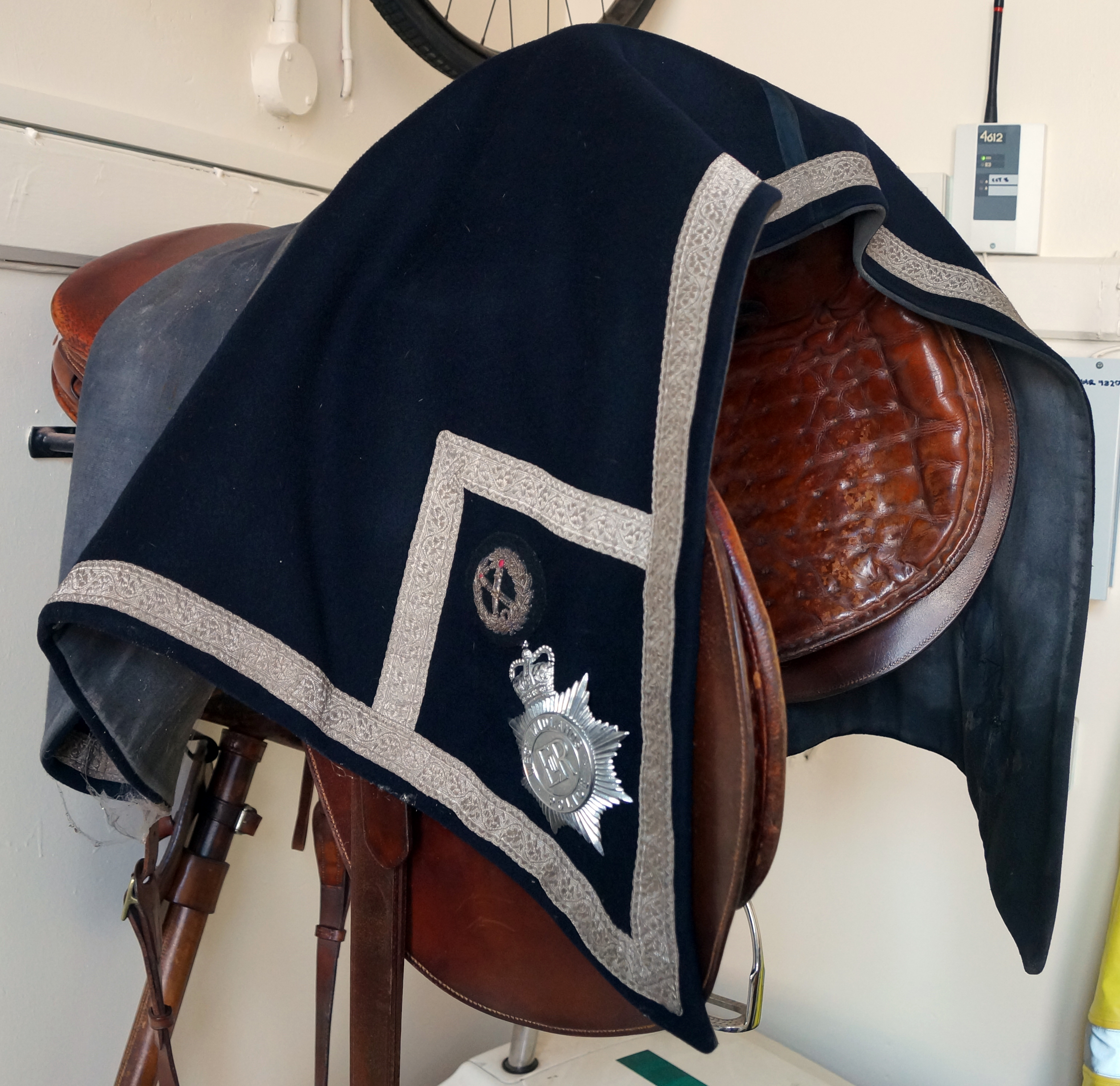
Horse saddle used by the West Midlands Police's mounted unit.

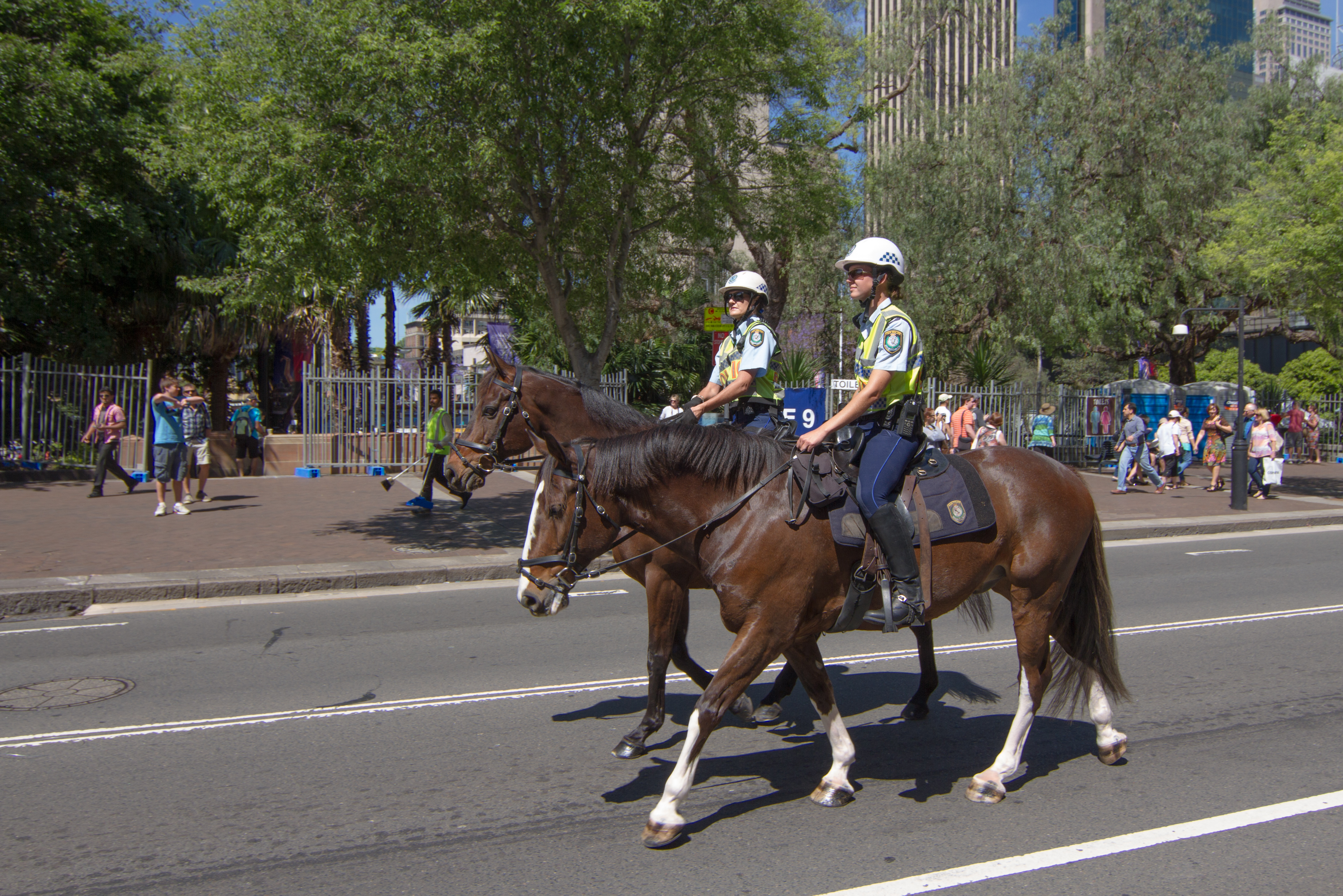
Members of the New South Wales Mounted Police on patrol in Sydney.

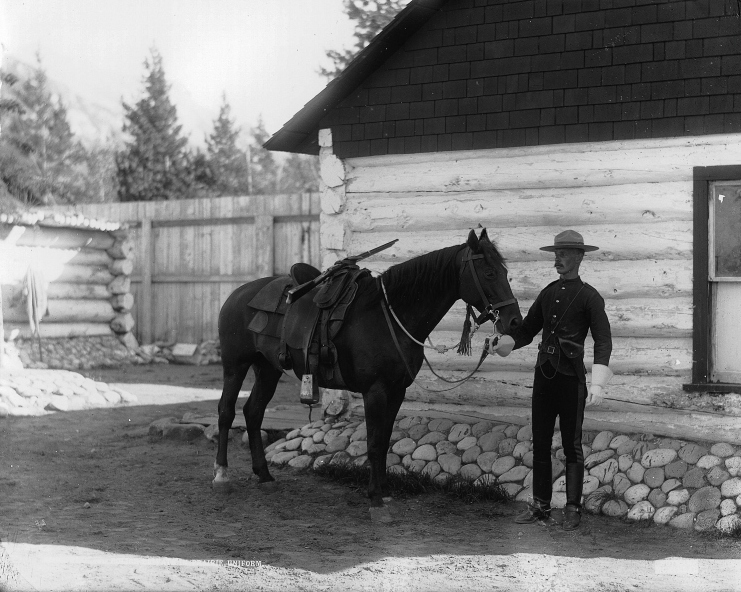
A North-West Mounted Police constable next to his horse in Alberta, Canada, 1897

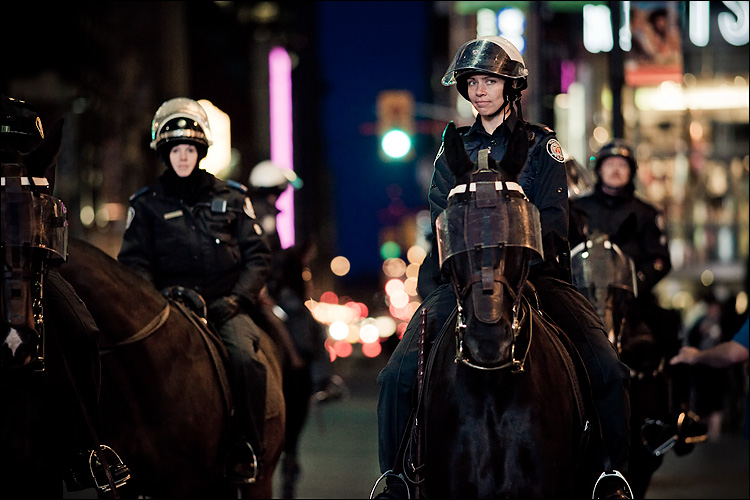
Toronto Police Service mounted officers

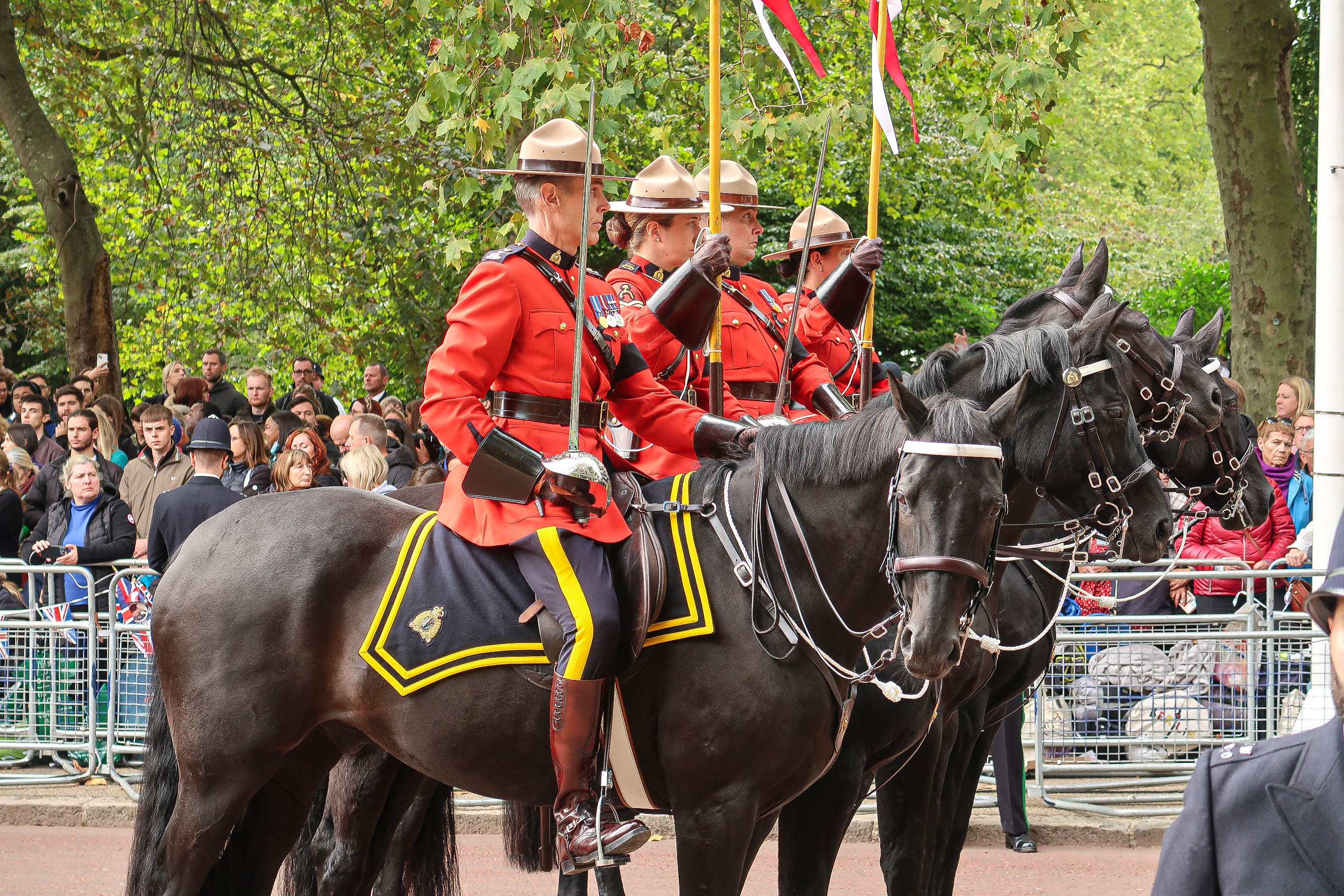
RCMP mounted officers at the state funeral of Elizabeth II

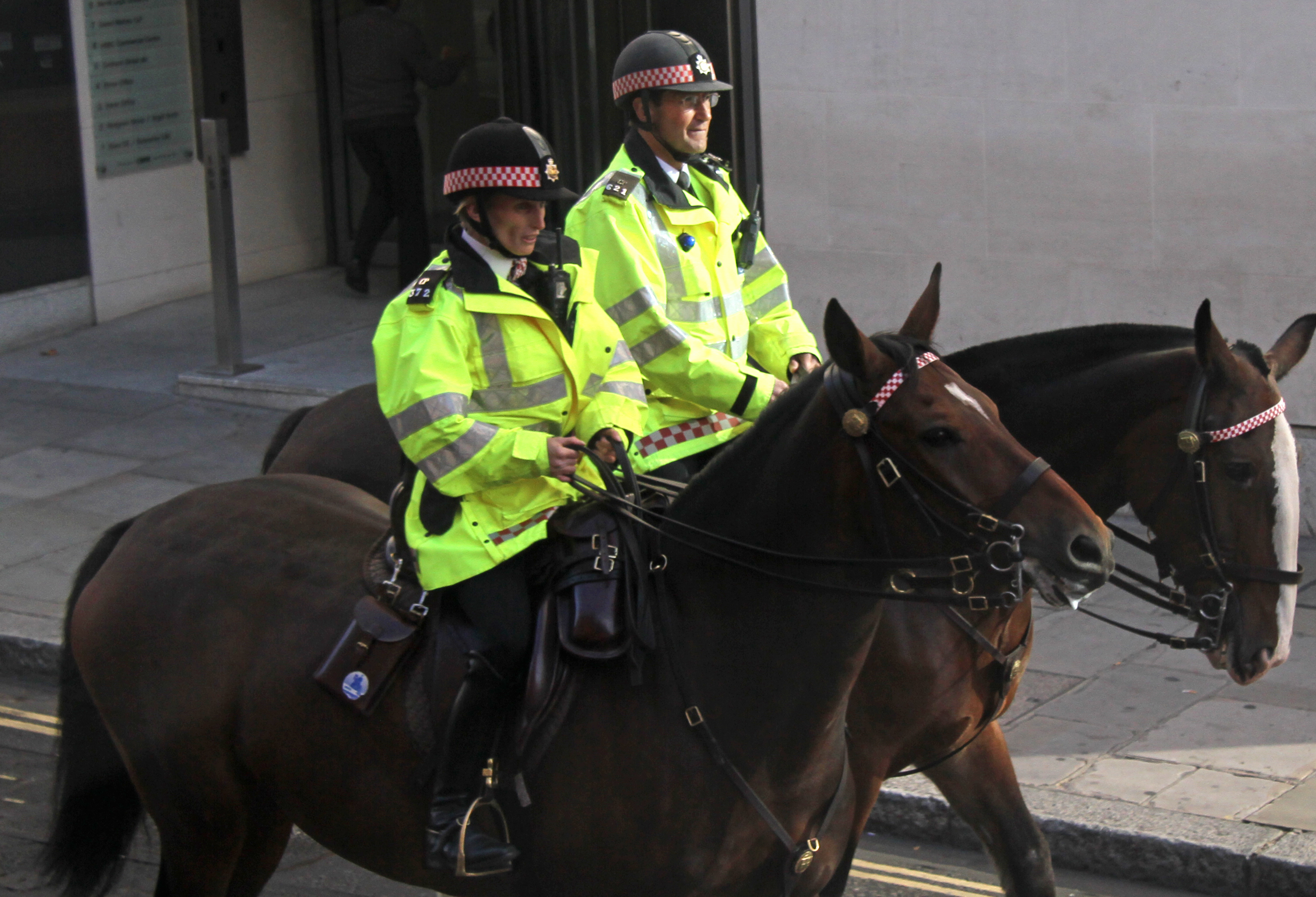
Members of the City of London Police Mounted Unit.

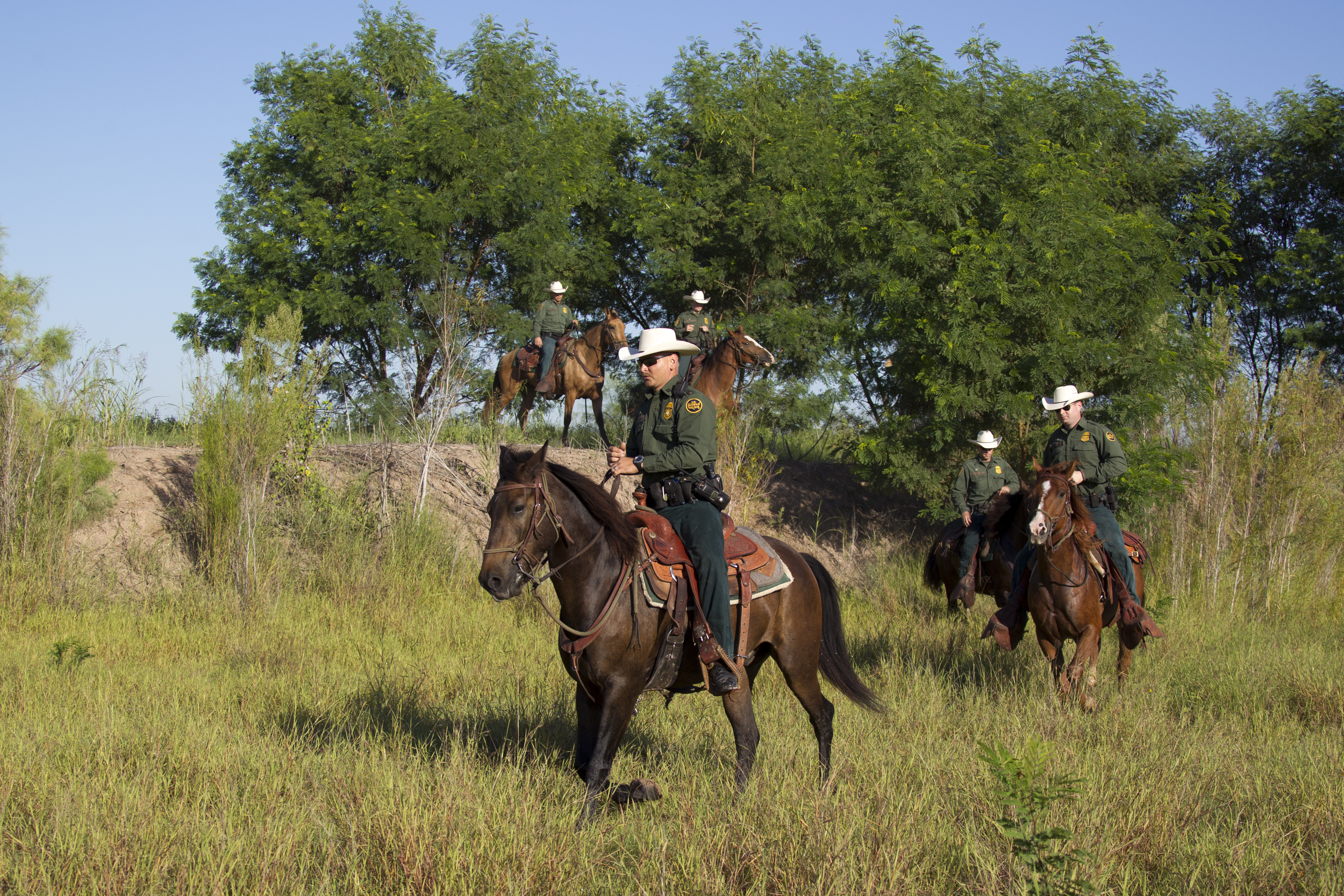
United States Border Patrol agents patrol on horseback in Texas.

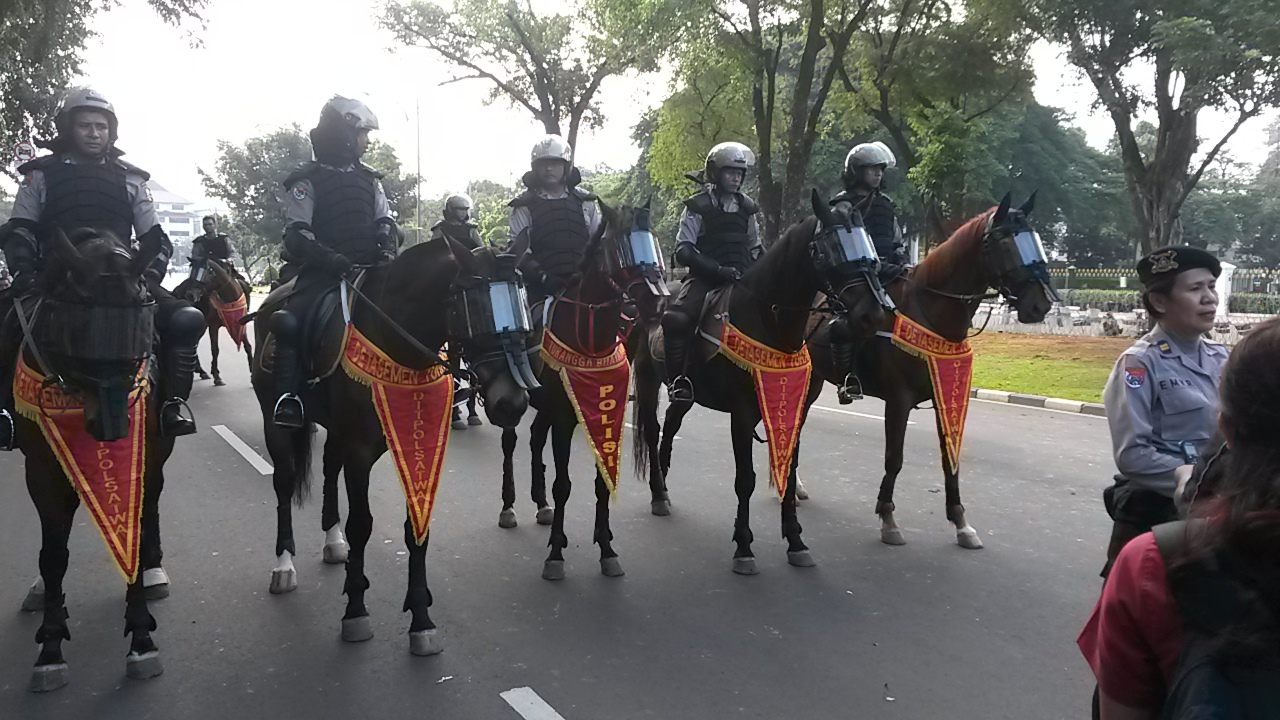
Indonesian National Police Mountain Unit

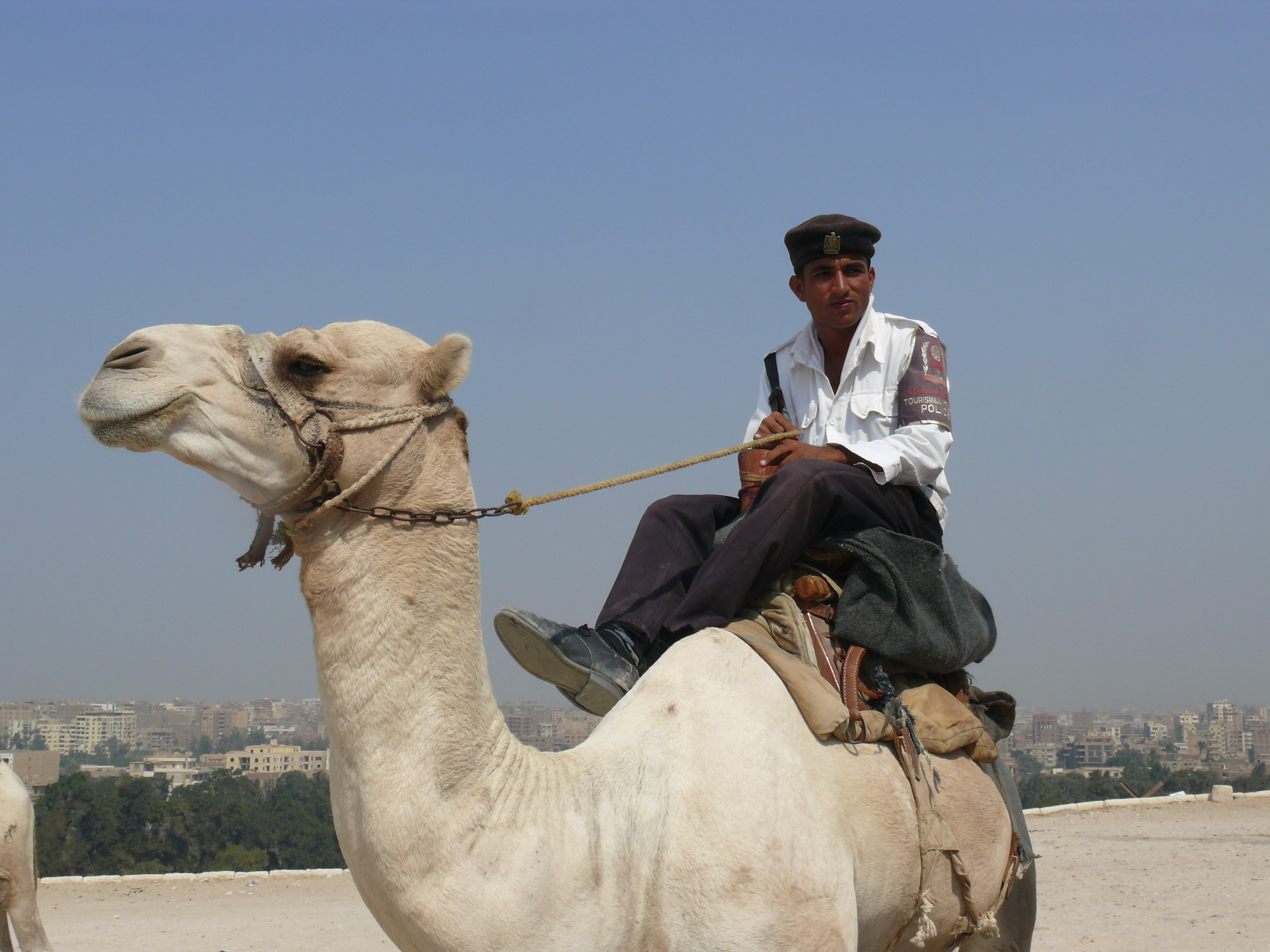
A mounted officer of the Egyptian National Police in Giza

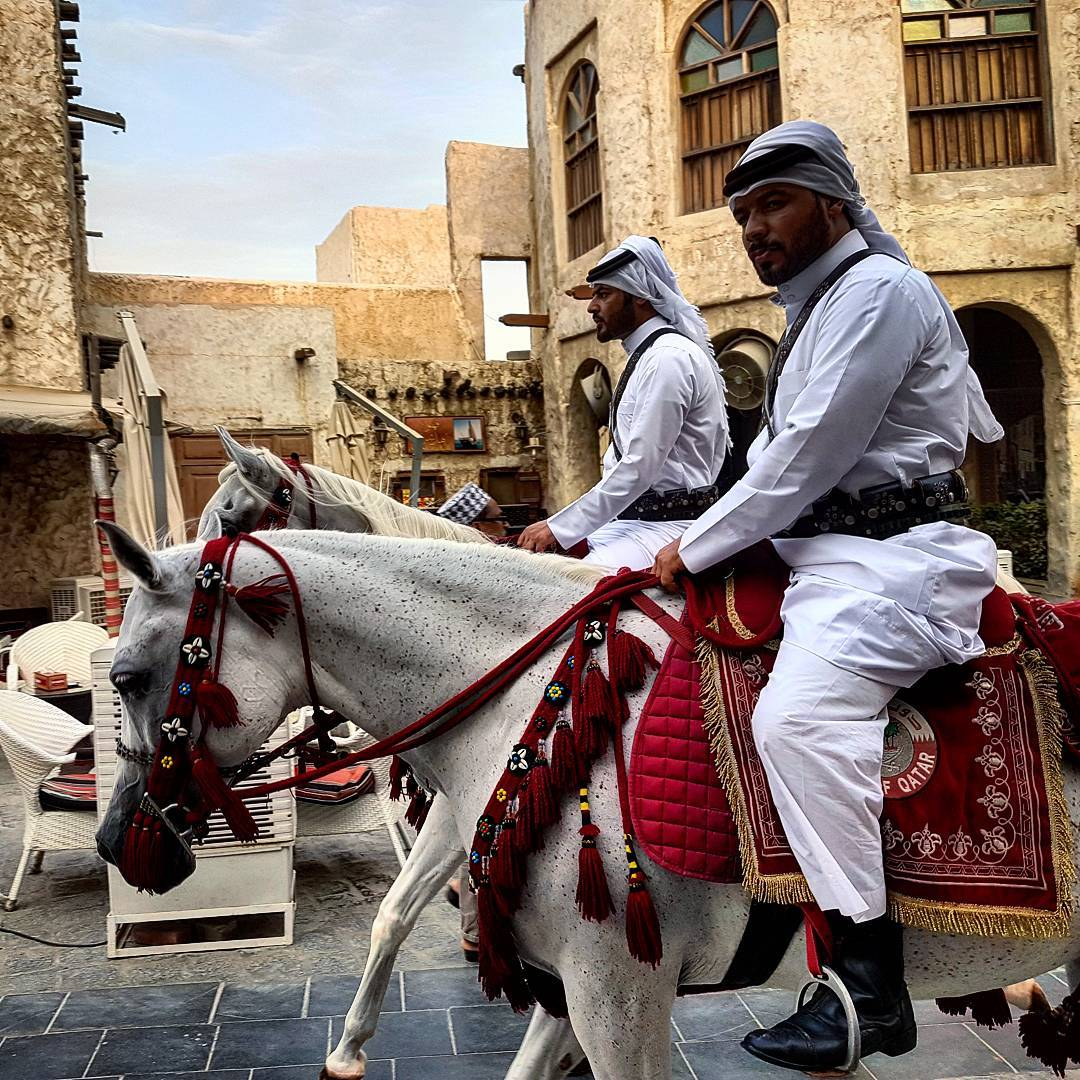
Mounted police of Qatari Ministry of Interior

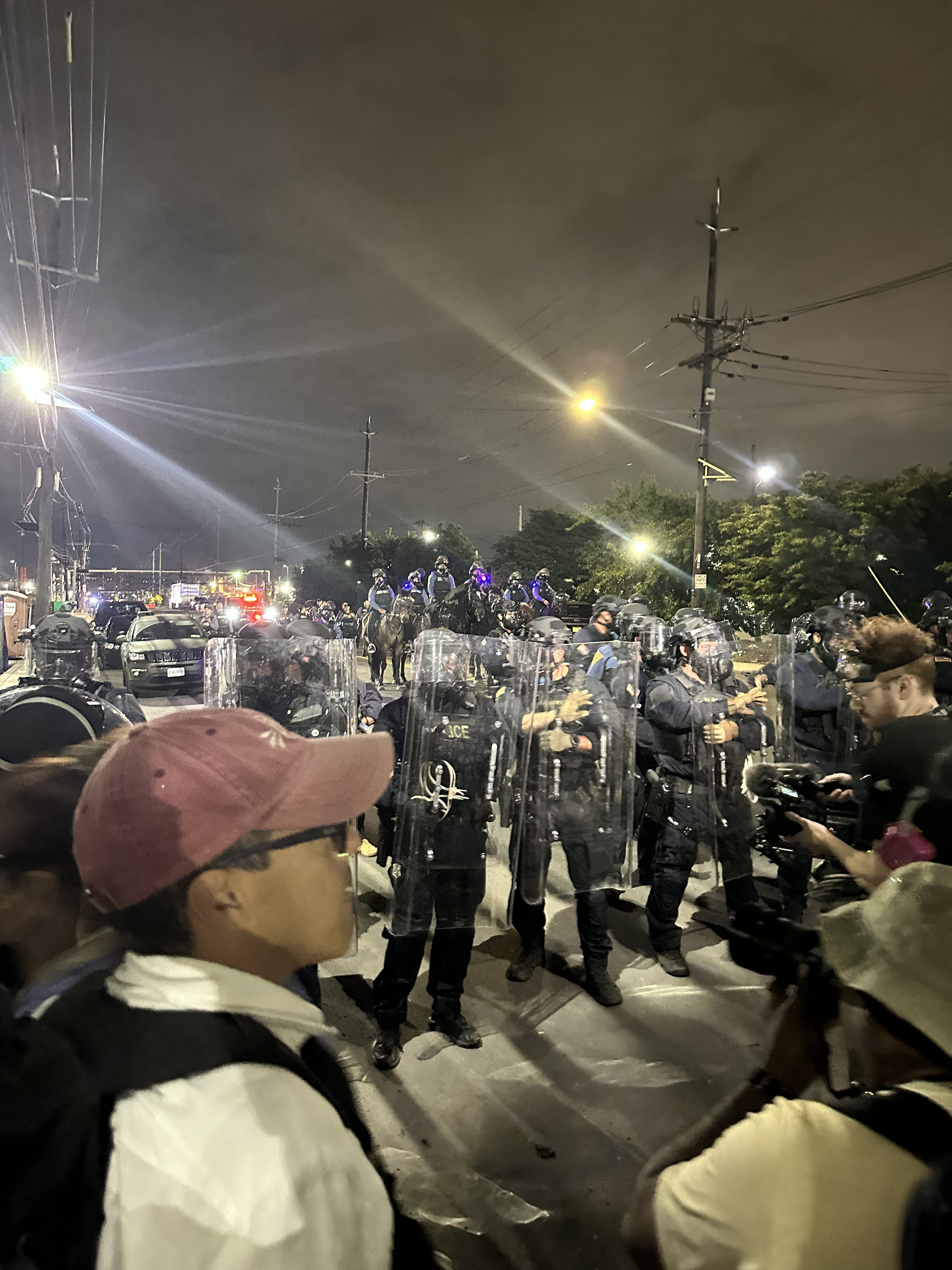
Mounted police behind New Jersey riot police at Delaney Hall protests

== See also ==
- Mounted search and rescue – Specialty within search and rescue
- Police dog – Dog trained and used for law enforcement
- Police paddock – Australian term for land set aside for police horses
- Use of UAVs in law enforcement – Alternative for crowd control
- Municipal horse
