= Madagascar (1837 ship) =

British merchant ship built for the trade to India and China in 1837

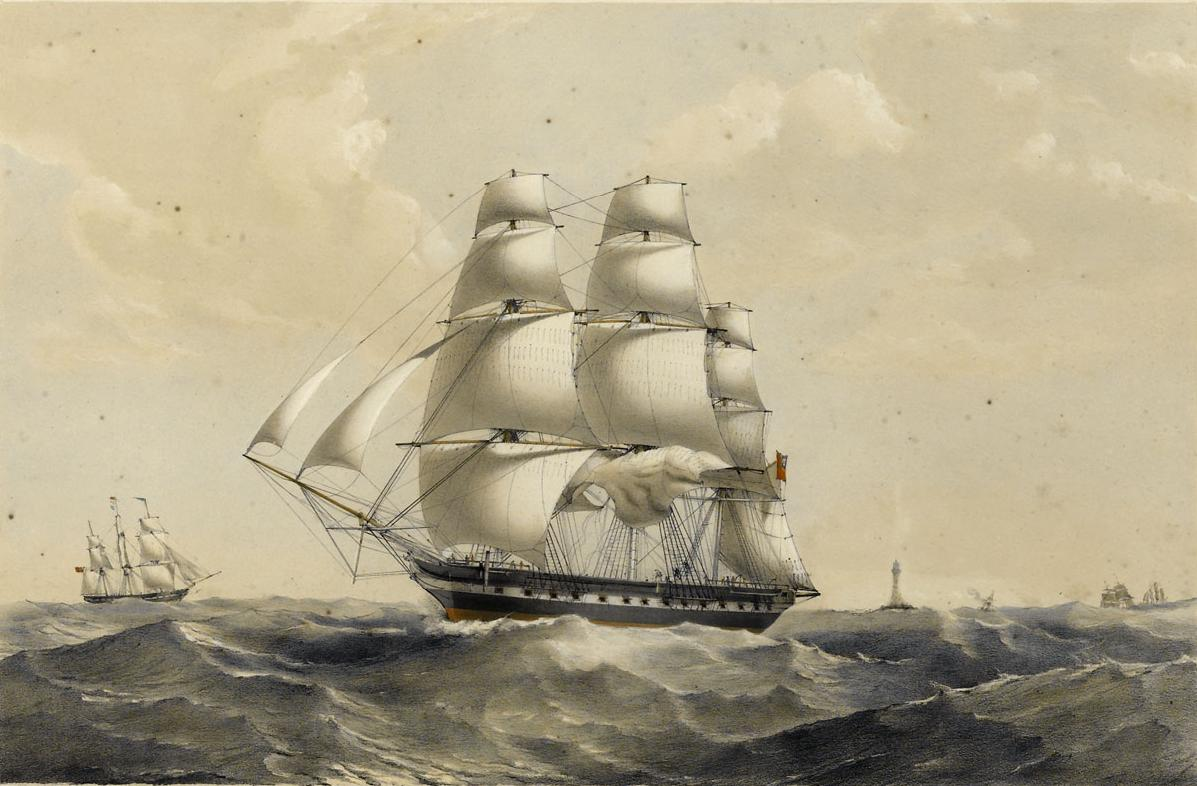
- The Blackwall Frigate Madagascar (lithograph, c. 1853)

History

United Kingdom
- Builder: Wigram and Green, Blackwall Yard, London
- Launched: 1837
- Homeport: London
- Fate: Lost, 1853

General characteristics
- Type: Blackwall Frigate
- Tonnage: 951 "New Measurement"
- Length: 150 ft 7 in (45.90 m)
- Beam: 32 ft 7 in (9.93 m)
- Draught: 15 ft (4.6 m) fully laden
- Depth of hold: 22 ft 5 in (6.83 m)
- Propulsion: Sail
- Sail plan: Three-masted full-rigged ship
- Crew: 60

Madagascar was a large British merchant ship built for the trade to India and China in 1837 that disappeared on a voyage from Melbourne to London in 1853. The disappearance of Madagascar was one of the great maritime mysteries of the 19th century and has probably been the subject of more speculation than any other 19th century maritime puzzle, except for the Mary Celeste.

== Career ==
Madagascar, the second Blackwall Frigate, was built for George and Henry Green at the Blackwall Yard, London, shipyard they co-owned with the Wigram family.

A one-eighth share in the vessel was held throughout her 16-year career by her first master Captain William Harrison Walker; various members of the Green family continued to own the remainder. Madagascar carried freight, passengers, and troops between England and India until the end of 1852. In addition to her normal crew she also carried many boys being trained as officers for the merchant marine. Known as midshipmen from naval practice, their parents or guardians paid for their training, and they only received a nominal wage of usually a shilling a month.

== Final voyage ==
Due to the Victorian Gold Rush, Madagascar, under the command of Captain Fortescue William Harris, was sent to Melbourne with emigrants, including a number of assisted poor female emigrants. She left Plymouth on 11 March 1853 and, after an uneventful passage of 87 days, reached Melbourne on 10 June. Fourteen of her 60 crew jumped ship for the diggings, and it is believed only about three replacements were signed on. She then loaded a cargo that included wool, rice, and about two tonnes of gold valued at £240,000, and took on board about 110 passengers for London.

On Wednesday 10 August, just as she was preparing to sail, police went on board and arrested a bushranger John Francis, who was later found to have been one of those responsible for robbing on 20 July the Melbourne Private Escort between the McIvor goldfield (Heathcote, Victoria) and Kyneton. On the following day the police arrested two others, one on board the ship and the other as he was preparing to board. As a result of these arrests Madagascar did not leave Melbourne until Friday 12 August 1853. After she left Port Phillip Heads the Madagascar was never seen again.

When the ship became overdue many theories were floated, including spontaneous combustion of the wool cargo, hitting an iceberg and, most controversially, being seized by criminal elements of the passengers and/or crew and scuttled, with the gold being stolen and the remaining passengers and crew murdered.

== Legacy ==
In 1872 rumours of a supposed death-bed confession by a man who "knew who murdered the captain of the Madagascar" were first published. Over the next century many purely fictional stories based on this rumour have been published (being mentioned by authors of such reputation as Basil Lubbock and James A. Michener). Most 20th-century versions state that the death-bed confession was by a woman passenger who was taken by the mutineers, and by implication raped, and was too ashamed of what had happened to her to confess beforehand.

The legend of Madagascar and her fate has also been used many times as a plot device in popular fiction, the earliest known being in Frank Fowler's Adrift; or The Rock in the South Atlantic (which is probably the foundation of the modern mutiny legends), and later in Thomas Harrison's My Story; or, the Fate of the "Madagascar", first published as a serial in The Colonial Magazine, Melbourne, in 1868. It probably influenced many other gold-rush era sea stories including Clark Russell's The Tale of Ten: A Salt Water Romance in 1896, and the alleged loss of the Starry Crown—reported as fact in T. C. Bridges' The Romance of Buried Treasure in 1931—which was in turn used in 1949 by Captain W. E. Johns in Biggles Breaks the Silence. The most recent use of the mystery in a fictional setting is probably Sandy Curtis's Deadly Tide (Pan Macmillan Australia Pty Ltd., 2003, ISBN 0-33036398-0).
