= Nelson robbery =

1852 gold robbery in Australia

The Nelson robbery was one of the major crimes of the Victorian gold rush. It involved the robbery at gunpoint of 8,183 ounces (232,000 g) of gold valued at about £30,000 by a party of thieves from the barque Nelson as she lay at anchor in Hobsons Bay off Melbourne on the night of 1–2 April 1852.

== Nelson ==
Nelson was a barque of 603 29/100th tons New Measurement, 128.2 by 26.9 by 19.4 feet (39.1 m × 8.2 m × 5.9 m), built at Dumbarton, Scotland by Denny & Rankine in 1844. Her original owners were Lewis, Alexander, John and James Potter, Peter Denny and Daniel Rankine. She spent many years in the trade between London and Melbourne. Years after the robbery, Nelson hit rocks and sank near the Seven Stones at the entrance to the English Channel on 7 October 1870 while on a voyage from Aguilas to the Tyne, drowning the master, Captain Henderson and two of her crew. The ship's figurehead was recovered and on 25 February 2004 was sold at auction at Knightsbridge for £3760.

== The robbery ==
On 18 October 1851, the Nelson arrived at Melbourne under the command of Captain Walter Wright. Having left London within days of the discovery of gold in Victoria, her master was unaware of the situation in port and over the days after arrival most of the crew jumped ship. The Nelson was, nevertheless, towed to Geelong, loaded a cargo of wool and gold consigned by local merchants, and returned to Melbourne to find more crew.

Captain Wright was staying in town, leaving the Nelson in charge of the First and Second Mates and three other crew, when a party of robbers estimated to number between ten and over twenty boarded the ship from two stolen boats, bailed up all on board, and forced their way into the lazarette containing the gold. One shot was fired during the outrage, slightly injuring the First Mate Henry Draper. The robbers then reboarded their boats and slipped off into the darkness. It was later discovered that they had landed on St Kilda beach and divided the gold amongst themselves before dispersing.

== The trials ==
Over several weeks several men, mostly former convicts from Van Diemens Land, were arrested and charged with the robbery, of which nine were eventually tried. A series of trials, mostly before Chief Justice Sir William à Beckett in Melbourne and Justice Redmond Barry in Geelong, ultimately sentenced five of them to lengthy sentences to hard labour in chains on the roads of Victoria: John James, James Duncan, James Morgan, Stephen Fox and John Roberts (who was later released after proving an alibi but soon convicted of another crime).

Several who were acquitted of the crime were later convicted of other crimes including the St Kilda Road robberies. Police recovered some £2263 in gold, cash, banknotes and other property from those arrested, most of which was eventually redistributed amongst the original owners. It was believed that much of the balance that the police had not recovered was fenced with a St. Kilda publican John Milton Dascombe (1824–1868), who was never charged with being involved in the affair.
