= Parramatta Park =

Parramatta Park may refer to:

- Parramatta Park, New South Wales, in Sydney, Australia
- Parramatta Park, Queensland, a suburb in Cairns, Australia
