= Parramatta (1866) =

Former sail ship

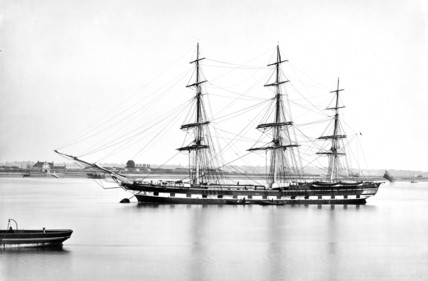
- Parramatta

History

United Kingdom
- Name: Parramatta
- Owner: Devitt and Moore
- Builder: James Laing, Sunderland England
- Launched: May 1866
- In service: 1866
- Fate: Lost at sea 1898

General characteristics
- Type: Blackwall frigate
- Tons burthen: 1521 (bm)
- Length: 231 ft 0 in (70.4 m)
- Beam: 38 ft 2 in (11.6 m)
- Depth: 22 ft 8 in (6.9 m)
- Sail plan: Full-rigged ship
- Notes: Teak-built

Parramatta was a sailing ship launched at Sunderland in 1866 that operated between Great Britain and Australia and America from 1866 to 1898. She was the second fastest Blackwall frigate. She originally carried wool from Australia to the United Kingdom. She foundered in 1898.

== History ==
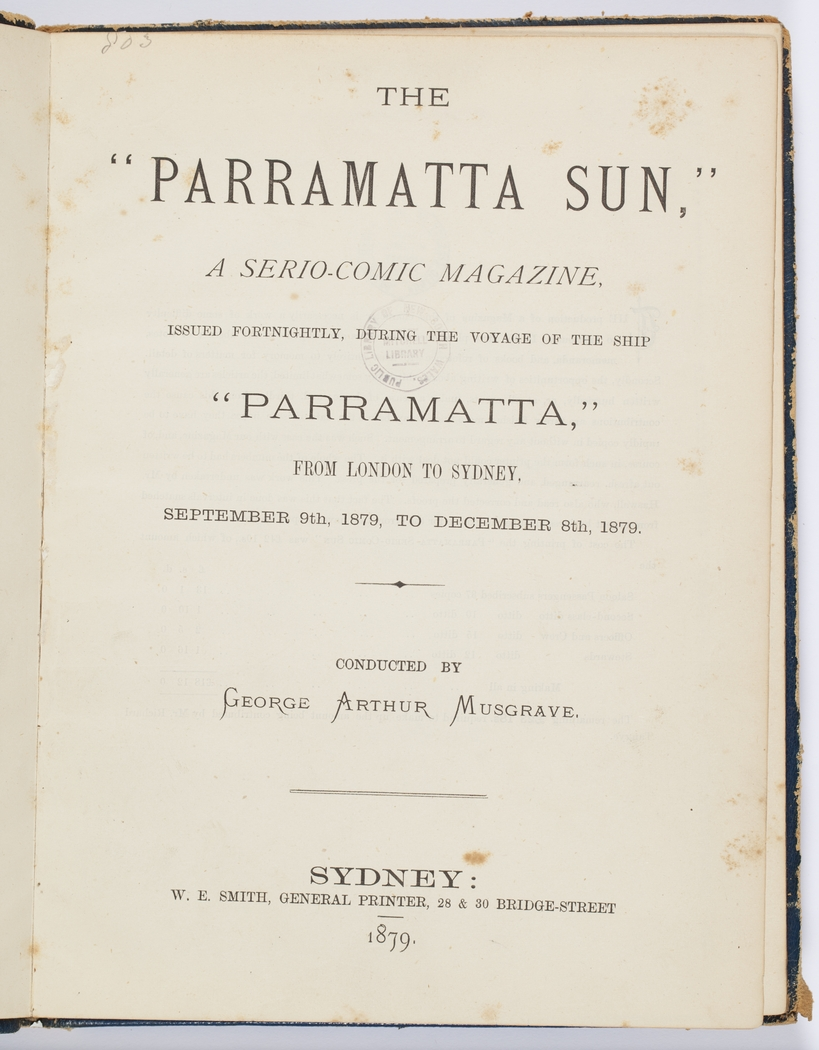
Parramatta Sun : a serio-comic magazine, issued fortnightly, during the voyage of the ship Parramatta.

Parramatta was launched in May 1866 for Devitt and Moore, in the United Kingdom. The ship was named after the Parramatta River near Sydney in Australia. The style of ship was known as a Blackwall frigate. These three-masted ships had been designed to supersede the British East Indiaman that carried goods from India to the United Kingdom. The clipper ships were actually used for carrying wool from Australia to the United Kingdom and passengers in both directions. Parramatta was the second fastest of this type after Tweed.

Apart from a brief spell in 1873–4, Parramatta was under the command of Captain John Williams until she was sold to Norwegian owners. In 1887 the ship was sold to J. Simonsen, Mandal, Norway.

When Parramatta undertook its three-month journeys from London to Sydney it would issue a fortnightly amusing magazine to the passengers on board. Some of these were subsequently issued in book form after the journey. The magazine's name changed each time. The Parramatta Sun was issued on the outward journey to Sydney from London from 9 September 1879 to 8 December 1879 and a copy is available on-line.

In 1890 Parramatta left England for Moscow. The ship travelled via Alexandria, Jerusalem, Cyprus, and Constantinople. Explorer and nurse Kate Marsden was on board visiting leper hospitals en route to her trip to Siberia.

== Fate ==
On 12 January 1898 Parramatta sailed from Galveston, Texas, laden with pitch-pine, bound for King's Lynn in Norfolk. She was never heard of again.
