= Paramatta (1803 ship) =

History

France
- Launched: 1798
- Captured: 1803

United Kingdom
- Name: Paramatta
- Namesake: Parramatta
- Owner: 1803:Hulet & Co., or Hallette & Co.; 1807:John Macarthur & Garnham Blaxcell
- Acquired: 1803 by purchase of a prize
- Fate: Wrecked late April/early May 1808

General characteristics
- Tons burthen: 102 (bm)
- Complement: 10
- Armament: 4 × 4-pounder guns + 2 × 12-pounder carronades

Paramatta (or Paramata, or Parramatta), was a schooner launched in 1798, probably under another name, in France. The British captured her in 1803. New owners sailed her to Australia. There, she became the flash point that led to the Rum Rebellion and the military coup that overthrew Governor William Bligh. She was lost in 1808.

== Career ==
Paramatta entered Lloyd's Register in 1804, with Campbell, master, Hulet & Co., owners, and trade London–(New) South Wales. The entry showed her launch year as 1798. Subsequent issues of the Register of Shipping and Lloyd's Register make clear that she had been captured in 1803.

Captain John Campbell acquired a letter of marque on 26 December 1804. Lloyd's Register for 1806 showed her master changing from Campbell to J. Gen.

Parramatta, Glenn, master, arrived at Port Jackson on 3 April 1807, with merchandise from England. John Macarthur and Garnham Blaxcell became the owners of Paramatta. In July, she sailed for Tahiti with a stowaway aboard, an escaped convict named James Horne. In Tahiti, rather than detaining Horne, Glenn arranged for him to go aboard an English vessel, General Wellesley. When Paramatta returned to Port Jackson Governor William Bligh demanded that the £900 bond that Paramatta (£800), Macarthur (£50), and Blaxcell (£50) be forfeited. (All vessels and their owners had to post bond when leaving Port Jackson that they would not take any people out of the Colony without the Governor's permission.) Macarthur refused to comply and the ship was seized. In December 1807, Bligh had an order issued for Macarthur to appear before the courts, which Macarthur refused to obey. He was arrested and bailed for a trial on 25 January 1808. This trial led to the so-called Rum Rebellion, when the officers of the New South Wales Corps, who constituted the court, sided with Macarthur and his allies: as a consequence, the Corps overthrew Bligh in a military coup on 26 January.

Parramatta sailed from Port Jackson for the last time on 14 April 1808, bound for the Fejees.

== Loss ==
In late April or early May, Parramatta was wrecked at Cape Brett, New Zealand, after making a hasty departure from the Bay of Islands. The crew survived the wreck but were captured and killed after a violent exchange with local Māori.

Parramatta had called at the Bay of Islands in distress. When local Māori asked for payment for the food they had provided to her the crew threw them overboard and fired upon them. As she sailed from the Bay Parramatta wrecked on rocks near Cape Brett. Māori killed all the crew and plundered the schooner.

Lloyd's List reported on 1 May 1810, that the schooner Paramatta had sailed from Sydney on 20 April 1808, and had not been heard of since.
