= John Francis (bushranger) =

Australian bushranger

John Francis (c. 1825 – after 1853) was one of a party of bushrangers who held up the Melbourne Private Escort Company's regular escort of gold from the McIvor diggings at Heathcote, Victoria, to Kyneton on the morning of 20 July 1853. At least six men were involved, five of whom including Francis and his brother, George Francis (c. 1825–1853), were apprehended. His brother committed suicide while in custody, but by turning Queen's evidence, Francis escaped punishment and the other three companions were hanged.

== Early life ==
John Francis was arrested for pick-pocketing in Sheffield, England, on 30 December 1843, convicted and sentenced to ten years' transportation and sent to Hobart Van Diemen's Land (Tasmania) on board the ship Maria Somes, arriving on 30 July 1844. His brother, George Francis, had arrived in Tasmania just three months earlier, having been convicted of stealing bees-wax at Sheffield early in 1843 and sentenced to seven years' transportation, and arriving on the Barossa on 3 May. Both men were convicted under the alias Fearn.

In 1847, Francis was arrested as one of a number of men suspected of robbing the premises of Hobart merchant Charles McLachlan, but was released after turning Queens evidence. Both men travelled to Melbourne during the early part of the Victorian Gold Rush, and married immigrant women in Melbourne during 1852. They counted as friends other former convicts Joseph Grey, George Melville (c. 1822–1853) and George Wilson (c. 1823–1853).

== Private escort robbery ==
In addition to the official government gold escort, a private gold escort operated between many of the Victorian gold fields and Melbourne, being noted for its speed and lower bureaucracy, at the expense of security. Taking advantage of the disorganisation of the Victorian Police Force at the time, on 20 July 1853 a party of bushrangers led by John Grey attacked the escort near Mia Mia as it proceeded from the McIvor goldfield to Kyneton, where it was to meet up with the regular Bendigo escort and continue on to Melbourne. Four of the six guards were shot and injured (two seriously) and the remaining pair fled back to McIvor to seek assistance. Extensive searches found no trace of the criminals, who escaped with gold and cash valued at about £10,000.

Of the known bushrangers, the Francis brothers, their wives, and Wilson booked passages to England by the Madagascar, Melville and his wife for Mauritius on the barque Collooney, and William Atkyns and his wife for Sydney by the steamer Hellespont.

On 10 August Melbourne police arrested Francis on board the ship Madagascar, and Wilson on the following day. They arrested George Francis as he was about to go on board the Madagascar on the same day, and he offered to give evidence against all the bushrangers in return for freedom for himself and his brother. After being returned to McIvor to identify four other accused bushrangers, Francis' brother committed suicide by cutting his throat with a razor on the way back to Melbourne on 23 August. Meanwhile, Melville, Wilson and Atkyns had also been arrested in Melbourne, but Grey escaped and was never seen again.

Francis turned Queen's evidence, and the police secured convictions for armed robbery and attempted murder on the other three bushrangers. They were hanged at Old Melbourne Gaol on 3 October 1853. Francis and his wife were given a free passage out of the colony and are believed to have gone to the Cape of Good Hope.

At the trial, the escort troops asserted that several more men were involved in the robbery than the six who were identified. According to popular legend they escaped on the Madagascar , which went missing on her voyage for London, and were involved in a mutiny to steal the gold and murder the remainder of the ship's passengers and crew. It appears more likely that the additional men were those arrested on George Francis's evidence but were released after his suicide, and that the ship was lost by natural hazards of the sea.

The escort robbery became one of the most famous crimes during the Victorian gold rush and is mentioned in many historical and fictional accounts of the period. The techniques used by the robbers were used in practice by many later bushrangers including Ben Hall and Frank Gardiner.
