= Blackwall frigate =

Type of three-masted full-rigged ship

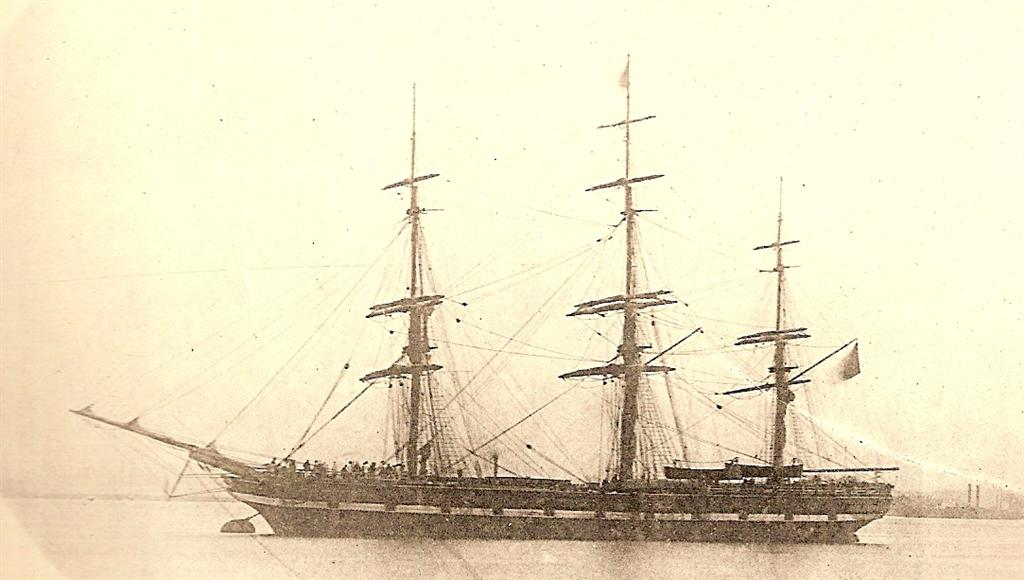
The Blackwall frigate Northfleet (1853)

Blackwall frigate was the colloquial name for a type of three-masted full-rigged ship built between the late 1830s and the mid-1870s.

They were originally intended as replacements for the British East Indiaman in the trade between England, the Cape of Good Hope, India and China. From the 1850s, the frigates were also employed in the trade between England, Australia and New Zealand.

The first Blackwall frigates were designed and built by Wigram and Green at Blackwall Yard on the River Thames. Under different owners these yards had built East Indiamen since the early 17th century as well as warships for the Royal Navy.

Whereas the traditional East Indiaman had double stern galleries, the Blackwall frigate had a single gallery and was so named partly because it was superficially similar in appearance to a frigate of the Royal Navy. With only a single gallery, the hull-lines at the stern could be very fine and combined with relatively fine underwater lines at the bow, Blackwall frigates were fast sailing ships, although not as fast as the clipper ships that appeared in the late 1840s. Another feature of early Blackwall frigates was a highly rounded hull at the bow above the waterline, such ships being referred to as "apple-cheeked". The first two Blackwall frigates, the 871-ton Seringapatam and 951-ton Madagascar launched in 1837, carried the names of two slightly larger Indian-built frigates in the Royal Navy, as did a number of their successors. This also appears to have been part of the inspiration for the popular terminology. The yard built warships as well as merchantmen and so some techniques and features from warship-design inevitably crept into the design of the Indiamen, leading to the similarity in appearance, a feature which probably inspired both the formal name choices, and the adoption of the informal terminology.

Over 120 Blackwall frigates were built by British and Indian yards before the last, the 1857-ton iron ship Melbourne, was built at Blackwall by the Green family in 1875. They were generally considered to be safe and comfortable ships and were employed in premium trades, but were the victims of some of the most celebrated shipwrecks of the 19th century. These included:

- Madagascar, missing between Melbourne, Australia, and London in 1853 with the loss of about 150 lives,
- Dalhousie, sank off Beachy Head on 13 October 1853 with the loss of about 60 passengers and crew,
- Dunbar, wrecked near Sydney Heads on 20 August 1857 with the loss of 121 lives,
- Northfleet, run down and sunk by a steamer in the English Channel on 22 January 1873 with the loss of 320 lives,
- Cospatrick, destroyed by fire south of the Cape of Good Hope on 18 November 1874 with the loss of 473 lives.

A well-known example of later Blackwall frigates was the Parramatta of 1866 and the True Briton of 1046 tons built in 1861. The True Briton made frequent voyages to Australia and New Zealand carrying passengers, convicts and cargo. Photographs of this vessel are on display in the State Library of Victoria.

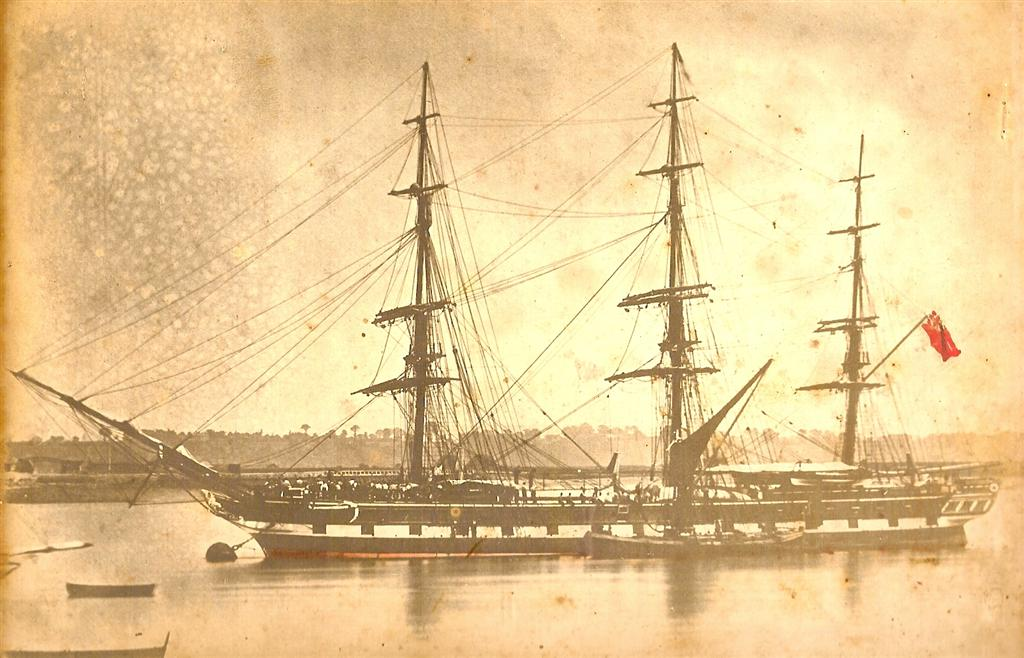
The semi-clipper Clyde (1860) 1,151 tons

By the 1860s, the main difference between Blackwall frigates and clippers was the stern gallery (which "true clippers" never had, though many "semi-clippers" did) and the residual "tumble-home" or hull curvature such that the hull was narrower at deck level than at the waterline) which was greater in a Blackwall frigate than in a clipper or semi clipper.

Both types became superseded as passenger-carrying vessels by steamships during the 1870s and later sailing ships of the type colloquially called windjammers were built for cargo carrying only.

== Sources ==
- Lubbock, Basil (1922). The Blackwall Frigates. Glasgow: Brown, Son & Ferguson. OCLC 1750387.
- Lloyd's Register of Shipping
- Lyon, David (1993). The Navy Sailing List - All the Ships of the Royal Navy built, Purchased and Captured - 1688-1860. London: Conway Maritime Press. ISBN 085177864X. OCLC 29977497.

== See also ==
- Packet boats
