= 1861 in Australia =

- Decades: 1840s; 1850s; 1860s; 1870s; 1880s
- See also: Other events of 1861; Timeline of Australian history

The following lists events that happened during 1861 in Australia.

== Incumbents ==
- Monarch - Victoria

=== Governors ===
Governors of the Australian colonies:

- Governor of New South Wales – Sir William Denison, then John Young, 1st Baron Lisgar
- Governor of Queensland – Sir George Bowen
- Governor of South Australia – Sir Richard G. MacDonnell
- Governor of Tasmania – Sir Henry Young
- Governor of Victoria – Sir Henry Barkly
- Governor of Western Australia – Sir Arthur Kennedy.

=== Premiers ===
Premiers of the Australian colonies:

- Premier of New South Wales – John Robertson, then Charles Cowper
- Premier of Queensland – Robert Herbert
- Premier of South Australia – Thomas Reynolds, then George Waterhouse
- Premier of Tasmania – William Weston, then Thomas Chapman
- Premier of Victoria – Richard Heales, then John O'Shanassy

== Events ==
- 13 May – The Great Comet of 1861 is discovered by John Tebbutt of Windsor, New South Wales.
- 30 June – Lambing Flat riots of Lambing Flat (Young), New South Wales
- 6 July – Robert Palin is hanged in Western Australia following the use of Ordinance 17 Victoria Number 7 to secure the capital punishment of a convict for a crime not normally punishable by death.
- 8 July – The Geelong College is established by Reverend Alexander James Campbell in Newtown, Victoria.
- October – Robertson land acts passed by Parliament of New South Wales.
- 17 October – 19 white colonists, including Horatio Wills owner of station, are murdered in the Cullin-la-ringo massacre. It is the single largest massacre of colonists by Aboriginal people in Australian history. In the weeks afterwards, police, native police and civilian posses hunted down and killed up to 370 members of the Gayiri Aboriginal tribe.
- 6 November – First message sent via the newly completed Sydney to Brisbane telegraph line.

== Arts and literature ==
- 24 May – National Gallery of Victoria founded

== Sport ==
- 7 November – The first Melbourne Cup is held. It is won by Archer. (List of Melbourne Cup winners).

== Births ==
- 12 January – Jack Moses, bush poet (d. 1945)
- 22 January – Sir George Fuller, 22nd Premier of New South Wales (d. 1940)
- 6 February – Sir Alexander Matheson, 3rd Baronet, Western Australian politician (born in the United Kingdom) (d. 1929)
- 21 February – George Elmslie, 25th Premier of Victoria (d. 1918)
- 10 March – Sir John Longstaff, painter and war artist (d. 1941)
- 19 May – Dame Nellie Melba, opera singer (d. 1931)
- 11 June – Sir Alexander Peacock, 20th Premier of Victoria (d. 1933)
- 12 June – James Gardiner, Western Australian politician (born in New Zealand) (d. 1928)
- 13 June – Kate Dwyer, educator, suffragist and labour activist (d. 1949)
- 22 June – John Lemmone, flautist, composer and manager (d. 1949)
- 2 August – Edith Cowan, Western Australian politician and social reformer (d. 1932)
- 27 August – James Ronald, Victorian politician (born in the United Kingdom) (d. 1941)
- 14 September – Margaret Francis Ellen Baskerville, sculptor, water colourist, and educator (d. 1930)
- 18 September – Dame Eadith Walker, heiress and philanthropist (d. 1937)
- 6 October – Thomas Brown, New South Wales politician (d. 1934)
- 2 December – James White, sculptor (born in the United Kingdom) (d. 1918)
- Unknown – Jim Page, Queensland politician (born in the United Kingdom) (d. 1921)

== Deaths ==
- 15 March – James Clow, Presbyterian minister and settler (born in the United Kingdom) (b. 1790)
- 28 June
  - Robert O'Hara Burke, explorer (born in Ireland) (b. 1821)
  - William John Wills, explorer (born in the United Kingdom) (b. 1834)
- 21 October – Hannibal Hawkins Macarthur, New South Wales politician and businessman (born and died in the United Kingdom) (b. 1788)
