= List of burials at Melbourne General Cemetery =

This is a list of notable individuals buried at Melbourne General Cemetery.

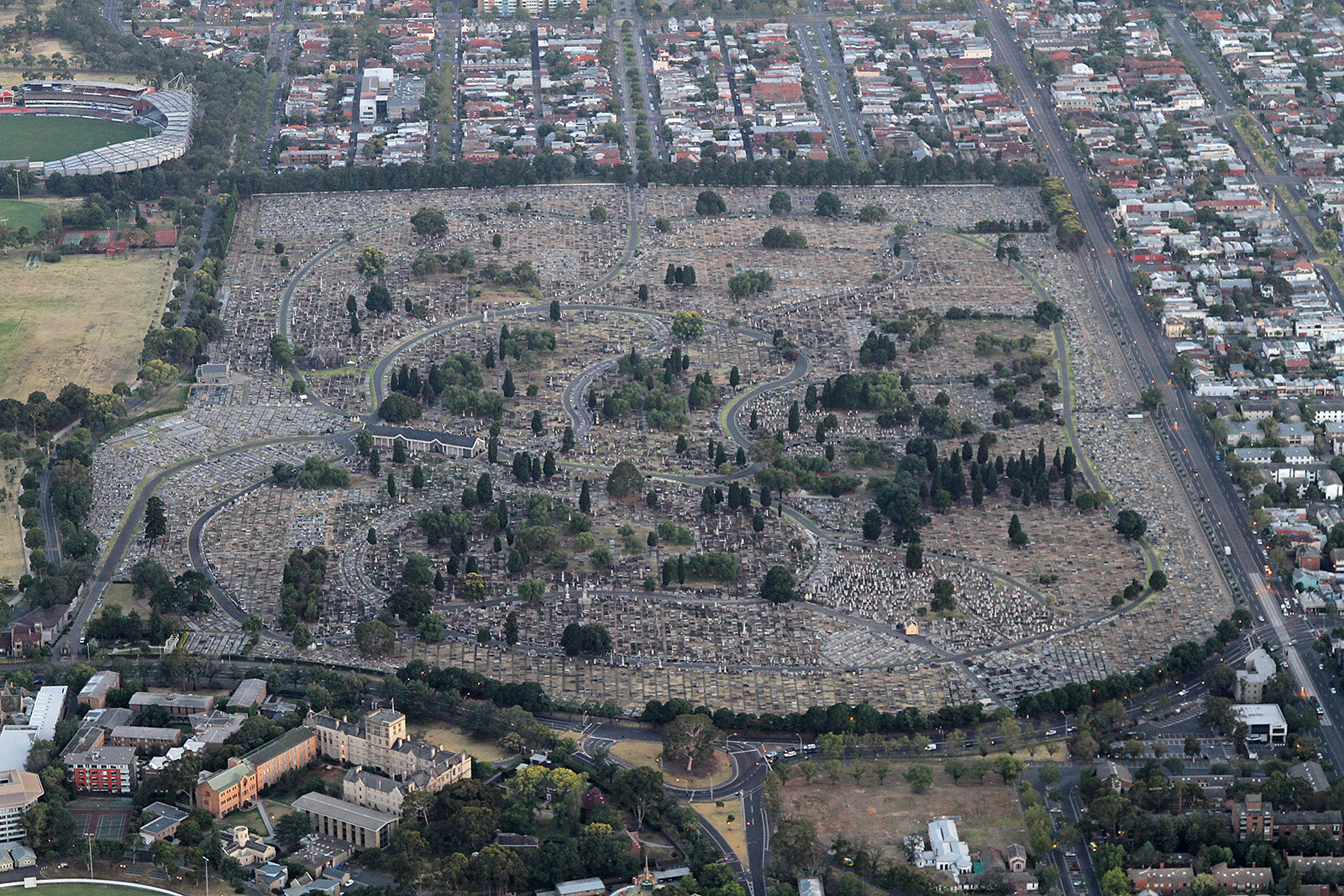
Melbourne General Cemetery

== List of burials ==
=== A ===
- Douglas Alexandra (1922–2000), architect
- Sir Harry Brookes Allen (1854–1926), pathologist

=== B ===
- Mendel Balberyszski (1894–1966), Jewish community leader, historian of the destruction of the Vilna Ghetto in Lithuania.
- Sir Redmond Barry (1813–1880), Acting Chief Justice who sentenced Ned Kelly to hang; instrumental in the foundation of the Royal Melbourne Hospital, the University of Melbourne, and the State Library of Victoria
- Auguste de Bavay (1856–1944), Belgian-born brewer and industrial chemist
- James Beaney (1828–1891), surgeon
- Rivett Bland (1811–1894), colonial administrator and gold miner
- Hugh Brophy (1829–1919), Fenian
- Sir Anthony Brownless (1817–1897), physician, Chancellor of Melbourne University
- Robert O'Hara Burke (1821–1861) explorer (see Burke and Wills expedition)
- William Burnley (1813-1860), politician, early Melbourne pioneer for whom Burnley was named

=== C ===
- Hughie Cairns (1888-1929), jockey, first jockey to win the W.S. Cox Plate and the Melbourne Cup in the same year
- Arthur Calwell (1896–1973), Politician, Leader of the Federal Opposition
- Fanny Cathcart (1833-1880), actress
- Comte Lionel de Moreton de Chabrillan (1818–1858), first French Consul
- William Champ (1808–1892), Premier of Tasmania
- Janet Clarke (1851–1909), benefactor
- Marcus Clarke (1846–1881), novelist & poet, author of For the Term of His Natural Life
- Sir William Clarke (1831–1897), landowner and philanthropist
- James Coates (1901–1947), confidence trickster, racketeer, underworld figure
- George Cockerill (1871-1943), author & journalist
- Kelvin Coe (1946–1992), ballet dancer
- Dale Collins (1897-1956), journalist & author
- Mario Condello (1952–2006), solicitor, underworld figure
- Tom Corrigan (1851–1894), champion Irish jockey, died in a fall at Caulfield
- George Coulthard (1856–1883), sportsman, pioneer of cricket and Australian football

=== D ===
- John King Davis (1884–1967), explorer and navigator
- Derrimut (c1810-1864), Boonwurrung leader in early days of Melbourne
- Louise Dyer (1884–1962), music publisher

=== E ===
- William Henry Ellerker (1837–1891), architect
- George Elmslie (1861–1918), first Labor Premier of Victoria

=== F ===
- John Pascoe Fawkner (1792–1869), one of the founders of Melbourne
- Frederick Federici (1850–1888), opera singer, who created the title role in The Mikado in New York in 1885
- Edmund Finn (1819–1898), journalist, wrote under the nom-de-plume "Garryowen"
- Kathleen Fitzpatrick (1905–1990), historian
- 'Tracker' Forbes (1865-1922), Australian footballer
- James Goodall Francis (1819–1884), Premier of Victoria
- John Freeman, (1822–1900), attempted assassin of Queen Victoria in 1840 under his former name Edward Oxford
- Malcolm Fraser (1930–2015), 22nd Prime Minister of Australia

=== G ===
- Jack Galbally (1910–1990), solicitor, politician
- James Galloway (1828–1860), trade unionist, leader of the Eight Hours' Movement
- S.T. Gill (1818–1880), artist
- Duncan Gillies (1834–1903), Premier of Victoria
- Samuel Gillott (1838–1913), politician, Mayor of Melbourne
- Sir John Gorton (1911–2002), 19th Prime Minister of Australia
- Thomas Grady VC DSM (To más Ó Grádaigh) (1835–1891), Irish Victoria Cross recipient in the Crimean War
- Edward Grayndler (1867–1943), AWU General-Secretary, politician
- Augustus Greeves (1806–1874), politician, Mayor of Melbourne
- Thomas Griffiths (1865–1947), General & Colonial Administrator
- Henry Gritten (1818-1873), English-Australian landscape artist
- Mrs Aeneas Gunn (Jeannie Gunn) (1870–1961), writer, author of We of the Never Never

=== H ===
- Eliza Hall (1847–1916), benefactor, founder of Walter and Eliza Hall Institute of Medical Research
- Greg Ham (1953–2012), musician
- William Hammersley (1826–1886), cricketer, writer, codifier of Australian Rules Football
- Patrick Hannan (1840–1925), discoverer of gold at Kalgoorlie
- Frank Hare (1830–1892), police officer in charge of the Kelly Gang hunt
- Richard Heales (1822–1864), Premier of Victoria
- John Hennings (1835–1898), artist and theatre impresario
- Hermann Herlitz (1834–1920), Lutheran pastor and pioneer
- Robert Hoddle (1794–1881), surveyor, designer of Melbourne
- Henry Hopwood (1813–1869), convict, pioneer, founder of Echuca (Tomb only; body actually buried in Echuca)
- Tom Horan (1854–1916), Test cricketer, wrote on cricket under the nom-de-plume "Felix"
- Anthony Hordern (1788–1869), founder of the department store dynasty
- Sir Charles Hotham (1806–1855), Governor of Victoria

=== I ===
- Sir Isaac Isaacs (1855–1948), the first Australian-born Governor General
- John Iliffe (1846–1914), Dentistry pioneer

=== K ===
- Araluen Kendall (1869–1870), infant daughter of Henry Kendall, commemorated in the poem "Araluen"
- Sir James Kennedy (1882–1954), sportsman and politician
- John King (1838–1872), explorer, sole survivor of Burke and Wills expedition
- Lowe Kong Meng (1830/31-1888), Chinese Australian businessman

=== L ===
- Peter Lalor (1827–1889), leader of the Eureka Stockade
- Walter Lindrum (1898–1960), billiards champion, has a distinctive tombstone in the shape of a billiard table

=== M ===
- John Macadam (1827–1865), scientist and politician, for whom the Macadamia nut was named
- Sir John Henry MacFarland (1851–1935), educator, Chancellor of the University
- Sir John Madden (1844–1918), Chief Justice
- Emily Lydia Mather (1865–1891), victim of Frederick Bailey Deeming
- John Reid McGowan ("Gentleman Jack") (1872–1912), boxing champion
- Evander McIver (1834–1902), architect
- Dame Pattie Menzies (1899–1995), Spouse of Sir Robert Menzies
- Sir Robert Menzies (1894–1978), 12th Prime Minister of Australia
- Louisa Anne Meredith (1812-1895), writer
- Billy Midwinter (1851–1890), Test cricketer for both England and Australia
- Sir Norman Mighell (1894–1955), Anzac and Diplomat
- Robert Clark Morgan (1798 – 1864), Captain of the ship that brought the first settlers to South Australia.
- Sam Morris (1855–1931), Test cricketer

=== N ===
- William Nicholson (1816–1865), Premier of Victoria, Mayor, advocate of secret ballot
- Robert Nickle (1786–1855), Army commander

=== O ===
- Mietta O'Donnell (1950–2001), restaurateur, chef and food writer
- Cornelius O'Mahony (1840–1879), Gaelic scholar and Fenian
- Sir John O'Shanassy (1818–1883), Premier of Victoria
- Edward Oxford (1822-1900), attempted assassin of Queen Victoria, journalist, writer

=== P ===
- Roy Park (1892–1947), Test cricketer, footballer (Melbourne), soldier, doctor
- John Parnell, (1860–1931), soldier & administrator
- Sir James Patterson (1833–1895), Premier of Victoria
- John Giles Price (1808–1857), Magistrate, murdered by convicts at Williamstown

=== R ===
- William Ramsay (1868–1914), developer and founder of Kiwi Boot Polish
- Richard Read (the Younger) (c.1796-1862), colonial artist
- Moses Rintel (1823–1880), pioneering Rabbi
- Robert Russell (1808–1900), architect, pioneer

=== S ===
- Carty Salmon (1860–1917), politician, Speaker of the House of Representatives
- William Sams (1792–1871), colonial administrator, key figure in the founding of Melbourne
- Jack Saunders (1876–1927), Test cricketer
- James Scullin (1876-1953), ninth Prime Minister of Australia
- Sarah Scullin (1880-1962), Spouse of the Prime Minister of Australia
- Clara Seekamp (1819–1908), actress, teacher, writer, first female editor of an Australian newspaper
- James Service (1823–1899), Premier of Victoria
- Hattie Shepparde (1846 – 1874), actress and opera singer - buried with her mother and infant daughter
- John Singleton (1808–1891), physician, philanthropist, evangelical Christian, social reformer; founder of the Royal Children's Hospital and Melbourne City Mission
- John Thomas Smith (1816–1879), publican, Victorian colonial politician, seven times Lord Mayor of Melbourne, for whom Smith St. was named
- Brettena Smyth (1840–1898), feminist, suffragette, freethinker, family planning advocate
- Sir Arthur Snowden (1829–1918), politician, lawyer, mayor
- Captain Frederick Standish (1824-1883), Police Commissioner, diarist
- Thomas Welton Stanford (1832–1918), businessman, brother of Stanford University founder Leland Stanford
- Peter Steele (1939–2012), poet
- James Stephens (1821–1889), stonemason, Chartist and Eight Hours' campaigner
- Joseph Sternberg, (1852–1898), politician
- Alfred Stirling (1902–1981), diplomat
- Davie Strath (1849–1879), golfer
- Selina Sutherland (1839–1909), health and child welfare worker

=== T ===
- Julian Thomas (1843–1896), journalist, wrote under the nom-de-plume "The Vagabond"
- Sir John Thurston (1836–1897), Fijian colonial administrator
- Thomas Topping (1828–1895), stonemason, Eight Hours' campaign pioneer
- Elizabeth Tripp (1809–1899), educational pioneer
- Gerard Tucker (1885–1974), founder of the Brotherhood of St Laurence

=== V ===
- Julie Vieusseux (1820–1878), educator and artist

=== W ===
- Sir Henry Weedon (1859–1921), Lord Mayor and parliamentarian
- Clarence Whistler (1856–1885), wrestler
- William John Wills (1834–1861), explorer (see Burke and Wills expedition)
- Edward Wilson (1813–1878), journalist
- Ray Wilson (1910–1938), jockey
- John Wroe (1782-1863), religious visionary, founder of the Christian Israelites
- Samuel Wynn (1891–1982), restaurateur, wine merchant

=== Y ===
- Florence Young (1870–1920), actress & singer

=== Z ===
- Traugott Zwar (1876–1947), soldier, writer, surgeon
