= 1859 in Australia =

- Decades: 1830s; 1840s; 1850s; 1860s; 1870s
- See also: Other events of 1859; Timeline of Australian history

The following lists events that happened during 1859 in Australia.

== Incumbents ==
- Monarch - Victoria

=== Governors ===
Governors of the Australian colonies:

- Governor of New South Wales – Sir William Denison
- Governor of Queensland – Sir George Bowen
- Governor of South Australia – Sir Richard MacDonnell
- Governor of Tasmania – Sir Henry Young
- Governor of Victoria – Sir Henry Barkly
- Governor of Western Australia as a Crown Colony – Sir Arthur Kennedy

=== Premiers ===
Premiers of the Australian colonies:

- Premier of New South Wales – Charles Cowper, William Forster
- Premier of Queensland – Robert Herbert
- Premier of South Australia – Richard Hanson
- Premier of Tasmania – Francis Smith
- Premier of Victoria – John O'Shanassy, William Nicholson

== Events ==
- 14 May – Melbourne Football Club is founded.
- 6 June – The colony of Queensland is established by decree of Queen Victoria.
- July – Geelong Football Club is founded.
- 5 August – The passenger steamship SS Admella is shipwrecked on a submerged reef near Mount Gambier South Australia with the loss of 89 lives.
- 6 October – Thomas Austin takes 24 rabbits and 5 hares to Australia in order to release them there as a game. They will multiply exponentially.
- The first permanent educational institution for girls, the East Leigh, is founded in Melbourne by Elizabeth Tripp.
- Undated – A retaliatory mass-slaughter of Indigenous Australians occurs in the Hospital Creek Massacre.

== Births ==
- 24 March – Hugh de Largie, Western Australian politician (born in the United Kingdom) (d. 1947)
- 23 April – Bella Guerin, feminist and suffragist (d. 1923)
- 25 April – Joseph Maiden, botanist (born in the United Kingdom) (d. 1925)
- 16 June – John Russell, impressionist painter (d. 1930)
- 28 November – Richard Godfrey Rivers, artist (born in the United Kingdom) (d. 1925)
