= 1860 in Australia =

- Decades: 1840s; 1850s; 1860s; 1870s; 1880s
- See also: Other events of 1860; Timeline of Australian history

The following lists events that happened during 1860 in Australia.

== Incumbents ==
=== Governors ===
Governors of the Australian colonies:

- Governor of New South Wales – Sir William Denison
- Governor of Queensland – Sir George Bowen
- Governor of South Australia – Sir Richard G. MacDonnell
- Governor of Tasmania – Sir Henry Young
- Governor of Victoria – Sir Henry Barkly
- Governor of Western Australia – Sir Arthur Kennedy.

=== Premiers ===
Premiers of the Australian colonies:

- Premier of New South Wales – William Forster until 8 March then John Robertson
- Premier of Queensland – Robert Herbert
- Premier of South Australia – Richard Hanson until 9 May then Thomas Reynolds
- Premier of Tasmania – Francis Smith until 1 November then William Weston
- Premier of Victoria – William Nicholson until 26 November then Richard Heales

== Events ==
- 20 August – Burke and Wills expedition sets off from Royal Park, Melbourne at about 4 p.m. watched by around 15,000 spectators.
- 12 November – The Victorian College for the Deaf is opened in a small house in Peel Street Windsor.
- 12 December – Initial riots on the Lambing Flat goldfields near present-day Young, New South Wales.

== Births ==
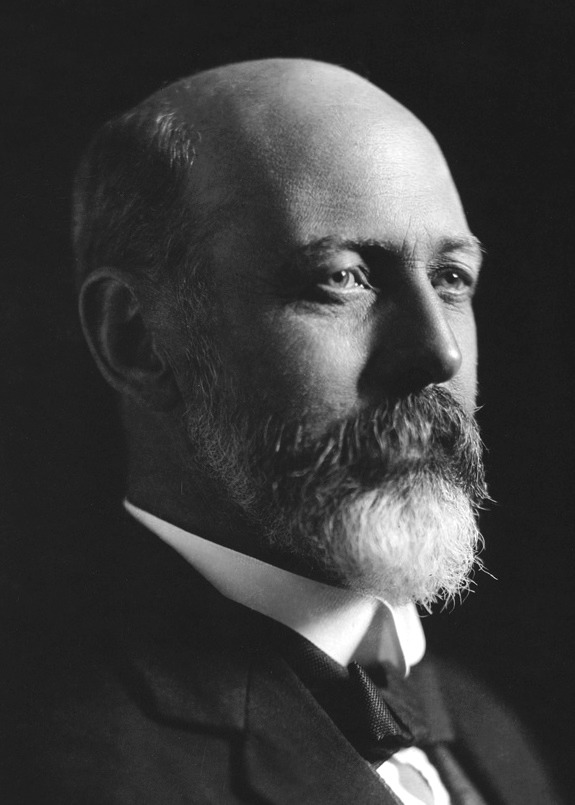
Sir Joseph Cook

- 6 April – Henry Willis, New South Wales politician (d. 1950)
- 20 June – Jack Worrall, Australian rules footballer (Fitzroy), cricketer and journalist (d. 1937)
- 23 June – Sir Walter Baldwin Spencer, evolutionary biologist, anthropologist, and ethnologist (born in the United Kingdom) (d. 1929)
- 27 July – Carty Salmon, Victorian politician (d. 1917)
- 25 August – Charles McDonald, Queensland politician (d. 1925)
- 6 September – May Jordan McConnel, trade unionist and suffragist (d. 1929)
- 25 September – John Hope, 7th Earl of Hopetoun, 1st Governor-General of Australia (born in the United Kingdom) (d. 1908)
- 7 November – Edward Millen, New South Wales politician (born in the United Kingdom) (d. 1923)
- 18 November – Charles Kenningham, opera singer and actor (born in the United Kingdom) (d. 1925)
- 7 December – Sir Joseph Cook, 6th Prime Minister of Australia (d. 1947)
- Unknown – Thomas Kennedy, Victorian politician (d. 1929)

== Deaths ==
- 31 March – Frederick Irwin, Acting Governor of Western Australia (born in Ireland and died in the United Kingdom) (b. 1794)
- 1 July – Robert Thomas, newspaper proprietor (born in the United Kingdom) (b. 1781)
