= 1856 in Australia =

- Decades: 1830s; 1840s; 1850s; 1860s; 1870s
- See also: Other events of 1856; Timeline of Australian history

The following lists events that happened during 1856 in Australia.

== Incumbents ==
=== Governors ===
Governors of the Australian colonies:

- Governor of New South Wales – Sir William Denison
- Governor of South Australia – Sir Richard MacDonnell
- Governor of Tasmania – Sir Henry Young
- Governor of Victoria – Sir Henry Barkly
- Governor of Western Australia as a Crown Colony – Sir Arthur Kennedy.

=== Premiers ===
Premiers of the Australian colonies:

- Premier of New South Wales – Stuart Donaldson from 6 June to 25 August then Charles Cowper to 2 October then Henry Parker
- Premier of Queensland – office not created until 1859
- Premier of South Australia – Boyle Travers Finniss from 24 October
- Premier of Tasmania – William Champ from 1 November
- Premier of Victoria – Dr William Haines
- Premier of Western Australia – office not created until 1890

== Events ==
- 6 January – French musician and composer Nicolas-Charles Bochsa dies in Sydney.
- 7 February – Tasmanian Electoral Act introduced the secret ballot, which was known elsewhere, in particular in the United States as the "Australian ballot"
- 19 March – The Electoral Act 1856 introduced the secret ballot in Victoria
- 2 April – South Australia introduced the secret ballot
- 11 April – At a public meeting in Melbourne, Dr Thomas Embling repeated the slogan "eight hours labour, eight hours recreation, eight hours rest".
- 22 May – First Parliament of New South Wales opened by the governor, Sir William Denison
- 24 June – Queen Victoria makes Norfolk Island a separate settlement from Tasmania to be administered by the Governor of New South Wales.
- 23 September – The town of Perth, Western Australia, is proclaimed a City by letters patent from Queen Victoria.
- 25 November – The first Parliament of Victoria is officially opened by the Acting Governor Edward Macarthur.

== Exploration and settlement ==
- 1 January – The name Tasmania officially adopted to replace Van Diemen's Land which was felt to have too many convict connotations.
- 8 June – Pitcairn Islanders arrived on Norfolk Island; the last convict had left and the island was no longer a penal colony. Queen Victoria granted the island to the Pitcairners as a home. Bounty Day is celebrated each year in Norfolk Island to commemorate the event.
- Suburb of Goodna founded in Queensland, Australia – Originally part of NSW, its 150-year anniversary was celebrated in 2006.

== Births ==
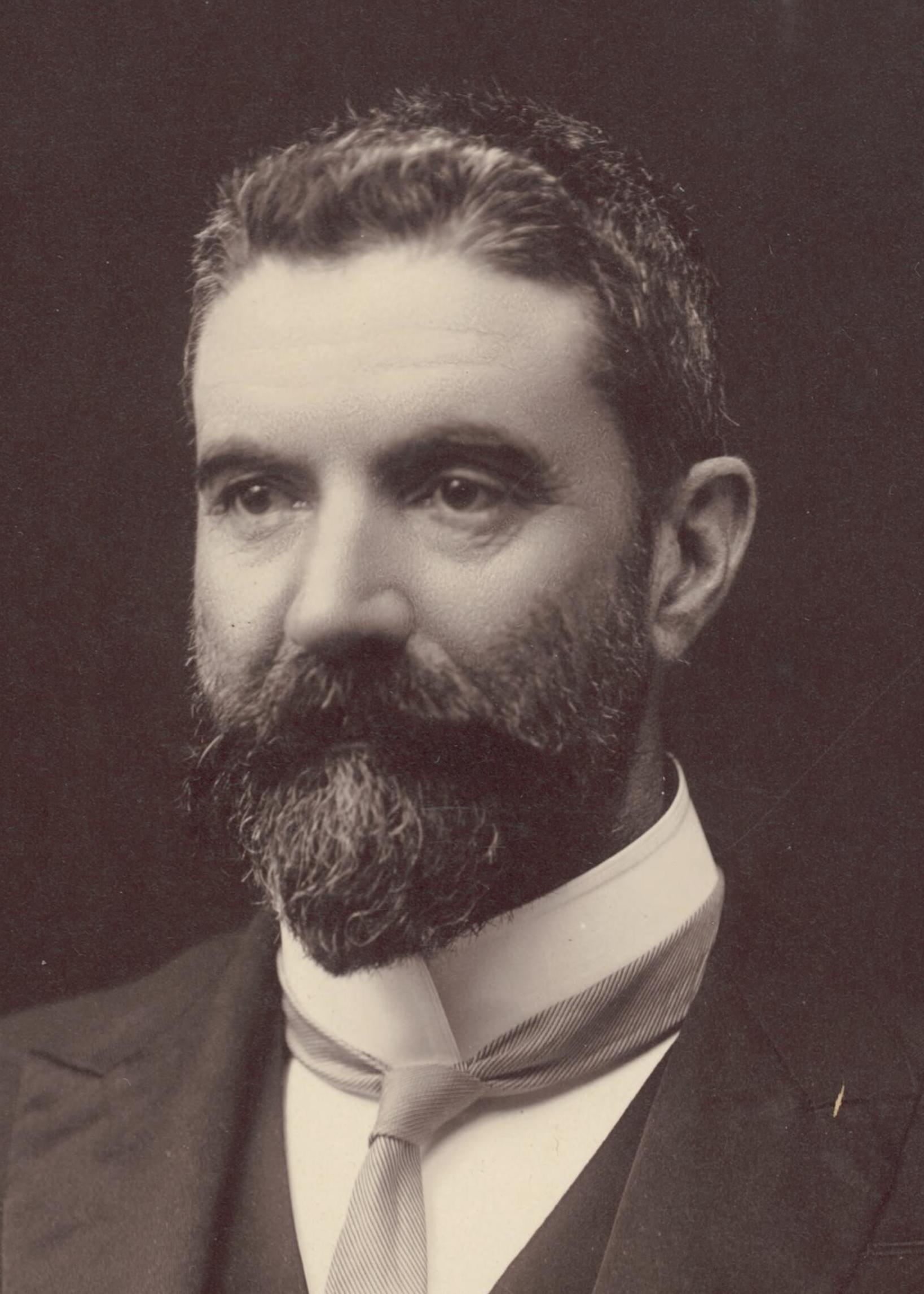
Alfred Deakin

- 25 January – Sir John Hoad, 4th Chief of the General Staff (d. 1911)
- 8 March – Tom Roberts, artist (born in the United Kingdom) (d. 1931)
- 12 March – Rosetta Jane Birks, suffragist (d. 1911)
- 11 April – Sydney Smith, New South Wales politician (d. 1934)
- 15 June – William Henry O'Malley Wood, banker, public servant and surveyor (d. 1941)
- 18 June – Sir Robert Best, Victorian politician and lawyer (d. 1946)
- 3 August – Alfred Deakin, 2nd Prime Minister of Australia (d. 1919)
- 19 September – Sir Arthur Morgan, 16th Premier of Queensland (d. 1916)
- 9 October – Sir Thomas Ewing, New South Wales politician (d. 1920)
- 3 December – George Leake, 3rd Premier of Western Australia (d. 1902)

== Deaths ==
- 30 January – William Buckley, convict (born in the United Kingdom) (b. 1780)
- 3 May – John Wollaston, settler and clergyman (born in the United Kingdom) (b. 1791)
- 17 October – William Allen, philanthropist and businessman (born in the United Kingdom) (b. 1790)
