= 1857 in Australia =

- Decades: 1830s; 1840s; 1850s; 1860s; 1870s
- See also: Other events of 1857; Timeline of Australian history

The following lists events that happened during 1857 in Australia.

== Incumbents ==
- Monarch - Victoria

=== Governors ===
Governors of the Australian colonies:

- Governor of New South Wales – Sir William Denison
- Governor of South Australia – Sir Richard MacDonnell
- Governor of Tasmania – Sir Henry Young
- Governor of Victoria – Sir Henry Barkly
- Governor of Western Australia as a Crown Colony – Sir Arthur Kennedy

=== Premiers ===
Premiers of the Australian colonies:

- Premier of New South Wales – Henry Parker to 7 September then Charles Cowper
- Premier of South Australia – Boyle Travers Finniss, John Baker, Robert Torrens, Richard Hanson
- Premier of Tasmania – William Champ, Thomas Gregson, William Weston, Francis Smith
- Premier of Victoria – Dr William Haines, John O'Shanassy

== Events ==
- 13 May – St Kilda railway station, Melbourne is opened.
- 4 July – Anti-Chinese riots occur in the goldfields of the Buckland Valley, Victoria.
- 25 July – Matthew Blagden Hale is consecrated as the first Bishop of Perth in a ceremony at the Lambeth Palace Chapel.
- 20 August – The Dunbar is wrecked at the entrance to Sydney Harbour, killing 121 passengers.
- 27 October – 12 people (11 settlers and 1 Aboriginal station-hand) are killed by Iman Aboriginals as they slept in the Hornet Bank massacre. It has been moderately estimated that 150 Aboriginal people succumbed in subsequent punitive missions conducted by Native Police, private settler militias, and by William Fraser in or around Eurombah district. Indiscriminate shootings of "over 300" Aboriginal men, women, and children, however, were reportedly conducted by private punitive expedition some 400 kilometres eastward at various stations in the Wide Bay district alone.
- In Victoria, Australia, one adult male in 7 is Chinese.

== Births ==
- 6 January – Hugh Mahon, Western Australian politician (born in Ireland) (d. 1931)
- 26 February – Alfred Waldron, Australian rules footballer (Carlton) (d. 1929)
- 3 March – Robert Hutchinson, Western Australian politician (d. 1918)
- 21 March – Alice Henry, suffragist, journalist and trade unionist (d. 1943)
- 25 March – Francis Clarke, New South Wales politician (d. 1939)
- 9 May – Sir Sidney Kidman, pastoralist and entrepreneur (d. 1935)
- 12 May – Arthur Green, Anglican bishop (born in the United Kingdom) (d. 1944)
- 31 May – William Story, South Australian politician (d. 1924)
- 13 June – Hubert Newman Wigmore Church, poet (d. 1932)
- 14 June – Adolphus Taylor, New South Wales politician and journalist (d. 1900)
- 25 June – Louis Gabriel, photographer (d. 1927)
- 1 August – Jack Harry, cricketer (d. 1919)
- 2 August – Allan McDougall, New South Wales politician (d. 1924)
- 7 September – John McIlwraith, cricketer (d. 1938)
- 19 September – John Livingston, South Australian politician (d. 1935)
- 12 November – Samuel Mauger, Victorian politician (d. 1936)
- 2 December – Thomas Lavelle, New South Wales politician (d. 1944)
- 5 December – Cyril Cameron, Tasmanian politician and soldier (d. 1941)
- 21 December – Joseph Carruthers, 16th Premier of New South Wales (d. 1932)

== Deaths ==
- 10 May – John Busby, surveyor and civil engineer (born in the United Kingdom) (b. 1765)
- 10 August – Frank McCallum, bushranger (born in the United Kingdom) (b. 1823)
- 29 August – Archibald Clunes Innes, soldier and pastoralist (born in the United Kingdom) (b. 1799)
