= Pyrenees (Victoria) =

Wine region in Victoria, Australia

Coordinates: 37°6′59.49″S 143°18′48.82″E

- Wine region
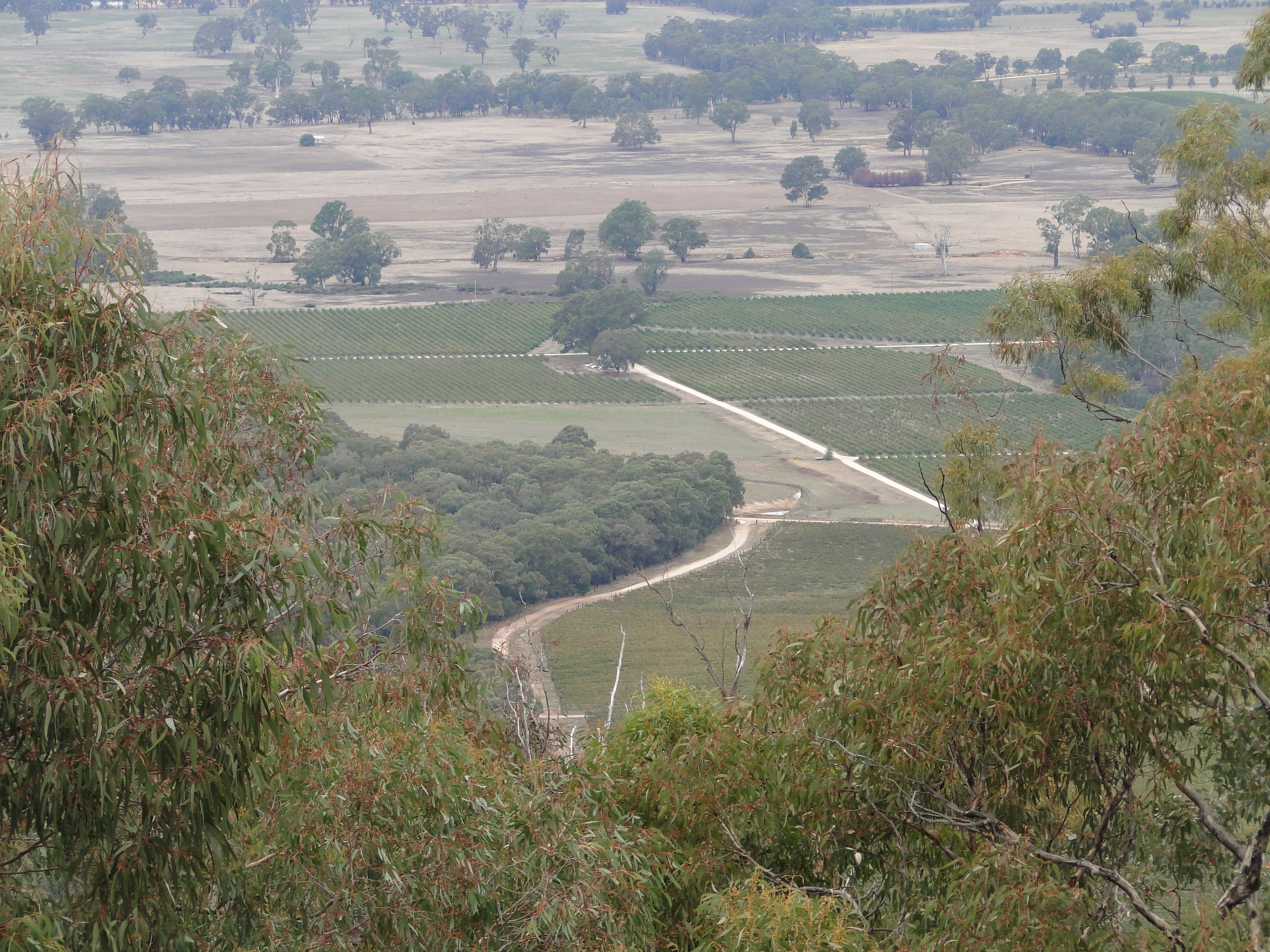
- Vineyards near Avoca, viewed from the Pyrenees ranges
- Type: Australian geographical indication
- Year established: 2000
- Years of wine industry: 1848–present
- Country: Australia
- Part of: Western Victoria

The Pyrenees is a wine-producing region centred on the Pyrenees ranges in Victoria, Australia near the town of Avoca.

The Pyrenees Ranges are at the southern end of The Great Dividing Range with altitudes ranging from 300 to over 750 m (approximately 980–2460 ft). Main peaks in the range include Mount Avoca (747 m) and Mount Warrenmang (537 m).

== Exploration ==
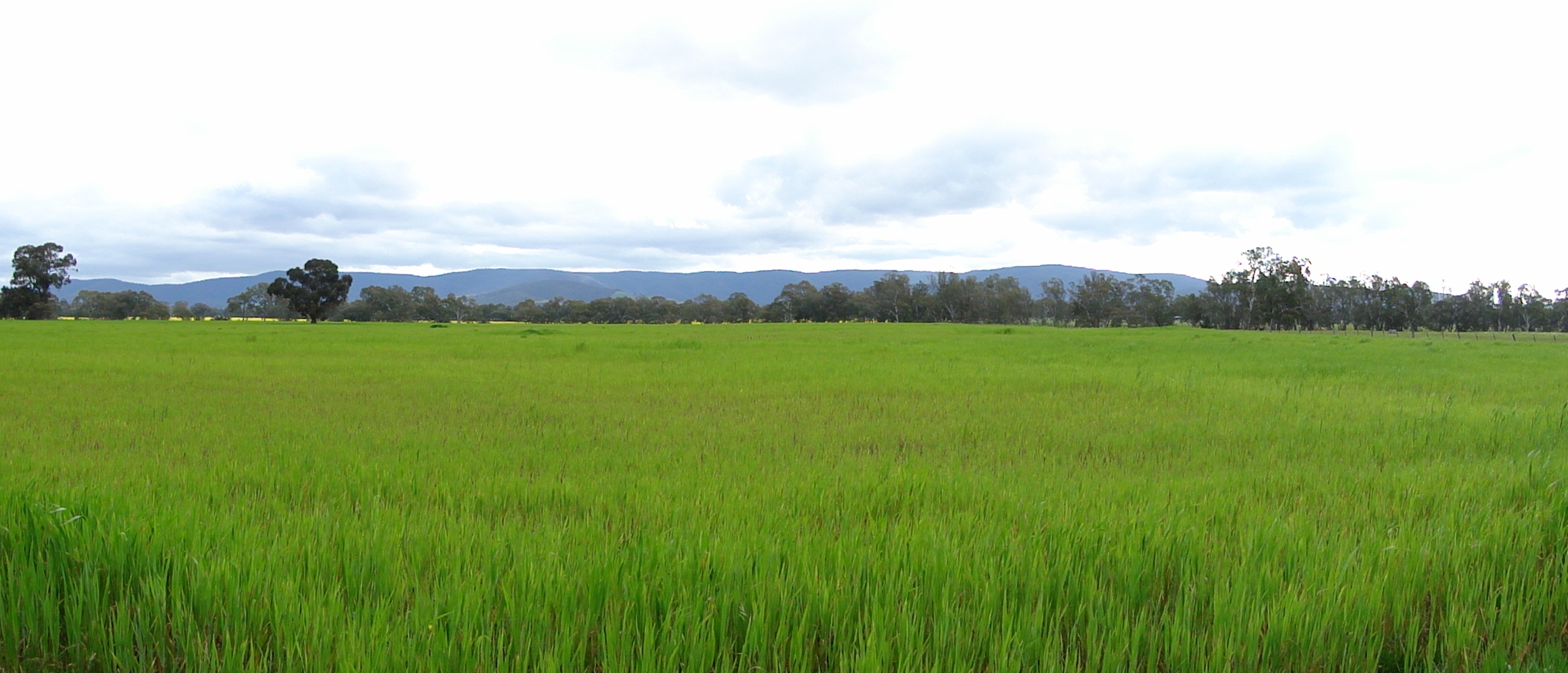
The Pyrenees ranges, as seen from Avoca

The explorer and surveyor Thomas Mitchell was the first European recorded to have travelled through the district on his 1836 journey of exploration. The ranges reminded him of the Pyrenees in Europe where he had served as an army officer, hence the name he gave them. He found the area more temperate in climate and better watered than inland New South Wales, and he encouraged settlers to take up land in the region he described as "Australia Felix".

== Wine ==
Vines were first planted in the region in 1858. Several wine growers produced and sold wine in the region in the late 1800s and early part of the twentieth century. The pioneer of the region Edwin Horatio Mackereth had his vineyard sold to a dairy farmer in 1929 by his descendants. Another early producer Kofoeds survived until 1947. The 1960s saw the re-establishment of vineyards in the area by Nathan & Wyeth in conjunction with the French Cognac producer Rémy Martin planting grapes in 1963. The official planting ceremony on 1 June 1963 included Victorian Government Minister for Lands, The Minister of State Development and Avoca Shire President. Since the 1970s the region has been a significant producer of full-bodied red wines based on Shiraz and Cabernet Sauvignon grape varieties.

The original eight wineries of the region in the 1970s and 1980s included: Chateau Rémy (now known as Blue Pyrenees Estate), Dalwhinnie Vineyard, Mount Avoca Vineyard, Mountain Creek, Summerfield Vineyards, Redbank Winery (now known as Sally's Paddock), Taltarni Vineyards and Warrenmang Vineyard. Warrenmang bought Mountain Creek in the 1990s and the wineries of the region now number almost thirty with a second wave of plantings and investment in the 1990s. The original vineyards and wineries planted in the 1970 centred around the towns of Moonambel and Avoca. while the 1990s saw large vineyards planted in the Landsborough valley between Landsborough and Elmhurst. Plantings now extend from near Waubra in the south to St Arnaud in the north. The main white varieties planted include Sauvignon blanc, Chardonnay and Viognier with smaller plantings of Semillon and Pinot Grigio, while the main varieties of Shiraz and Cabernet Sauvignon are well supported by a range of other varieties from France such as Merlot, Cabernet Franc and Grenache, Italy for Sangiovese, Nebbiolo and Lagrein and Spain for Tempranillo.

Tourism is a very important part of the region's economy, with many wineries offering cellar-door tastings. Accommodation and dining are available at several of the wineries as the region continues to develop tourism infrastructure. Exports are also significant for many wineries with sales into China, the US and Scandinavia.

== List of wineries (2017) ==
- Amherst
- Berrys Bridge
- Bigibila
- Blue Pyrenees Estate
- M. Chapoutier
- Dalwhinnie
- Dogrock
- Equus at Moonambel
- Forest Gate Estate
- Glenlofty
- Grape Farm Winery
- Gwynnyth Vineyard
- Kara Kara
- Kenred
- Lamplough Estate
- Mitchell Harris
- Mount Avoca
- Peerick Vineyard
- Pyren Vineyard
- Quartz Hill
- Quoin Hill
- Sally's Paddock
- Summerfield
- Taltarni
- Warrenmang Vineyard & Resort
- Wimmera Hills

== See also ==
- Australian wine
- Victorian wine
