= Hugh Francis Brophy =

Fenian and supporter of Irish independence

Hugh Brophy
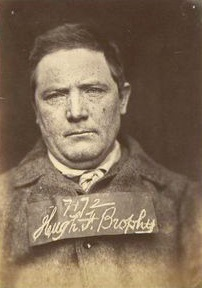
- Hugh Francis Brophy photographed in Mountjoy Prison in 1866
- Born: 1829; Portlaoise, County Laois, Ireland
- Died: 11 June 1919 (aged 90); Melbourne, Victoria, Australia
- Occupation: Builder
- Spouse: Margaret Freaney (m.1873–1919; his death)
- Children: 7

Hugh Francis Brophy (1829 – 11 June 1919) was a leading Fenian and staunch supporter of Irish independence. He was convicted for his part in a plot to overthrow British rule in Ireland and establish a republic, and was sentenced to penal servitude. This sentence was later commuted to transportation to Australia.

== Early life ==
Brophy was likely born in Maryborough, now Portlaoise, the main city of what was then Queens County, now County Laois, Ireland. He was the son of Thomas Brophy and Bridget Traynor.

== Introduction to Fenianism ==
Brophy became more involved in the Fenian movement after he was introduced to the fenian leader Jeremiah O'Donovan Rossa. He became close to James Stephens, the founder of the Irish Republican Brotherhood, and was arrested along with Stephens following discovery of a planned uprising.

== Conviction and transportation ==
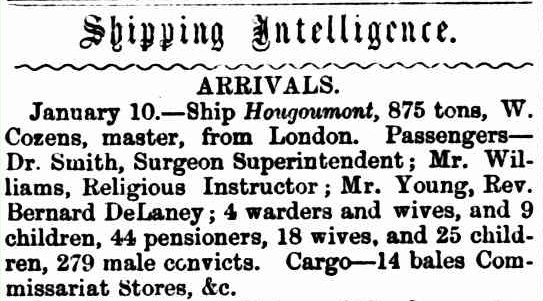
News clipping from the Perth Gazette and West Australian Times, 17 January 1868, announcing the arrival of the Hougoumont in Fremantle

Brophy was convicted at the Dublin Assizes and sentenced to ten years' penal servitude. He spent some time in the Richmond (Bridewell) and Grangegorman remand prisons as well as Kilmainham Gaol, along with O'Donovan. The sentence of treason and felony was subsequently commuted to transportation to colonial Western Australia. In October 1867, along with more than 60 other Fenians, including O'Donovan, Cornelius O'Mahony and Joseph Nunan he set sail on board Hougoumont. This ship was to be the last to transport convicts to Australia. The voyage was a relatively peaceful one, monotony being one of the major concerns, and the ship docked at Fremantle on 9 January 1868.

== Life in Australia ==
Following his pardon in 1869 Brophy remained in Western Australia and was involved in the building of the first bridge across the Swan River and went into partnership with Joseph Nunan.

== Later life ==
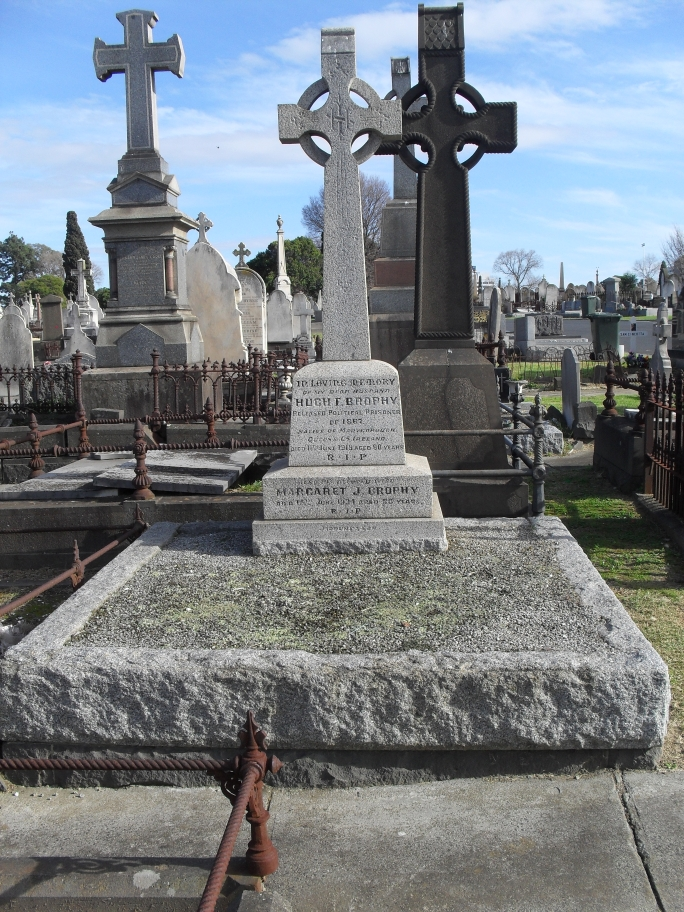
Hugh Francis Brophy's gravestone

In April 1873, after moving to Victoria the previous year, Brophy married Margaret Freaney at the old St Mary's church in West Melbourne. They established their home in Carlton North and Brophy found work at his old trade. Together they had several children; Thomas, Bernard, Frank, Joseph, Michael, Sarah Ann and John, who died in infancy. Hugh Brophy continued his work in the building and construction industry and acted as the Clerk of Works during the construction of the new St Mary's Church around 1900.

Brophy became a member of several groups including the United Irish League and the Melbourne Celtic Club. He went on to become one of the founders of the Irish National League in Melbourne and supporter of the local Irish community before his death in 1919 aged 90 years. A fine monument of local stone was erected over his grave in the Melbourne General Cemetery which now includes other family members.

== Cultural references ==
Hugh Brophy's picture from Mountjoy Prison is used in the label of 19 Crimes Shiraz 2017 wine bottle, from wine producer in Nuriootpa, South Australia. The label celebrates the criminals turned into colonists, the "rules they broke and the culture they built".
