= Cornelius O'Mahony =

Political prisoner and settler of Western Australia

- Born: 1840; Macroom, County Cork, Ireland
- Died: 5 March 1879 (aged 38–39); Melbourne, Australia
- Occupation: Teacher

Cornelius O'Mahony (1840 – 5 March 1879) was a Gaelic scholar, teacher, Fenian and staunch supporter of Irish independence. He was tried and convicted of conspiracy and sentenced to prison, only to be later transported to Australia.

== Early life ==
O'Mahony was born about 1840 in Macroom, County Cork, Ireland but later moved to Dublin. He grew up in a time where starvation and disease were commonplace, particularly in the countryside, during the period commonly referred to as the Great Famine. Given his later pursuits, it is fair to say he came from a family which either owned land or had the money with which to educate him.

== The Fenian movement ==
By the time O'Mahony was 20 years old he had become a close follower of James Stephens and his fight to create a free and independent Ireland by removing the perceived tyranny of the British. To this extent, he became a member of the Irish Republican Brotherhood (IRB). Joseph Denieffe (1906) writes of him as "good and earnest Cornelius O'Mahony ...an unsophisticated but gifted school teacher". In 1862 O'Mahony was working as a schoolmaster in the 'training school' located in Marlborough Street, Dublin, and was useful in introducing like-minded educated young men to the cause.

O'Mahony resigned from his post with the National Board of Education, and the National schools of Ireland, in 1863 to concentrate on his work with the IRB and its newspaper The Irish People. He remained on the paper's staff as assistant bookkeeper and part-time journalist until it was raided and closed down in 1865 when the British felt that an armed uprising was imminent. At that time he was arrested along with Charles Kickham, Thomas Clarke Luby, John O'Leary, Jeremiah O'Donovan and others. The charges laid at Kilmainham Gaol included, "Conspiring To Depose The Queen, To Compel Her Majesty To Change Her Measures And Counsels, To Move And Stir Foreigners To Invade Ireland" An abortive uprising known as the Fenian Rising took place in 1867 but was quickly put down.

== Conviction and Transportation ==
For his participation in the rebellion O'Mahony was convicted at the Assizes in Dublin on 16 January 1866 following a retrial, as the first jury was dismissed by the judge. The defence implored the subsequent jury to show leniency in his case and he was eventually sentenced to five years penal servitude. His sentence was subsequently commuted to transportation to colonial Western Australia. In October 1867, along with more than 60 other Fenians, including O'Donovan and Hugh Francis Brophy, he set sail on board Hougoumont. This ship was to be the last to transport convicts to Australia. The voyage was a relatively peaceful one, monotony being one of the major concerns, and the ship docked at Fremantle on 9 January 1868.

== Life in Australia ==
Within a year of his arrival in Australia, O'Mahony had been granted a ticket of leave and on 18 May 1869 he received his Certificate of freedom as part of a general amnesty granted by the government led by William Ewart Gladstone. Following his freedom he was engaged as a teacher of senior grades at the Catholic Boys' School, Perth, later known as the 'Assisted' school. While carrying out his teaching duties he also held the position of Honorary Secretary of the Catholic Institute in Perth which was responsible for assisting local Catholic schools and their teachers.

In 1874, O'Mahony married Mary Butler and they went on to produce two children, O'Connell Daniel in 1875 and Honora Mary in 1877. Mary, born in Kilkenny, Ireland arrived in Western Australia in 1864 at age 15 and later worked in a number of important businesses including a draper's. Hundreds of locals, including members of government, attended her funeral in 1914 as she was a well-known and well-respected member of the local community.

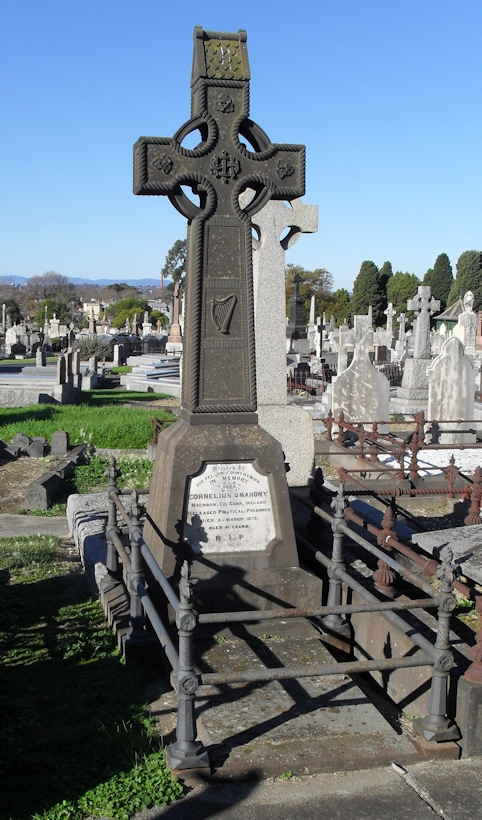
Monument erected over the grave of the fenian, Cornelius O'Mahony

== Later years ==
Following the birth of his daughter Honora in 1877 O'Mahony left Western Australia to seek better conditions in Victoria. He left behind both the grim reminders of his convict past and his young family. On arriving in Melbourne he chose to settle in the suburb of West Melbourne which had a large Irish population. With his prior experience he was asked to take up the position of head teacher at St Mary's Primary School, West Melbourne.

O'Mahony worked at the school for less than two years before he was taken ill, dying shortly after of typhoid fever on 5 March 1879. A contemporary newspaper report indicated that the death rate from typhoid in the suburb was extremely high for that period and that that figure exceeded the worst statistic for equivalent towns in Great Britain during times of epidemic.

Following his death O'Mahony's funeral took place at St Mary Star of the Sea, West Melbourne and then in procession moved to his burial at the Melbourne General Cemetery. Hundreds of people, including schoolchildren, took part, many wearing green scarves. As a sign of respect and in recognition of his life and work his friends within the Irish community, assisted by Morgan Jageurs, collected funds to construct and erect a fitting memorial for him. One such method was to raffle his personal library at the cost of one shilling per ticket. Shortly after his burial a carved Celtic cross made of local Bluestone was raised over the grave, its plaque bearing the inscription, "In Memory of Cornelius O'Mahony, Macroom, County Cork, Ireland, Released Political Prisoner, Died 5th March, 1879. R.I.P."
