= Frank Brophy (footballer) =

Australian rules footballer

Personal information
- Full name: Hugh Francis Brophy
- Born: 29 May 1879; Fitzroy, Victoria
- Died: 15 September 1932 (aged 53); Fitzroy, Victoria
- Original team: St Ignatius Juniors

Playing career^{1}
Years	Club	Games (Goals)
1902–1903	Fitzroy	26 (20)
- ^{1} Playing statistics correct to the end of 1903.

Hugh Francis Brophy (29 May 1879 – 15 September 1932) was an Australian rules footballer who played with Fitzroy in the Victorian Football League (VFL).

== Biography ==
Brophy was a son of Hugh Francis Brophy and Margaret Freaney who were born in Ireland and came to Australia during the nineteenth century. His father, who was involved in the building trade, was a staunch supporter of Irish independence his entire life and had arrived in Western Australia in 1868 after being convicted and transported for taking part in a Fenian uprising a few years earlier.

Frank Brophy, born in Carlton North, Victoria attended St. Colman's School in Fitzroy and later entered the department of the Postmaster General as a linesman. In December 1903 he fell off a roof while working on a local building and seriously injured his back and skull. This event forced him to alter his career to that of draughtsman.
