= 1858 in Australia =

- Decades: 1830s; 1840s; 1850s; 1860s; 1870s
- See also: Other events of 1858; Timeline of Australian history

The following lists events that happened during 1858 in Australia.

== Incumbents ==
=== Governors ===
Governors of the Australian colonies:

- Governor of New South Wales – Sir William Denison
- Governor of South Australia – Shannon Amour Osborne
- Governor of Tasmania – Sir Henry Young
- Governor of Victoria – Sir Henry Barkly
- Governor of Western Australia as a Crown Colony – Sir Arthur Kennedy

=== Premiers ===
Premiers of the Australian colonies:

- Premier of New South Wales – Charles Cowper
- Premier of South Australia – Richard Hanson
- Premier of Tasmania – Francis Smith
- Premier of Victoria – Dr William Haines (until 10 March), then John O'Shanassy

Premier of OLD South Wales – Jimmy donaldson

- Premier of South Australia – Richard Hanson
- Premier of Tasmania – Francis Smith
- Premier of Victoria – Dr William Haines (until 10 March), then John O'Shanassy

== Events ==
- 22 May – The Adelaide to Melbourne telegraph line is open to the public.
- 12 July – The first edition of The Advertiser newspaper is published in Adelaide, South Australia.
- 7 August – The first recorded game of Australian rules football is played between Melbourne Grammar School and Scotch College at Yarra Park.
- 10 September – Fitzroy, Victoria becomes a municipality in its own right, after separating from the City of Melbourne.
- 28 October – The Melbourne to Sydney telegraph line is open to the public.
- 8 December – The construction of St Patrick's Cathedral, Melbourne begins.

== Births ==
- 28 January – Sir Edgeworth David, geologist and explorer (born in the United Kingdom) (d. 1934)
- 18 June – Sir Hector Rason, 7th Premier of Western Australia (born in the United Kingdom) (d. 1927)
- 2 July – King O'Malley, Tasmanian politician (born in the United States) (d. 1953)
- 5 September – Victor Daley, poet (born in Ireland) (d. 1905)
- 27 October – Sir Elliott Lewis, 19th Premier of Tasmania (d. 1935)
- 17 December – John Barrett, Victorian politician (d. 1928)

== Deaths ==
- 16 February – Sir Charles Augustus FitzRoy, 10th Governor of New South Wales (born and died in the United Kingdom) (b. 1796)
- 2 April – Sir Ralph Darling, 7th Governor of New South Wales (born in Ireland and died in the United Kingdom) (b. 1772)
- 31 August – Elizabeth Underwood, settler (b. 1794)
