= Mount Avoca Vineyard =

Coordinates: 37.0835°S 143.4156°E

Mount Avoca
- Location: Shire of Pyrenees, Victoria, Australia
- Wine region: Pyrenees
- Formerly: Mount Avoca Vineyard
- Founded: 1970
- First vines planted: 1970
- First vintage: 1976
- Key people: Matthew Barry
- Cases/yr: 10,000
- Known for: Shiraz
- Varietals: Shiraz, Cabernet Sauvignon, Sauvignon blanc, Merlot, Chardonnay, Cabernet Franc, Tempranillo, Semillon, Viognier
- Other products: Olive oil
- Other attractions: eco-luxe accommodation,
- Website: http://www.mountavoca.com.au/

Mount Avoca Vineyard is an organic vineyard and five red star rated winery located in the Pyrenees Wine Region of Victoria, Australia near the town of Avoca producing high quality Australian wine for both the domestic and international markets. Established by John and Arda Barry in 1970 it is now owned by Matthew Barry. The property covers 160 Ha (400 acres) which comprises vineyard (24Ha), olive grove, winery and other buildings, grazing land, water storage and accommodation. Forty hectares (25% of the property or 100 acres) has been allocated to a conservation zone for bush-walking and mountain biking. Accommodation includes the 4 star rated Eco-Luxe lodges and the winery has been host to various events including road and mountain bike races, car rallies and musical concerts, it was also awarded 2011 Sustainable Winery of the Year.

== History ==
The original vineyard was planted in 1970 (4 acres of Shiraz and 4 acres of Trebbiano) with additional plantings of Shiraz in 1971 and Cabernet Sauvignon in 1972. Later plantings of Sauvignon blanc in 1982, Chardonnay in 1984 have been supplemented by plantings and grafting to other varieties including Merlot, Cabernet Franc, Tempranillo, Lagrein, Semillon and Viognier bringing the total area under vine to 24 Ha (60 acres). The family homestead was built in 1971 from hand made bricks recovered from an old bank demolished in nearby Maryborough. The Homestead was available as a holiday rental for several years but is now home to the General Manager / winemaker. The first vintage was 1976, made outdoors in stainless steel milk vats and some wine made at Seppelts Great Western Vineyard in 1977, the winery was built in 1978 which was the beginning of Mount Avoca as a fully integrated commercial winery. Sold in 2001 to the Barrington group, it was bought back by Matthew Barry in 2003. Ongoing capital works increased crushing capacity and the construction of three lodges added the Eco-Luxe accommodation to the business in 2011.

== Organic certification ==
The vineyard achieved organic certification in 2014 with Australian Certified Organic (ACO). The 2016 vintage includes the first wines to be fully certified.
