= Ordinance 17 Victoria Number 7 =

Ordinance 17 Victoria Number 7, entitled Ordinance for the Suppression of Violent Crimes Committed by Convicts Illegally at Large, was an ordinance that permitted capital punishment for escaped convicts who committed violent crimes while on the run in Western Australia. It was given royal assent in May 1854, and not repealed until 1903. Designed to protect free settlers from violent crimes by escaped convicts, the ordinance permitted capital punishment for offences much less serious than the usual capital crimes of murder, rape and assault with intent to murder.

Ordinance 17 Victoria Number 7 was only invoked three times in the Convict era of Western Australia. In one case, a sentence of death was not passed; and in another, a sentence of death was passed but the sentenced men were reprieved by the governor. The only occasion on which a sentence of death secured using the ordinance was carried out was in the trial of Robert Palin, who was hanged for robbery with violence.

== General references ==
- Bentley, Mollie (1983). "The Unwanted". In Erickson, Rica (ed.). The Brand on his Coat: Biographies of some Western Australian Convicts. Nedlands: UWA Publishing. pp. 157–223. ISBN 0-85564-223-8. LCCN 84145691. OCLC 12051617. OL 2914148M. Wikidata Q133820754.
