= Robert Palin =

Convict transported to Western Australia and executed in 1861

Robert Thomas Palin (c. 1835 – 6 July 1861) was a convict transported to Western Australia. His execution in 1861 was the only time in the convict era of Western Australia that Ordinance 17 Victoria Number 7 was used to secure the capital punishment of a convict for a crime not normally punishable by death.

Born around 1835, nothing is known of Robert Palin's early life except his criminal record. In 1851, he was sentenced to ten years' imprisonment for housebreaking; in 1853, he was tried but acquitted of murder; and in March 1856, he was convicted of "burglary from the person" and sentenced to penal servitude for life. At the time of his sentencing, he was described as a shoemaker by trade.

Palin was transported to Western Australia on Nile, arriving in January 1860. His behaviour was good both during and after the voyage. In April 1860, he was appointed a probationary constable and received his ticket of leave in January 1861. At that time he had a house in Fremantle from which he worked as a shoemaker and took in lodgers.

On 29 May 1861, Palin was charged with having broken into the home of Samuel and Susan Harding. Susan Harding gave evidence that her husband had been away and that she had woken during the night to find a man standing at the side of her bed. The man seized her by the arm and demanded money. When she said she had none,

he pulled the bedclothes down and felt about the bed ... I thought he was going to commit some assault.

Harding then gave the man a number of valuables and he left. The following morning, the police followed a set of footprints to Palin's house, where they found some wet boots whose tread matched the prints. They also recovered a number of the valuables that had been stolen.

Palin claimed to have been set up by William Cockrane, another ticket-of-leave man whom Palin said had a grudge against him. However, he was not believed and the jury found him guilty of robbery with violence, the violence being the "battery on the person of Mrs. Harding by seizing her by the arm while she was in bed." Chief Justice Archibald Burt passed a sentence of death and Palin was hanged three days later on 6 July 1861.
