= Elizabeth Tripp =

Australian educator (1809–1899)

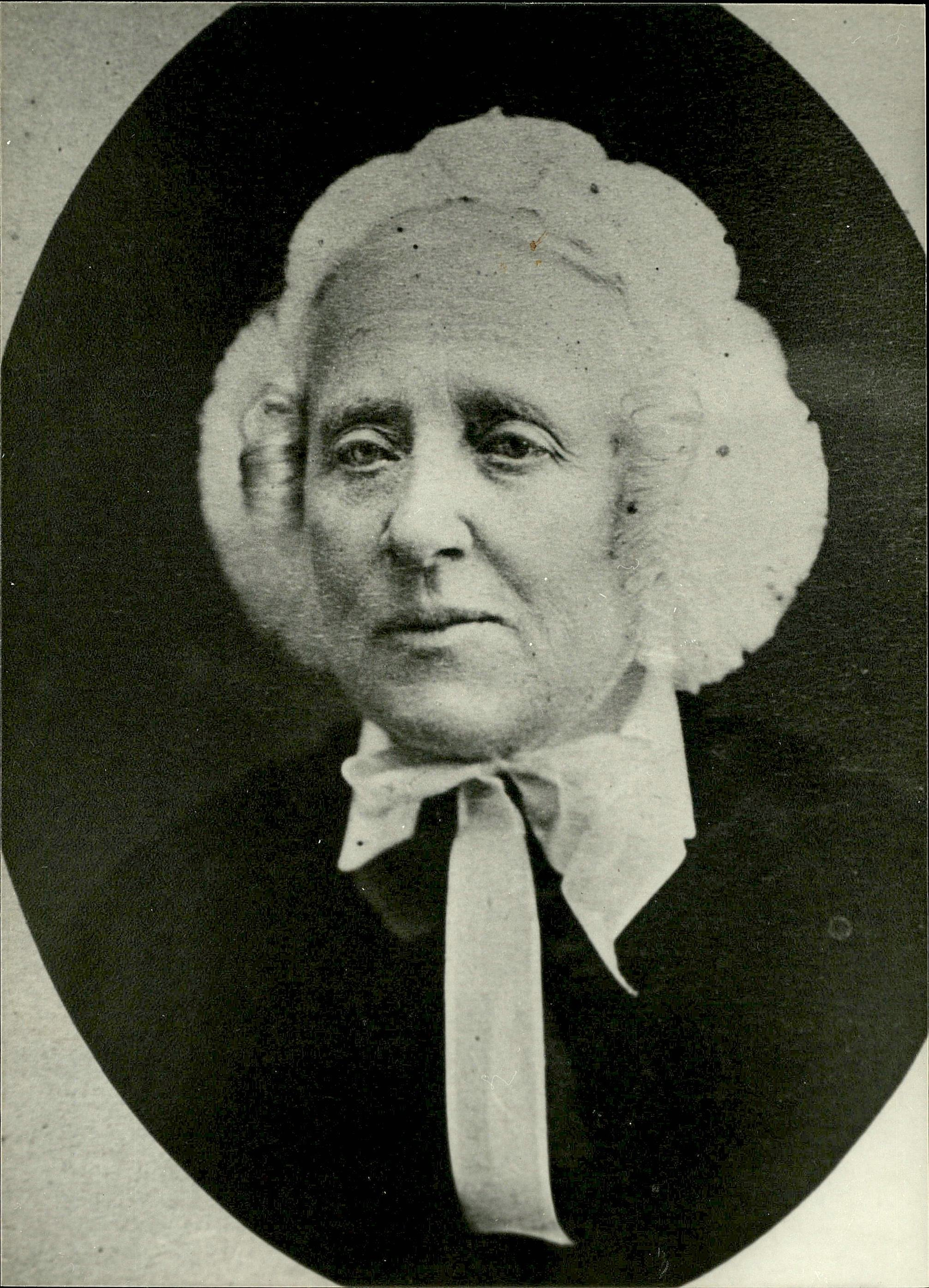
- Tripp c.1860
- Born: Elizabeth Leigh; 1809; Devonshire, England
- Died: 25 September 1899 (aged 89–90); Toorak, Victoria, Australia
- Occupations: Educator; Businessperson
- Known for: Founding East Leigh Ladies College
- Board member of: Inaugural Honorary Secretary of the Royal Women's Hospital

Elizabeth Tripp (born Elizabeth Leigh, 1809 – 25 September 1899) was an Australian educator. She was the founder and manager of one of the first lasting schools for girls in Melbourne the East Leigh in Melbourne, between 1859 and 1881. She was the inaugural honorary secretary of the Royal Women's Hospital.

== Biography ==
=== Early life ===
Tripp was born to the jurist William Leigh in Devonshire in England. In 1831, she married her cousin, the lawyer William Upton Tripp (d. 1873), with whom she had five daughters and a son. She emigrated to Australia with her family in 1850.

=== Career ===
In 1859, she separated from her spouse, and opened a school for girls in Melbourne with the help of her daughters. From the 1850s onward, it was common for an educated woman in Melbourne to open a school for girls, but normally, these schools were only a temporary method for self-support: the East Leigh was the first girls school in Melbourne to become a successful and permanent educational institution and was as such a pioneer institution. First only assisted by her daughters, Tripp was soon able to engage professional teachers.

Tripp lived at the East Leigh seminary school with her daughters Margaret Oliver Tripp, and Frances Anne Ridgeway. The school, which had previously been located at South Yarra, had moved to Williams Road Toorak some time about 1865-1866. In 1876, a teacher from Toorak College, William Gordon, had been found on the property of the seminary, trying to break in on two occasions. On the second time, Tripp went out to confront him, and seized him. He hit her in the face. Margaret hit him on the head with a stick. and the women, along with a nurse restrained him until help arrived. Gordon was charged and sentenced to 15 months hard labour for trespassing and assault. However he was released a month later when he appealed on error in the warrant paperwork which had not been filled out correctly.

By the late 1880s, East Leigh had new management and was being run by a Mrs Baynes, and her daughters.

Tripp's daughter Margaret opened her own school at her house on Washington street in Toorak in 1892. Then in 1895, she acquired the grounds of Toorak College which had previously been a boys school, and reopened it as a girls' school.

Tripp was the first Honorary Secretary on the management committee of the Royal Women's Hospital when it opened in August 1856.

Tripp was also a successful businessperson within the stock market.

=== Death ===
Tripp died at her home, 12 Bruce Street, Toorak, on 25 September 1899. Her funeral was held at St. John's Church, Toorak, with burial at the Melbourne General Cemetery.

== Archive ==
The State Library of Victoria holds Elizabeth Tripp's memoirs in its Manuscripts collection. Bridget Thurgate (née Tripp) transcribed them in 1997.
