= St Mary Star of the Sea, West Melbourne =

St Mary Star of the Sea
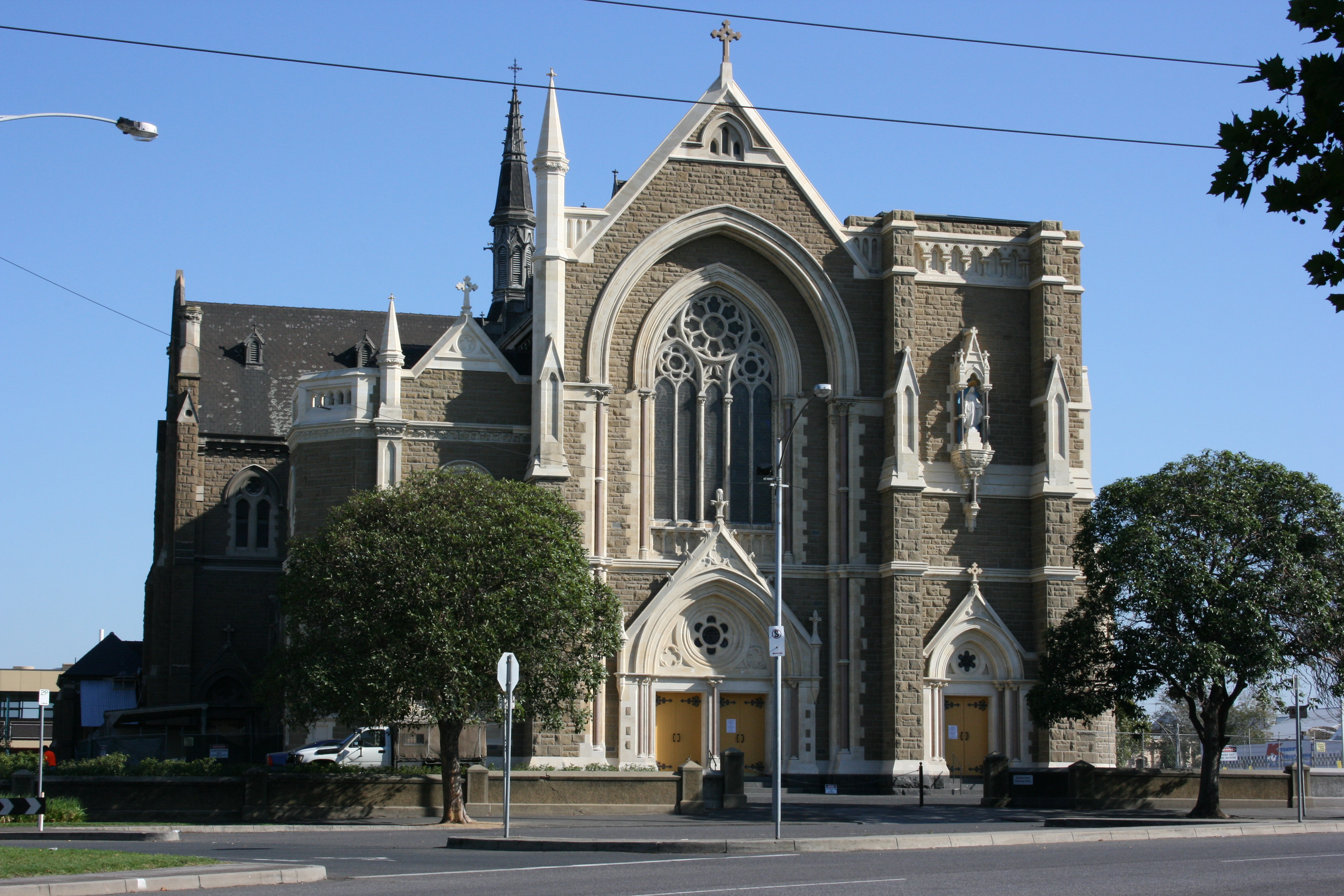
- St Mary Star of the Sea, from Howard Street
- St Mary Star of the Sea
- 37°48′22″S 144°57′11″E
- Location: 235-273 Victoria Street, West Melbourne, Victoria
- Country: Australia
- Denomination: Roman Catholic
- Religious institute: Opus Dei
- Website: stmaryswestmelbourne.org

History
- Status: Church
- Founded: June 1892
- Dedication: Our Lady, Star of the Sea
- Dedicated: 18 February 1900 by Cardinal Patrick Francis Moran
- Consecrated: 12 February 1925 by Archbishop Bartolomeo Cattaneo, Apostolic Nuncio

Architecture
- Functional status: Active
- Architects: Edgar J. Henderson; Phillip Kennedy
- Architectural type: Church
- Style: Gothic Revival
- Years built: 1892 – 1925

Specifications
- Length: 53 metres (175 ft)
- Width: 29 metres (96 ft)
- Materials: Brick, stone, slate

Administration
- Archdiocese: Melbourne
- Parish: St Mary's Star of the Sea

Clergy
- Priest: Fr Andrew Paris

Victorian Heritage Register
- Official name: St May Star of the Sea Church Complex
- Type: State heritage (Monuments and Memorials, Religion)
- Designated: 11 December 2008
- Reference no.: 1276

St Mary Star of the Sea is a Roman Catholic parish church in West Melbourne, Victoria, Australia. The foundation stone of the church was laid in 1882 and the building was completed by 1900. Since 2002, restoration has been ongoing to restore the church to its original state. The Church has seating for 400, it has been described as the largest parish church in Melbourne, in Victoria, or even in Australia.

The church was listed on the Victorian Heritage Register on 11 December 2008.

== History ==
=== Origins of the site ===
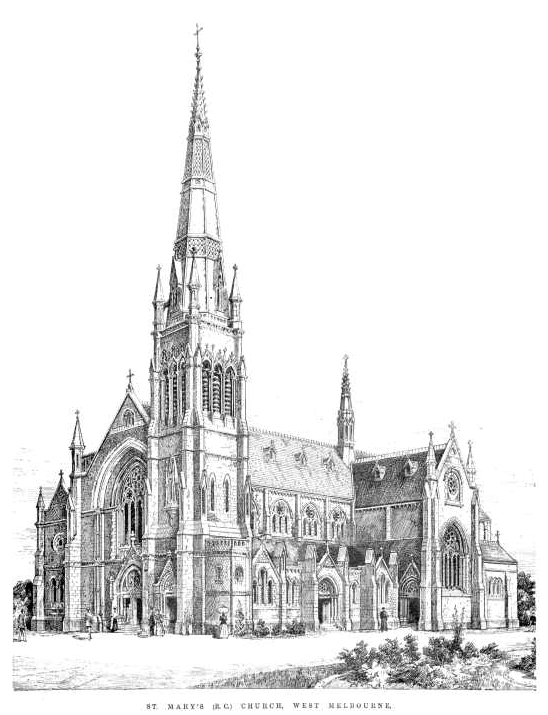
Artist's conception of the completed Church. The Fitzgerald Tower was never completed

On 30 September 1852, only a few weeks after land allotments in North Melbourne became available, the Very Rev Patrick Geoghegan OSF, Melbourne's first vicar general, secured 8,100 square metres (2 acres), on the highest point within the block formed by Victoria, William and Chetwynd streets. A foundation stone was laid two years later, on 14 May 1854, and within six months a modest cruciform stone church was erected. Melbourne's port lay in the church's shadow, and so the church was dedicated to Our Lady, Star of the Sea, patroness of seafarers. Priests from St Francis', Melbourne's proto-cathedral, served the mission.

The Victorian Gold Rush fuelled a population explosion which contributed to a rapidly increasing Catholic congregation. On 28 July 1862, the Rev Simon Riordan chaired a public meeting which resolved to erect an entirely new church to serve North and West Melbourne. A scarcity of funds forced an alternative: two additional transepts should be added to the existing building. Construction was delayed, however, by a good nine years. In 1871, a new transept increased the capacity of the church to 500.

Two years later, in 1873, St Mary Star of the Sea became a parish. The Rev Henry England, West Melbourne's long-standing locum priest, was appointed first parish priest. In 1875, Archbishop James Alipius Goold visited the parish and informed the priest and parishioners that the building was not adequate for divine worship. In response, a second transept was added and the interior renovated.

In 1881, plans for a new and larger church, by prolific architects Tappin, Gilbert and Dennehy, were announced. Archbishop Goold laid the foundation stone on 9 December 1883, but the death of Dean England, and a shortage of funds, halted construction. The Rev Patrick Joseph Aylward was appointed parish priest in 1889, and he immediately terminated the project. The proposed building was too small for the rapidly increasing Catholic population.

=== Building of the current church ===
The foundations of the current church were laid in June 1892. A young and as yet unknown architect, Edgar J. Henderson, tendered plans for a grandiose sandstone cruciform in the French Gothic style. At 53 metres (175 ft) long and 29 metres (94 ft) wide, the proposed church was criticised by Archbishop Thomas Joseph Carr for being too large, but parishioners embraced the ambitious project. Within a year, however, economic depression had wrought havoc on the project's finance. Remarkably, in the face of devastating poverty, parishioners managed to fund ongoing construction, and church was built in eight years.

Phillip Kennedy took over Henderson's architectural role, and the contrast between the church's exterior and interior can be attributed to his influence. Henderson's rose windows, battered plinths, cylindrical turrets, and soaring groined timber ceiling exemplify the French Gothic Revival. Kennedy's glossy marble and granite pillars, intricate marble fittings, and pink tinted walls, however, betray an Italianate influence.

On 18 February 1900, Cardinal Patrick Francis Moran opened and blessed the new church to great fanfare before an assembly of 1,400. Local Catholic newspaper The Advocate remarked that "The congregation has literally emerged from the worst ecclesiastical building in the colony to enter one of the finest."

The church was finally completed in 1925. On 12 February, Archbishop Bartolomeo Cattaneo, the apostolic delegate, dedicated the new marble high altar and consecrated the completed church.

=== History of the parish ===
In its embryonic years, St Mary's was an overwhelming Irish Australian parish. In the years of the Gold Rush, however, a significant number of Chinese Australians also worshipped there.

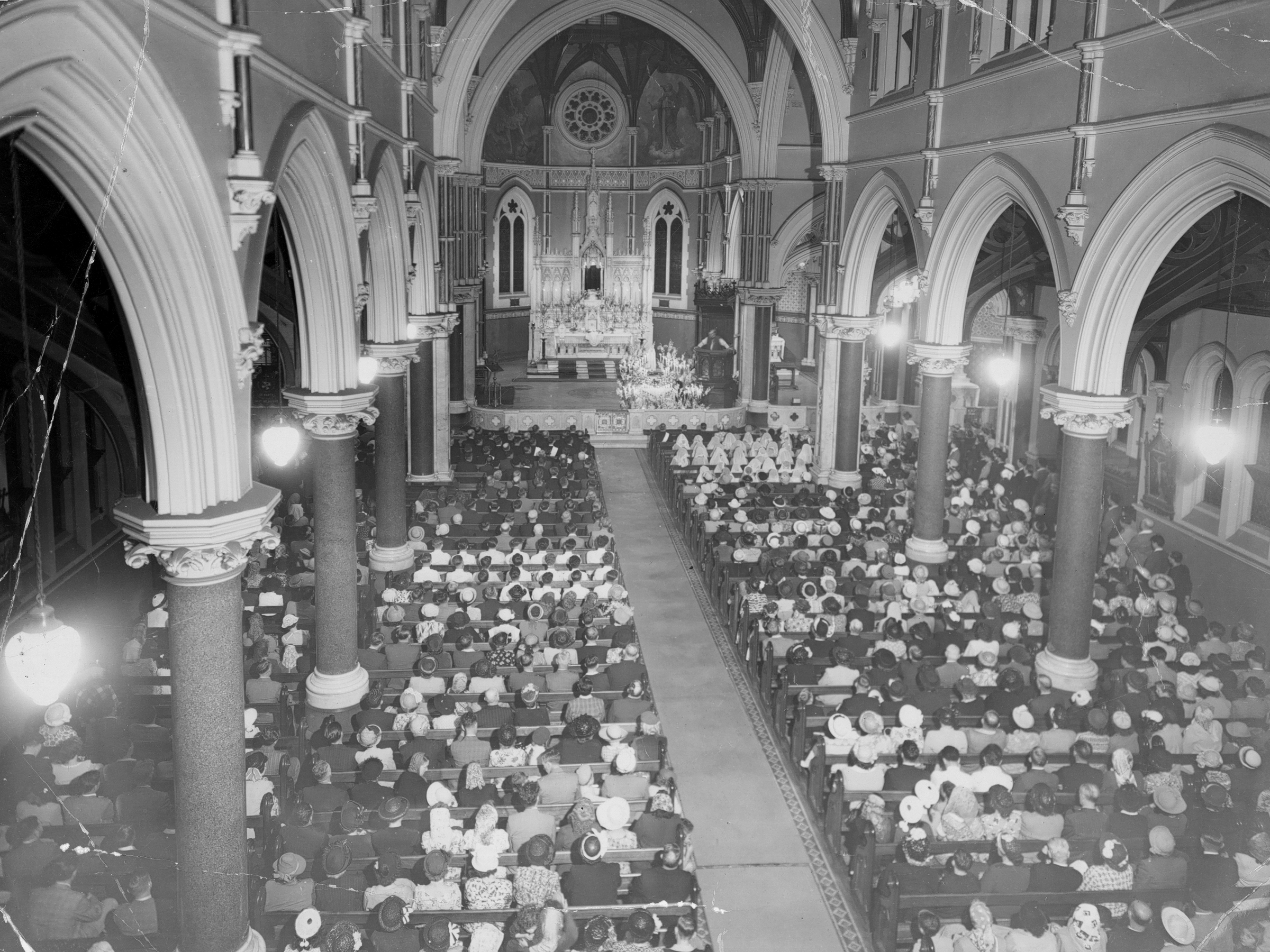
An early photograph of a Mass at St Mary's

The graves of many of St Mary's early parishioners still lie beneath the Queen Victoria Market a few hundred metres eastward.

Post war immigration to Australia transformed St Mary's congregation. Italian and Maltese Australians embellished popular devotion and worship. In more recent years Lithuanian and Vietnamese Australians have also contributed to the life of the parish.

Daniel Mannix, as coadjutor bishop to Archbishop Carr, resided at St Mary's and served as parish priest of West Melbourne from 1913 until 1917. While serving as parish priest he effectively led the campaign against Australians being conscripted to fight in the World War then raging overseas. Once archbishop he would reign as such to nearly the completion of his hundredth year. His own coadjutor, Justin Simonds, similarly resided there and served as parish priest for 21 years from 1942 to 1963. Upon Simonds' succession to the See of Melbourne in 1963, Melbourne auxiliary bishop Arthur Fox served as parish priest of West Melbourne until his appointment to the See of Sale in 1967.

In 2001, Archbishop George Pell entrusted the parish to the priests of Opus Dei, a personal prelature of the Catholic Church.

== Restoration ==
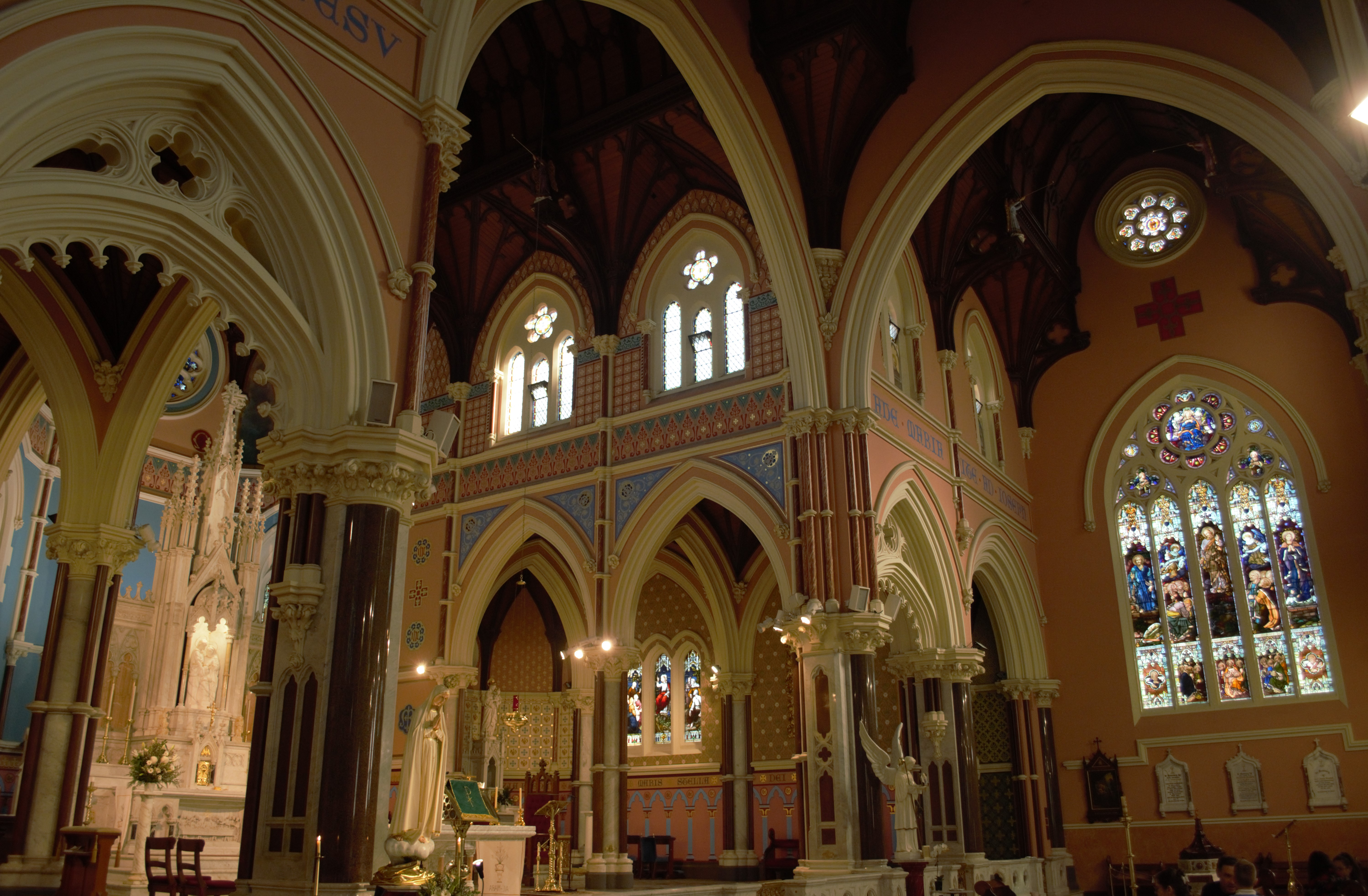
Chancel arch

=== Need for restoration ===
The Depression of the 1890s had restricted the original building budget. Much of the Victorian sandstone and New Zealand limestone used was low-grade, and this severely deteriorated over the next century. The delicate blue and gold stencilling and marble rose colours of the church interior also deteriorated over time, so in the late 1950s, these extraordinary colour schemes were painted over.

Starting in the 1960s, West Melbourne became more and more commercialised and industrialised. The decrease of residents translated into a decrease of parishioners, which in turn greatly restricted funds and prohibited costly maintenance of the church's sandstone exterior and slate roof. For the same financial reasons, St Mary's did not undergo the renovations which occurred in so many Catholic churches in the wake of the Second Vatican Council. The communion rails were preserved, and the forward altar was only a temporary wooden structure.

It was not long before deterioration of the limestone exterior of St Mary's set in. It was also difficult to maintain the highly decorative interior. The complex stencilling of the sanctuary and side chapels was lost in the 1960s to a monotone covering of paint. By the nineties much of the external fabric was dangerously fragile and there were a few near accidents. It was difficult to know what to do, as the congregation had now shrunk to a small number of faithful in an area of the city that was largely made up of commercial outlets and small industry. By the turn of the century, the external fabric of St Mary's was in a very bad state. Its interior was gloomy and in a state of synthetic disrepair.

=== Description of the restoration ===
In 2002 the parish priest, the Rev Joseph Martins, launched a A$10 million restoration project. Elias Jreissati AM, a notable Melbourne businessman was appointed by the Melbourne Catholic archdiocese as Chairman of the appeal. Thomas Hazell AO, an experienced public servant and committed restorationist, acting as Deputy Chairman, headed the restoration project. Dennis Payne, the chief architect, led a specialist team widely recognised for expertise in heritage buildings and places of worship. George Giannis, the chief restorer, set about not only restoring past grandeur, but added details which were envisaged but never realised in the initial construction.

Faithful restoration, by way of example, includes the recreation of gold stencil work in the sanctuary. Some of the stencils relate directly to Eugène Viollet-le-Duc's restorations at the Cathedral of Notre-Dame de Paris, whilst others derive from Augustus Pugin's designs for the Houses of Parliament at Westminster. Giannis' team has also recovered the original brilliance of the magnificent images of St Gabriel and St Michael which overlook the high altar. But he has also painted and fixed a depiction of Christ Pantocrator, which was intended to adorn the arch separating the nave and chancel. Similarly, fibre-glass angels now stand in the niches high in the church ceiling, in place of carved timber angels which were planned in the 1890s, but never commissioned.

To enable Mass to be offered by the priest facing the congregation, construction of a permanent marble altar coram populum accompanied the restoration project. The altar was designed by the Rev Victor Martinez, a professional architect and priest of Opus Dei. Its constituent two tonnes of marble required extra reinforcement to the crypt beneath the sanctuary. The restoration of the interior is largely complete.

Several trade unions and building suppliers very generously donated labour and equipment. Most of the sum raised for the restoration financed the replacement of the decayed sand and limestone of the external walls. Over 250 tonnes of replacement stone was used on the north and east facades. Exterior work on the west and south facades is still outstanding. The 2008 financial crisis impacted fund-raising, and work ground to a halt.

The site is listed on the Victorian Heritage Register.

== Description of the church ==
=== Church exterior ===
The church is traditional in form, consisting of a tall gable-roofed nave, a crossing and intersecting transepts, with a hipped polygonal apse at the western end. The nave is flanked by a pair of skillion-roofed aisles, which, being at a considerably lower level, allow for clerestory windows to the upper portion of the nave.

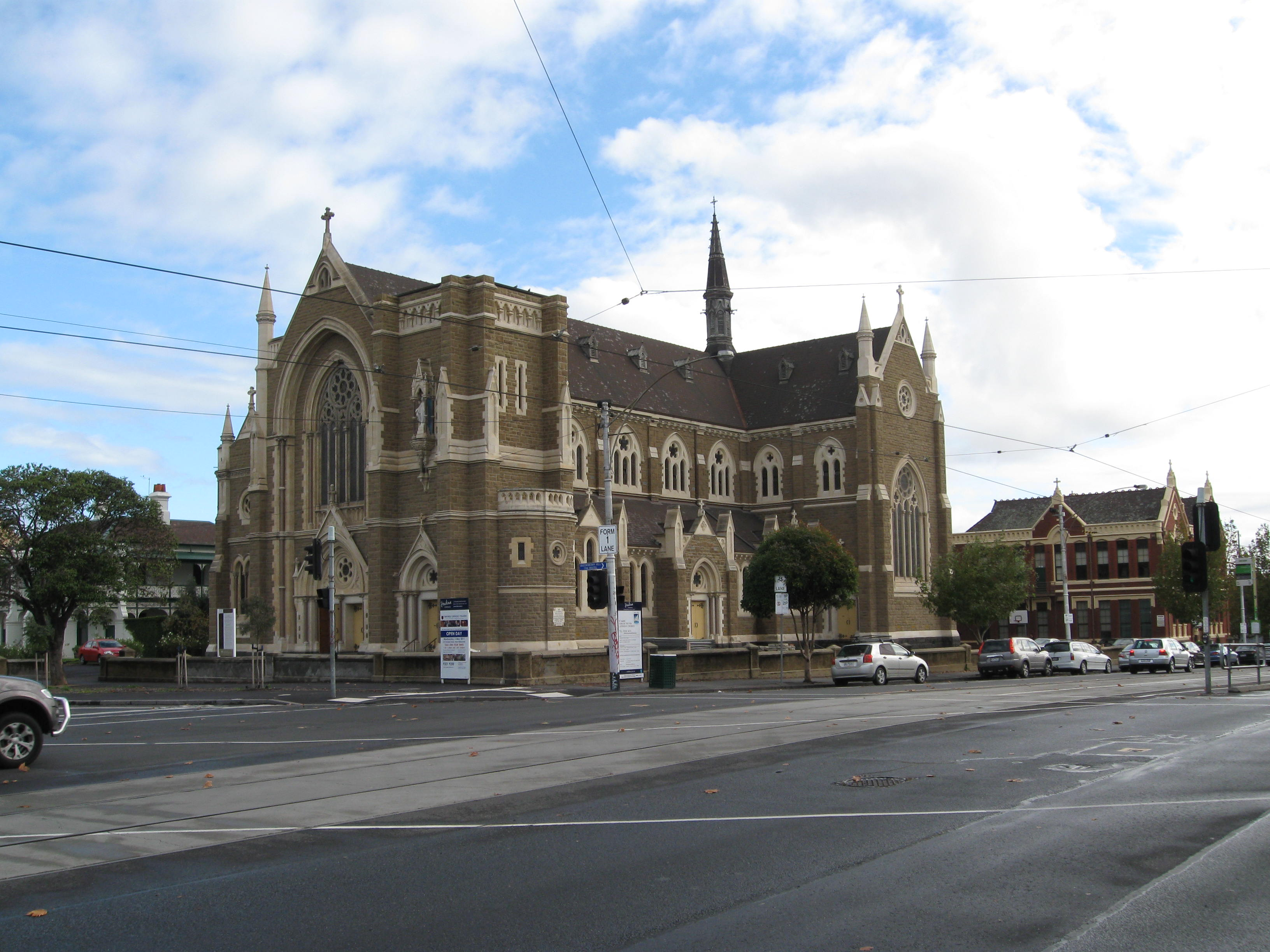
The exterior of St Mary's. Notice the uncompleted tower.

In the north-eastern corner, the incomplete stump of the tower forms a dominant vertical element. A number of smaller-proposed semi-detached single-storey elements project from the main bulk of the church: two pairs of chapels flanking the apse, the cluster of hip-roofed sacristies in the south-western corner, and the former baptistery in the south-eastern corner.

The church itself is of brick construction, with an external stone facing. It has a plinth of rock-faced Malmesbury bluestone, which is surmounted by a course of splayed blocks of Mount Somers limestone. Above this is the facing of Barrabool Hills sandstone. Two types of limestone, both of New Zealand origin, have been used for the external dressings: Mount Somers limestone for the plinth course, doorjambs and window tracery, and Oamaru limestone for all other dressings. The colonettes, flanking the window and door openings, are of polished Aberdeen (red) granite.

The roof of the church is clad in Westmorland slate, with 'tile ridging'. Westmorland slate is of English origin; it has a tendency to be green in colour, in contrast to the blue-coloured slate from Wales. The slates are doubled-nailed with copper nails. The original 'tile ridging' was replaced in 1941. At the crossing of the roof is a flêche, substantially of pressed zinc on timber framing. This is in the form of a polygonal shaft with eight trefoil-arched openings, containing louvred vents, surmounted by a tapering conical spire, clad partly with rounded slate, and partly with flat sheet zinc. The flêche is further embellished with a row of projecting decorative elements at the base of the spire, and a Latin cross, once gilded, at the apex.

The Fitzgerald Tower, as it was named in the 1890s, remains incomplete. It was originally to be 162 feet (about fifty metres) tall, to the tip of the spire. The tower, presently consisting of the equivalent of only two storeys, is square in plan, with intersecting buttresses at each corner. The first floor level (approximately in line with the roof of the aisle) is articulated by a course of splayed limestone blocks, and the upper level by an arcaded limestone frieze, consisting of a row of trefoil arches supported on squat columns with cushion capitals.

=== Church interior ===
==== Main portion of the church ====
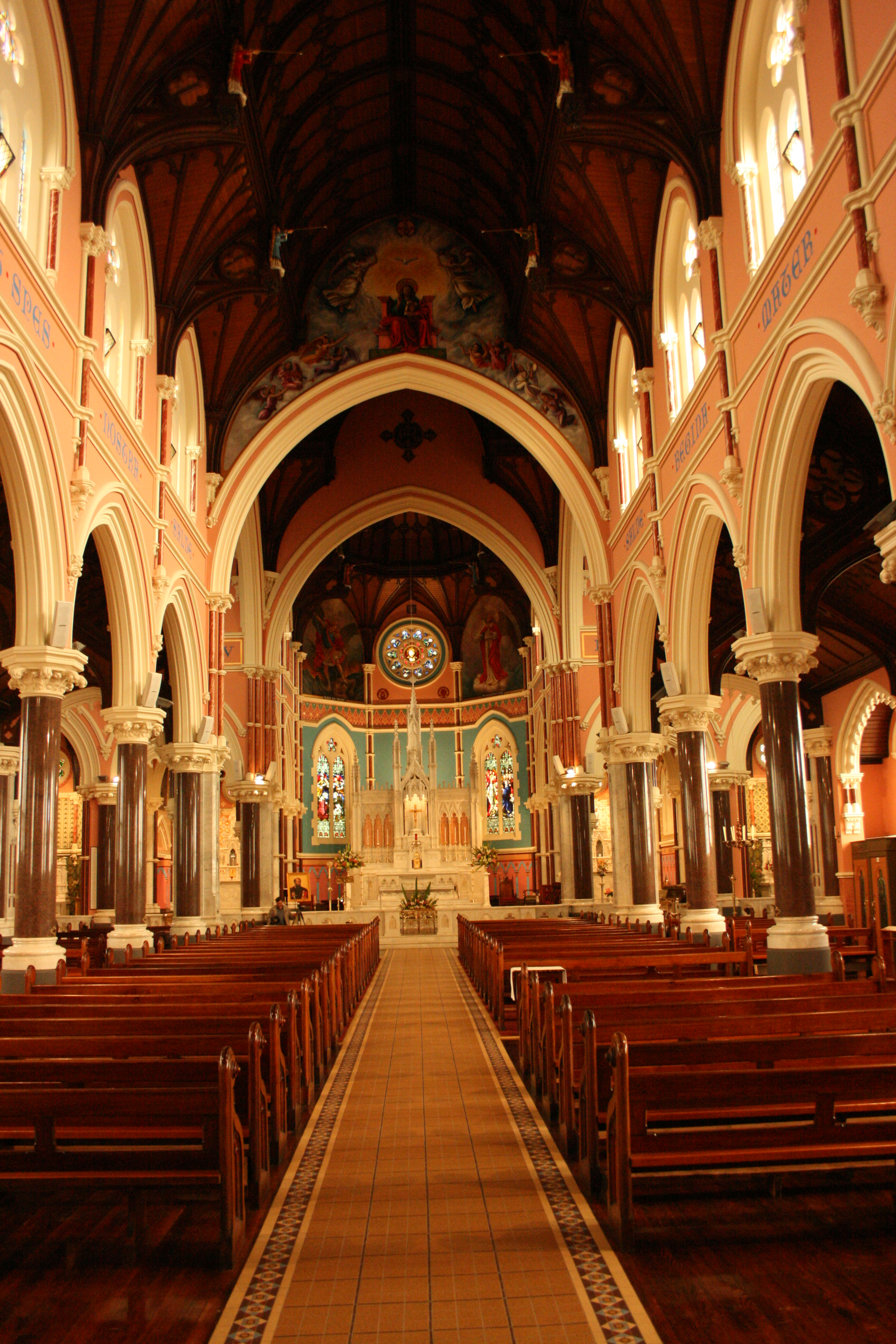
The interior of St Mary's

The church is planned on the traditional Latin cross form. The total interior length, from east to west, is 53 metres (175 ft) long, or, as described in a contemporary source: 'nearly three chains, or three times the width of Bourke Street'. The church is 29 metres (96 ft) wide, from transept to transept, or 'being five feet narrower than Elizabeth Street, from shop window to shop window'. The bulk of the east–west portion of the church is 21 metres (68 ft) wide, and comprises a nave, flanked by two aisles and three pairs of projecting alcoves, three of which are used as confessionals. At the east end of the nave is the organ gallery, accessed via a staircase in the northeast corner. In the corresponding south-eastern corner is the original baptistery, now used as a Chapel of Saint Josemaría.

The main portion of the church is divided into five bays, with arcades separating the nave and the flanking aisles. Each arcade is supported on six Jork Swedish red granite columns, worked and polished in Scotland. These columns are arranged so as not to intercept the view of the high altar from the aisles. The columns have capitals of foliated form artistically treated so as to appear alike, but the detail of each differs materially. The columns have marble bases, which, in turn, are supported on smoothly rutted Malmsbury bluestone plinths. The columns each bear a polished brass plate at the base of the shaft, inscribed with the name of the parishioner or the parish organization who funded the cost of that column.

==== Sanctuary and chapels ====
St Mary's contains four side chapels in addition to the main altar. The sanctuary is flanked by a pair of chapels, dedicated to the Sacred Heart (south) and the Blessed Virgin Mary (north). Flanking these large chapels are two smaller chapels, which front the transepts, dedicated to Saints of Ireland (south) and Saint Joseph (north). All four chapels and the sanctuary, terminate in semi-octagonal forms.

The sanctuary and chapels are separated from the nave and transept by a white marble altar rail, installed in 1927, which is pierced by repetitive quatrefoils. The sanctuary and each of the chapels are accessed via separate openings with ornate brass gates. The canted walls of the sanctuary and chapels have clusters of columns and half columns at their intersections. Some marble inlay is of Pyrenean (Spanish) rose marble; other columns are scagliola. Scagliola, which dates back to the 17th century or earlier, is a form of plastering which imitates marble, or other fine stone. Scagliola columns are traditionally made by forming a substrate of thin strips of metal or wood which are lathed and covered with a coating of lime and hair. The columns are then coated with a mix of gypsum plaster and glue, tinted accordingly. The dense and highly polished finish is achieved by rubbing with pumice, charcoal, linen cloth and, finally, felt impregnated with oil.

The floor of the sanctuary and side chapels is covered with a marble mosaic pavement installed in 1927. The mosaic tiling comprises off-white tiles, set into a square grid of yellow tiles, with an ornate geometric and foliated border of black, grey and yellow tiles. The design incorporates a number of circular panels, including symbolic representations of a Pascal lamb (representing Christ), a sailing ship (representing the Star of the Sea), a Latin cross, a basket with loaves and fish (representing the Eucharist), and the monograms of the Sacred Heart and the Blessed Virgin Mary.

==== Organ ====
The colony's leading organ builder, George Fincham, worked on St Mary's organ from 1898 to 1900. It was the first pipe organ in Australia to be classified by the National Trust and is well regarded as an instrument of national importance. It is Australia's largest 19th-century organ still intact.

The majority of Fincham's larger organs have been greatly altered or destroyed. The only two substantial examples of his later work which survive largely intact are the instruments at St Joseph's Parish in Warrnambool (1892) and at St Mary's, restored in 1993.

While building St Mary's organ, in September 1899, Fincham suffered a paralytic stroke, from which he fully recovered. He admitted his son Leslie as a partner in the firm in 1900 which was henceforth known as George Fincham & Son. Fincham Sr continued to be actively involved as an organ builder until his death on 21 December 1910.

== Film ==
In 2000, the church was featured in The Wog Boy. In 2007, the church featured in Ghost Rider.

== Gallery ==
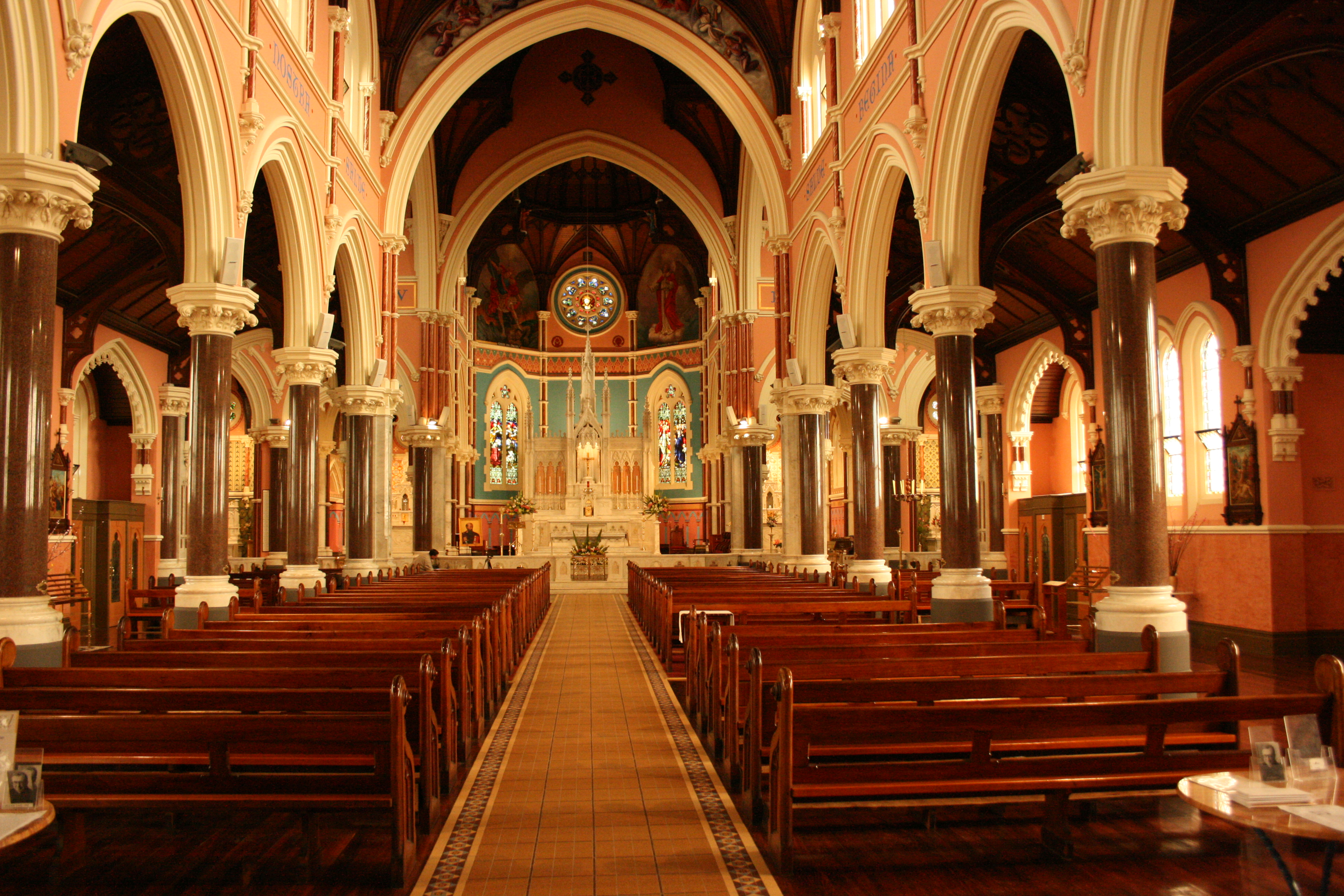
The Interior at St Mary's

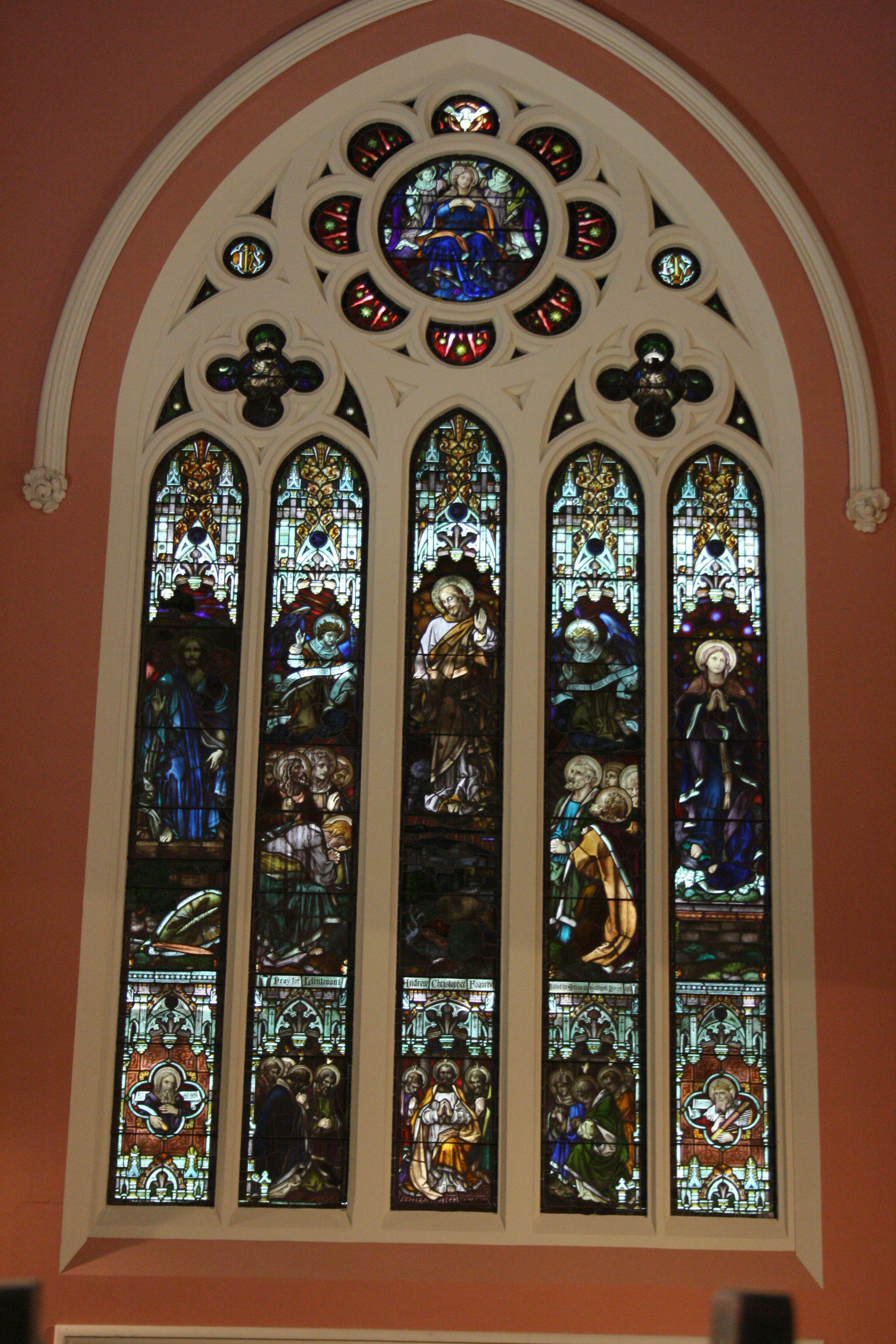
A stained glass windows at St Mary's

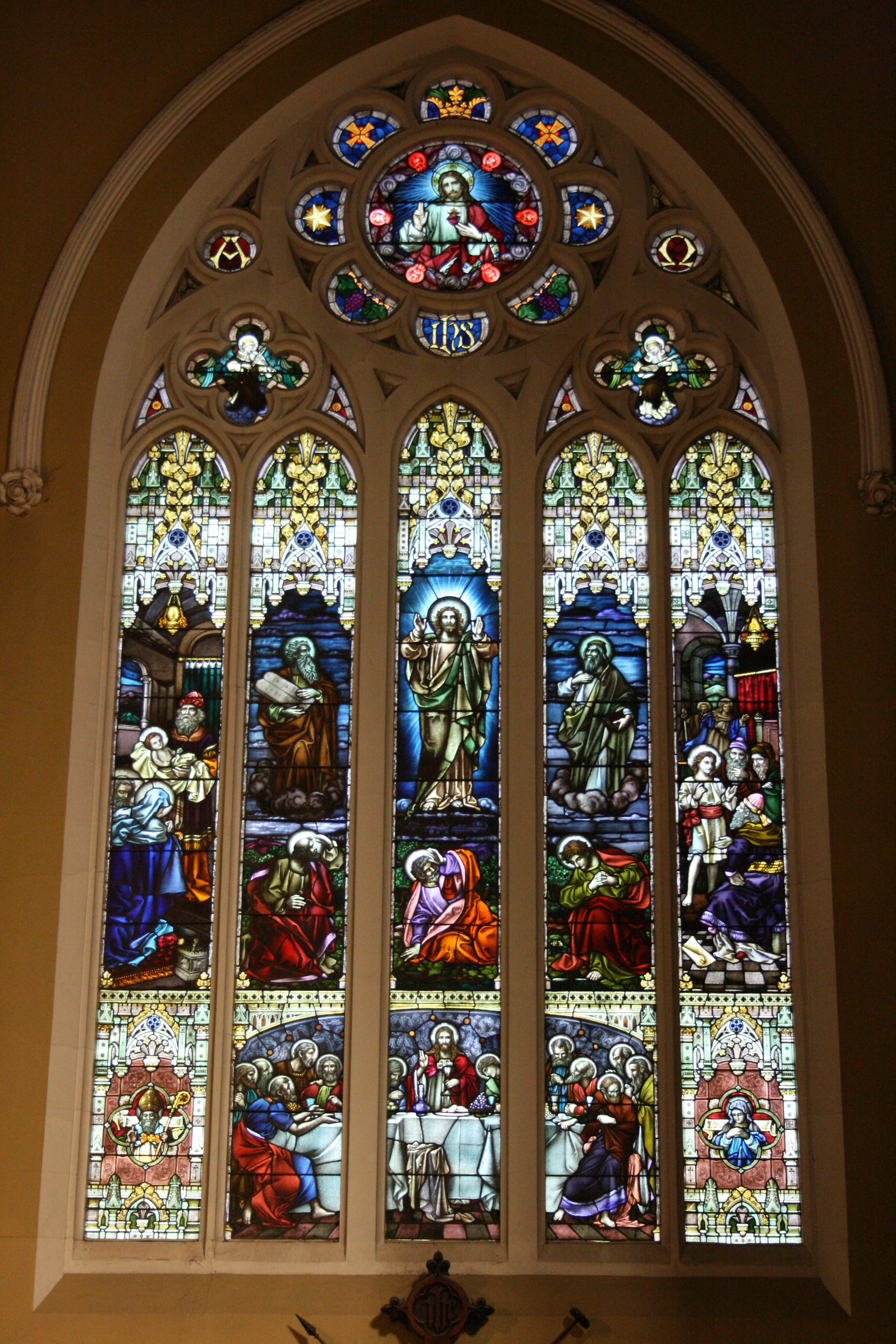
A stained glass windows at St Mary's

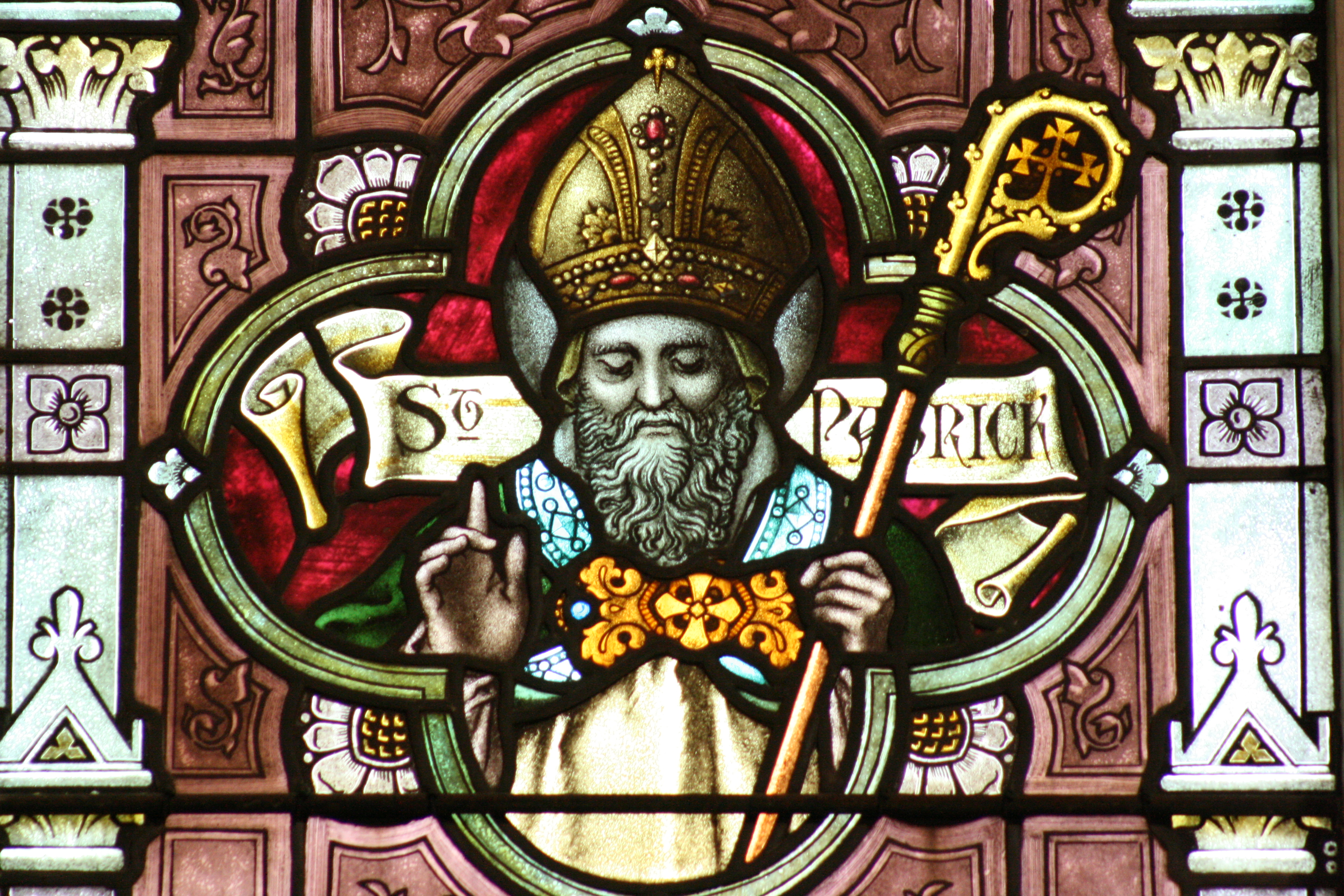
A close example of the stained glass windows

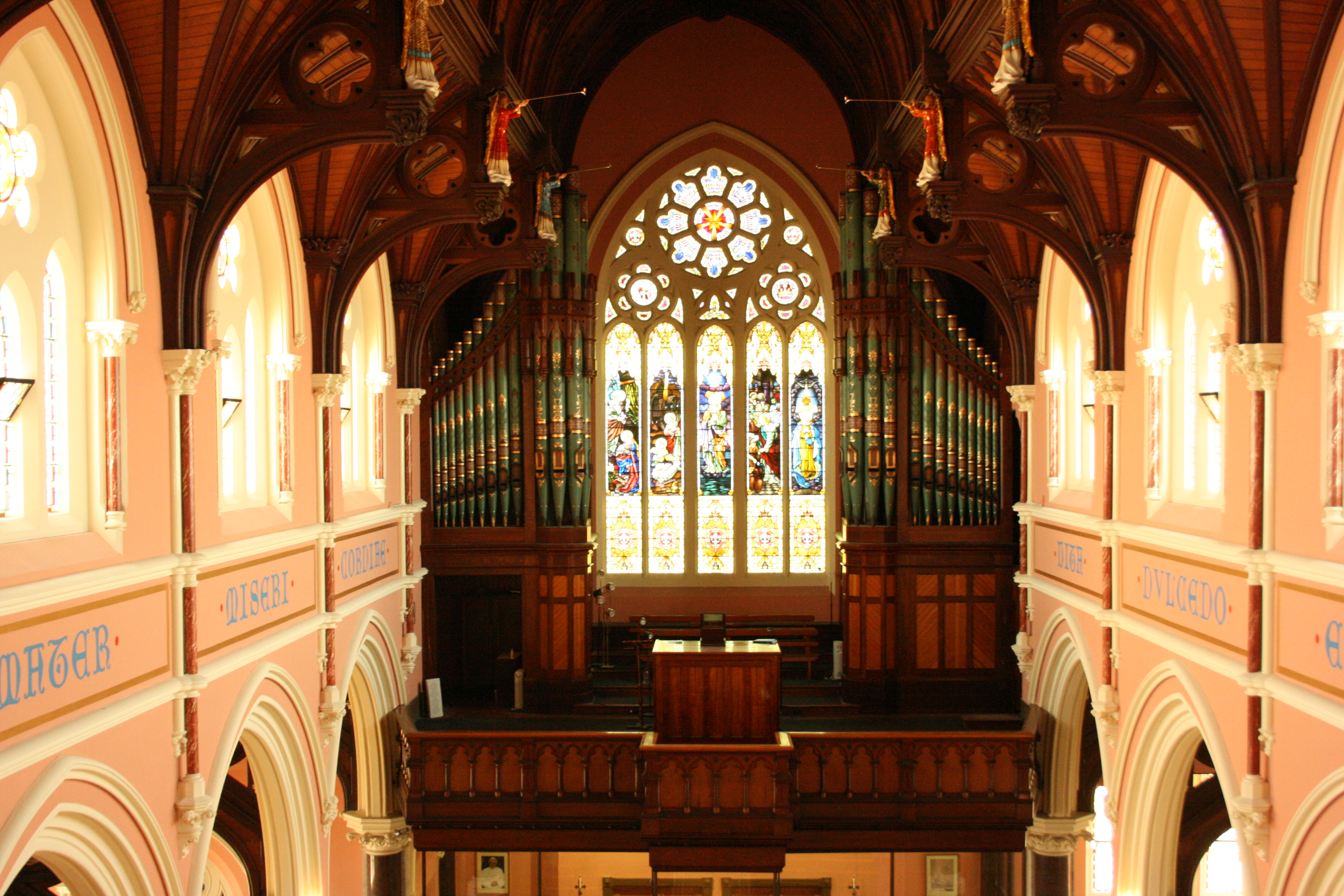
The organ at St Mary's

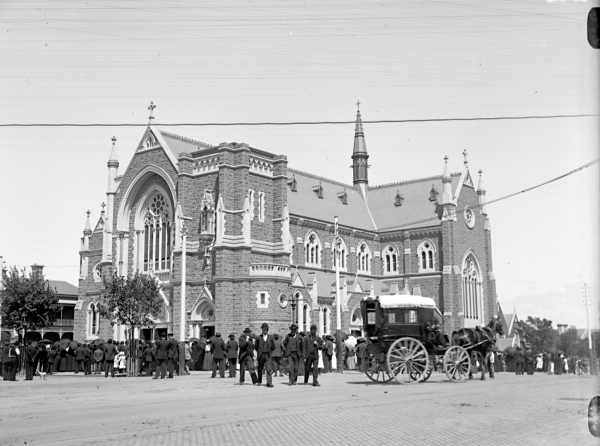
An older photograph of the church

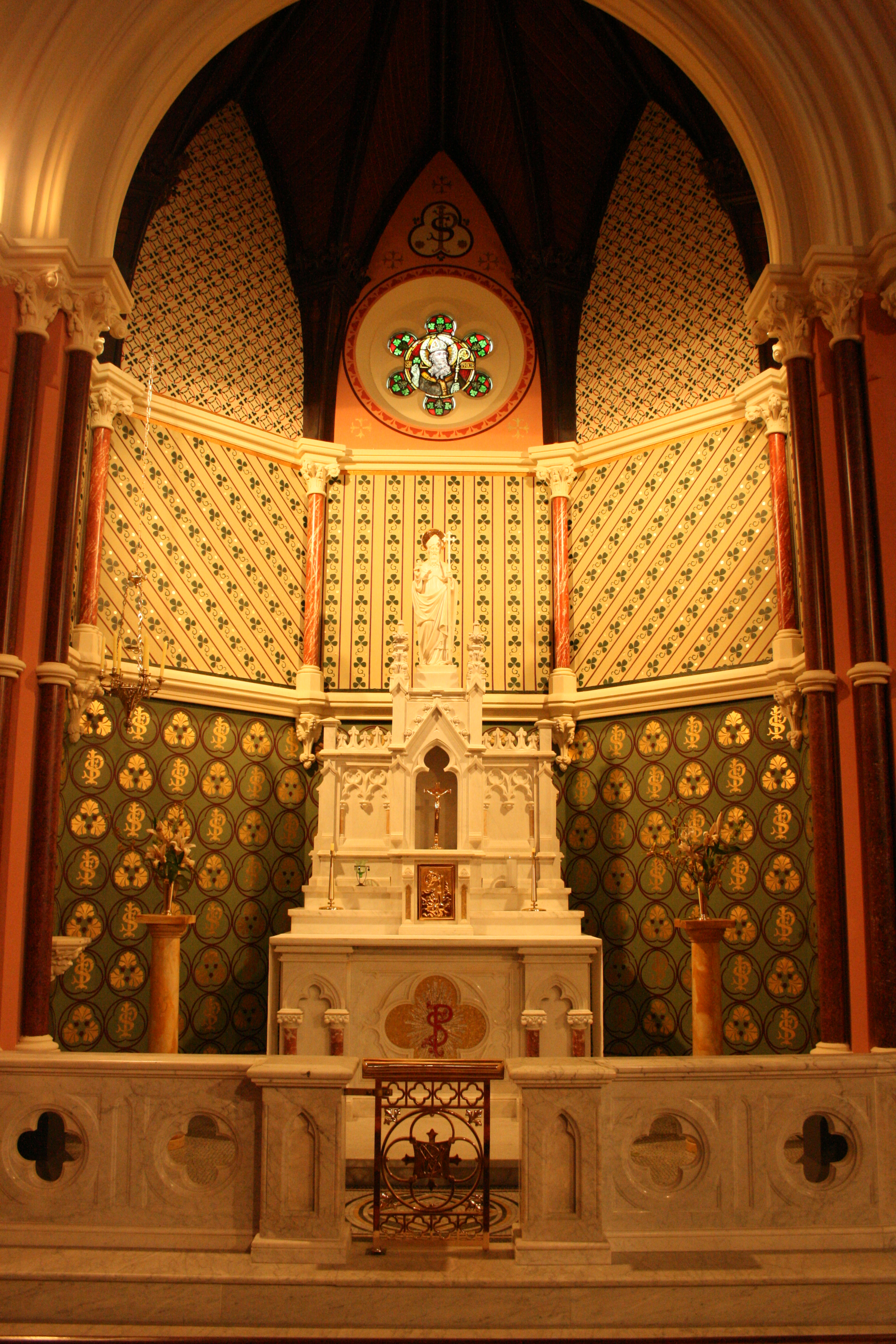
Chapel of the Irish Saints

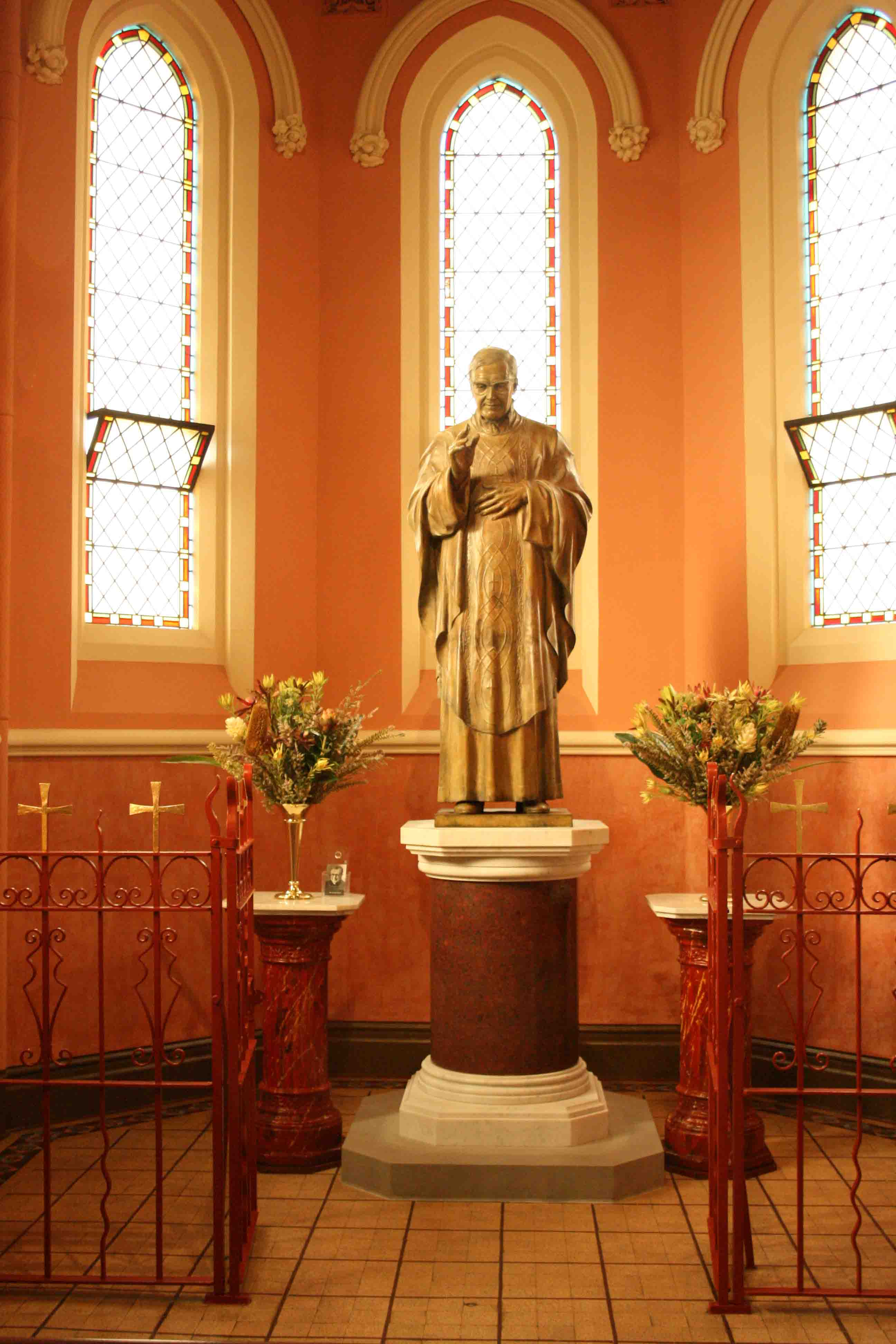
Statue of Josemaría Escrivá
