= Henry Young =

English colonial administrator (1803–1870)

Sir Henry Young KCMG
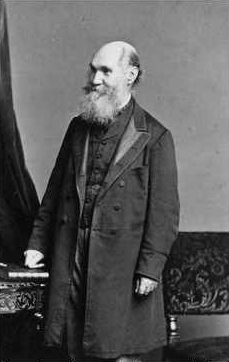

5th Governor of South Australia
- In office 4 August 1848 – 20 December 1854
- Monarch: Victoria
- Preceded by: Frederick Robe
- Succeeded by: Richard Graves MacDonnell

1st Governor of Tasmania
- In office 8 January 1855 – 10 December 1861
- Monarch: Victoria
- Succeeded by: Thomas Gore Browne

Personal details
- Born: 23 April 1803 Brabourne, Kent, England
- Died: 18 September 1870 (aged 67) London, England
- Spouse: Augusta Sophia Marryat
- Education: Inner Temple

Sir Henry Edward Fox Young, KCMG (23 April 1803 – 18 September 1870) was the fifth Governor of South Australia, serving in that role from 2 August 1848 until 20 December 1854. He was then the first Governor of Tasmania, from 1855 until 1861.

== Early life ==
Young was the third son of Sir Aretas William Young.

== Early career ==
Young was appointed in 1827 to a position in the colonial treasury in Trinidad, and in 1828 was transferred to Demerara, British Guiana. From 1833, he was involved in the emancipation of slaves in the British Caribbean colonies. In 1834, he was posted briefly to St Lucia as treasurer, secretary and member of the council, and in 1835 returned to British Guiana as government secretary.

In 1847, Young returned to London, before he was appointed lieutenant-governor of the Eastern District of the Cape Colony (later the Eastern Cape) in South Africa. He was knighted in 1847.

== Governor of South Australia ==
Young was transferred a few months later to South Australia where he arrived on 1 August 1848 on the Forfarshire. Under Young, South Australia received its first formal parliament. The lower house, the House of Assembly, comprised 36 members, each elected from a different area.

Governor Young, described as a man of zeal and foresightedness, found a lack of adequate transport was hampering the development of commerce, industry and agriculture. Since there was huge potential for transporting agricultural produce from Victoria and riverine New South Wales via the River Murray thence South Australian ports, in 1851 he offered a prize of £2000 for the first person to travel up the to its junction with the Darling River (now the town of Wentworth) in a paddle steamer. The prize was claimed in 1853 by Francis Cadell with his steamer Lady Augusta (named for Sir Henry's wife). Due to the difficulty of navigating the Murray Mouth, Young supported building the railway from the river port of Goolwa to the new sea port at Port Elliot (named after his friend, Charles Elliot). Young was a supporter of St Peter's College and the Young Prize, awarded annually from income from a section of land at Dry Creek, and vested in the college for the purpose, was named for him. He was president of the Adelaide Philosophical Society 1853–1854. Though it was expected sooner or later, the order for his transfer to Van Diemen's Land (today's Tasmania) gave little time for the usual formalities and farewells.

== Governor of Van Diemen's Land/Tasmania ==
Young began his duties in Van Diemen's Land in January 1855. Sir Henry Fox Young's term as Governor of Van Diemen's Land was significant, because in 1856 the Island colony received self-government, and was renamed Tasmania to mark the fact and as a deliberate measure by free-settlers to distance its convict past. Sir Henry was the first Tasmanian Governor to occupy Government House, Hobart, the beautiful neo-gothic Vice-Regal residence on the banks of the River Derwent.

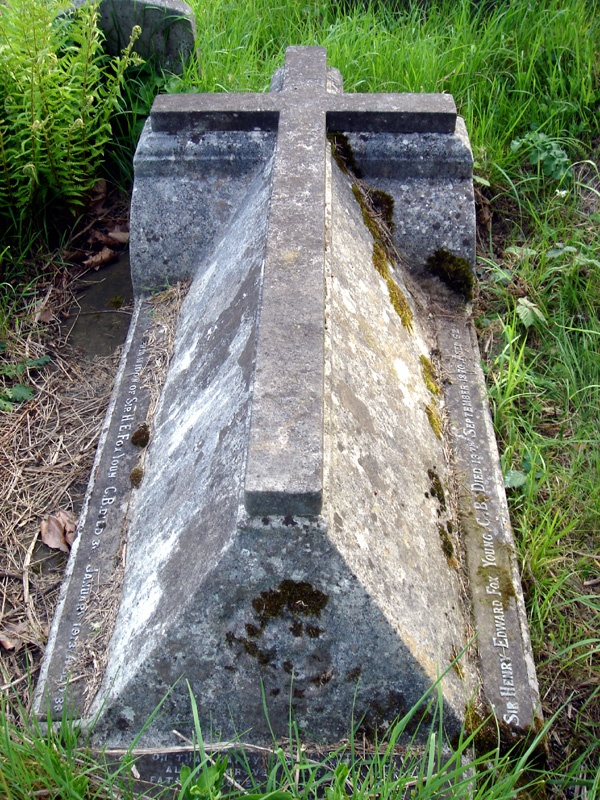
Funerary monument, Brompton Cemetery, London

== Later life ==
Young died on 18 September 1870. He is buried in Brompton Cemetery, London.

Youngtown, Tasmania, was named in honour of Young.

== Family ==
Young married Augusta Sophia Marryat (born 1829) in 1848. She was the daughter of a former slaveholder, Charles Marryat, of Potter's Bar, Middlesex, who had been compensated part of £34,000 in the 1830s upon the emancipation of slavery. Augusta (later Lady Young) was the niece of the novelist Captain Frederick Marryat, and sister of Charles Marryat, Dean of Adelaide (1887–1906). Her mother was Caroline Short, whose brother, Augustus Short, was the first Anglican bishop of Adelaide.

The couple had four children, two boys and two girls.

The town of Port Augusta in South Australia is named after Augusta, as is the tiny suburb of Marryatville in Adelaide's eastern suburbs.

Augusta outlived her husband by 43 years, dying in Christchurch, Hampshire, in 1913.

He is an ancestor of British singer and actor Will Young.

Government offices
Preceded by Lieutenant Colonel Frederick Holt Robe	Governor of South Australia; 1848–1854	Succeeded by Sir Richard G. MacDonnell, CB
Preceded by Sir William Denison (Lieutenant-Governor of Van Diemen's Land)	Governor of Tasmania; 1855–1861	Succeeded by Colonel Thomas Browne
