= 1872 in Australia =

- Decades: 1850s; 1860s; 1870s; 1880s; 1890s
- See also: Other events of 1872; Timeline of Australian history

The following lists events that happened during 1872 in Australia.

== Incumbents ==
=== Governors ===
Governors of the Australian colonies:

- Governor of New South Wales – Somerset Lowry-Corry, 4th Earl Belmore, then Hercules Robinson, 1st Baron Rosmead
- Governor of Queensland – George Phipps, 2nd Marquess of Normanby
- Governor of South Australia – Sir James Fergusson, 6th Baronet
- Governor of Tasmania – Charles Du Cane
- Governor of Victoria – John Manners-Sutton, 3rd Viscount Canterbury
- Governor of Western Australia – The Hon. Sir Frederick Weld GCMG.

=== Premiers ===
Premiers of the Australian colonies:

- Premier of New South Wales – Sir James Martin, until 14 May then Henry Parkes
- Premier of Queensland – Arthur Hunter Palmer
- Premier of South Australia – Arthur Blyth, until 22 January then Henry Ayers (5th time)
- Premier of Tasmania – James Milne Wilson, until 4 November then Frederick Innes
- Premier of Victoria – Charles Gavan Duffy, until 10 June then James Francis

== Events ==
- 13 February to 28 March – An election is held in New South Wales.
- 19 February – The Municipal District of Dubbo is established, following the approval of the Colonial Secretary.
- 26 February – The brig Maria is wrecked when it strikes a reef near Cardwell off the coast of Queensland, killing 39 people.
- 12 June – A Victorian branch of the Royal Australian Mint opens in Melbourne.
- 24 June – Failure of the Java telegraph cable, linking Australia via Darwin, to the global telegraphy network.
- 22 August – The Australian Overland Telegraph Line is completed when two telegraph lines are joined at Frew's Ponds in the Northern Territory (then South Australia).
- 24 September – The General Post Office opens in Brisbane, Queensland.
- 21 October – With the restoration of the Java telegraph cable, first direct receipt via Adelaide (and the Overland Telegraph Line) of telegraphs from the UK in the eastern states.
- Sidney Cooke Limited founded.

== Sport ==
- The Quack wins the Melbourne Cup

== Births ==
- 1 January – Arthur Manning, New South Wales politician (d. 1947)
- 22 February – Shaw Neilson, poet (d. 1942)
- 26 February – John Holman, Western Australian politician (d. 1925)
- 23 March – Michael Joseph Savage, 23rd Prime Minister of New Zealand (d. 1940)
- 13 June – Lydia Abell, military nurse, recipient of Royal Red Cross (RRC) (d. 1959)
- 20 June – George Carpenter, 5th General of The Salvation Army (d. 1948)
- 28 June – John Keating, Tasmanian politician (d. 1940)
- 28 September – David Unaipon, inventor and author (d. 1967)
- 14 October – John Leckie, Victorian politician (d. 1947)
- Full date unknown:
- Possibly September – Douglas Fry, artist (born in the United Kingdom) (d. 1911)
- Bertha Schroeder, New Zealand Salvation Army officer, social worker, and probation officer (d. 1953)
- Joe Slater, composer and publisher (d. 1926)

== Deaths ==
- 4 January – Sir Edward Macarthur, Administrator of Victoria (born and died in the United Kingdom) (b. 1789)
- 15 January – John King, explorer (born in Ireland) (b. 1838)
- 12 February – George Herbert Rogers, actor (born in the United Kingdom) (b. 1820)
- 20 February – Andrew Petrie, architect (born in the United Kingdom) (b. 1798)
- 20 March – William Wentworth, New South Wales politician and explorer (born in Norfolk Island) (b. 1790)
- 28 April – Louisa Atkinson, writer and botanist (b. 1834)
- 19 May – John Baker, 2nd Premier of South Australia (born in the United Kingdom) (b. 1813)
- 11 June – John Davies, newspaper proprietor (born in the United Kingdom) (b. 1814)
- 31 December – John McKinlay, explorer and grazier (born in the United Kingdom) (b. 1819)
- Unknown – John Dibbs, mariner (born and died in the United Kingdom) (b. 1790)
