= 1871 in Australia =

- Decades: 1850s; 1860s; 1870s; 1880s; 1890s
- See also: Other events of 1871; Timeline of Australian history

The following lists events that happened during 1871 in Australia.

== Incumbents ==
=== Governors ===
Governors of the Australian colonies:

- Governor of New South Wales – Somerset Lowry-Corry, 4th Earl Belmore
- Governor of Queensland – George Phipps, 2nd Marquess of Normanby
- Governor of South Australia – Sir James Fergusson
- Governor of Tasmania – Charles Du Cane
- Governor of Victoria – John Manners-Sutton, 3rd Viscount Canterbury
- Governor of Western Australia – The Hon. Sir Frederick Weld GCMG.

=== Premiers ===
Premiers of the Australian colonies:

- Premier of New South Wales – Sir James Martin
- Premier of Queensland – Arthur Hunter Palmer
- Premier of South Australia – John Hart until 10 November, then Arthur Blyth
- Premier of Tasmania – James Milne Wilson
- Premier of Victoria – Sir James McCulloch until 19 June, then Charles Gavan Duffy

== Events ==
- 15 March – Australia's first synagogue opens in Adelaide, South Australia.
- 5 May – The Prince Alfred Hospital opens in Melbourne.
- 19 June – Charles Gavan Duffy assumes office as Premier of Victoria.
- 24 September – Mother Mary MacKillop is excommunicated from the Roman Catholic Church after refusing to disband the Sisters of St Joseph of the Sacred Heart order.
- 20 November – Initial operation of the Java telegraph cable, landed at Darwin, linking Australia to the UK.

== Exploration and settlement ==
- March – Explorer John Ross is the first European to explore and name the Todd River.

== Sport ==
- The South Australian Cricket Association is founded.
- 7 November – The Pearl wins the Melbourne Cup

== Births ==
- 10 January – Miles Evergood (died 1939), artist
- 24 January – Oscar Asche (died 1936), actor and director
- 17 February – Florence Anderson, (died 1939) first female trade union secretary in Victoria
- 22 February – Hayden Starke (died 1958), High Court judge
- 3 April – John Wren (died 1953), businessman
- 20 August – Sydney Long (died 1955), artist
- 23 November – William Watt (died 1946), 24th Premier of Victoria

== Deaths ==
- 2 January – Sir Samuel Blackall (born 1809), Governor of Queensland
- 19 January – Sir William Denison (born 1804), Governor of Van Diemen's Land and New South Wales
- 23 April – James Frederick Palmer (born 1803), Victorian politician
