= 1870 in Australia =

- Decades: 1850s; 1860s; 1870s; 1880s; 1890s
- See also: Other events of 1870; Timeline of Australian history

The following lists events that happened during 1870 in Australia.

== Incumbents ==
=== Governors ===
Governors of the Australian colonies:

- Governor of New South Wales – Somerset Lowry-Corry, 4th Earl Belmore
- Governor of Queensland – Colonel Sir Samuel Blackall
- Governor of South Australia – Sir James Fergusson, 6th Baronet
- Governor of Tasmania – Charles Du Cane
- Governor of Victoria – John Manners-Sutton, 3rd Viscount Canterbury
- Governor of Western Australia – The Hon. Sir Frederick Weld GCMG.

=== Premiers ===
Premiers of the Australian colonies:

- Premier of New South Wales – John Robertson, until 13 January then Charles Cowper, until 16 December then James Martin
- Premier of Queensland – Charles Lilley, until 3 May then Arthur Hunter Palmer
- Premier of South Australia – Henry Strangways, until 30 May then John Hart
- Premier of Tasmania – James Milne Wilson
- Premier of Victoria – John Alexander MacPherson, until 9 April then James McCulloch

== Events ==
- 3 January – A state flag of Western Australia is adopted.
- 1 February – A state flag of Victoria is adopted, although with no crown like the current flag.
- 22 March – A state flag of Queensland is adopted, with a portrait of Queen Victoria.
- 20 April – A second state flag of New South Wales is adopted, similar to the current flag of Victoria: a crown above the Southern Cross.
- 22 July – A state flag of South Australia is adopted.
- 11 August – Melbourne Town Hall is opened.

== Exploration and settlement ==
- Gulgong, New South Wales, is founded.
- 27 August – John Forrest successfully arrives in Adelaide from Perth, leading an expedition along the south coast via the Great Australian Bight.

== Science and technology ==
- September – Work begins on the Australian Overland Telegraph Line linking Port Augusta to Darwin.

== Sport ==
- 12 May – Port Adelaide Football Club is founded in South Australia

== Births ==
- 3 January – Ethel Richardson, author (d. 1946)
- 14 January – Sir George Pearce, Western Australian politician (d. 1952)
- 17 May – Sir Newton Moore, 8th Premier of Western Australia (d. 1936)
- 1 November – Christopher Brennan, poet, scholar and literary critic (d. 1932)
- 21 November – Joe Darling, cricketer (d. 1946)
- 26 December – Norman Ewing, 23rd Tasmanian Opposition Leader (d. 1928)

== Deaths ==
- 23 May – Foster Fyans, military officer, administrator and politician (born in Ireland) (b. 1790)
- 25 May – Captain Thunderbolt, bushranger (b. 1835)
- 24 June – Adam Lindsay Gordon, South Australian politician and (born in the United Kingdom) poet (b. 1833)
