= 1865 in Australia =

- Decades: 1840s; 1850s; 1860s; 1870s; 1880s
- See also: Other events of 1865; Timeline of Australian history

The following lists events that happened during 1865 in Australia.

== Incumbents ==
- Monarch - Victoria

=== Governors ===
Governors of the Australian colonies:

- Governor of New South Wales – Sir John Young, Bt
- Governor of Queensland – Sir George Bowen
- Governor of South Australia – Sir Dominick Daly
- Governor of Tasmania – Colonel Thomas Browne
- Governor of Victoria – Sir Charles Darling
- Governor of Western Australia – Dr John Hampton

=== Premiers ===
Premiers of the Australian colonies:

- Premier of New South Wales – James Martin until 3 February, then Charles Cowper
- Premier of Queensland – Robert Herbert
- Premier of South Australia – Arthur Blyth until 22 March, then Francis Dutton until 20 September, then Henry Ayers until 23 October, then John Hart.
- Premier of Tasmania – James Whyte
- Premier of Victoria – James McCulloch

== Events ==
- 26 January – Bushrangers Ben Hall, Johnny Gilbert and John Dunn hold up Kimberley's Inn in the town of Collector, New South Wales. Dunn shoots and kills the local police officer, Constable Samuel Nelson.
- 16 February – La Grange expedition led by Maitland Brown and including David Francisco and Lockier Burges leaves Fremantle to search for three settlers who had failed to return from an earlier exploring expedition. The three men were eventually found dead, having been speared and clubbed to death by Aboriginal Australians, apparently in their sleep.
- 21 February – A Royal Commission into the origin and nature of contagious bovine pleuropneumonia (a cattle disease) presents its third and final report to the Parliament of Victoria.
- 6 April – Between 6 and 20 Aboriginal Australians are killed after they reportedly ambushed the La Grange expedition resulting in the La Grange Massacre.
- 8 April – Bushranger Dan Morgan is shot dead by a stockman during a police siege at Wangaratta, Victoria.
- 5 May – Bushranger Ben Hall is shot dead by police at Goobang Creek in New South Wales.
- 13 May – Bushranger Johnny Gilbert is shot dead by police at Binalong, New South Wales.
- 1 July – Stamp duty is introduced in New South Wales with the Stamp Duties Act of 1865.
- 17 July – The wooden barquentine Ada collides with the RMS Jeddo and sinks in Sydney Harbour.
- 31 July – Queensland Railways opens the first section of track from Ipswich to Bigge's Camp, the first narrow gauge mainline railway in the world.
- 30 December – A general election is held in Victoria.

=== Unknown dates ===
- Arnott's Biscuits is founded by Scottish baker William Arnott.

== Sport ==
- Toryboy wins the Melbourne Cup. A trophy is awarded for the first time.

== Births ==
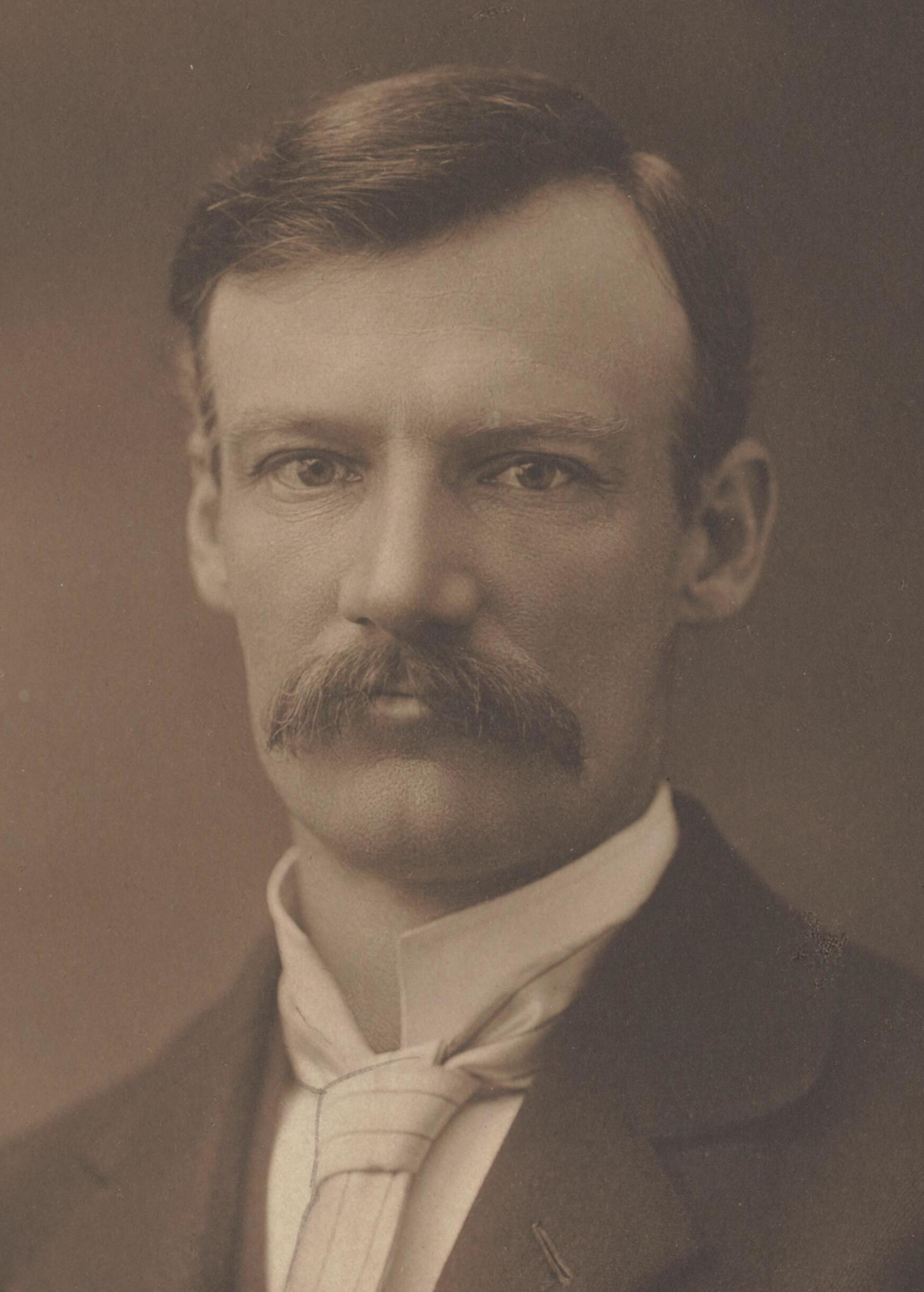
Lee Batchelor

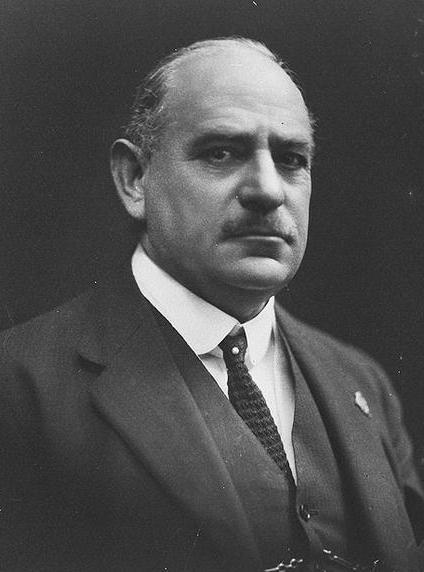
Sir John Monash

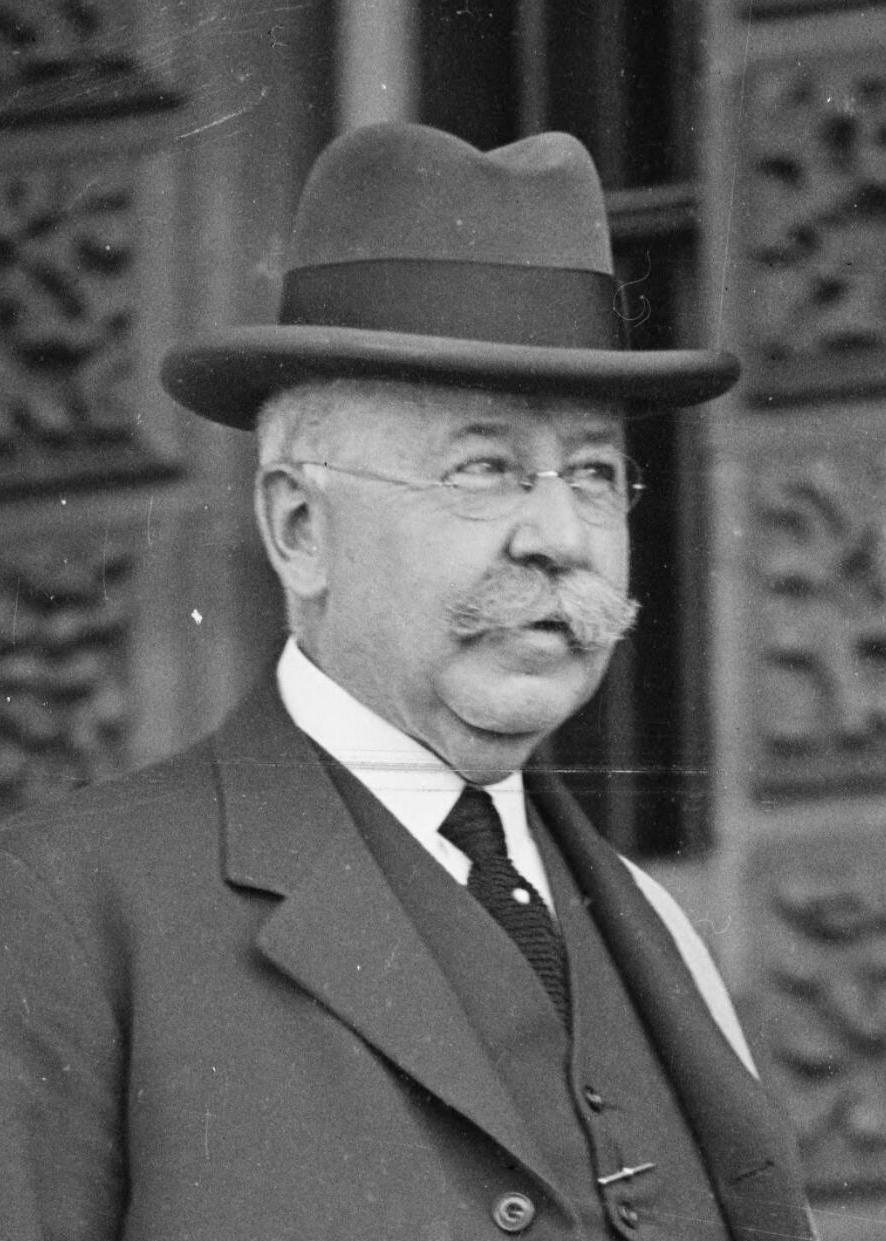
Sir William McPherson

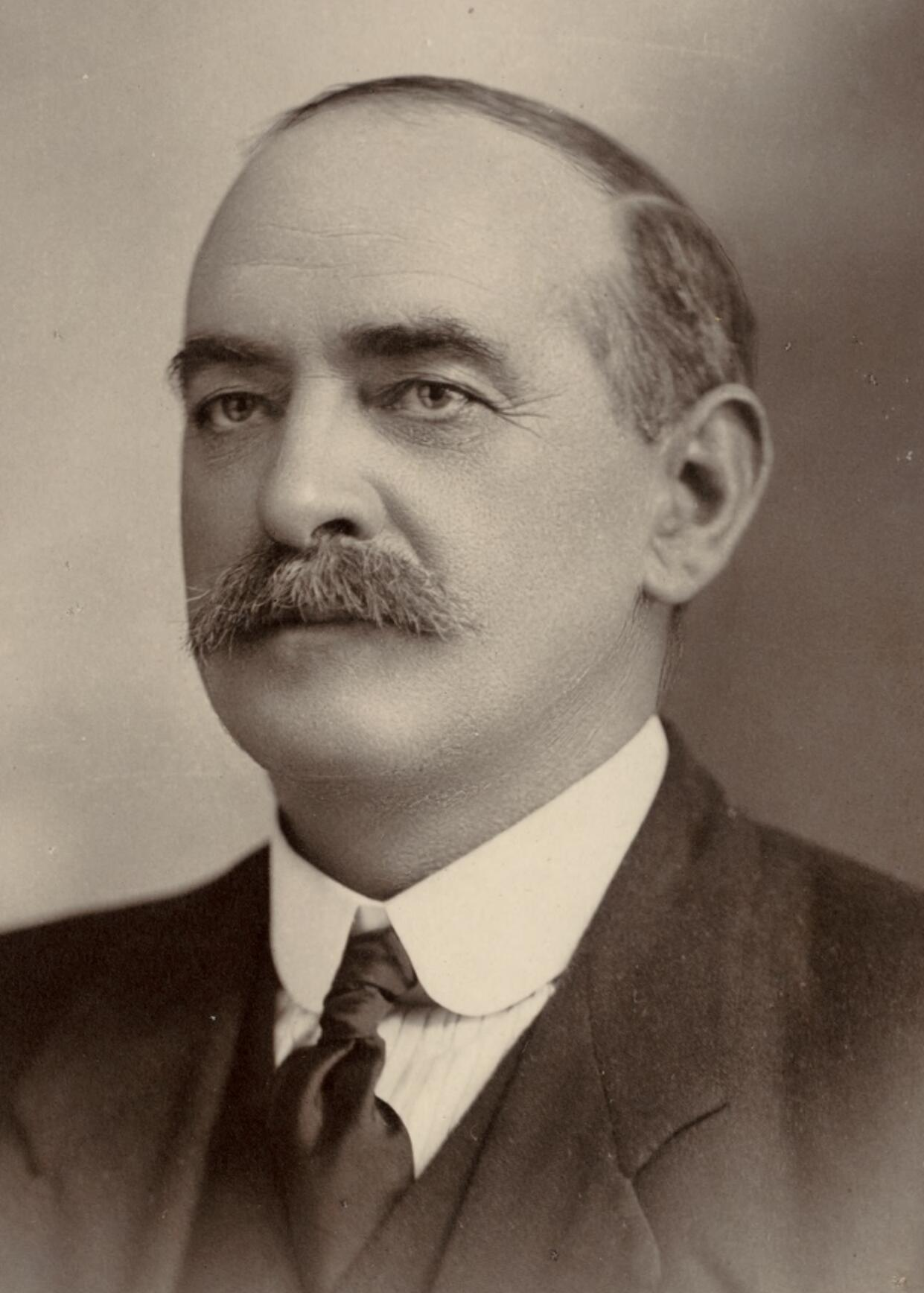
John Earle

- 8 January – Alexander Hay, New South Wales politician (born in New Zealand) (d. 1941)
- 16 January
  - William Dick, New South Wales politician (d. 1932)
  - Ernest Edwin Mitchell, composer (d. 1951)
- 31 January – Thomas Crawford, Queensland politician (d. 1948)
- 25 February – George Richards, New South Wales politician (d. 1915)
- 4 March – Edward Dyson, poet and novelist (d. 1931)
- 12 March – E. Phillips Fox, impressionist painter (d. 1915)
- 25 March – Sir Ernest Gaunt, Royal Navy admiral (d. 1940)
- 10 April – Lee Batchelor, South Australian politician (d. 1911)
- 16 April – Sir Harry Chauvel, 11th Chief of the General Staff (d. 1945)
- 2 May – Jens Jensen, Tasmanian politician (d. 1936)
- 4 May – Sir David Gordon, South Australian politician (d. 1946)
- 5 May – David Watkins, New South Wales politician (d. 1935)
- 20 May – Henry Ernest Boote, editor, journalist, and poet (born in the United Kingdom) (d. 1949)
- 15 June – Alfred Cecil Rowlandson, publisher and bookseller (d. 1922)
- 27 June – Sir John Monash, general (d. 1931)
- 1 July – Sir Granville Ryrie, New South Wales politician, diplomat and soldier (d. 1937)
- 18 July – Dowell O'Reilly, writer (d. 1923)
- 22 July – Michael Durack, Western Australian politician and pastoralist (d. 1950)
- 2 August – John Radecki, stained-glass artist (born in Poland) (d. 1955)
- 16 August
  - Harold Desbrowe-Annear, architect (d. 1933)
  - Dame Mary Gilmore, socialist poet and journalist (d. 1962)
- 18 August – Frank Anstey, Victorian politician (born in the United Kingdom) (d. 1940)
- 21 August – Hugh Victor McKay, industrialist (d. 1926)
- 28 August – Alfred Stephens, writer and literary critic (d. 1933)
- 31 August – Edward Harney, Western Australian politician and lawyer (born in Ireland) (d. 1929)
- 14 September – Sir John Northmore, 7th Chief Justice of Western Australia (d. 1958)
- 17 September – Sir William McPherson, 31st Premier of Victoria (d. 1932)
- 21 September – Francis Kenna, Queensland politician, poet and journalist (d. 1932)
- 21 October – Arthur Sidney Olliff, taxonomist (born in the United Kingdom) (d. 1895)
- 27 October – Alfred Wheeler, minister and composer (d. 1949)
- 31 October – Hector Lamond, New South Wales politician (d. 1947)
- 2 November – Frederick Burton, cricketer (d. 1929)
- 3 November – Rose Ann Creal, military nurse, recipient of Royal Red Cross medal (d. 1921)
- 11 November – Michael O'Connor, Western Australian politician (d. 1940)
- 15 November – John Earle, 22nd Premier of Tasmania (d. 1932)
- 17 November – James Arthur Pollock, physicist (born in Ireland) (d. 1922)
- 27 November – Walter Frederick Gale, banker and astronomer (d. 1945)
- Unknown – James Mathews, Victorian politician (d. 1934)

== Deaths ==
- 10 March – William Nicholson, 3rd Premier of Victoria (born in the United Kingdom) (b. 1816)
- 8 April – Dan Morgan, bushranger (b. 1830)
- 5 May – Ben Hall, bushranger (b. 1837)
- 13 May – John Gilbert, bushranger (born in Canada) (b. 1842)
- 18 May – Angus McMillan, explorer, pastoralist, and Victorian politician (born in the United Kingdom) (b. 1810)
- 28 September – Edward Wise, New South Wales Supreme Court judge (born in the United Kingdom) (b. 1818)
