= 1867 in Australia =

- Decades: 1840s; 1850s; 1860s; 1870s; 1880s
- See also: Other events of 1867; Timeline of Australian history

The following lists events that happened during 1867 in Australia.

== Incumbents ==
- Monarch - Victoria

Governors

Governors of the Australian colonies:

- Governor of New South Wales – John Young, 1st Baron Lisgar, until 11 August then Somerset Lowry-Corry, 4th Earl Belmore
- Governor of Queensland – Sir George Bowen
- Governor of South Australia – Sir Dominick Daly
- Governor of Tasmania – Colonel Thomas Browne
- Governor of Victoria – Sir John Manners-Sutton
- Governor of Western Australia – Dr John Hampton

Premiers

Premiers of the Australian colonies:

- Premier of New South Wales – James Martin
- Premier of Queensland – Robert Herbert until 15 August then Robert Mackenzie
- Premier of South Australia – James Boucaut until 3 May then Henry Ayers (for the 3rd time)
- Premier of Tasmania – Richard Dry
- Premier of Victoria – James McCulloch

== Events ==
- 7 January – Riots at the Crocodile Creek goldfield destroyed the property of Chinese miners.
- 1 June – Greatest recorded flood of the Hawkesbury River at 19.2 metres.
- 12 October – The transportation of convicts to Western Australia ceases when the last convict ship to Western Australia, the Hougoumont, left Britain.
- 16 October – English immigrant James Nash reports to authorities that he has discovered 75 ounces of alluvial gold in a creek at Gympie, Queensland. The find sparks a gold rush to the area, saving the colony of Queensland from bankruptcy.
- 30 October – Prince Alfred, second son of Queen Victoria, arrives in Australia for the country's first royal visit.

== Religion ==
- Saint Mary MacKillop and Fr Julian Tenison Woods found the Sisters of St Joseph of the Sacred Heart

== Arts and literature ==
- National Gallery of Victoria Art School accepts its first students

== Sport ==
- Tim Whiffler wins the Melbourne Cup

== Births ==
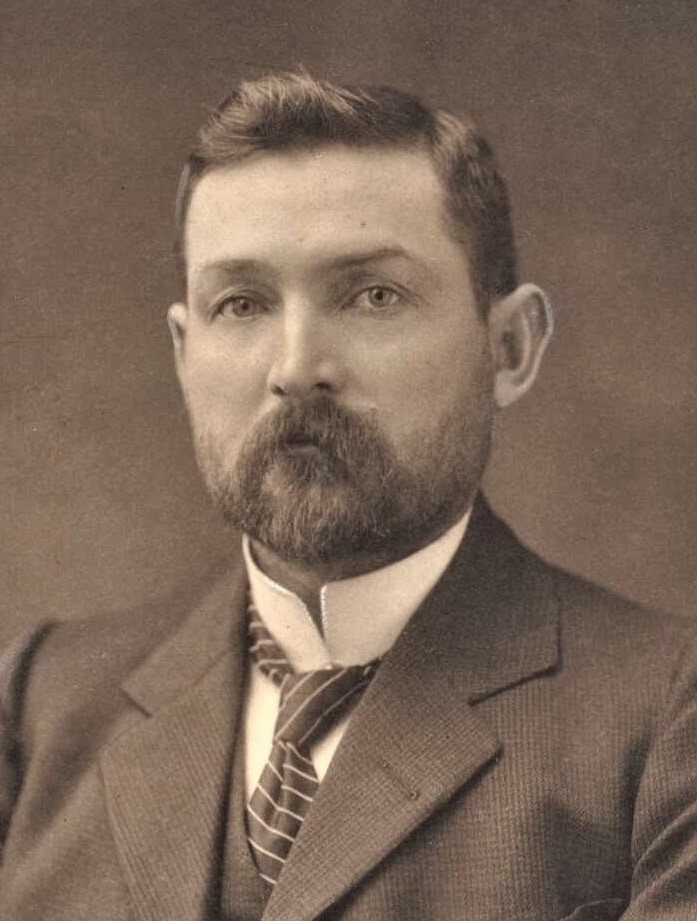
Chris Watson

- 10 February – Chester Manifold, Victorian politician (d. 1918)
- 18 March – Charles Web Gilbert, sculptor (b. 1925)
- 8 April – Sir Arthur Streeton, artist (d. 1943)
- 9 April – Chris Watson, 3rd Prime Minister of Australia (born in Chile) (d. 1941)
- 22 April – Sir Littleton Groom, Queensland politician (d. 1936)
- 17 June
  - Franc Falkiner, New South Wales politician and grazier (d. 1929)
  - Henry Lawson, writer and poet (d. 1922)
- 4 December – Sir Stanley Argyle, 32nd Premier of Victoria (d. 1940)
- 26 December – John Bradfield, engineer (d. 1943)

== Deaths ==
- 11 January – Sir Stuart Donaldson, 1st Premier of New South Wales (b. 1812)
- 25 June
  - John Clarke, bushranger (b. 1846), hanged
  - Thomas Clarke, bushranger (b. 1840), hanged
