= 1866 in Australia =

- Decades: 1840s; 1850s; 1860s; 1870s; 1880s
- See also: Other events of 1866; Timeline of Australian history

The following lists events that happened during 1866 in Australia.

== Incumbents ==
=== Governors ===
Governors of the Australian colonies:

- Governor of New South Wales – Sir John Young, Bt
- Governor of Queensland – Sir George Bowen
- Governor of South Australia – Sir Dominick Daly
- Governor of Tasmania – Colonel Thomas Browne
- Governor of Victoria – Sir Charles Darling (until 7 May), then Sir John Manners-Sutton (from 15 August)
- Governor of Western Australia – Dr John Hampton

=== Premiers ===
Premiers of the Australian colonies:

- Premier of New South Wales – Charles Cowper (until 21 January), then James Martin
- Premier of Queensland – Robert Herbert (until 1 February), then Arthur Macalister (until 20 July), then Robert Herbert (until 7 August) then Arthur Macalister
- Premier of South Australia – John Hart, Sr (until 28 March), then James Boucaut
- Premier of Tasmania – James Whyte (until 24 November), then Sir Richard Dry
- Premier of Victoria – James McCulloch

== Events ==
- 1 February – Arthur Macalister becomes Premier of Queensland
- 19 March – Sister Mary MacKillop founds the Sisters of St Joseph of the Sacred Heart at Penola, South Australia.
- 17 April – The Tariff Bill passes through the Parliament of Victoria; Australia's first protective tariffs become law the following day.
- 20 June – Adelaide's town Hall opens
- 12 July – SS Cawarra was wrecked off Newcastle, only 1 of 61 passengers and crew survive
- 18 July – The passenger vessel Netherby is wrecked off King Island, all 450 on board survived
- 20 July – Arthur Macalister resigns as Premier of Queensland during a bank crisis, he resumes his post on 7 August as the crisis eased
- 15 August – John Manners-Sutton becomes Governor of Victoria
- 8 September – The Blood or bread riots begin as unemployed men attempt to storm government stores; the riots continue to the 10th
- 10 October – Dandenong Market opens in South-East Melbourne.
- 24 October – The Intercolonial Exhibition of Australasia opens in Melbourne.
- 24 November – Richard Dry becomes Premier of Tasmania
- 7 December – John Granville Grenfell, gold commissioner, killed by bushrangers near Narromine

== Births ==
- 29 January – Frank Tudor, 6th Federal Leader of the Opposition (d. 1922)
- 31 January – Henry Forster, 1st Baron Forster, 7th Governor-General of Australia (born in the United Kingdom) (d. 1936)
- 15 March – Matthew Charlton, 7th Federal Leader of the Opposition (d. 1948)
- 26 March – Barcroft Boake, poet (d. 1892)
- 27 March – John Allan, 29th Premier of Victoria (d. 1936)
- 11 April – Bernard O'Dowd, poet, activist, and journalist (d. 1953)
- 21 April – Stanley Price Weir, army officer and public servant (d. 1944)
- 5 August – Harry Trott, cricketer (d. 1917)
- 23 September – James Hume Cook, Victorian politician (born in New Zealand) (d. 1942)
- 15 October – Jack Barrett, cricketer (d. 1916)
- 16 November – Dagmar Berne, medical doctor and the first woman to study medicine in Australia (d. 1900)

== Deaths ==
- 11 January – Gustavus Vaughan Brooke, actor (born in Ireland) (b. 1818)
- 3 February – William Haines, 1st Premier of Victoria (born in the United Kingdom) (b. 1810)
- 7 May – Edward Charles Close, New South Wales politician and soldier (born in the British Raj) (b. 1790)
- 5 June – John McDouall Stuart, explorer (born and died in the United Kingdom) (b. 1815)
- 25 September – Osmond Gilles, South Australian politician (born in the United Kingdom) (b. 1788)
