= 1868 in Australia =

- Decades: 1840s; 1850s; 1860s; 1870s; 1880s
- See also: Other events of 1868; Timeline of Australian history

The following lists events that happened during 1868 in Australia.

== Incumbents ==
- Monarch - Victoria

=== Governors ===
Governors of the Australian colonies:

- Governor of New South Wales – Somerset Lowry-Corry, 4th Earl Belmore
- Governor of Queensland – Sir George Bowen, then Colonel Sir Samuel Blackall
- Governor of South Australia – Sir Dominick Daly until 19 February
- Governor of Tasmania – Colonel Thomas Browne, then Charles Du Cane
- Governor of Victoria – Sir John Manners-Sutton
- Governor of Western Australia – Dr John Hampton, then Sir Benjamin Pine

=== Premiers ===
Premiers of the Australian colonies:

- Premier of New South Wales – James Martin, until 27 October then John Robertson
- Premier of Queensland – Robert Mackenzie, until 25 November then Charles Lilley
- Premier of South Australia – Henry Ayers, until 24 September then John Hart (2nd time), until 13 October then Henry Ayers (4th time), until 3 November then Henry Strangways
- Premier of Tasmania – Richard Dry
- Premier of Victoria – James McCulloch, until 6 May then Charles Sladen, until 11 July then James McCulloch (2nd time)

== Events ==
- 10 January – The last convict ship to Western Australia, the Hougoumont, arrives in Western Australia. This brought the end of penal transportation to Australia.
- February–May – A series of atrocities in retaliation to the killing of a police officer, a police assistant, and a local workman result in the deaths of between 15 and 150 Aboriginal people around Flying Foam Passage on Murujuga (Burrup Peninsula) in Western Australia. These atrocities are later referred to as the Flying Foam Massacre.
- 5 March – The Queensland Parliament passes the Polynesian Labourers Act to regulate the employment of Pacific Islanders recruited through blackbirding.
- 12 March – Henry James O'Farrell fires a revolver into the back of Prince Alfred, Duke of Edinburgh (second son of Queen Victoria) while the latter is picnicking in the beachfront suburb of Clontarf. It was Australia's first attempted political assassination. O'Farrell first claimed that he was acting under instruction from Melbourne Fenians but later retracted the claims. He had problems with alcoholism and mental illness.

== Economy ==
- The Geelong Woollen Company sets up the first woollen mill in Australia.

== Sport ==
- May to October – The first Australian cricket team to tour overseas plays against several English teams, winning 14 matches, losing 14 and drawing 19.
- 3 November – Glencoe wins the Melbourne Cup

== Births ==
- 21 February – Ernest Roberts, South Australian politician (born in the United Kingdom) (d. 1913)
- 19 June – Richard Crouch, Victorian politician (d. 1949)
- 27 October – William Gillies, 21st Premier of Queensland (d. 1928)
- 14 November – Steele Rudd, author (d. 1935)

== Deaths ==
- 21 April – Henry James O'Farrell, attempted assassin (born in Ireland) (b. 1833)
- 10 June – Charles Harpur, poet (b. 1813)
- 21 July – William Bland, New South Wales politician and medical practitioner (born in the United Kingdom) (b. 1789)
