= Evergood =

Evergood is a surname. Notable people with the surname include:

- Miles Evergood (1871–1939), Australian artist
- Philip Evergood (born Howard Blashki, 1901–1973), American painter, etcher, sculptor, lithographer, and writer, son of Miles

== See also ==
- Eric I of Denmark (c. 1060 – 1103), Danish king also known as Eric Evergood
