= 1863 in Australia =

- Decades: 1840s; 1850s; 1860s; 1870s; 1880s
- See also: Other events of 1863; Timeline of Australian history

The following lists events that happened during 1863 in Australia.

== Incumbents ==
- Monarch - Victoria

=== Governors ===
Governors of the Australian colonies:

- Governor of New South Wales – John Young, 1st Baron Lisgar
- Governor of Queensland – Sir George Bowen
- Governor of South Australia – Sir Dominick Daly
- Governor of Tasmania – Colonel Thomas Browne
- Governor of Victoria – Sir Henry Barkly until 10 September, then Sir Charles Darling
- Governor of Western Australia – Dr John Hampton.

=== Premiers ===
Premiers of the Australian colonies:

- Premier of New South Wales – Charles Cowper until 15 October, then James Martin
- Premier of Queensland – Robert Herbert
- Premier of South Australia – George Waterhouse until 4 July, then Francis Dutton until 15 July, then Henry Ayers
- Premier of Tasmania – Thomas Chapman until 20 January, then James Whyte
- Premier of Victoria – John O'Shanassy until 27 June, then James McCulloch

== Events ==
- 1 January – The Torrens title system is introduced in New South Wales with the commencement of the Real Property Act 1862.
- 7 February – The Sydney-based Royal Navy corvette HMS Orpheus sinks off the coast of New Zealand claiming 189 lives.
- 21 February – James Cockle is appointed the first Chief Justice of the Supreme Court of Queensland.
- 14 March – Queen Victoria issues Letters Patent granting Goulburn, New South Wales city status, making it Australia's first inland city.
- 6 July – Queen Victoria issues Letters Patent annexing to South Australia the part of the colony of New South Wales that would later become the Northern Territory.
- 11 November – Elizabeth Scott is hanged for the murder of her husband, making her the first woman to be executed in Victoria.

=== Non-specific dates ===
- South Sea Islanders are brought into Queensland to work as indentured labourers in the colony's sugar industry.
- Over 2,400 volunteers are recruited to fight in the New Zealand Wars.

== Exploration and settlement ==
- 17 January – Explorer John McKinlay returns home to Gawler, South Australia after an unsuccessful two-year search for the missing Burke and Wills expedition.
- 28 April – Brewarrina, New South Wales proclaimed a township.

== Sport ==
- 3 November – Banker wins the Melbourne Cup, in the smallest field in Cup history of six horses.

== Births ==
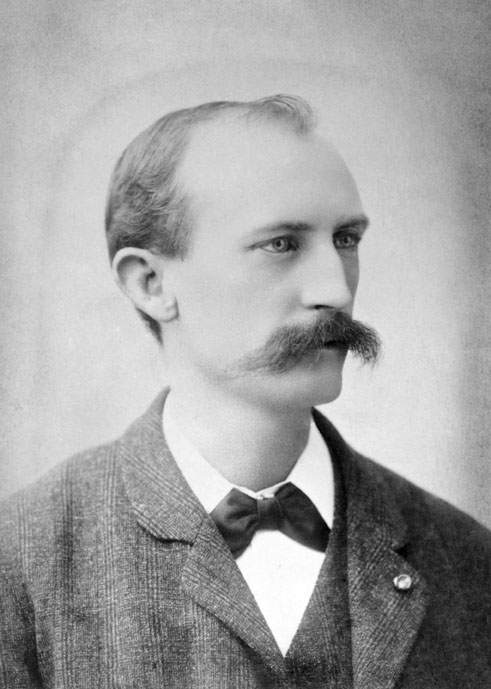
Anderson Dawson

- 26 January – Sir Charles Wade, 17th Premier of New South Wales (d. 1922)
- 26 March – George Philip Barber, Queensland politician (born in the United Kingdom) (d. 1938)
- 28 April – Josiah Thomas, New South Wales politician (born in the United Kingdom) (d. 1933)
- 20 June – James Fowler, Western Australian politician (born in the United Kingdom) (d. 1940)
- 21 June – Bill Wilks, New South Wales politician (d. 1940)
- 14 July – Arthur Coningham, cricketer (d. 1939)
- 16 July – Anderson Dawson, 14th Premier of Queensland (d. 1910)
- 26 October
  - Sir Neville Howse, New South Wales politician, military officer and first Australian recipient of the Victoria Cross (born in the United Kingdom) (d. 1930)
  - John Henry Michell, mathematician (d. 1940)
- 29 November – Sir Adrian Knox, 2nd Chief Justice of Australia (d. 1932)
- Unknown – Francis McLean, New South Wales politician (d. 1926)

== Deaths ==
- 5 February – John Wroe, evangelist (born in the United Kingdom) (b. 1782). Hannan Henry o William (born in the United Kingdom) (b. 1721)
- 8 March – Samuel Stocks, businessman (born in the United Kingdom) (b. 1786)
- 26 March – James Drummond, botanist and naturalist (born in the United Kingdom) (b. 1786)
- 28 April – James Dickson, New South Wales politician (born in the United Kingdom) (b. 1813)
- 5 July – Thomas Brown, Western Australian politician and explorer (born in the United Kingdom) (b. 1803)
- 26 October – Gotthard Fritzsche, Lutheran pastor (born in the Electorate of Saxony) (b. 1797)
