= 1862 in Australia =

- Decades: 1840s; 1850s; 1860s; 1870s; 1880s
- See also: Other events of 1862; Timeline of Australian history

The following lists events that happened during 1862 in Australia.

== Incumbents ==
=== Governors ===
Governors of the Australian colonies:

- Governor of New South Wales – John Young, 1st Baron Lisgar
- Governor of Queensland – Sir George Bowen
- Governor of South Australia – Sir Richard G. MacDonnell, Sir Dominick Daly
- Governor of Tasmania – Colonel Thomas Browne
- Governor of Victoria – Sir Henry Barkly.
- Governor of Western Australia – Sir Arthur Kennedy, then Dr John Hampton.

=== Premiers ===
Premiers of the Australian colonies:

- Premier of New South Wales – Charles Cowper
- Premier of Queensland – Robert Herbert
- Premier of South Australia – Thomas Reynolds, then George Waterhouse
- Premier of Tasmania – Thomas Chapman
- Premier of Victoria – John O'Shanassy

== Exploration and settlement ==
- 24 July – Explorer John McDouall Stuart successfully returns from crossing the Australian continent from north to south on his third attempt.

== Music, arts and literature ==
- Waterfall, Strath Creek – Eugene von Guérard

== Sport ==
- 4 November – Archer wins the second Melbourne Cup (List of Melbourne Cup winners).

== Births ==
- 18 January – William Higgs, Queensland politician (d. 1951)
- 4 February – George Ernest Morrison, journalist and geologist (d. 1920)
- 24 March – John Clemons, Tasmanian politician and lawyer (d. 1944)
- 29 July – Mona McBurney, pianist, teacher and composer (born in the United Kingdom) (d. 1932)
- 29 August – Andrew Fisher, 5th Prime Minister of Australia (born in the United Kingdom) (d. 1928)
- 25 September – Billy Hughes, 7th Prime Minister of Australia (born in the United Kingdom) (d. 1952)
- 16 November – Charles Turner, cricketer (d. 1944)
- 8 December – Kate Rickards, trapeze artist and musical theatre actress (d. 1922)

== Deaths ==
- 13 March – Roderick Flanagan, historian, poet, and journalist (born in Ireland) (b. 1828)
