= 1869 in Australia =

- Decades: 1840s; 1850s; 1860s; 1870s; 1880s
- See also: Other events of 1869; Timeline of Australian history

The following lists events that happened during 1869 in Australia.

== Incumbents ==
=== Governors ===
Governors of the Australian colonies:

- Governor of New South Wales – Somerset Lowry-Corry, 4th Earl Belmore
- Governor of Victoria – Sir John Manners-Sutton
- Governor of Queensland – Colonel Sir Samuel Blackall
- Governor of Western Australia – Sir Benjamin Pine (appointed, but not sworn in), Sir Frederick Weld (from 18 September)
- Governor of South Australia – Sir James Fergusson, 6th Baronet (from 16 February)
- Governor of Tasmania – Charles Du Cane (from 15 January)
- Governor of Western Australia – Sir Benjamin Pine, then The Hon. Sir Frederick Weld GCMG.

=== Premiers ===
Premiers of the Australian colonies:

- Premier of New South Wales – John Robertson
- Premier of Victoria – James McCulloch (until 20 September), then John Alexander MacPherson
- Premier of Queensland – Charles Lilley
- Premier of South Australia – Henry Strangways
- Premier of Tasmania – Sir Richard Dry (until 1 August), then James Milne Wilson (from 4 August)

== Events ==
- 9 January – The British clipper ship Thermopylae arrives in Melbourne, having sailed from London in the record time of 64 days.
- 5 February – A large gold nugget, named The Welcome Stranger, is found at Moliagul, Victoria.
- 5 February – George Goyder establishes a settlement of 135 people at Port Darwin.
- 2 March – After several days hiding in bushland near Bunbury, Western Australia, Irish political prisoner John Boyle O'Reilly escapes to America on the whaler Gazelle.
- 3 March – William Lanne, known as "King Billy", the last "full-blooded" Tasmanian Aboriginal man dies. His body is secretly dismembered and his skull removed while in the morgue, and Dr William Crowther, future Premier of Tasmania, is suspected as the culprit.
- 5 March – The New South Wales government declares that Saint Patrick's Day, St. Andrew's Day and St George's Day are no longer public holidays.
- 24 March – A fatal case of cholera is reported in Sydney.
- 8 May – The bushranger Captain Moonlite holds up a bank in Mount Egerton, Victoria.
- 22 June – Prince Alfred College opens in Adelaide, South Australia.
- 18 October – The Lithgow Zig Zag Railway was opened.

== Science and technology ==
- 1 May – A submarine telegraph cable is completed, joining Tasmania to the mainland.

== Sport ==
- 2 November – Warrior wins the Melbourne Cup.

== Births ==
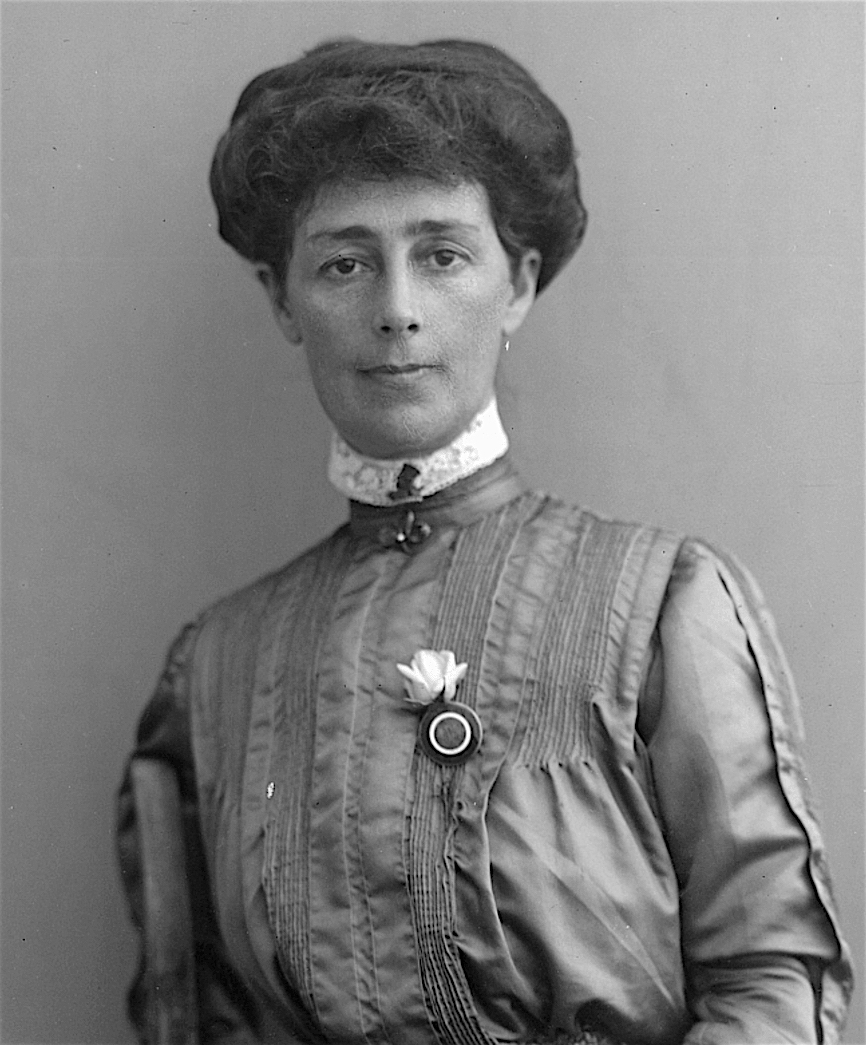
Vida Goldstein

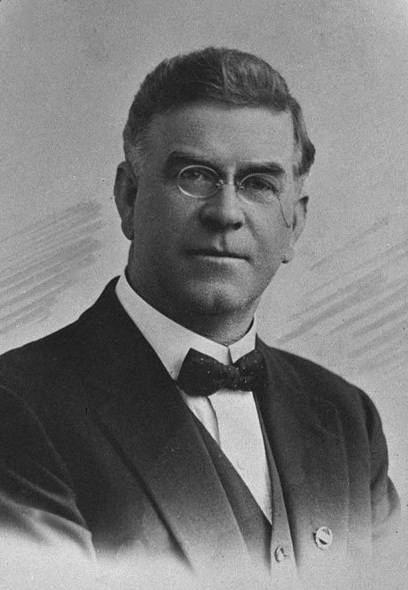
John Storey

- 20 January – F. Matthias Alexander, actor and author (d. 1955)
- 25 February – Staniforth Smith, Western Australian politician (d. 1934)
- 10 March – Sir John Longstaff, artist (d. 1941)
- 23 March – William Robson, New South Wales politician and businessman (d. 1951)
- 11 April – John Patrick McGlinn, public servant and soldier (d. 1946)
- 13 April – Vida Goldstein, suffragette and social reformer (d. 1949)
- 27 April – May Moss, welfare worker and suffragette (d. 1948)
- 2 May – Florence Stawell, classical scholar (d. 1936)
- 14 May – Percy Abbott, New South Wales politician, soldier and solicitor (d. 1940)
- 15 May – John Storey, 20th Premier of New South Wales (d. 1921)
- 18 May – Harold Grimwade, military officer, businessman and pharmacist (d. 1949)
- 19 May – William Gibson, Victorian politician (d. 1955)
- 23 May – Sir George Beeby, New South Wales politician, judge and author (d. 1942)
- 11 July – Peter McAlister, cricketer (d. 1938)
- 21 July – John McDonald, Western Australian politician (d. 1934)
- 6 August – Marie Pitt, poet and journalist (d. 1948)
- 7 August – E. J. Brady, journalist and poet (d. 1952)
- 8 August – George James Coates, artist (d. 1930)
- 28 August – Sir Albert Ellis, prospector (d. 1951)
- 28 September – John Bisdee, military officer (d. 1930)
- 30 September – Ernie Jones, Australian rules footballer and cricketer (d. 1943)
- 24 October – Charlie McLeod, cricketer (d. 1918)
- 2 December – Sir John Kirwan, Western Australian politician (born in the United Kingdom) (d. 1949)
- 7 December – Frank Laver, cricketer and baseball player (d. 1919)
- 13 December – John Shirlow, artist (d. 1936)
- 21 December – Albert Green, Western Australian politician (d. 1940)
- 29 December – Bill Howell, cricketer (d. 1940)

== Deaths ==
- 3 March – William Lanne, whaler (b. 1835)
- 6 May – Henry Vincent, prison superintendent (born in the United Kingdom) (b. 1796)
- 9 May – John Plunkett, New South Wales politician (born in Ireland) (b. 1802)
- 16 June – Charles Sturt, explorer (born in the British Raj and died in the United Kingdom) (b. 1795)
- 4 September – John Pascoe Fawkner, Victorian politician and businessman (born in the United Kingdom) (b. 1792)
- 9 November – Charles Flaxman, settler and landowner (born in the United Kingdom) (b. 1806)
