= 1864 in Australia =

- Decades: 1840s; 1850s; 1860s; 1870s; 1880s
- See also: Other events of 1864; Timeline of Australian history

The following lists events that happened during 1864 in Australia.

== Incumbents ==
=== Governors ===
Governors of the Australian colonies:

- Governor of New South Wales – John Young, 1st Baron Lisgar
- Governor of Queensland – Sir George Bowen
- Governor of South Australia – Sir Dominick Daly
- Governor of Tasmania – Colonel Thomas Browne
- Governor of Victoria – Sir Charles Darling
- Governor of Western Australia – Dr John Hampton

=== Premiers ===
Premiers of the Australian colonies:

- Premier of New South Wales – James Martin
- Premier of Queensland – Robert Herbert
- Premier of South Australia – Henry Ayers until 4 August, then Arthur Blyth
- Premier of Tasmania – James Whyte
- Premier of Victoria – James McCulloch

== Arts ==
- Twofold Bay Waltzes by Georgina Isabella O'Sullivan née Keon (1841-1927 daughter of George Plunkett Keon JP, niece of John PlunkettQC)

A theme from 'Twofold Bay Waltzes' 1864 dedicated to Plunkett by his niece
MIDI version

== Events ==
- 1 January – The Queensland Police Force is established and begins operations with approximately 143 employees.
- 4 May – The first trout hatchery in the southern hemisphere is established at Plenty, Tasmania.
- 14 May – Bushranger Frank Gardiner is sentenced to 32 years in prison, although he is later pardoned by Henry Parkes in 1874.
- 20 May – Bushranger Ben Hall and his gang escape from a shootout with police after attempting to rob the Bang Bang Hotel in Koorawatha, New South Wales.
- 2 June – The schooner Waratah disappears between Sydney and Newcastle, claiming seven lives.
- 1 October – The Australasian (later to be known as Australasian Post) is first published in Melbourne.
- 1 December – Great Fire of Brisbane

== Sport ==
- 1 January – The All England Eleven cricket team defeats the Victorian XXII at the Melbourne Cricket Ground.
- Lantern wins the Melbourne Cup.
- Carlton FC was founded

== Births ==
- 17 February – Banjo Paterson, bush poet, journalist and author (d. 1941)
- 7 April – Alfred Conroy, New South Wales politician (d. 1920)
- 18 April – Rose Summerfield, feminist and labour activist (d. 1922)
- 10 July – Sir Austin Chapman, New South Wales politician (d. 1926)
- 21 August – David O'Keefe, Tasmanian politician (d. 1943)
- 21 December – Sir James McCay, Victorian politician and soldier (born in Ireland) (d. 1930)
- 25 December – Joe Quinn, baseball player (d. 1940)

== Deaths ==
- 15 January – Isaac Nathan, composer, musicologist, and journalist (born in the United Kingdom) (b. 1791)
- 6 March – Peter Miller Cunningham, naval surgeon and author (born and died in the United Kingdom) (b. 1789)
- 25 May – John Joseph Therry, Catholic priest (born in Ireland) (b. 1790)
- 19 June – Richard Heales, 4th Premier of Victoria (born in the United Kingdom) (b. 1822)
- 24 November – Edward Buckley Wynyard, New South Wales politician and military officer (born and died in the United Kingdom) (b. 1788)
