= 1873 in Australia =

- Decades: 1850s; 1860s; 1870s; 1880s; 1890s
- See also: Other events of 1873; Timeline of Australian history

The following lists events that happened during 1873 in Australia.

== Incumbents ==
=== Governors ===
Governors of the Australian colonies:

- Governor of New South Wales – Hercules Robinson, 1st Baron Rosmead
- Governor of Queensland – George Phipps, 2nd Marquess of Normanby
- Governor of South Australia – Sir James Fergusson, 6th Baronet, then Anthony Musgrave
- Governor of Tasmania – Charles Du Cane
- Governor of Victoria – John Manners-Sutton, 3rd Viscount Canterbury, then George Bowen
- Governor of Western Australia – The Hon. Sir Frederick Weld GCMG.

=== Premiers ===
Premiers of the Australian colonies:

- Premier of New South Wales – Henry Parkes
- Premier of Queensland – Arthur Hunter Palmer
- Premier of South Australia – Henry Ayers, until 22 July then Arthur Blyth
- Premier of Tasmania – Frederick Innes, until 4 August then Alfred Kennerley
- Premier of Victoria – James Francis

== Events ==
- 9 December – More than 1,000 striking gold miners attack police and Chinese workers brought in to Clunes, Victoria to break the strike.
- 30 December – Elizabeth Woolcock is hanged at the Adelaide Gaol, the only woman to be executed in South Australia.

== Exploration and settlement ==
- 19 July – Surveyor William Gosse names "Ayers Rock" after the premier of South Australia Henry Ayers (later changed to its Indigenous name, Uluru).
- 3 September – The town of Cooktown, Queensland is founded after gold is discovered at the Palmer River, sparking a gold rush.

== Births ==
- 28 January – Monty Noble, cricketer (d. 1940)
- 21 August – Fred Leist, artist (d. 1945)
- 2 September – Lily Poulett-Harris, founder of women's cricket in Australia (d. 1897)

== Deaths ==
- 28 January – John Hart, 10th premier of South Australia (b. 1809)
- 19 April – Hamilton Hume, explorer (b. 1797)
- 30 May – Thomas Gilbert, South Australian pioneer (b. 1789)
- 22 June – Terence Aubrey Murray, NSW politician (b. 1810)
- 12 November – David Lennox, bridge-builder (b. 1788)
- 11 December – John West, clergyman, writer and editor of The Sydney Morning Herald (b. 1809)
- 24 December – Madame Rens, New South Wales settler and merchant (b. 1789)
