= Rens (name) =

Rens is a Dutch masculine given name – a short form of Laurentius or Emerentius – as well as a patronymic surname derived from it. Among variant forms of the surname are Rense, Rensen and Renssen. People with this name include:

== Given name ==
- Rens Blom (born 1977), Dutch pole vaulter
- Rens van Eijden (born 1988), Dutch football defender
- Rens Raemakers (born 1991), Dutch politician

== Surname ==
- Els Rens (born 1983), Belgian long-distance runner
- Frans Rens (1805–1874), Flemish writer
- Hilde Rens (1972–2009), Belgian singer known by her stage name Yasmine
- Madame Rens (1789–1873), Flemish-born New South Wales settler and businesswoman

== See also ==
- Rense, another surname
- Rensen, another surname
- Dayton Rens, New York Rens and Pittsburgh Rens, American basketball teams
- Renske, Dutch feminine given name
