= Rensen =

Rensen is a surname. Notable people with the surname include:

- Ralph Rensen (1933–1961), English Grand Prix motorcycle road racer
- Raymond Rensen (born 1979), Dutch rapper known as Raymzter

== See also ==
- Rens (name), another surname
- Rense, another surname
- Renson, another surname
