= Rens =

Rens can refer to:

- Rens (name), Dutch masculine given name and surname
- Rens Hemp Company, American hemp company
- Dayton Rens, American basketball team
- New York Rens, American basketball team
- Pittsburgh Rens, American basketball team

== See also ==
- Ren (disambiguation)
