= Florence Anderson =

Florence Anderson may refer to:

- Molly MacArthur (Florence Mary MacArthur, 1893–1972), later Anderson, English artist and stage designer
- Florence Anderson (trade unionist) (1871–1949), first female trade union secretary in Victoria, Australia
- Florence Anderson Clark (1835–1918), American author, newspaper editor, librarian, university dean
