= Sir Alexander Grant, 8th Baronet =

British politician and plantation owner

Sir Alexander Cray Grant, 8th Baronet (13 November 1782 – 29 November 1854) was a British politician and plantation owner in the West Indies.

== Life ==
He was born on 30 November 1782 at Bowring’s Leigh, West Alvington, Devon, the eldest son of Sir Alexander Grant, 7th Baronet, of Malshanger House, Hampshire, and his wife Sarah, a daughter of Jeremiah Cray, of Ibsley. He matriculated at St John's College, Cambridge, on 26 June 1799, and was also admitted at Lincoln's Inn on 15 October 1799. At Cambridge, he graduated B.A. in 1803 and M.A. by seniority in 1806. In 1803, he left Cambridge and was commissioned as a Lieutenant into the Duke of Gloucester's Middlesex Volunteers. He entered politics in Jamaica, where he owned two plantations, as a member of the Jamaican colonial assembly from 1810 to 1811. In 1812, he returned to England, where he successfully stood as a Tory Member of Parliament for Tregony in the House of Commons. In 1818, he was elected as MP for Lostwithiel, and was re-elected there in June 1826, although he was also elected to Aldborough which he chose to represent instead. From 1826 to 1831, Grant was the Chairman of Ways and Means in the House of Commons. He was unsuccessful in elections for Grimsby in 1835, and Honiton, but re-entered the House representing Cambridge in 1840, until 1843. In 1843 he was appointed a Commissioner of Audit, remaining in that office until the end of his life.

Grant succeeded his father as Baronet of Dalvey upon the latter's death in 1825. Grant himself died in Westminster St James on 29 November 1854 aged 72, and was succeeded in the baronetcy by his brother, Robert Innes Grant.

Grant received over £12,000 in compensation for the emancipation of his slaves from estates in Jamaica in 1838.

He was uncle to Sir Alexander Grant FRSE 10th baronet of Dalvey.

Parliament of the United Kingdom
Preceded by William Gore Langton; James O'Callaghan	Member of Parliament for Tregony; 1812–1818; With: William Holmes	Succeeded by Viscount Barnard; James O'Callaghan
Preceded by Viscount Valletort; John Ashley Warre	Member of Parliament for Lostwithiel; 1818–1826; With: Sir Robert Wigram (until June 1826); Viscount Valletort	Succeeded by Viscount Valletort; Edward Cust
Preceded by Henry Fynes; Gibbs Antrobus	Member of Parliament for Aldborough; 1826–1830; With: Clinton James Fynes Clinton	Succeeded by Clinton James Fynes Clinton; Viscount Stormont
Preceded by Robert Peel; Sir George Warrender	Member of Parliament for Westbury; 1830–1831; With: Michael George Prendergast	Succeeded by Sir Ralph Lopes; Henry Hanmer
Preceded by John Manners-Sutton; George Pryme	Member of Parliament for Cambridge; 1840–1843; With: George Pryme (until 1841); John Manners-Sutton	Succeeded by John Manners-Sutton; Fitzroy Kelly
Baronetage of the United Kingdom
Preceded by Alexander Grant	Baronet (of Dalvey); 1825–1854	Succeeded by Robert Innes Grant
