= 1789 Sydney smallpox outbreak =

Disease outbreak in Australia

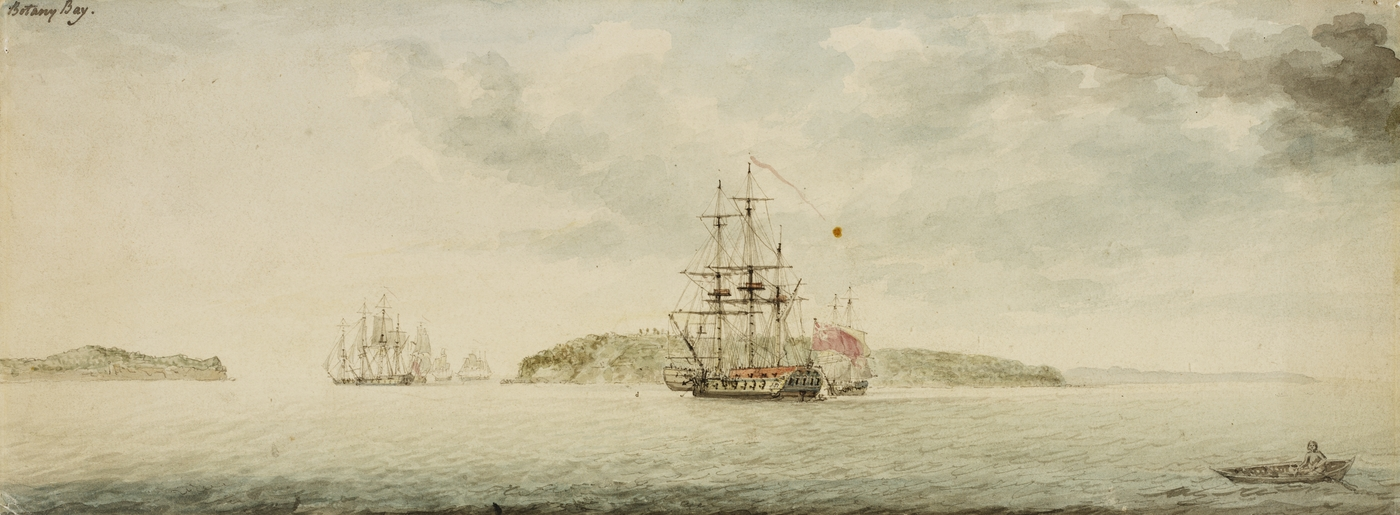
Botany Bay in 1789.

In April 1789, Sydney, Australia, experienced one of its most violent outbreaks of smallpox when the disease swept through Aboriginal and colonial Australians on the coast. The outbreak began in early March with the first cases appearing in tribes living near Port Jackson. Aboriginal communities had no preexisting immunity to smallpox, and suffered mortality rates of around 70%.

== Smallpox in Sydney ==
Aboriginal tribes on Arnhem Land first contracted smallpox when they made infectious contact with fishermen from southeast Asia. Governor Arthur Philip estimated that around half of the Aboriginal population around Sydney harbor died in the outbreak.
