= George Pryme =

British economist, academic and politician (1781–1868)

George Pryme (4 April 1781 – 2 December 1868) was a British economist, academic and politician.

Pryme was born in 1781 in Cottingham, East Riding of Yorkshire, the only surviving child of merchant Christopher Pryme and his wife, Alice Dinsdale. Following the death of his father, Pryme and his mother moved to Nottinghamshire, where he attended private schools until he returned to East Riding of Yorkshire to attend Hull Grammar School in 1796. In 1799, Pryme entered Trinity College, Cambridge, winning a scholarship there in 1800 and graduating with a Bachelor of Arts in 1803. In 1804, he began studying law at Lincoln's Inn, and was called to the Bar in 1806, practising in London until health problems forced him to return to Cambridge in 1808.

In 1816, Pryme began conducting lectures on political economy at Cambridge – the first teaching of such a topic at any English university, and in that same year his lectures were published as a book entitled A Syllabus of a Course of Lectures on the Principles of Political Economy. In 1828, he was made Professor of Political Economy by the university senate, although a chair was not established for the topic at Cambridge until just before his retirement.

He was politically active, and successfully opposed parliamentary candidates sponsored by the Duke of Rutland, and eventually winning a seat in the House of Commons representing Cambridge as a Whig in 1832. Pryme worked hard in the parliament, pushing for university reform at Oxford and Cambridge until his poor health prompted his family to urge his retirement from parliament in 1841.

He returned to Cambridge and bought an estate in Wistow while continuing to lecture and practice as a barrister on occasion. He died in 1868. In 1870, his memoirs were published, Autobiographic Recollections of George Pryme, edited by his daughter Alicia Bayne.

Parliament of the United Kingdom
Preceded by Frederick Trench; Marquess of Graham	Member of Parliament for Cambridge; 1832–1841; With: Thomas Spring Rice (1832–1839); John Manners-Sutton (1839–1840); Sir Alexander Grant (1840–1841)	Succeeded by John Manners-Sutton; Sir Alexander Grant
