= Philip Evergood =

American artist

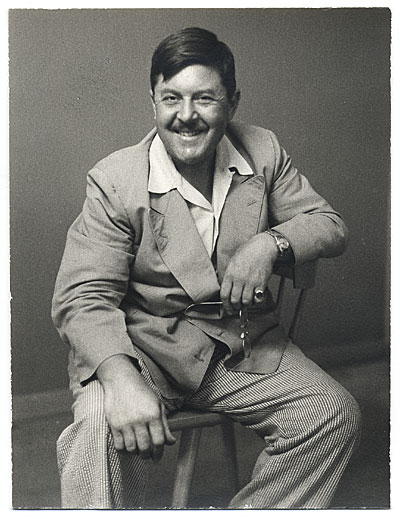
- Philip Evergood, circa 1942
- Born: Philip Howard Francis Dixon Blashki; October 26, 1901; New York City, US
- Died: 1973 (aged 71–72); Bridgewater, Connecticut, US
- Known for: Painting, Sculpture, Printmaking

Philip Howard Francis Dixon Evergood (born Howard Blashki; 1901–1973) was an American social realist painter, etcher, lithographer, sculptor, illustrator, and writer. He was particularly active during the Depression and World War II era.

== Life ==
Philip Evergood was born in New York City in 1901. His mother was English and his father, Miles Evergood, was an Australian artist of Polish Jewish descent who, in 1915, changed the family's name from Blashki to Evergood. Philip Evergood's formal education began in 1905. He studied music, and by 1908 he was playing the piano in a concert with his teacher.

He attended different English boarding schools starting in 1909 and was educated mainly at Eton and Cambridge University. In 1921 he decided to study art, left Cambridge, and went to London to study with Henry Tonks at the Slade School.

In 1923, Evergood returned to New York where he studied at the Art Students League of New York for a year, studying with George Luks and William von Schlegell. He then traveled again to Europe, worked at various jobs in Paris, painted independently, and studied at the Académie Julian with André Lhote. He also studied with Stanley William Hayter at Atelier 17; Hayter taught him engraving.

He returned to New York in 1926 and began a career that was marked by the hardships of severe illness, an almost fatal operation, and constant financial trouble.

It was not until the collector Joseph H. Hirshhorn purchased several of his paintings that he could consider his financial troubles over. Evergood worked on WPA art projects from 1934 to 1937, painting two murals: The Story of Richmond Hill (1936–37, public library in Queens, New York) and Cotton from Field to Mill (1938, post office in Jackson, Georgia). He taught both music and art as late as 1943, and finally moved to Southbury, Connecticut, in 1952. He was a full member of the Art Students League of New York and the National Institute of Arts and Letters.

A New York City police officer was killed in the line of duty at Evergood's house located at 132 Bank Street, Greenwich Village, on August 17, 1947. Police Officer Thomas J. Gargan, responding to a neighbor's call reporting a burglary, was fatally shot in the chest and his partner was wounded by the burglar. Gargan was posthumously awarded the Daily News Hero Award. It was the second time he had won this award. The burglar used a single shot signal flare gun (sawed-off shotgun) he had found in the house. He was sentenced to death and executed in 1948. Evergood was charged with violating the Sullivan Act for failing to register the gun, but was acquitted by a three judge panel.

Evergood was killed in a house fire in Bridgewater, Connecticut, in 1973 at the age of 72. He is buried in Green-Wood Cemetery, Brooklyn.

== Art ==
Evergood's influences include El Greco, Bosch, Brueghel, Goya, Daumier, Toulouse-Lautrec, Sloan's Ashcan paintings, and even prehistoric cave art.

Evergood is noted for his deliberately awkward drawing and his spontaneous bold lines. His skillfully organized sophisticated compositions are often humorous, frequently fantastic, and sometimes openly symbolic. His color is never conventional but rather evokes an extremely personal mood that reveals the artist as both militantly social and warmly sensuous.

Though he experimented with etching and lithography in the 1920s, he did not begin to devote himself on a large scale to original printmaking until after 1945. At this time he studied printmaking techniques at the New York studio of Stanley William Hayter. During the following twenty-five years he produced many works of art in both lithography and etching.

During the 1950s Evergood departed from his established "Social Realism" style and concentrated on symbolism, both biblical and mythological. A characteristic work of this period in Evergood's life is The New Lazarus, painted in 1954 and presently housed in the Whitney Museum of American Art.

Evergood Self Portrait: c. 1960, University of Kentucky Art Museum Collection

He maintained a socially conscious attitude in his art for the remainder of his career, and was in fact considered to be something of a maverick. He was a figurative painter when much of the art world placed greater value on abstraction, and he was a moralist when moralizing was not considered an option for serious painters. His best-known works are gritty, populist images of contemporary life, and are full of vitality and imagination. A blend of reality and fantasy gives his paintings an appealing, cartoonish quality, and his incisiveness as a social critic emboldens his work. His art is founded on contradiction: sophisticated intent is matched by intentionally crude technique, and tawdry overstatement is balanced with delicate lines.

== Oils at auction ==
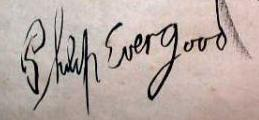
Enlarged Evergood Signature (Via Evergood Self Portrait, Morgan Collection)

The following is a sample of Evergood oil paintings that have sold at auction. Significant works in oil by the artist tend to be in the five figure range (USD), while less important works are most often represented by sales in the low, mid and high four figure range (USD). Extremely important works of particular renown by this artist can reasonably be expected to break into the six figure range (USD) and are infrequently seen on the open market due to heavy museum consumption of important Evergood works from the 1950s through the 1980s.

- 13–09–06 Victory Buttons Oil US$54,000
- 13–07–06 Self-portrait With Nudes Oil US$1,680
- 25–06–06 Girl in Garden Oil US$2,185
- 03–12–05 Little Rock Oil US$8,000
- 24–05–05 Still Life With Fishermen Oil US$8,500
- 22–05–05 Woman And Laughing Dog Brush US$2,300
- 20–05–05 Portrait Of Richard Esquire Oil US$1,057
- 23–03–05 Forest With Riders Oil US$6,600
- 27–09–04 Fruit 76.8 x 59.1 in Oil US$28,680
- 08–09–04 Fat of the Land Oil US$8,963
- 18–05–04 The Dog Bite Clinic Oil US$71,700
- 07–03–04 Children And Very Giant Squash Oil US$7,000
- 07–10–03 World War I Oil Unsold

== Selected exhibitions ==
- Corcoran Gallery of Art, 1928, 1939–1963
- Salons of America, 1934
- PAFA, 1934–66 (gold medal 1949, 1958)
- AIC 1935 (prize)
- AIC 1946 (prize)
- WFNY, 1939
- La Pintura Contemporanea Norte America, 1941
- WMA, 1942
- AV 1942 (prize)
- American-British Goodwill Art Exhibition, 1944
- Pepsi Cola Art Competition, 1944 (winner)
- Tate Gallery: London 1946
- American Art Exhibition: Moscow, 1959
- Whitney Museum of American Art 1934–66 (Evergood Retrospective – 1967)
- Gallery Of Modern Art, Huntington, Hartford Museum, 1967
- ASL New York, 1967–68
- Smithsonian, 1968
- The WPA Art Of New York City Exhibit, Parsons School Of Design, 1977 (posthumous)

== Museum collections ==
This is a partial list of works by Evergood in museums.

- Vatican Museum (Strange Bird Contemplating the Doom of Man)
- Smithsonian (numerous)
- Tate Gallery, London (numerous)
- Boston Museum of Fine Arts (numerous)
- Dallas Museum of Art (Portrait of My Mother, 1927–1946)
- Los Angeles County Museum of Art (numerous)
- Art Institute of Chicago (numerous)
- Metropolitan Museum of Art (numerous)
- Museum of Modern Art, New York (numerous)
- Georgia Museum of Art (My Forebears Were Pioneers, 1939)
- Hunter Museum of American Art (Love on the Beach, 1937)
- Brooklyn Museum of Art (numerous)
- Hirshhorn Museum and Sculpture Garden
- Montclair Art Museum (Fascist Company, 1942)
- Orange County Museum of Art (Madonna of the Mines, 1932)
- Smart Museum of Art at the University of Chicago
- Terra Foundation for American Art (Passing Show, 1951)
- Tweed Museum of Art at the University of Minnesota, Duluth (Pittsburgh Family, 1944)
- University of Kentucky Art Museum (Self-Portrait, 1960)
- Whitney Museum of American Art (Lily and the Sparrows, 1939, The New Lazarus 1954)
- Jule Collins Smith Museum of Fine Art at Auburn University (Fascist Leader, 1946)
- Baltimore Museum of Art (No Sale, 1945, Flight of Fancy, 1947)
- Chrysler Museum of Art, Norfolk, VA (Music, 1933–1959)
- Worcester Art Museum, Worcester, MA (The Rubber Raft, 1945)
- Columbus Museum of Art, Columbus, OH (Spring, 1934)
- Reynolda House Museum of American Art, Winston-Salem, NC (Ancient Queen, 1960)
- Philbrook Museum of Art, Tulsa, OK (The Wedding, 1947)
