= Renske =

Dutch feminine given name

- Pronunciation: Dutch: [ˈrɛnskə]
- Gender: Feminine
- Language: Dutch

Other names
- Derived: Emerentius, Laurentius, Rein

Renske (Dutch pronunciation: [ˈrɛnskə]) is a Dutch feminine given name.

== Etymology ==
Renske was originally derived from the masculine name Emerentius or Laurentius or Rein.

== Popularity ==
In the Netherlands, the popularity of the name Renske peaked in 1984 with 170 newborns and again in 2008 with 228 newborns. In 2017, Renske was the first name of 7,466 women (0.1001%) and the middle name of 1,576 women (0.0213%) in the Netherlands; the municipality of Ferwerderadiel had the highest percentage of women named Renske (1.2474%).

== People named Renske ==
People with the first name Renske include:

- Renske van Beek (born 1989), Dutch para-snowboarder
- Renske Endel (born 1983), Dutch artistic gymnast
- Renske Leijten (born 1979), Dutch politician
- Renske Stoltz (born 1994), South African netball player
- Renske Vellinga (1974–1994), Dutch speed skater
