= Douglas Fry =

English Australian painter and illustrator

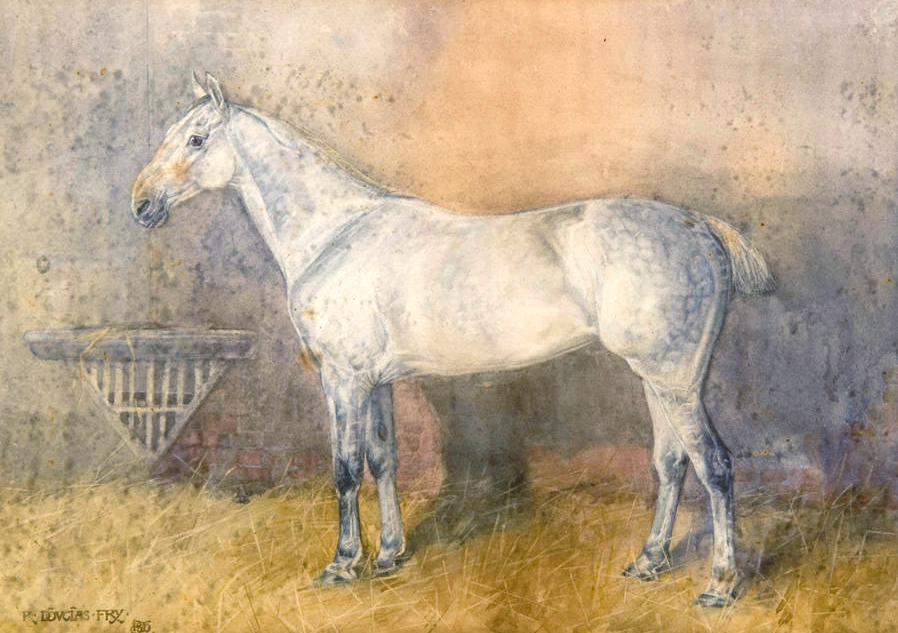
Robert Fry's A dappled grey horse in a stable, 1895, watercolour.

Robert Douglas Fry (September 1872 – 9 July 1911) was an English Australian painter and illustrator, known for his paintings of animals, and especially horses.

== Biography ==
Douglas Fry was born at Ipswich, Suffolk, England, son of Edward Fry, a corn and seed merchant, and his wife Annette née Ransome. His brother, Edward Ransome Fry, was also an artist, and his sister Constance Emily Fry married John Barlow Wood (1862–1949) a watercolour landscape artist.

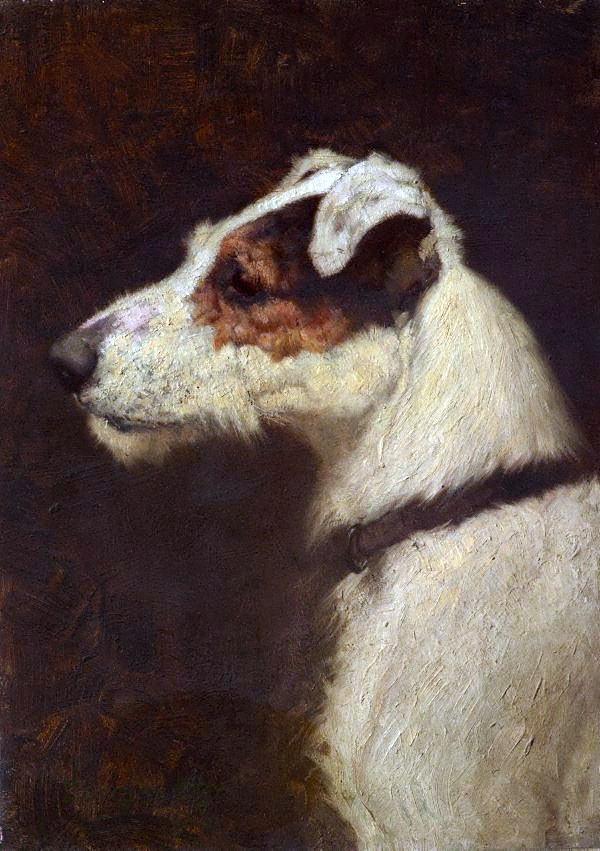
My best friend, 1910, oil on wood.

Fry was a keen hunter, described by a contemporary as a "tall, lean, monosyllbic Englishman who had an intensely conservative mind and a pronounced Oxford accent, and looked as if he had been poured into his riding pants and boots (which he always wore)". He was a keen horseman and is said to have taught Norman Lindsay to ride.
