= Lydia Abell =

Australian civilian and military nurse

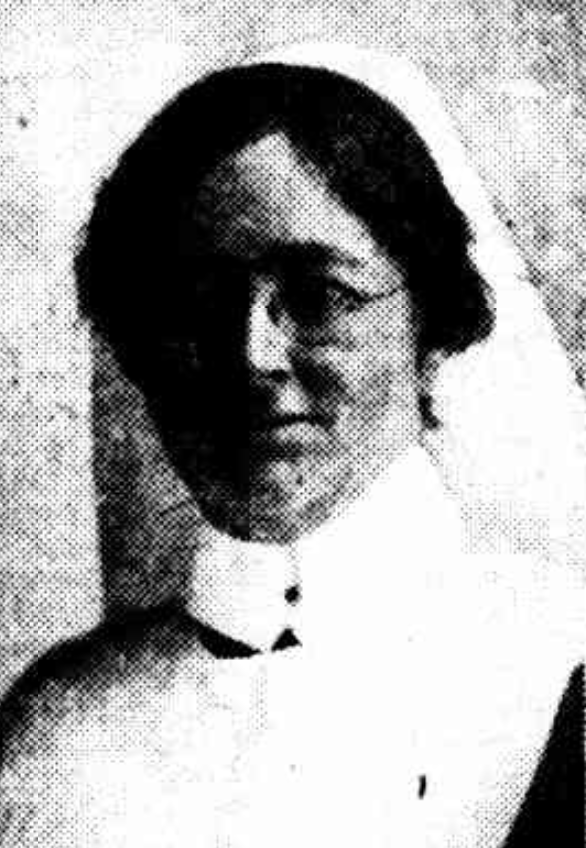
- Sister Lydia Abell in 1918
- Born: 13 June 1872; Newcastle, New South Wales
- Died: 21 July 1959 (aged 87); Gordon, New South Wales
- Military career
- Allegiance: United Kingdom
- Branch: Army Nursing Service
- Service years: 1915–1918
- Rank: Staff Nurse
- Unit: Queen Alexandra's Imperial Military Nursing Service
- Conflicts: First World War
- Awards: Associate Royal Red Cross

Lydia Abell, ARRC (13 June 1872 – 21 July 1959) was a civilian and military Australian nurse. She served in the First World War and was awarded the Associate Royal Red Cross for bravery during the evacuation of a field hospital that was under enemy bombardment on the Western Front.

== Early life ==
Abell was born on 13 June 1872 in Newcastle, New South Wales. She was the daughter of Elijah Abell and Margaret (née Brown) and grew up in the suburb of Wallsend.

== Nursing career ==
Abell was one of the founding members of the Australasian Trained Nurses Association and later had a desire to serve in the war as a nurse. Abell trained at Newcastle Hospital in 1898 and hence worked there. Before the war, she worked as a private nurse for Thomas Cook of Turanville, a famous cattle breeder. She then travelled to England to join the Queen Alexandra's Imperial Military Nursing Service Reserve (QAIMNSR).

For many years Abell continued her practice in Sydney, and was attached to the Phillip Street Nurses Home.

=== First World War ===
Abell made her own way to Europe, embarking on 18 September 1915 and arriving in Tilbury on 1 November. She volunteered her services to the military authorities and was assigned to Queen Alexandra’s Imperial Military Nursing Service Reserve. She was designated to a military hospital at Talence, in the southwest of France near Bordeaux, then was transferred to No. 32 Stationary Hospital in the north of France at Boulogne. She was then appointed for hospital work on one of the canals and was frequently under fire, and as a result she was moved to No. 14 General Stationary Hospital at Boulogne, and was moved again to serve duty at a casualty clearing station in the danger zone.

During her time spent on the casualty clearing stations her group had a hasty removal of the hospital, which was immediately behind the lines on the Western Front, owing to the allied army being pressed back by the Germans. Less than half an hour's warning was given to the staff to pack up as much of the equipment as possible and leave with the wounded patients. Hospitals in the vicinity were being deliberately bombed by German aircraft and she successfully re-established the station in a safer quarter. These were the actions that won her the Associate Royal Red Cross (ARRC) in 1918 Birthday Honours. She received her ARRC on 15 May 1919 by George V at the Buckingham Palace. The ARRC is awarded for exceptional service in military nursing.

Despite her harrowing experiences of war, Abell was quoted in the Sydney Morning Herald on 17 July 1918 as saying, "Much as I would like to come home, I do not wish to leave the boys or my work." She was discharged in April 1919, and returned to Australia on 25 September 1919.

== Later life ==
Abell never married, and died on 21 July 1959 at the Lady Gowrie Home in Gordon, New South Wales, aged 87 years. Abell is listed on the Wallsend War Memorial and was listed with the British Military Nursing Unit while others were listed with the Australian Army Nursing Service.
