= James Arthur Pollock =

James Arthur Pollock, FRS, (17 November 1865 – 24 May 1922) was an Irish-born physicist, active in Australia.

Born in Douglas, County Cork, Ireland and educated in England, in 1885 Pollock moved to Australia followed with by his family. In 1886, he was appointed second astronomical assistant to the New South Wales government astronomer, Henry Chamberlain Russell.

In 1889 Pollock became professor of physics at the University of Sydney. He studied atmospheric ions and vacuum technology amongst other areas.

In World War I, Pollock enlisted in the Engineering Corps and served with Edgeworth David. Pollock designed apparatus for use in tunnelling. This enabled destruction of German fortifications on the Messines and Wytschaete ridges in Belgium. He finished the war with the rank of major.

Pollock died in Sydney, he had no children. He was buried in Waverley Cemetery.
