= Renson =

Renson is a surname. Notable people with the surname include:

- Hugues Renson (born 1978), French politician
- Jordan Renson (born 1996), Belgian footballer
