= George Herbert Rogers =

Australian comedian

George Herbert Rogers (July 1820 – 12 February 1872), commonly known as G. H. Rogers, was an Australian stage actor.

Rogers was promoted corporal (and sergeant) and showing talent in regimental theatricals, had his discharge purchased by public subscription. Rogers was then employed as a civil officer in the convict department.
