= Dalvey, Elgin =

Place near Forres, Moray

Coordinates: 57°35′56″N 3°39′37″W

Dalvey is a place near to the town of Forres in Moray, Scotland. The name gave rise to the Baronets Grant of Dalvey, Elgin.

Dalvey Castle, also known as Grangehill Castle, was originally held by the Dunbars before passing to the Grants of Dalvey. The Grants were made Baronets in 1688. Sir James Grant was imprisoned for holding James VII in 1689. In about 1770, the Grants built a two-storey classical mansion on the site. The Grant of Dalvey line continues but they now live near Farr, Inverness-shire.
