= Sidney Cooke Limited =

Australian printing and manufacturing company

- Founded: 1872
- Defunct: 1999

Sidney Cooke Limited was a printing and manufacturing company based in Melbourne, Australia, from 1872 to 1999.

Their Head Office was based at 225-31 Queen Street, Melbourne.

The company's products were divided into divisions, but they were further divided into state-level branches/subsidiaries and foreign limited companies.

== History ==
In December 1981, the Canberra Times reported that the company's profits only had a 1 per cent rise. This small amount was attributed to high interest rates, decreasing building industry activity and industrial unrest.

=== Factories ===
In 1958, a new factory was erected in Brisbane, beginning production in March, and the company established subsidiary Sidney Cooke (Qld.) Pty. Ltd., to focus on activities in that state.

== Divisions ==
=== Printers' supplies division ===
This division offered printing machinery.

=== Printing inks, metal coatings, and adhesives division ===
This division produced inks, resins, varnishes and adhesives.

The company's oil-inks factory buildings in Melbourne and Sydney were sold in approximately 1961, and replaced by larger factories in Brooklyn, Melbourne and Mascot, New South Wales respectively. In November 1962, there was a fire at the Brooklyn flexographic and gravure factory, and it was later rebuilt and expanded. In 1966, they established a warehouse in Perth for the storage and display of printing machinery.

In approximately 1966, the organisation established three new plants: the Resin Complex (which worked in conjunction with the American-based Interchemical Corporation), the Angier Adhesives Plant (producing rubber-solvent adhesives) and the Tyton Adhesives Factory (based at Mascot, New South Wales).

In October 1971, the company set up a factory in Jakarta, Indonesia.

In July 1976, Sidney Cooke Ltd. announced its intention to acquire Gollin and Co. Ltd's graphics division.

In April 1978, as part of a proposal for a Joint Committee on unemployment in Australia, politician Mick Young highlighted Sidney Cooke Ltd as one of the firms within industry in the preceding five [sic] years to have been "...attracted solely to Indonesia." He stated that one of the reasons was Indonesia offering investment opportunities.

In 1988-89, Sidney Cooke's printing supplies business was purchased by SICPA (Switzerland).

==== Chemicals subsidiary ====
In November 1982, the Australian Government approved a merger between Australian Chemical Holdings Ltd. (engineering) and Sidney Cooke Ltd. The merger was considered in scope of foreign investment policy as the American-based Hercules Inc. had a controlling interest in Australian Chemical Holdings. The governmental press release from then-treasurer John Howard, noted Sidney Cooke's association with Adelaide Steamship Company Ltd. (also known as Adsteam). In March 1984, Sidney Cooke Ltd. was described as being a wholly owned subsidiary of Adsteam, and was sold by the company prior to March 1989. However, in an October 1989 issue of the Commonwealth of Australia Gazette, the Adelaide Steamship Company Limited's subsidiaries were listed as including Sidney Cooke Ltd, Sidney Cooke Investments Pty Ltd, Sidney Cooke Chemicals Pty Ltd (of Queen Street, Melbourne); and Sidney Cooke Chemicals, Sidney Cooke Graphics (of New Zealand).

In December 1997, notice was given that Sidney Cooke Chemicals Pty Ltd had convened and proposed to be wound up voluntarily, and in January 1999, PricewaterhouseCoopers advised that the company would be liquidated during the following month in Melbourne.

=== Wire and Metal Products division ===
This division produced and sold screws, roofing nails, rivets and fasteners.

In December 1946, John Dedman replied to Thomas Sheehy's question on notice in the Australian Parliament about the shortage of 1/2 inch blue upholsterers' tacks in South Australia. It was advised that Sidney Cooke Pty. Ltd., as one of the two Australian manufacturers, was lacking plate, pending the arrival of a large shipment.

In December 1961, with a view to expanding factory space, the company purchased land alongside their existing factory in Nicholson Street, East Brunswick.

==== Fasteners division (merged) ====
On 30 April 1963, they established a new subsidiary company, Sidney Cooke Fasteners Pty. Ltd.. This merged the various state-based wire and metal products subsidiaries into one Australian incorporation, spanning three Victorian factories, two N.S.W. factories and one South Australian factory. That same year, they built a more modern nail factory in East Brunswick. Some of the final liquidations of the subsidiaries were not completed until the financial year ending 30 April 1965, including companies in Victoria (F. Golds Nail Pty. Ltd, John R. Bell & Co. Pty. Ltd.), New South Wales (Sidney Cooke (United Nail) Pty. Ltd, Australian Wire Mills Pty. Ltd.) and South Australia (Sidney Cooke (Wire Products) Pty. Ltd.).

Products were created at factories based at Brunswick, Sydney, Adelaide and Suva, Fiji. The Fijian factory began production of nails and fencing materials such as barbed wire in April 1963, and was part of the Sidney Cooke (Fiji) Ltd. subsidiary.

On 3 July 1964, they formed a new metal fastenings manufacturing company, Sidney Cooke (N.Z.) Limited, in association with New Zealand's Consolidated Metal Industries Ltd.. This association was created to combat increased tariff restrictions in New Zealand.

In 1966, the company received a licence to produce the "Stronghold" Blind Rivets (Independent Nail Corporation) and "Taptite" Screws (Continental Screw Company). Another specialised product was the "Huck" fasteners (or, "Huck bolts").

In 1968, they purchased and transferred the stock of the Nail Division of A.E. & F. Tame Pty. Ltd to the Brunswick Factory.
