= Joe Slater (composer) =

Australian composer

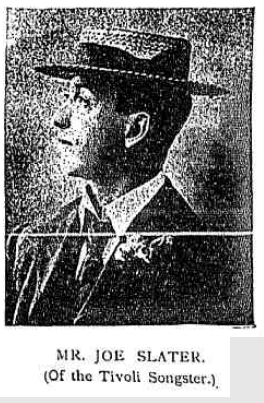
Joe Slater

John Joseph Slater (1872- 16 May 1926) was an Australian composer of popular and light classical works. He operated a music publishing company in Leichardt and blended his product with sheet music from other sources in Haymarket, Sydney. He wrote under several alias names and is commonly known as Felix Le Roy. Slater was active in variety theatre, particularly the company of Harry Rickards

His mature works include a series of favourably mentioned impressions for cornet, violin and piano trio - Bells of Peace, Spring Morning and Day Dreams. Slater's song A Faded Leaf of Shamrock sold six editions. Slater's more popular variety theatre pieces enjoyed larger reprints, especially One of these Days ran to a hundred and seventy five editions.

== Works ==
Seventy published titles are preserved in Australian libraries.

- 1916 Melody of Peace
- Spring Morning
- Day Dreams
- 1917 One of these days
- 1914 Somebody's calling the cooee call
- 1916 I'd Like to Call You Sweetheart
- 1913 Your eyes are the light of my world

== Recordings ==
- 2001 We'd fly the green above us, A bird with a broken wing (Heritage Singers)
- 2013 Why can't each nation be at peace?, Lonely (Wirripang)
