= Bertha Schroeder =

Salvation Army officer, social worker, probation officer

Bertha Schroeder (1872–1953) was a notable New Zealand officer of The Salvation Army, social worker, and probation officer. She was born in Australia in 1872.
