= Florence Anderson (trade unionist) =

First female trade union secretary in Victoria, Australia

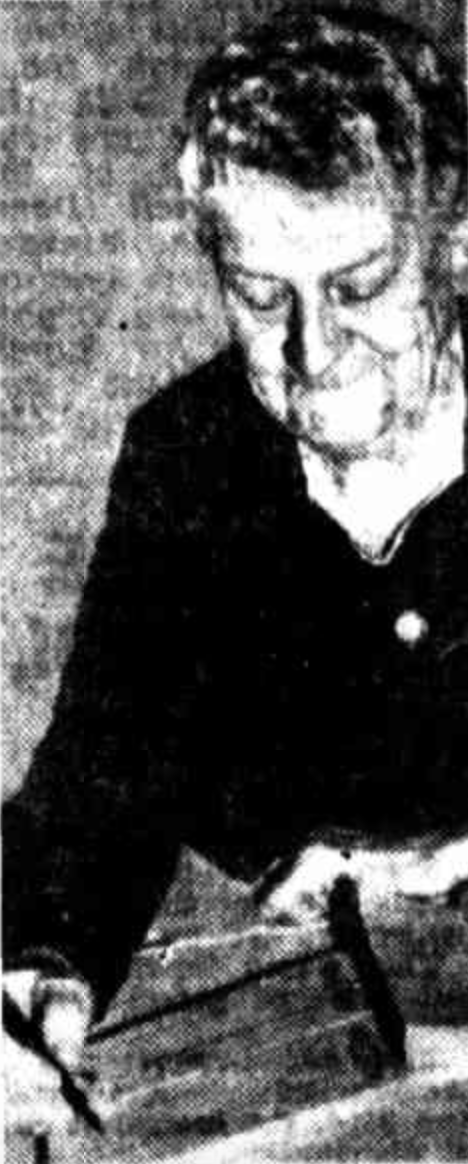
- Born: Florence Meyer; 17 February 1871; Bairnsdale, Victoria, Australia
- Died: 18 December 1949 (aged 78); Smith St, North Richmond
- Resting place: Burwood Cemetery, Victoria
- Occupation: Trade Unionist
- Known for: first female trade union secretary in Victoria, Australia

Florence Anderson (née Meyer; 1871–1949) was the first female trade union secretary in Victoria, Australia.

== Early life ==
Anderson was born Florence Meyer on 17 February 1871 in Bairnsdale, Victoria. She married John Anderson in 1911 and bore three children. After her husband became an invalid, Anderson took work as an office cleaner.

== Trade union career ==
According to the Biographical Register of the Australian Labour Movement 1788-1975, after her husband died, she "rebelled from expectation that cleaners take office towels home to launder". Anderson founded a union covering office cleaners in 1912 and lobbied, with the support of the Melbourne Trades Hall Council, for a wages board to set their pay and conditions. The first board fixed women's rates at 22 shillings and sixpence a week, against £2 2s for men doing comparable work.

She joined the Female Office Cleaners Union part-time from 1916 and later became a full-time worker in 1919. In 1920 she was made the chair of the Worker's Board with Henry E. Bessell and Richard Brooks. In 1921 her union amalgamated with the Miscellaneous Workers' Union, and Anderson was retained as a permanent official of the merged body.

=== Office cleaners' union, 1912–1930 ===
By 1928 Anderson had served seven years on the union's federal council and had recently become its Victorian vice-president; women office cleaners in Victoria were by then reportedly the best-paid unskilled workers in the Commonwealth, working a 44-hour week introduced in 1923. During a wages tribunal hearing in the mid-1920s, employers called an American caretaker to testify that women cleaners were already adequately paid. Anderson's public campaign against the testimony was enough to force the employers to have it struck from the record.

=== Victorian secretary of the Miscellaneous Workers' Union, 1930–1946 ===
Anderson was elected the Victorian Secretary of the Miscellaneous Workers Union (the "missos") in 1930, holding office until 1946. She was active in advocating for equal pay, in particular for cleaners who were often women and who worked long hours for little pay. In an interview for The Labor Call, Anderson called them "Workers of the Dawn, and Dusk too", and that,

If you could only stop to think how very necessary these women are. What a service they render. The whole of the big city buildings have to be cleansed every day. The work is of a domestic nature, and it is proved beyond a doubt that the women make the better cleaners, besides being cheaper than male labor. ... These poor women have been buoyed up in the past with the hope, when their children reached a working age, they could supplement the income and make the burden lighter for them. The tragedy of it all is that for the past two years not in one case out of ten can the children find employment, and the unfortunate mother discovers that today her purchasing power has rapidly declined.

She died at her home in Smith St, North Richmond on 20 December 1949, and was buried at Burwood Cemetery.
