= Miles Evergood =

Australian artist (1871–1939)

- Born: Myer Blashki; 10 January 1871; Melbourne, Australia
- Died: 21 March 1939 (aged 68); Melbourne, Australia
- Education: National Gallery School of Art
- Known for: Painting

Miles Evergood (10 January 1871 – 3 January 1939) was an Australian artist who achieved recognition in Europe and the United States, as well as his native country. He was the father of American artist Philip Evergood.

== Biography ==
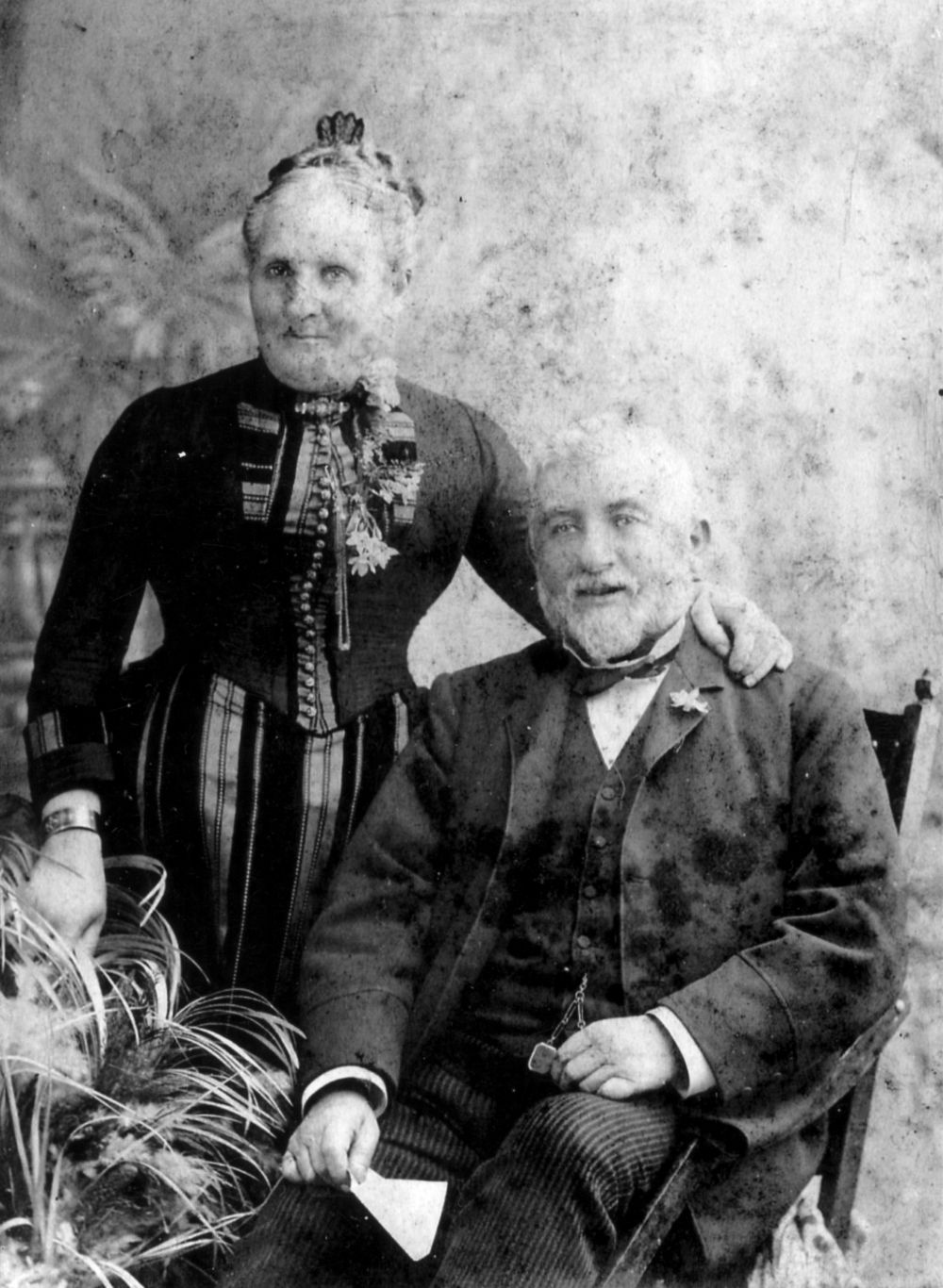
Evergood's parents, Phillip and Hannah Blashki, in 1892

Evergood was born Myer Blashki in Melbourne, eleventh child of Phillip Blashki, manufacturer of masonic regalia and jeweller, and his wife Hannah, née Immergut.

Evergood was educated at the Melbourne Hebrew Day School and Angel College, later crediting his ability to write and to argue to influential teachers there, especially Rev. Jacob Goldstein. Goldstein in 1908 wrote a front-page article about Evergood in the New York Hebrew Standard. He studied at the National Gallery School of Art under Frederick McCubbin and Bernard Hall between 1893 and 1895. His friends and colleagues were the group who exhibited the first recognisable style of Australian painting. They included Max Meldrum, George Coates, and James Quinn, who formed themselves into bohemian clubs to discuss contemporary concerns like socialism and the rights of the individual.

Evergood moved to the United States in 1898 together with fellow-artist Frank (Francis) McComas. He worked for the Hearst newspapers in San Francisco before moving on to New York City, where he exhibited and was subsequently invited to be a member of both the Salamgundi and Lotos Clubs. He went to London, where he married Flora Jane Perry, whom he had probably met in Sydney. The family moved to New York, where art critics Henri Pene du Bois and James Huneker wrote glowingly of his works. as did Hanna Astrup Larsen in the glossy journal International Studio. Miles and Flora had one child, named Philip Howard Francis Dixon Blashki (1901–1973). In 1910 Miles exhibited five paintings in the first exhibition of the Society of Independent Artists held in New York.

For about twenty years he regularly visited Europe. After returning with the family to live in England in 1910. In 1914 he had a landscape hung in the Salon (Paris). For eight years he exhibited with the International Society, at Burlington House, with the Society of Painters and 'Gravers and the New English Arts Club. He changed his name to Miles Evergood about 1914 in London, to enable his son Philip to get a commission in the British Navy. Then-Lord of the Admiralty, Winston Churchill wrote a handwritten reply to his query, suggesting that "Blashki" was not a suitable name for an officer in an Anglo Saxon navy.

Evergood returned to Australia in July 1931 and worked for eighteen months in Queensland and became a member of the Royal Queensland Art Society. He died of cancer in Melbourne on 3 January 1939. He left a de facto partner, Pauline Konitzer Romero, and his son, Philip Evergood, who became an artist living in America, substantially eclipsing the career of his father Miles.

== Gallery ==
Miles Evergood, Woman Reading pastel on paper

Miles Evergood, River Track and Wooden Footbridge, 1894

Miles Evergood, The Artist Painting

Miles Evergood, Figures under a tree

Miles Evergood, Boat in Canal Under the Shade

Miles Evergood, Figure in Landscape, 1907

Miles Evergood, Port Phillip Bay c. 1937

== Bibliography ==
- Serle, Percival (1949). "Evergood, Miles". Dictionary of Australian Biography. Sydney: Angus & Robertson.
