= Rense =

Rense is a surname. Notable people with the surname include:

- Arthur Rense (1917–1990), American sports journalist
- Jeff Rense, American conspiracy theorist and radio talk-show host
- Paige Rense (1929–2021), American magazine editor, wife of Arthur
- Rip Rense (born 1954), American music and film journalist and music producer
