= Madame Rens =

Baptised Marie Brigitte Joseph Coymans (19 January 1789 – 24 December 1873), and known as Josephine Rens, Madame Rens was an early and affluent New South Wales settler and businesswoman.

== Early life ==
Rens was born in Tournai, Belgium, daughter of Jean Joseph Coymans (c1759) and Marie Joseph Dussieu.

== Marriage and Family ==
Rens was married in Belgium on 29 May 1811 to Edouard Desire Constant Rens (born 29 June 1787 Parish of St Nicholas, City of Ghent, Dept of the Escaut). A son, Edouard Rens, was born on 1 January 1812, and a daughter, Jeanette, on 18 May 1815. Her husband, Edouard Rens, is presumed to have died circa 1815.

== Settlement in New South Wales ==
The widowed Madame Rens and her daughter, Jeanette, departed the Dutch colony of Batavia on the ship Phillip Dundas on 30 November 1826, arriving in Sydney on 30 January 1827. She had planned ahead for her survival in the colony, bringing with her enough capital to set up business and purchase property. She placed the following advertisement in The Australian newspaper of 10 February 1827:

"Madame Rens has the honour to acquaint the ladies and gentlemen of Sydney that she has just arrived with a choice assortment of fashionable articles from Paris. Evening dresses, ribbons, cambrics, imitation cashmere dresses, festoons, embroidered gauze, black crepe, artificial flowers, Brussels and French lace dresses, fine and coarse French laces, perfumery, toys, confectionery, coats, waistcoats and gloves. The goods will be exposed for sale on Monday, the 12th instant at Mrs Jones, George Street. Madame Rens flatters herself that her mode of conducting business will secure her the confidence of those who may honour her with their demands."

Two months later, an advertisement in the Sydney Gazette published on Wednesday, 25 April 1827 read:

MADAME RENS has the Honour to inform the Ladies of Sydney and its Environs, that she has now on SALE very elegant BALL DRESSES, which she can offer at very moderate Prices. Madame Rens has also a superb Robe of Brussels Lace, (warranted) which she Offers for a RAFFLE. 50 Tickets at £5 each. The Robe cost £200.

In the 1828 census, Rens was listed as "Coymanos Vidonia Rens" and described herself as a milliner.

In her application for naturalisation in 1831, she stated that she had brought with her property amounting to 6000 pounds sterling, and it is known that by 10 June 1827 she had bought an allotment on the corner of George and what is now Bridge Street, Sydney.

== The Enchantress Shipwreck ==
On Tuesday, 16 April 1833, Madame Rens and her daughter set sail for London on the ship Edward Lombe. They returned in 1835 accompanied by her son, Edward, travelling from England on the barque Enchantress from London for Hobart Town and Sydney. The ship hit rocks and sank off the south-west coast of Bruny Island in the D'Entrecasteaux Channel, Tasmania at 10:00 pm on Friday, 17 July 1835. 16 of the crew and one steerage passenger were lost. Madame, Mr and Miss Rens were listed among the passengers saved. They arrived back in Sydney on the ship Medway in September 1835.

== Travel to California and San Francisco ==
In December 1850, Madame Rens again left New South Wales, for France, but instead proceeded to California and San Francisco. From San Francisco, she wrote to the Consulate of the United States in Sydney for a testimonial in her favour, which was provided in March 1852.

== Later years ==
By 1858, Madame Rens was residing again in Sydney. From 1863 until her death in December 1873, she lived in Charles Street, Newtown. Both her son and daughter had predeceased her and in a letter written to her former son-in-law only months before her death, she claims to have been allied to a noble French family and that Le Comte de Grammont was her cousin.

== Portrayal in Screen Australia Series Rogue Nation 2009 ==
Madame Rens was portrayed in Episode 2 Rights of Passage of Screen Australia series Rogue Nation.

== See also ==
- Shipwrecks of Tasmania
