= John Hampton =

Governor of Western Australia

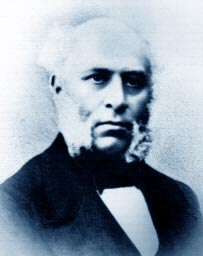
John Stephen Hampton

John Stephen Hampton (c. 1806 – 1 December 1869) was Governor of Western Australia from 1862 to 1868.

== Early life ==
Little is known of John Hampton's early life. His death certificate states that he was born in 1810, but other evidence suggests 1806 or perhaps 1807; these latter figures are considered more likely. He undertook medical studies at Edinburgh, graduating with a diploma of medicine in September 1828. He was appointed an assistant naval surgeon with Britannia, but shortly afterwards was transferred to Sphinx. In 1832 he was attached to the Plymouth dockyards, where he worked to prevent the spread of cholera. He later served on Savage, Firebrand and finally Portland. In December 1834 he was promoted to full surgeon, and in March 1843 became surgeon-superintendent. Between 1841 and 1845, Hampton was surgeon-superintendent on a series of convict ships to Van Diemen's Land: Mexborough, Constant and Sir George Seymour.

== Comptroller General of Convicts in Tasmania ==
Having served well on a number of convict ships to Van Diemen's Land, Hampton was appointed Comptroller-General of Convicts in Van Diemen's Land in May 1846. He arrived at the colony on 27 October 1846. During his time in the office, allegations of inhumanity and corruption were frequently published in the press. In 1855, the Tasmanian Legislative Council established a select committee to look into the allegations. Hampton was summonsed to appear in the House for questioning, but refused. The House then found him guilty of contempt and issued a warrant for his arrest, but both the police magistrate and the local sheriff refused to help arrest him. Hampton eventually wrote a letter to the Council, in which he agreed to remain under house arrest until the legality of the warrant had been established. The Council refused to accept this proposal, but a political crisis was averted when the Governor of Tasmania Fox Young appointed a judicial tribunal to pronounce on the legality of the warrant, then prorogued parliament.

While the tribunal was still sitting, Hampton obtained a leave of absence on grounds of ill health, and left the colony. The tribunal eventually returned a decision that the warrant was not legal. The Tasmanian Legislative Council then appealed to the Privy Council's judicial committee, who again found in Hampton's favour. Eventually the inquiry proceeded with evidence from Hampton. The final report presented findings that Hampton had engaged in corrupt practices, including the employment of convict labour for personal profit.

Not much is known of the next five years of Hampton's life. He took no government service, spending some of the time in Toronto, Ontario, Canada on "urgent private affairs".

== Governor of Western Australia ==
In 1861, Hampton was appointed Governor of Western Australia. He arrived in the colony the following year, and immediately took far more direct control of Western Australia's convict establishment than had his predecessors. He imposed a far stricter regime than in the past, with increased use of flogging as a punishment, and the reintroduction of solitary confinement. Hampton constantly quarrelled with the Comptroller General of Convicts and in 1866 he had him removed. Hampton then appointed his son George to act in the position. George Hampton had no particular qualifications for the position, and already held a number of other salaried positions. This "unusually blatant act of nepotism" was extremely unpopular within the colony, and was compounded when Hampton approved his son a living allowance, to which he was entitled but did not need since he lived in Government House. Thereafter, both Hamptons became figures of public hostility and ridicule within the colony.

The Government of Western Australia was in acute debt when Hampton took over as governor. He immediately imposed strict cost-cutting measures, including using convict labour instead of contract labour whenever possible. Within a year the colony had recovered from its financial problems, and a few years later was on a firm financial footing. His sound financial management endeared him to the Colonial Office, and went some way to alleviating his unpopular public image. His vigorous public works program also met with strong approval by the colonists.

It is not known whether Hampton sought a second term as governor.

In 1868 George Hampton married the daughter of the photographer Alfred Stone. (Note: The photographer's daughter Fanny Stone married the Governor's son George Hampton 13 June 1868 and moved into Government House until the Hampton family left W.A. 14 November 1868 - library text with the photograph.)

On the expiry of his term in November 1868, he returned to England on Emily Smith. His wife died shortly after their arrival in England, and Hampton himself lived only until 1 December 1869.

== Legacy ==
John Hampton has Hampton Park Primary School and Hampton Senior High School named after him.

== Sources ==
- de Garis, B. K. (1981). "Political tutelage 1829–1890". In Stannage, Charles Thomas (ed.). A New History of Western Australia. Nedlands: UWA Publishing. ISBN 0-85564-181-9. LCCN 82101009. OCLC 963830667. OL 3517729M. Wikidata Q125995168.
- Stone, Alfred Hawes (1868). George and Fanny Hampton in Government House gardens, Perth, 2 November 1868.

Preceded by Sir Arthur Kennedy	Governor of Western Australia; 1862–1868	Succeeded by Sir Benjamin Pine
