= John Manners-Sutton, 3rd Viscount Canterbury =

British Tory politician and colonial administrator

The Right Honourable The Viscount Canterbury GCMG KCB
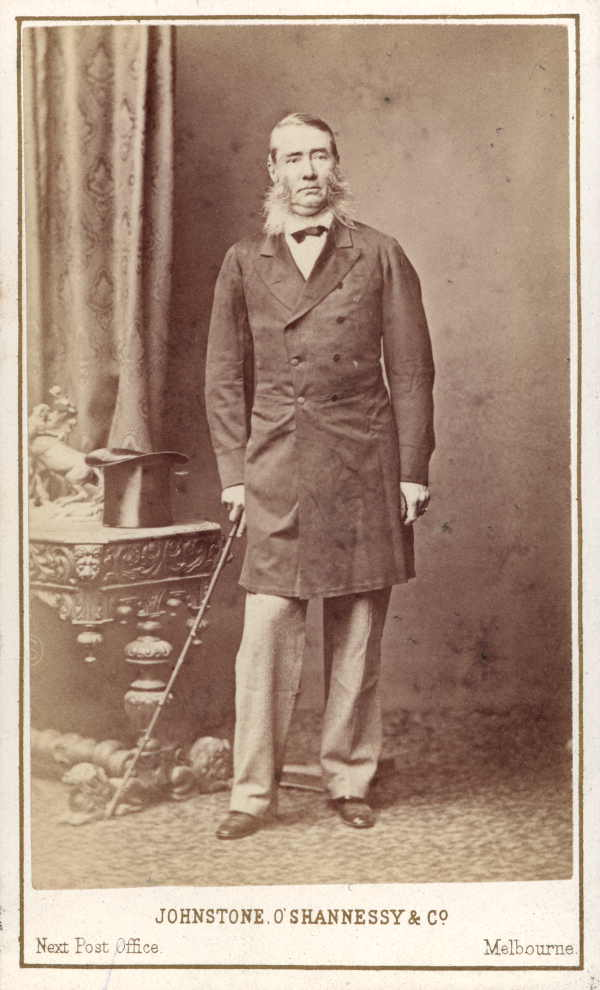
- Lord Canterbury as Governor of Victoria.

Governor of Trinidad
- In office 1864–1866
- Monarch: Queen Victoria
- Preceded by: Robert William Keate
- Succeeded by: Arthur Hamilton-Gordon

Governor of Victoria
- In office 1866–1873
- Monarch: Victoria
- Preceded by: Sir Charles Henry Darling
- Succeeded by: Sir George Bowen

Personal details
- Born: 27 May 1814 Downing Street, London
- Died: 24 June 1877 (aged 63) Queensberry Place, Kensington, London
- Party: Conservative
- Spouse: Georgiana Tompson (m. 1838)
- Children: 7
- Parent: Charles Manners-Sutton, 1st Viscount Canterbury (father)
- Education: Trinity College, Cambridge

John Henry Thomas Manners-Sutton, 3rd Viscount Canterbury GCMG KCB (27 May 1814 – 24 June 1877), styled The Hon. John Manners-Sutton between 1814 and 1866 and Sir John Manners-Sutton between 1866 and 1869, was a British Tory politician and colonial administrator.

== Background and education ==
A member of the Manners family headed by the Duke of Rutland, Manners-Sutton was born at Downing Street, London, the second and youngest son of Charles Manners-Sutton, 1st Viscount Canterbury, Speaker of the House of Commons, by his first wife Lucy, daughter of John Denison. His mother died when he was one year old. He was educated at Eton and Trinity College, Cambridge, graduating with an MA in 1835. In his youth he played for Cambridge University Cricket Club and Marylebone Cricket Club.

== Political career ==
Manners-Sutton was returned to Parliament for Cambridge in September 1839. However, in April 1840 his election was declared void. He was returned for the same constituency in 1841 and held it until 1847. He served as Under-Secretary of State for the Home Department from 1841 to 1846 in Sir Robert Peel's second administration.

== Colonial governor ==
In 1854 Manners-Sutton was appointed Lieutenant Governor of New Brunswick, a post he held until 1861. He later served as Governor of Trinidad from 1864 to 1866 and as Governor of Victoria from 1866 to 1873. He was appointed a Knight Commander of the Order of the Bath in 1866 and a Knight Grand Cross of the Order of St Michael and St George in 1873. In 1869 he succeeded in the viscountcy of Canterbury on the death of his unmarried elder brother.

== Family ==
He married, on 5 July 1838, Georgiana, youngest daughter of Charles Tompson of Witchingham Hall, Norfolk, by whom he had five sons, and two daughters:

- Henry Charles, who succeeded him as Viscount Canterbury;
- Graham Edward Henry, who died 30 May 1888;
- George Kett Henry, who died 2 March 1865;
- John Gurney Henry,
- Robert Henry, who was called to the bar at the Inner Temple on 7 May 1879
- Anna Maria Georgiana, who married, on 25 August 1868, Charles Edward Bright, C.M.G., of Toorak, Australia;
- Mabel Georgiana.

== Legacy ==
Sutton street in the southern Ballarat suburb of Redan is named after him.

Parliament of the United Kingdom
Preceded by George Pryme; Thomas Spring Rice	Member of Parliament for Cambridge; 1839–1840; With: George Pryme	Succeeded by George Pryme; Sir Alexander Grant, Bt
Preceded by George Pryme; Sir Alexander Grant, Bt	Member of Parliament for Cambridge; 1841–1847; With: Sir Alexander Grant, Bt 1841–1843; Fitzroy Kelly 1843–1847	Succeeded by Robert Adair; William Campbell
Political offices
Preceded by Lord Seymour	Under-Secretary of State for the Home Department; 1841–1846	Succeeded by Sir William Somerville, Bt
Government offices
Preceded by Sir Edmund Walker Head, Bt	Lieutenant Governor of New Brunswick; 1854–1861	Succeeded by Arthur Hamilton-Gordon
Preceded by Robert William Keate	Governor of Trinidad; 1864–1866	Succeeded by Arthur Hamilton-Gordon
Preceded by Sir Charles Henry Darling	Governor of Victoria; 1866–1873	Succeeded by Sir George Bowen
Peerage of the United Kingdom
Preceded by Charles Manners-Sutton	Viscount Canterbury; 1869–1877	Succeeded by Henry Manners-Sutton
