= Premiers and chief ministers of the Australian states and territories =

State heads of government

The premiers and chief ministers of the Australian states and territories are the heads of the executive governments in the six states and two self-governing territories of Australia. They perform the same function at the state and territory level as the Prime Minister of Australia performs at the national level. The King of Australia and the state governors are the formal repositories of executive power; however, in practice they act only on the advice of state premiers and ministers except in extreme circumstances, such as a constitutional crisis.

== Background ==
Each of the Australian states is governed under the Westminster system of parliamentary government. Each state has an elected legislature. Following a general election, the state governor appoints as premier the member of the lower house of the state legislature who can command a simple majority of votes on the floor of the house. The governor is the head of state, and acts only on the advice of the head of government - the premier. The premier must resign the commission to the governor for losing the confidence of the legislative assembly, either because their party is defeated at a general election or losing a vote of confidence in the house. (Premiers may also resign for other reasons, such as losing the confidence of their own party).

The Australian states were founded as British colonies, and executive power was held by a governor (or sometimes a lieutenant-governor) appointed by the British government (see Governors of the Australian states). From the 1820s the power of the governors was gradually transferred to legislative bodies, at first appointed, later partly elected, and finally fully elected. Victoria gained full responsible parliamentary government in 1855, New South Wales, South Australia and Tasmania in 1856, Queensland in 1859 and Western Australia (owing to its much smaller population) in 1890.

Until the rise of the Australian Labor Party in the 1890s, the Australian colonies did not have formal party systems, although many colonial politicians called themselves Liberals or Conservatives. Ministries were usually formed on the basis of personal or factional loyalties, and rose and fell with great frequency as loyalties changed. Colonial politics were commonly regarded as parochial, corrupt and cynical, and in many cases they were. Victorian Premier James Munro, for example, fled the colony to escape his creditors in 1890, and Queensland Premier Sir Thomas McIlwraith was notoriously corrupt.

The rise of Labor forced the colonies to move towards a two-party system of Labor versus non-Labor, although state politics remained more personalised and less ideological than national politics for many years. The first minority Labor government was formed by Anderson Dawson in Queensland in 1899, and the first majority Labor government was led by James McGowen in New South Wales in 1910. Since about 1910 state politics have followed much the same party pattern as Australian national politics (see Politics of Australia).

Since 1952, every premier of every state has been a member of the Australian Labor Party, the Liberal Party of Australia, or the National Party of Australia (until 1973, the Liberal Party was known as the Liberal and Country League in South Australia; the Country Liberal Party is the Northern Territory branch of the Liberal and National Parties; and the Liberal National Party has been the Queensland branch of the same two parties since 2008).

Although the legislative powers of the states are defined in the Constitution, the real power of the Australian premiers has been declining steadily ever since Federation in 1901, as the power and responsibility of the national government has expanded at the expense of the states. The most important transfer of power came in 1943, when in the interests of national unity during World War II the states gave up their power to levy their own income taxes to the Commonwealth. Since then the states' finances have essentially been controlled by the Commonwealth.

=== Relations between the premiers and other levels of government ===
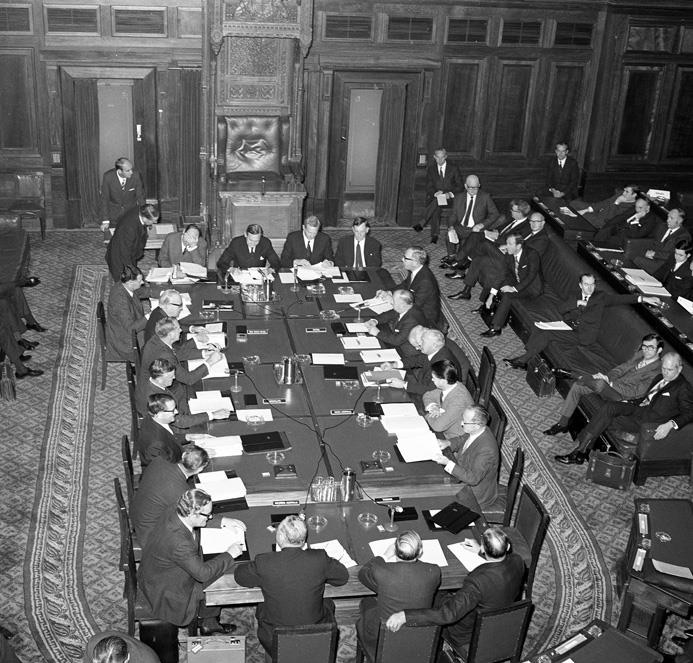
1970 Premier's Conference

For many decades, the premiers met with each other and the prime minister at Premiers' Conferences. From 1992 to 2020, such meetings occurred through the Council of Australian Governments (COAG), which also includes the chief ministers of the territories and a representative of local government. Since 2020, the National Cabinet allows meetings between the prime minister, state premiers and chief ministers of the territories, however local government representation has been removed.

On 21 July 2006, South Australian premier Mike Rann was appointed chairman of a new Council for the Australian Federation, a council which aims to improve state-federal ties.

== Timeline ==
Between 6 March 2002 (when Mike Rann (Labor) succeeded Rob Kerin (Liberal) as Premier of South Australia) and 23 September 2008, when Colin Barnett succeeded Alan Carpenter as Premier of Western Australia, there were Labor Premiers in all six of the Australian states (and Chief Ministers in both territories); this was only the second time a party or coalition has ever achieved this. A comparable feat was achieved by the Coalition between 26 May 1969 (when the Liberals' Angus Bethune succeeded Labor's Eric Reece as Premier of Tasmania) and 2 June 1970 (when the Liberals' Steele Hall was succeeded by Labor's Don Dunstan as Premier of South Australia).

== Current premiers of the states ==
Premiers by party affiliation by state and territory

Map showing the states of Australia and their governing political parties:

Labor
Liberal (includes the Country Liberal and Liberal National parties)

State	Portrait	Name	Term start	Current duration	Party	Title	State government
New South Wales		Chris Minns	28 March 2023	3 years, 195 days	Labor	Premier	New South Wales; Government
Victoria		Ben Carroll	28 July 2026	73 days	Labor	Premier	Victoria State Government
Queensland		David Crisafulli	28 October 2024	1 year, 346 days	Liberal National	Premier	Premiership of David Crisafulli
Western Australia		Roger Cook	8 June 2023	3 years, 123 days	Labor	Premier	Western Australia; Government
South Australia		Peter Malinauskas	21 March 2022	4 years, 202 days	Labor	Premier	South Australia; Government
Tasmania		Jeremy Rockliff	8 April 2022	4 years, 184 days	Liberal	Premier	Premiership of Jeremy Rockliff

== Current chief ministers of the territories ==
Territory	Portrait	Name	Term start	Current duration	Party	Title	Territory government
Australian; Capital Territory		Andrew Barr	11 December 2014	11 years, 302 days	Labor	Chief Minister	Australian Capital Territory; Government
Northern Territory		Lia Finocchiaro	28 August 2024	2 years, 42 days	Country Liberal	Chief Minister	Chief ministership of Lia Finocchiaro

== Female heads of government ==
With the exception of South Australia, every state and territory of Australia has had a female head of government, all but three of whom have represented the Australian Labor Party. They are:

- Australian Capital Territory:
  - Rosemary Follett 1989, 1991–1995 (first territory and first jurisdiction)
  - Kate Carnell 1995–2000
  - Katy Gallagher 2011–2014
- Western Australia:
  - Carmen Lawrence 1990–1993 (first state)
- Victoria:
  - Joan Kirner 1990–1992
  - Jacinta Allan 2023–2026
- Northern Territory:
  - Clare Martin 2001–2007
  - Natasha Fyles 2022–2023
  - Eva Lawler 2023–2024
  - Lia Finocchiaro 2024–present
- Queensland:
  - Anna Bligh 2007–2012
  - Annastacia Palaszczuk 2015–2023
- New South Wales:
  - Kristina Keneally 2009–2011
  - Gladys Berejiklian 2017–2021
- Tasmania:
  - Lara Giddings 2011–2014

Of all Australian States (and Commonwealth), Annastacia Palaszczuk was the first and still only female leader to lead a party from Opposition to Government. Of the state leaders, all but Palaszczuk succeeded male premiers of their own party who had resigned mid-term; in three cases (Lawrence, Kirner and Keneally), their predecessors' resignations occurred after losing the support of their parliamentary colleagues; in Allan's case, her predecessor, Daniel Andrews, resigned only ten months after being re-elected in November 2022. The governments led by Lawrence, Kirner, Keneally and Giddings were defeated at the subsequent elections.

Anna Bligh, Annastacia Palaszczuk and Gladys Berejiklian are the only women who have received a popular mandate as premier of an Australian state (21 March 2009, 31 January 2015 and 23 March 2019).

Women have also been elected to the almost-equivalent posts of chief ministers of the Australian Capital Territory (ACT) and the Northern Territory (NT). Rosemary Follett (Labor) was elected as the inaugural Chief Minister of the ACT in 1989, nine months before any woman became premier of a state. Kate Carnell (Liberal), and Clare Martin (Labor) also received popular mandates as chief ministers of the ACT and the NT respectively. Clare Martin was the only one of these three women to lead a majority government.

Of all female premiers and chief ministers, only Clare Martin and Annastacia Palaszczuk have gained re-election after successfully completing a term from election to election. Rosemary Follett did win two consecutive elections, but had an interrupted term of service from 5 December 1989 (when a successful motion of no confidence passed by establishing a new government led by Trevor Kaine) to 6 June 1991 (when another motion of no confidence was passed, this time against Trevor Kaine, re-establishing Follett as chief minister).

== See also ==
- List of Australian heads of government by time in office
- Premier (Canada)
