= Drew Robinson & Company building =

Heritage listed building in Albany, Western Australia

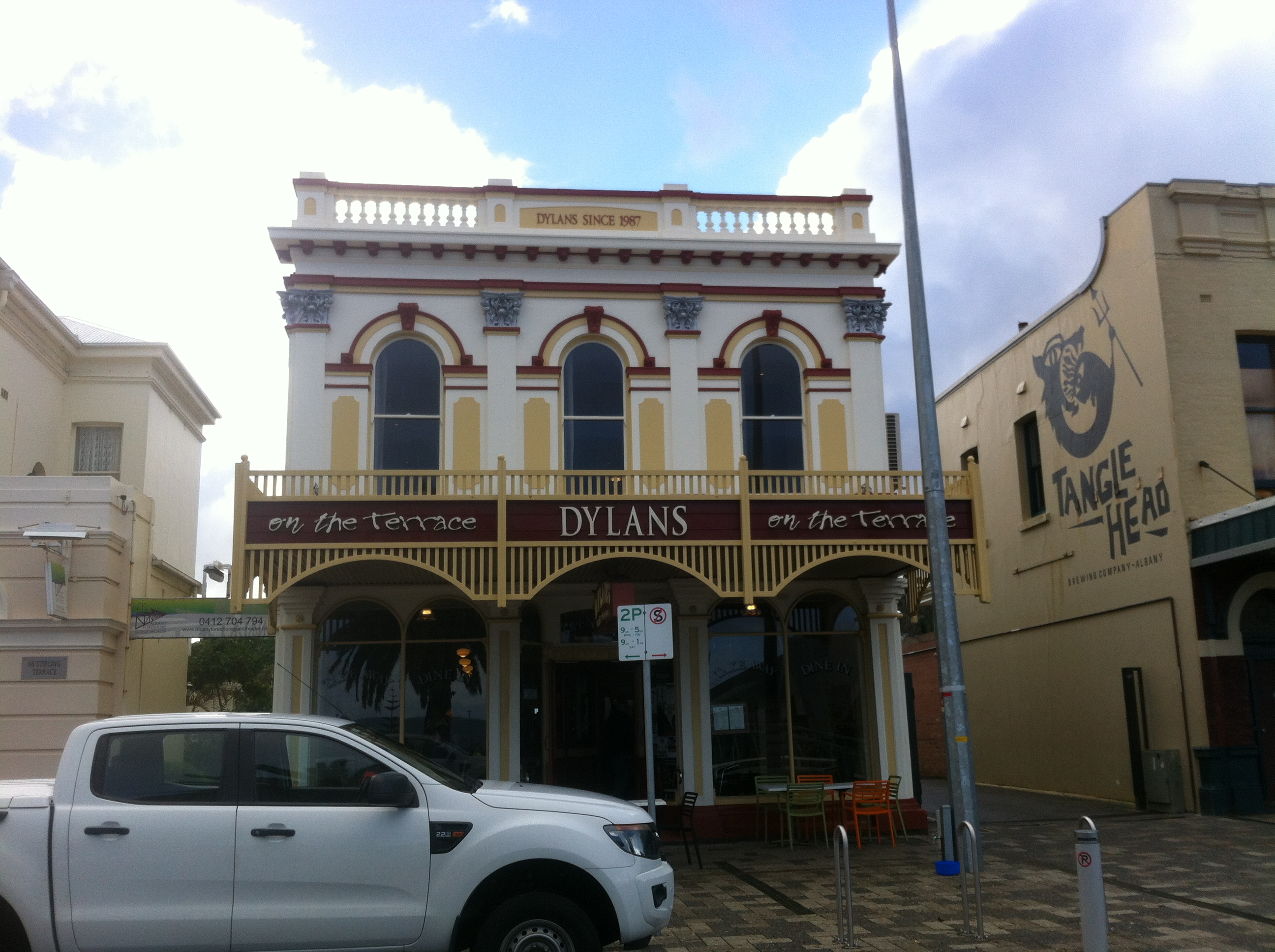
- Dylan's on the Terrace 2016
- Interactive map of the Drew Robinson & Company building area

General information
- Type: Heritage listed building
- Location: Albany, Western Australia
- Coordinates: 35.0268°S 117.8857°E

Western Australia Heritage Register
- Type: State Registered Place
- Designated: 7 December 2007
- Part of: Stirling Terrace Precinct, Albany (14922)
- Reference no.: 52

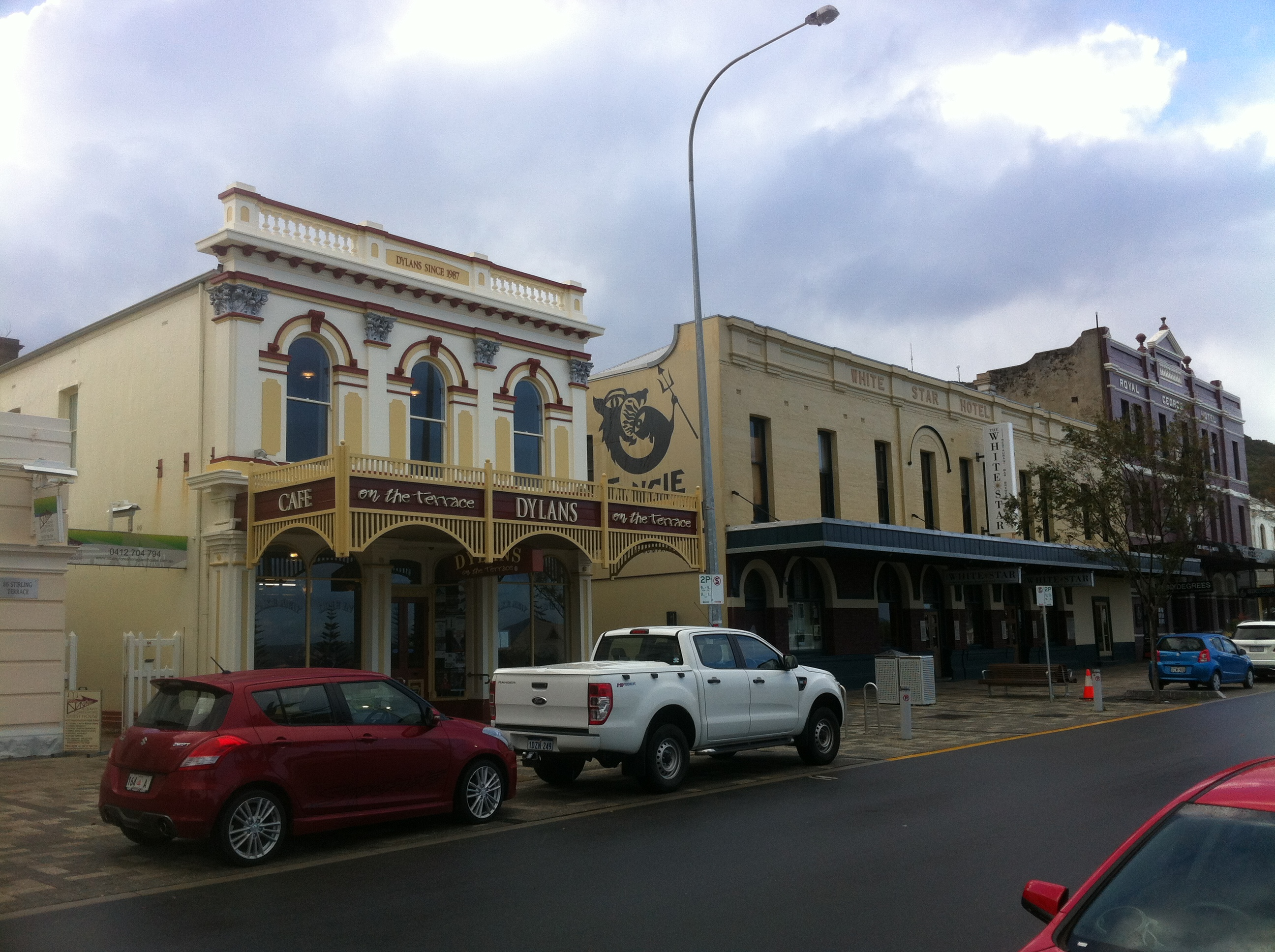
Drew Robinson & Co building and the White Star Hotel

Drew Robinson & Company building, also known as the Albany Light Opera Company building and Dylan's on the Terrace, is a heritage listed building located on Stirling Terrace overlooking Princess Royal Harbour in Albany in the Great Southern region of Western Australia.

The building was constructed in 1880 and was originally owned by the McKail family. John McKail, a merchant and (briefly) member of parliament, had operated from a warehouse and woolstore on the site until his death in 1871. His family, trading as John McKail & Co., has the current building erected in 1880.

McKail also built a wool store behind the building facing the opposite direction with the frontage along Frederick Street. In 1888, following McKail's death, the business and building were acquired by Charles Drew and John Robinson who had recently formed Drew, Robinson & Co.

By 1902 the building was being used to house a cafe, the Central Coffee Palace. A fire, which resulted in damage estimated at £6,000, occurred later the same year. It was occupied by John Zervoothakis who was not injured. The neighbouring building, the White Star Hotel, was preserved only by the constant application of wet blankets to the woodwork. The fire gutted the building leaving only the facade and the side walls standing. It was rebuilt in 1903 and was used as a tobacconist, hairdresser, hostel and cafe.

Thomas Wardle, owner of Tom the Cheap grocery chain, acquired the building in 1968 along with other with plans to demolish them and build a shopping complex. The building was also being used by the Albany Light Opera Company was housed in the building in the late 1970s before the building became empty and derelict.

Acquired in 1980 by Gwen and Morris Blake the building was extensively restored and opened as a bookshop. The building was converted for use as a restaurant in 1987, initially known as Dylan's on the Terrace and now called Dylan's Cafe and Restaurant.

A grant of A$57,600 was awarded to the owners of the building in 2015 for restoration work including painting the façade and verandah and installing a new verandah roof.

== See also ==
- List of places on the State Register of Heritage Places in the City of Albany
