= Argyle House, Albany =

Heritage listed building in Albany, Western Australia

Argyle House
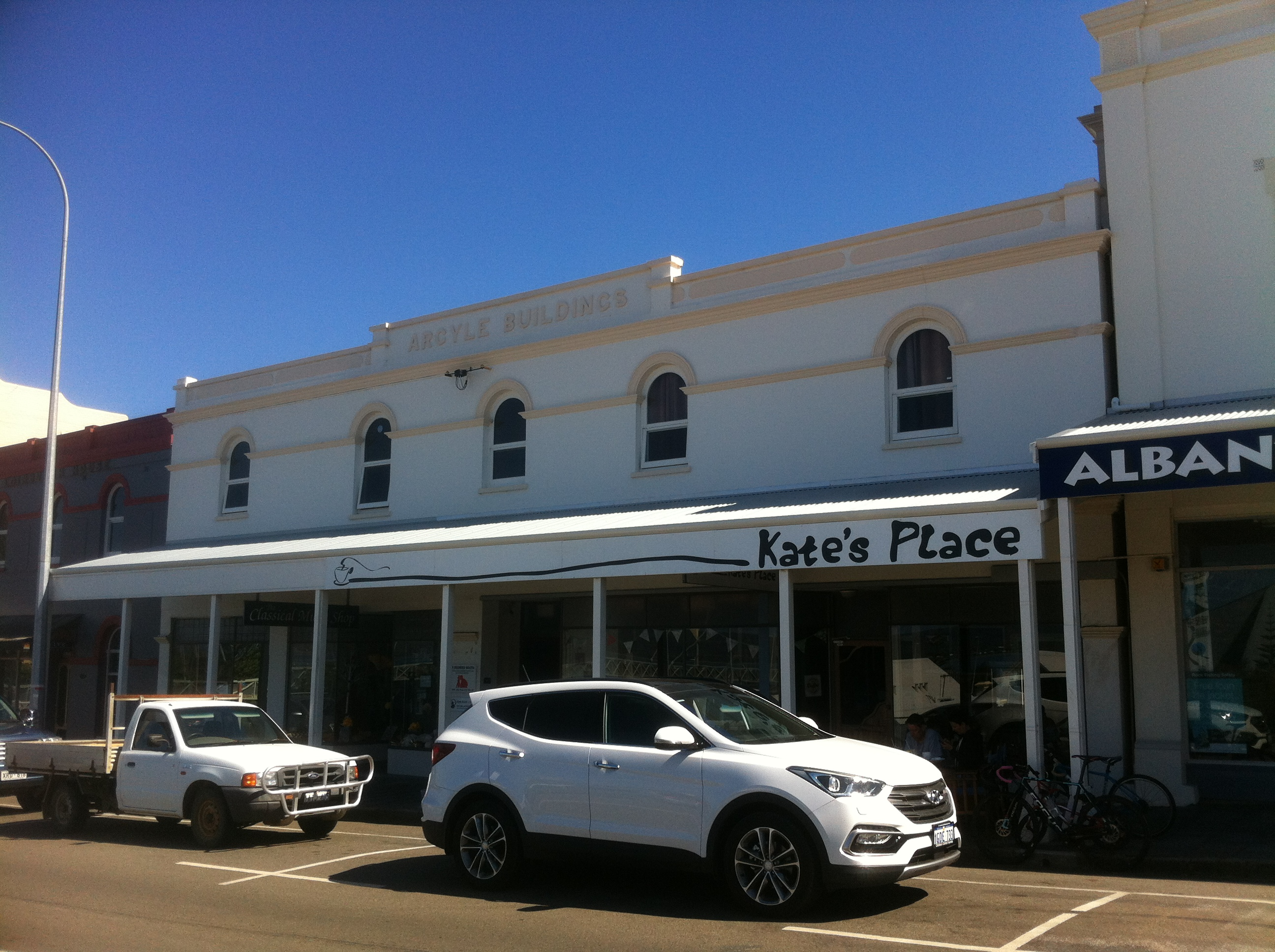
- Argyle Buildings in 2017
- Interactive map of the Argyle House area

General information
- Location: 42-50, Stirling Terrace, Albany, Western Australia
- Coordinates: 35.02723°S 117.8868°E
- Completed: 1890s

Western Australia Heritage Register
- Type: State Registered Place
- Designated: 7 December 2007
- Part of: Stirling Terrace Precinct, Albany (14922)
- Reference no.: 59

Arglye House is a heritage listed building located at 42-50 Stirling Terrace overlooking Princess Royal Harbour in Albany in the Great Southern region of Western Australia.

The two-storey building has a rendered brick façade with a hipped corrugated iron roof only just above a parapet wall. A central raised pediment has a bas-relief with the words "Argyle House" inscribed. A single line of arched windows are a feature across the second storey of the building. It was constructed in the 1890s in a style matching the adjacent Edinburgh and Glasgow Houses. The Adelaide Steamship Company occupied the building in 1897, and in 1901 the owner was Elizabeth Dunn. It was awarded a grant of A$28,865 in 2015 to assist with painting, installing a new verandah and windows, and general conservation work.

== See also ==
- List of places on the State Register of Heritage Places in the City of Albany
