= Everett Building =

Everett Building may refer to:

- Everett Building (Huntsville, Alabama)
- Everett Building (Manhattan)
- Everett Buildings (Albany, Western Australia)
