= List of State Register of Heritage Places in the City of Albany =

List of heritage places in Western Australia

The State Register of Heritage Places is maintained by the Heritage Council of Western Australia. As of 2026, 473 places are heritage-listed in the City of Albany, of which 94 are on the State Register of Heritage Places.

== List ==
The Western Australian State Register of Heritage Places, as of 2026, lists the following 94 state registered places within the City of Albany:

Place name	Place #	Street number	Street name	Suburb or town	Co-ordinates	Notes & former names	Photo
St Joseph's Convent (former)	1	142-152	Aberdeen Street	Albany	35.021129°S 117.885320°E	St Joseph's School for Young Ladies, Community Centre	
St Joseph's Church, Bell & Belltower	2	120-140	Aberdeen Street	Albany	35.02166°S 117.885417°E		
The Albany Club	3	23	Aberdeen Street	Albany	35.025141°S 117.884909°E	Aberdeen House, Residence (former)	
Albany State School Group (former)	16	117-121	Serpentine Road	Albany	35.02267°S 117.882631°E	Albany State School, Albany Infants School, Educational Resources Centre, Albany Primary School	
Camfield House	17	172	Serpentine Road	Albany	35.02°S 117.878234°E	Annesfield	
Patrick Taylor Cottage	19	37-39	Duke Street	Albany	35.027006°S 117.881087°E	Albany Historical Society Folk Museum	
Wollaston House	20	54	Duke Street	Albany	35.026651°S 117.879917°E		
Wesley Church Group, Albany	21	12	Duke Street	Albany	35.02615°S 117.88086°E	Methodist Church	
Albany Masonic Hall	23	58-60	Spencer Street	Albany	35.025504°S 117.887825°E	Old Masonic Hall, Plantagenet Lodge No 1454	
Albany Forts	26	7	Forts Road	Mount Clarence	35.030722°S 117.91125°E	Nissen Hut, Princess Royal Battery/Barracks	
The Rocks	28	182-188	Grey Street	Albany	35.02414°S 117.87717°E	Government House, Government Cottage	
Melville House	29	5-9	Hotchin Avenue	Albany	35.023044°S 117.880676°E	J.F.T. Hassell's Home	
Old Albany Post Office	30	33	Stirling Terrace	Albany	35.0275°S 117.8871°E	Penny Post, Custom's House	
Matthew Cull's House	31	250	Middleton Road	Albany	35.016606°S 117.892167°E		
Strawberry Hill Farm & Gardens	32	168-170	Middleton Road	Albany	35.018194°S 117.900139°E	Old Farm, Strawberry Hill	
Desert Mounted Corps Memorial	34		Apex Driveive	Albany	35.025352°S 117.896037°E	Lone Pine Memorial	
Old Gaol, Albany	37	2-4	Parade Street	Albany	35.0283°S 117.8801°E		
Residency Museum	39		Residency Road	Albany	35.028642°S 117.880828°E		
Major Lockyer Memorial	40	2-4	Princess Royal Drive	Albany	35.029041°S 117.880851°E		
House, 25 Rowley Street	42	25	Rowley Street	Albany	35.023702°S 117.887764°E		
Albany Pilot Station (former)	43		Semaphore Point	Albany	35.036102°S 117.911203°E	Pilots' Houses	
Pyrmont	44	110	Serpentine Road	Mira Mar	35.021627°S 117.882009°E		
Hawthorndene	46	22-26	Seymour Street	Albany	35.017482°S 117.90327°E		
Sir Richard & Lady Spencer's Grave	48	39	Seymour Street	Albany	35.0158°S 117.902394°E		
Albany Court House Complex	51	184-190	Stirling Terrace	Albany	35.03°S 117.88°E	Police Station & Court House, Public Works, Albany Justice Complex	
Drew Robinson & Co (former)	52	82-84	Stirling Terrace	Albany	35.0268°S 117.8857°E	Albany Light Opera Company Building, Dylan's on the Tce, Adelaide Steamship Co Bld	
Rotunda	53		Stirling Terrace	Albany	35.0272°S 117.8853°E	Queen's Park Rotunda & Gardens, Jubilee Bandstand	
Albany House	58	119-125	York Street	Albany	35.03°S 117.88°E	Western QBE Insurance, Union Bank; ANZ Bank	
Argyle House	59	42-50	Stirling Terrace	Albany	35.02723°S 117.8868°E		
Western Australian Bank (former)	60	142-144	Stirling Terrace	Albany	35.026777°S 117.884294°E	Gt Southern Development Commission, Haynes Robinson, Bank of New South Wales- NSW	
Ballybane Tearooms (former)	61	168-180	Stirling Terrace	Albany	35.026798°S 117.882622°E	R Bell & Co Store, Backerei und Konditorei	
Glasgow House	62	56-58	Stirling Terrace	Albany	35.026943°S 117.886424°E		
Edinburgh House	63	52-54	Stirling Terrace	Albany	35.026959°S 117.886533°E		
National Bank (former)	64	86-94	Stirling Terrace	Albany	35.026724°S 117.88562°E	Vancouver Guest House & Cafe	
Royal George Hotel	65	60-70	Stirling Terrace	Albany	35.02705°S 117.8865°E		
Edward Barnett & Co Building (former)	66	96-102	Stirling Terrace	Albany	35.026524°S 117.885449°E	The Terrace Centre, Commercial Building	
White Star Hotel	67	72-80	Stirling Terrace	Albany	35.0268°S 117.8861°E	White Hart Hotel site	
Vancouver Arts Centre Group	69	77-87	Vancouver Street	Albany	35.026389°S 117.874722°E	Albany Cottage Hospital	
St John's Church	71		York Street	Albany	35.02325°S 117.883167°E	Church of St John the Evangelist	
St John's Rectory	73		York Street	Albany	35.025571°S 117.882676°E	Rectory of St. John's Anglican Church	
Albany Town Hall	74	217	York Street	Albany	35.023417°S 117.883167°E		
Law Offices (former), Albany	75	133-135	York Street	Albany	35.026405°S 117.883348°E	York House, Offices	
Empire Buildings	77	146-152	Stirling Terrace	Albany	35.02672°S 117.88394°E		
Scots Uniting Church	78	168-174	York Street	Albany	35.024873°S 117.884052°E	Scots Church, Presbyterian Church	
Taxi Rank & Women's Rest Room	79	826	Stirling Terrace	Albany	35.027188°S 117.883096°E	Cabmen's Shelter, Victoria Square	
Quaranup Complex	84		Quaranup Road, Geak Point, on the Vancouver Peninsula	Albany	35.052417°S 117.9135°E	Quarantine Station, Camp Quaranup	
Lower Kalgan River Bridge & Jetty Group	89		Albany-Nanarup Road	Kalgan	34.948525°S 117.97799°E	The Fruit Landing, Kalgan Bridge MRWA 4332	
Albany Fish Ponds	109		Festing Street	Mount Melville	35.025511°S 117.870018°E	Hares Folly, Maley's Stream	
Whaling Station (former), Cheyne Beach	1796		Hassell Beach	Albany	34.879647°S 118.408447°E		
Albany Snake Run Skateboard Park	1972	162	Hare Street	Mount Clarence	35.0195°S 117.897861°E	Snake Run Skate Park, Skateboard Track	
Whaling Cove (Ruins)	2994		Barker Bay, access by Quaranup Road	Albany	35.05669°S 117.926667°E	The Fisheries	
Point King Lighthouse Ruin	3212		Point King	Albany	35.035028°S 117.91825°E		
Albany Deepwater Jetty	3238		Princess Royal Harbour	Albany	35.031529°S 117.886246°E		
Albany Railway Station & Bond Store	3262	43-77	Proudlove Parade	Albany	35.027974°S 117.885978°E	Bonded Store, Luggage Room, Railway Institute, Tourist Bureau	
London Hotel	3339	160-162	Stirling Terrace	Albany	35.0268°S 117.8831°E		
Sealers' Oven	3343			Waychinicup National Park	34.894611°S 118.333972°E		
Breaksea Island and Lighthouse	3353		King George Sound	Albany	35.063292°S 118.05447°E		
1915 Block, Albany Primary School	3463	70-88	Albany Highway	Centennial Park	35.019294°S 117.881318°E	Albany Junior Primary School, Albany Infants' School	
St John's Church Group	3514	149-163	York Street	Albany	35.025686°S 117.882781°E	Church, Rectory & Peppermint Trees	
Albany Co-operative Society Building (former)	3555	46	Frederick Street	Albany	35.026027°S 117.887133°E	Albany Historical Society Headquarters, Former Albany Co-op, Alcona Guest House, P&O, Railway Barracks (former)	
Hillside	3572	6	Cliff Street	Albany	35.022399°S 117.878211°E	Hillside Lodge	
Albany Town Jetty	3607	Lot 580	Princess Royal Drive	Albany	35.031774°S 117.886416°E		
Cheynes Beach Whaling Station	3644		Frenchman Bay, King George Sound	Albany	35.094722°S 117.959722°E	Whaleworld, Albany Whaling Station	
Ballymena	3919		Willyung Road	King River	34.936809°S 117.898615°E	Ardens Gardens, Strathmore	
Albany Golf Course	4177	164	Golf Links Roads, Seppings & Collingwood Park	Albany	35.01272°S 117.918799°E	Albany Park, Albany Golf Links	
Albany Fire Station & Fire Officer's House	4276	71	Collie Street	Albany	35.024766°S 117.881632°E		
WA Christmas Tree	4344	Corner	Suffolk Street & Middleton Road	Albany	35.017396°S 117.889971°E	Nyutsia floribunda	
Stirling Terrace Precinct, Albany	14922		Stirling Terrace	Albany	35.027038°S 117.884873°E		
Lower Kalgan River Road Bridge	15422		Albany-Nanarup Road	Lower Kalgan	34.948615°S 117.978566°E	Old WAGR 4332	
St Joseph's Lodge (former)	15433	154-160	Aberdeen Street	Albany	35.020684°S 117.885365°E	New Camfield House, Former Clergy Housing	
Lockup & Residence	15451	35	Collie Street	Albany	35.026879°S 117.882185°E	Part of the Albany Court House Complex (51)	
House	15468	184-210	Stirling Terrace	Albany	35.026458°S 117.881920°E		
Residence, 206 Grey Street, Albany	15495	206	Grey Street	Albany	35.024996°S 117.875143°E		
Mouchemore's Cottage and Net Shed, Albany	15513	1	Parade Street	Albany	35.028856°S 117.8796°E		
Everett Buildings	15548	34-40	Stirling Terrace	Albany	35.02721°S 117.88697°E	Shops & Albany Backpackers, Tree of Life	
Commercial Building	15550	104-106	Stirling Terrace	Albany	35.026881°S 117.885202°E	Albany Curtain Centre	
Commercial Building	15551	108-110	Stirling Terrace	Albany	35.026497°S 117.885213°E	Paint & Protective Coating	
Drew Robinson & Co (former)	15552	130-140	Stirling Terrace	Albany	35.02642°S 117.884516°E	Harris Scarfe, Boans, Stirlings	
Commercial Building	15553	164-166	Stirling Terrace	Albany	35.026723°S 117.882941°E	Golf Shop, Liquor Store	
Kookas Restaurant Building	15554	204-208	Stirling Terrace	Albany	35.027222°S 117.881518°E	Resident's House and Commissariat Office	
Garryowen	15562	42	Vancouver Street	Albany	35.025333°S 117.878655°E		
King River Hall	15588		Millbrook Road	King River	34.934401°S 117.895924°E		
US Navy Submariners' Memorial, World War II	15618		Princess Royal Fortress	Albany	35.031501°S 117.913338°E	Part of Albany Forts Precinct (26)	
Kalgan River Jetty	15636		south of the Lower Kalgan River Bridge	Lower Kalgan	34.9488°S 117.9772°E	The Fruit Landing, Lower Kalgan Ferry	
Eclipse Island & Lighthouse	15740		Eclipse Island	Albany	35.182778°S 117.886667°E		
Albany Memorial Park Cemetery	15756	263-275	Middleton Road	Albany	35.0178°S 117.8894°E	Old Albany Cemetery, Middleton Road Cemetery,, Pioneer Cemetery, Memorial Park Cemetery	
St Joseph's Catholic Church Group	16297	120-160	Aberdeen Street	Albany	35.02166°S 117.885417°E	St Joseph's School for Young Ladies, St Joseph's Presbytery	
Frenchman Bay Whaling Station (former)	16612		Whalers Beach, Frenchman Bay	Albany	35.092619°S 117.948156°E	Norwegian Whaling Station, Whaler's Beach	
Albany Railway Station/Tourist Bureau	24543	45-55	Proudlove Parade	Albany	35.027974°S 117.885978°E		
Former Headmaster's House	24544	117-121	Serpentine Road	Albany	35.022881°S 117.882244°E	Governor's Residence	
Customs Bonded Warehouse	24545	57-77	Proudlove Parade	Albany	35.028078°S 117.886505°E		
Educational Resources Centre	24547	117-121	Serpentine Road	Albany	35.022441°S 117.882158°E	Albany Primary School	
Lower Kalgan Bridge Trusses	24562		Nanarup Road	Lower Kalgan	34.948408°S 117.976730°E		
Albany Seaboard Bulk Fuel Oil Depot	26441		Princess Royal Drive	Albany	35.0218962°S 117.861798°E		

== Former places ==
The following place has been removed from the State Register of Heritage Places within the City of Albany:

Place name	Place #	Street number	Street name	Suburb or town	Co-ordinates	Notes & former names	Photo
Buildings	68	Corner	Stirling Terrace & Spencer Street	Albany	^{[?]}		

=== Notes ===
- ^[?]No coordinates specified by Inherit database
