= Residency Point, Albany =

Location in Albany, Western Australia

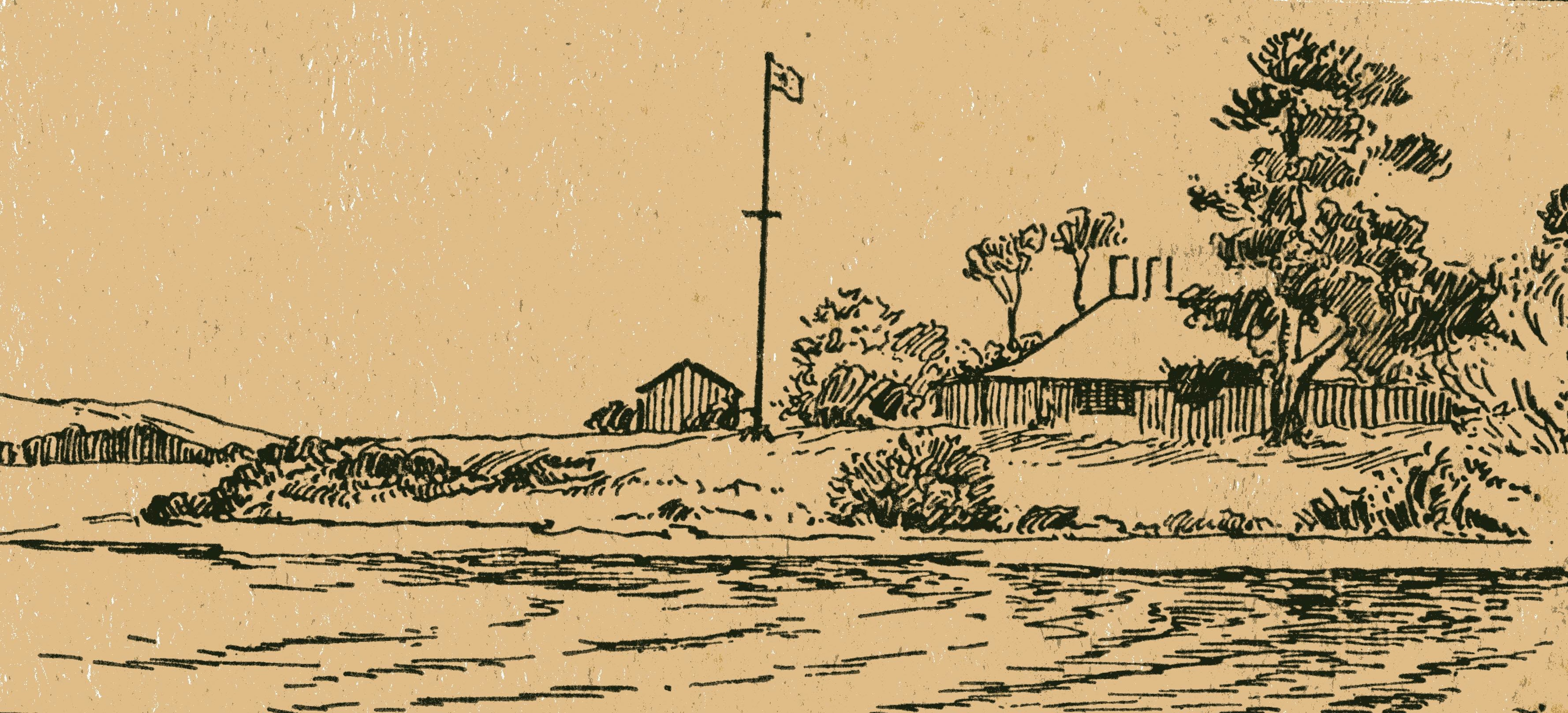
Illustration on the cover of 1927 Centenary book

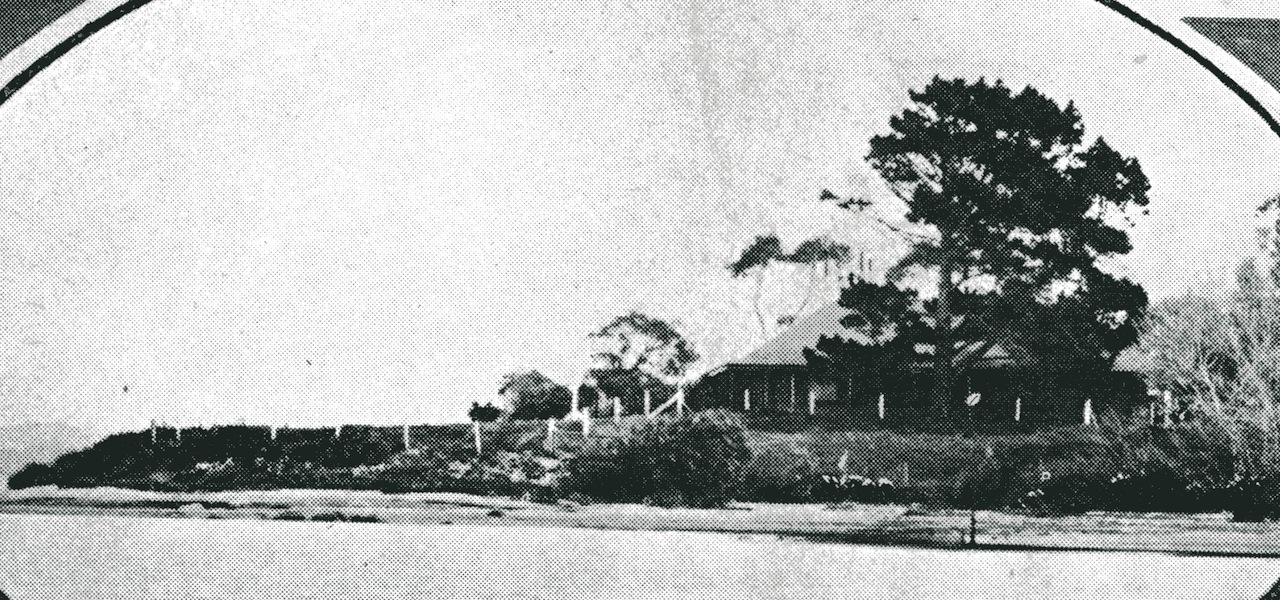
Photograph of Residency Point circa 1927

Residency Point was a location on the northern shore of Princess Royal Harbour, in Albany, Western Australia where Edmund Lockyer raised the British flag in 1827.

In 1927 during the Centenary of Albany the location was used to celebrate the event.

The Residency Museum, which is housed in the building seen in early drawings and photographs, is located close to the point. The Great Southern Railway runs behind the Residency Museum building, while the more recent constructed Princess Royal Drive has changed the shoreline of the harbour and the surrounds of the historical location on the point.

The coal hulk Sarah Burnyeat caught fire whilst coaling another ship and was abandoned at its present position off Residency Point.
