= Residency Museum =

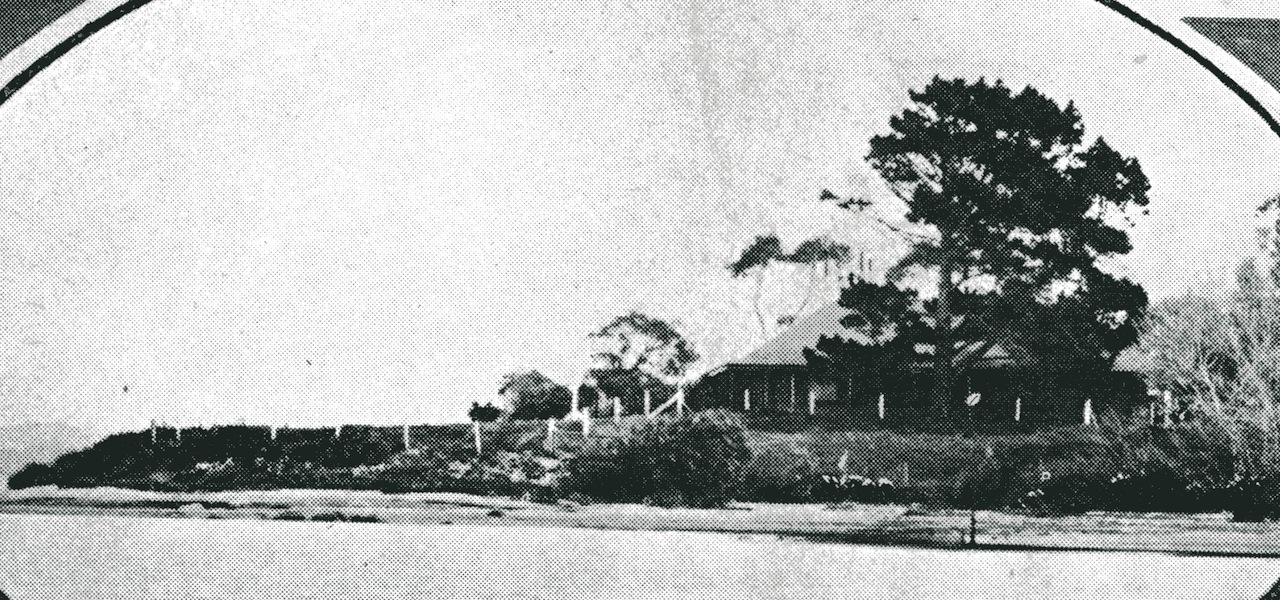
- Residency Point (and building behind tree) in 1927
- Interactive map of the Residency Museum area

General information
- Type: Museum
- Location: Albany, Western Australia
- Coordinates: 35.0287°S 117.8808°E

Western Australia Heritage Register
- Type: State Registered Place
- Designated: 29 November 1996
- Reference no.: 39

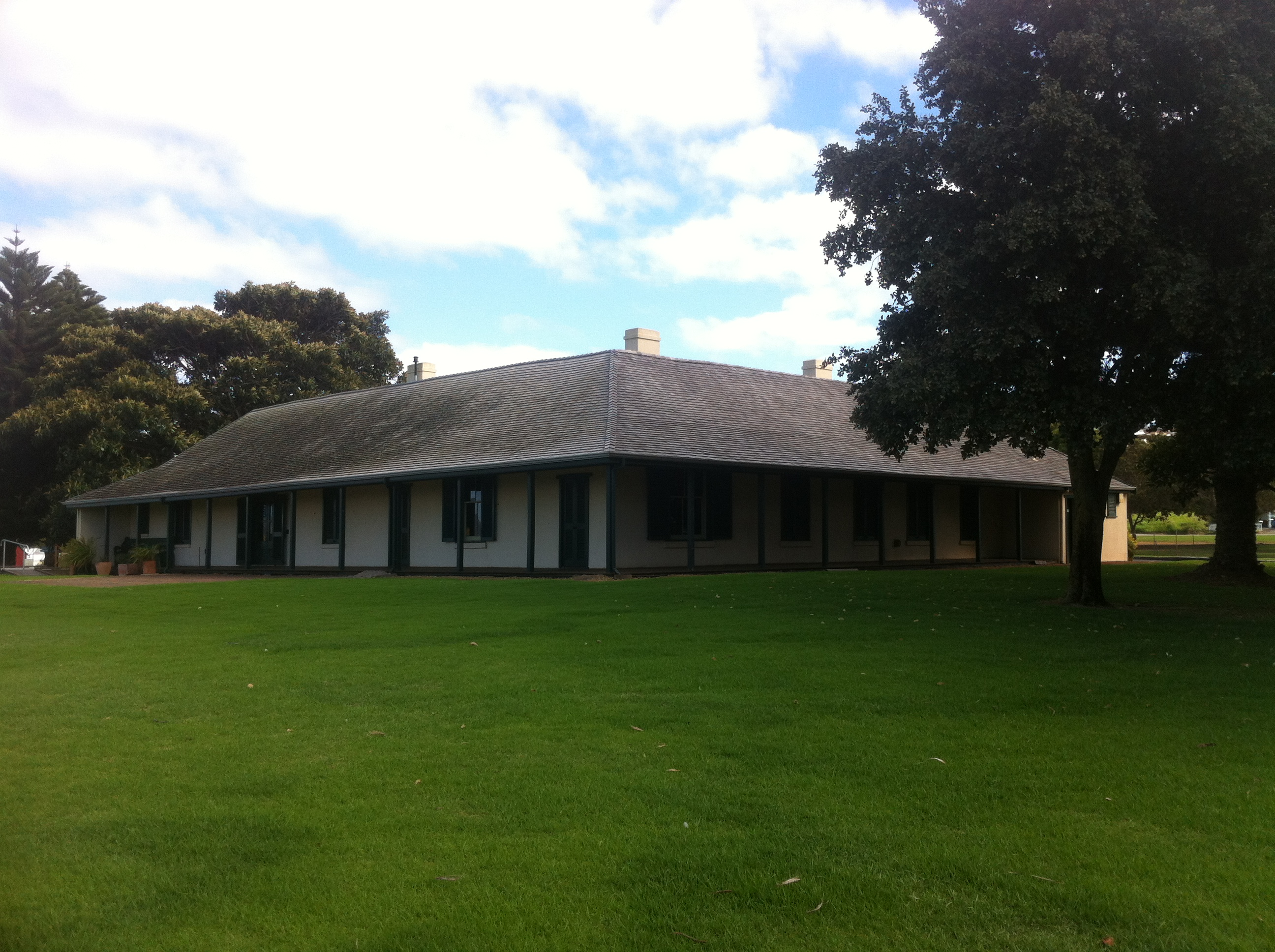
Residency Museum from grounds on southern side

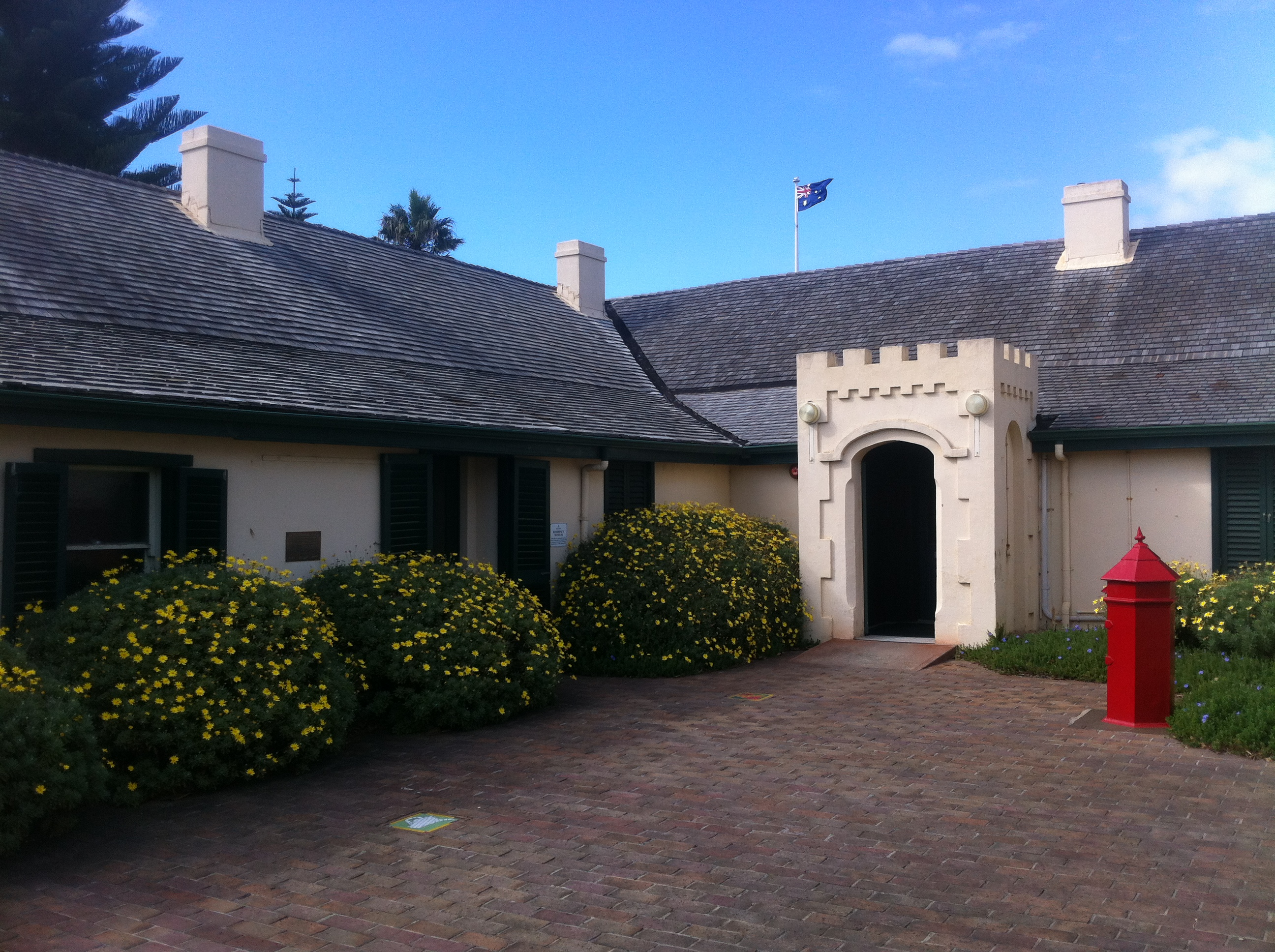
Entry vestibule

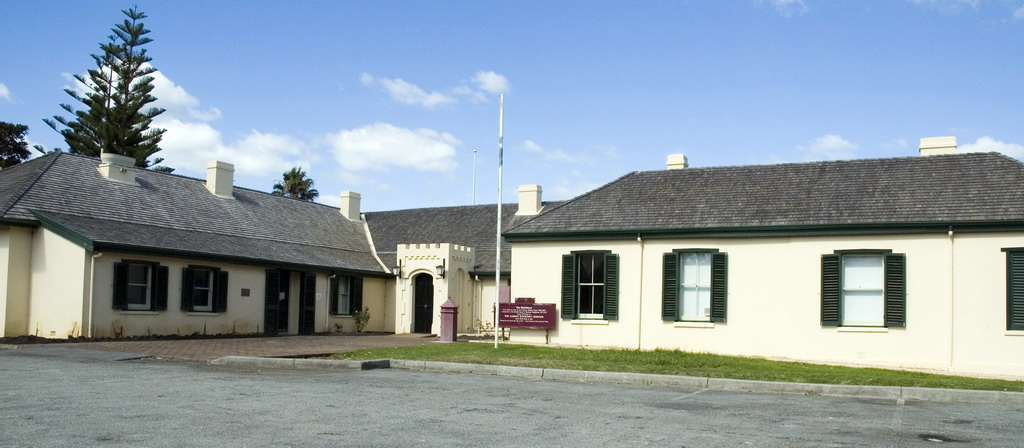
Albany Residency Museum, northern entrance

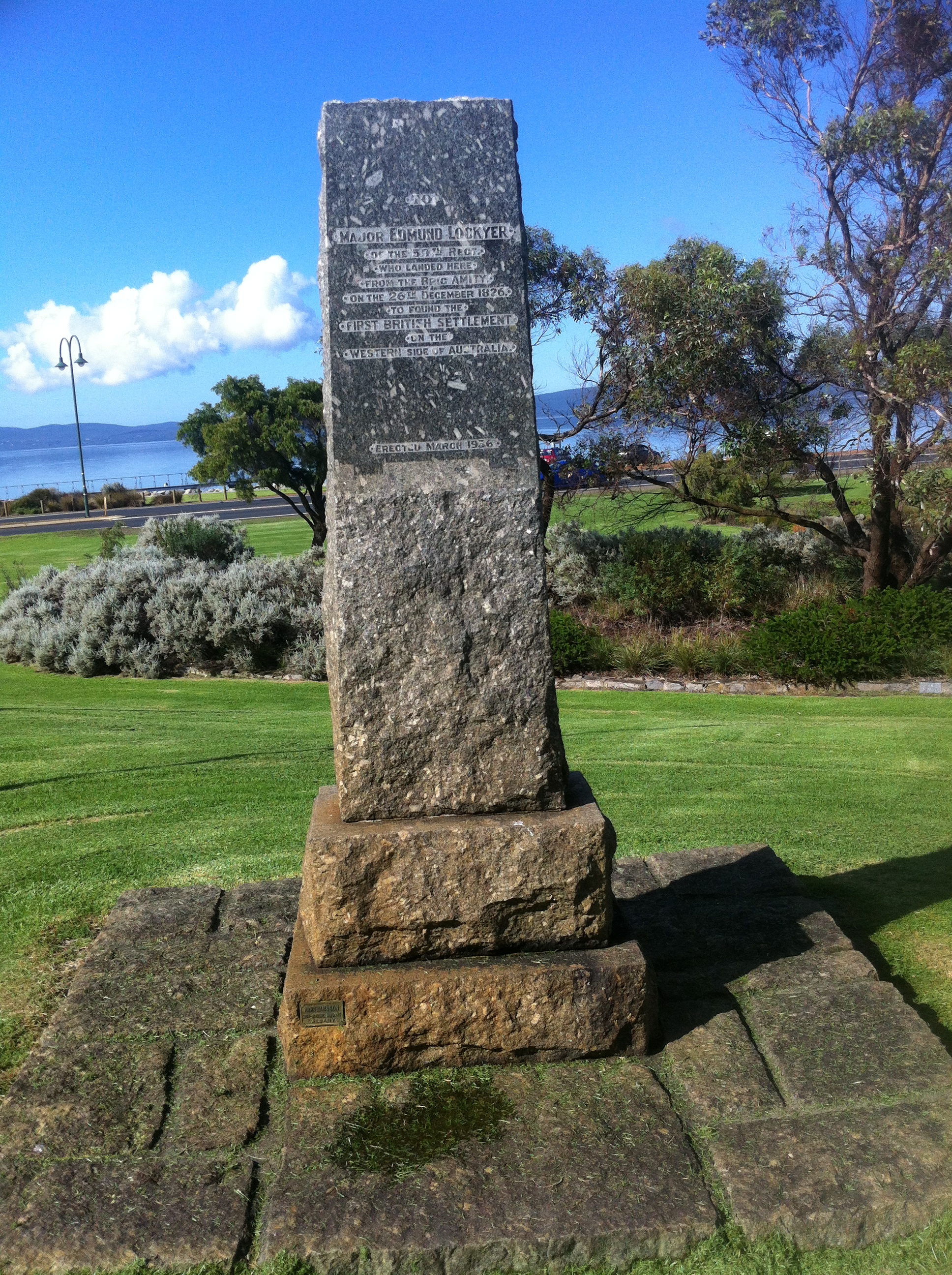
Lockyer memorial near the residency

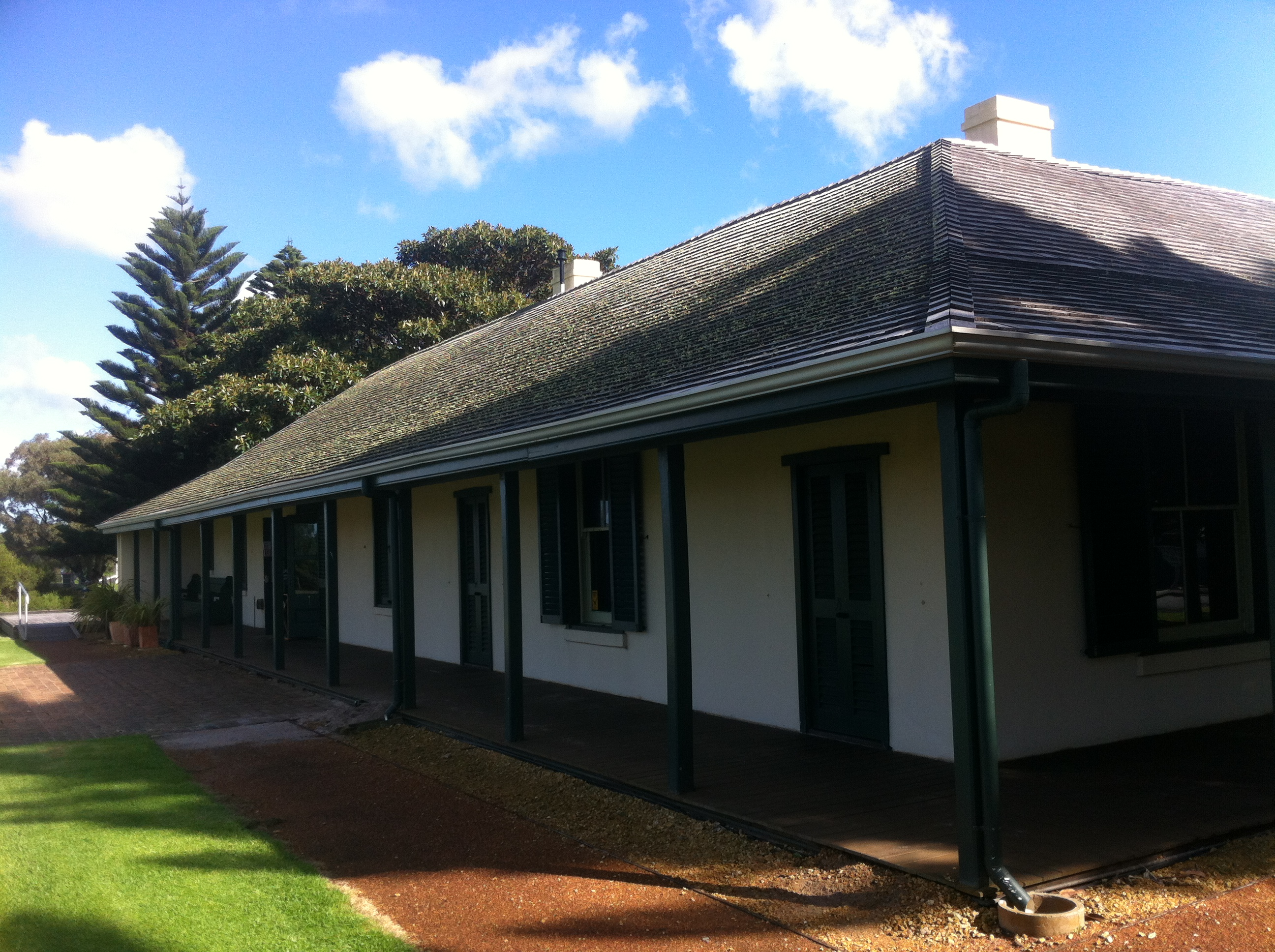
Residency, SE corner

The Residency Museum, also referred to as the Residency Building, is an exhibition space at the Museum of the Great Southern in Albany in the Great Southern region of Western Australia.

== Description ==
The site overlooks Princess Royal Harbour and is where Major Edmund Lockyer hoisted the British flag in 1827.

The museum is a single storey building with a timber shingled roof. The building has an L shape, with the entrance on the northern side. The walls are of brick construction rendered externally and plastered internally. The roof is timber framed and the building is enclosed with a verandah. An entry vestibule is on the inside of the L shape, with brick paving and a parking area.

Initially the building was a single room, used as a store. Over the next few years another three rooms were added, with all four rooms having a common hipped roof. Further extensions and renovations occurred when it became the governor's residence in 1873, with an additional seven rooms being added creating the L-shaped building.

== History ==
The building was originally completed in 1854 and served as a store and an office for the nearby convict hiring depot at the Albany Convict Gaol. Following the closure of the depot in 1872 seven more rooms with an exterior verandah were added to the building for renovations to convert it to the Governor's Residency. From 1873 to 1953 the building housed the local government administrator, known as the Government Resident until 1901 and later as the Resident Magistrate. Both positions has social status and the building hosted tea parties, balls, weddings and other social events.

King George V spent his 16th birthday in the Residency with his brother Prince Albert Victor in 1881. The two were on a naval tour when their ship, HMS Bacchante, broke its rudder during a storm.

The Major Lockyer Memorial was erected in 1936 between the Residency and the harbour.

From 1953 to 1970 the building had various other uses including a school hostel, a sea scout headquarters, naval depot and training facility. By 1975 renovations were completed and it reopened as the Residency Museum, the first branch of the Western Australian Museum to open outside of the Perth metropolitan area.

Elizabeth II visited the site in 1977 to officially open the Lockyer Memorial as part of the 150th anniversary of first British settlement in Western Australia celebrations.

In 1985 the site was renamed as the Western Australian Museum - Albany. The site received temporary heritage listing in 1996, and in 2010 further renovations were completed creating several new galleries used to display Mineng and settlers' stories.

By 1996 the building was cracking badly with rising damp and several leaks.

The building was extensively refurbished in 2010.

The building is now part of the Museum of the Great Southern.

== See also ==
- List of places on the State Register of Heritage Places in the City of Albany
