= Wesley Church, Albany =

Church in Albany, Western Australia

Wesley Church
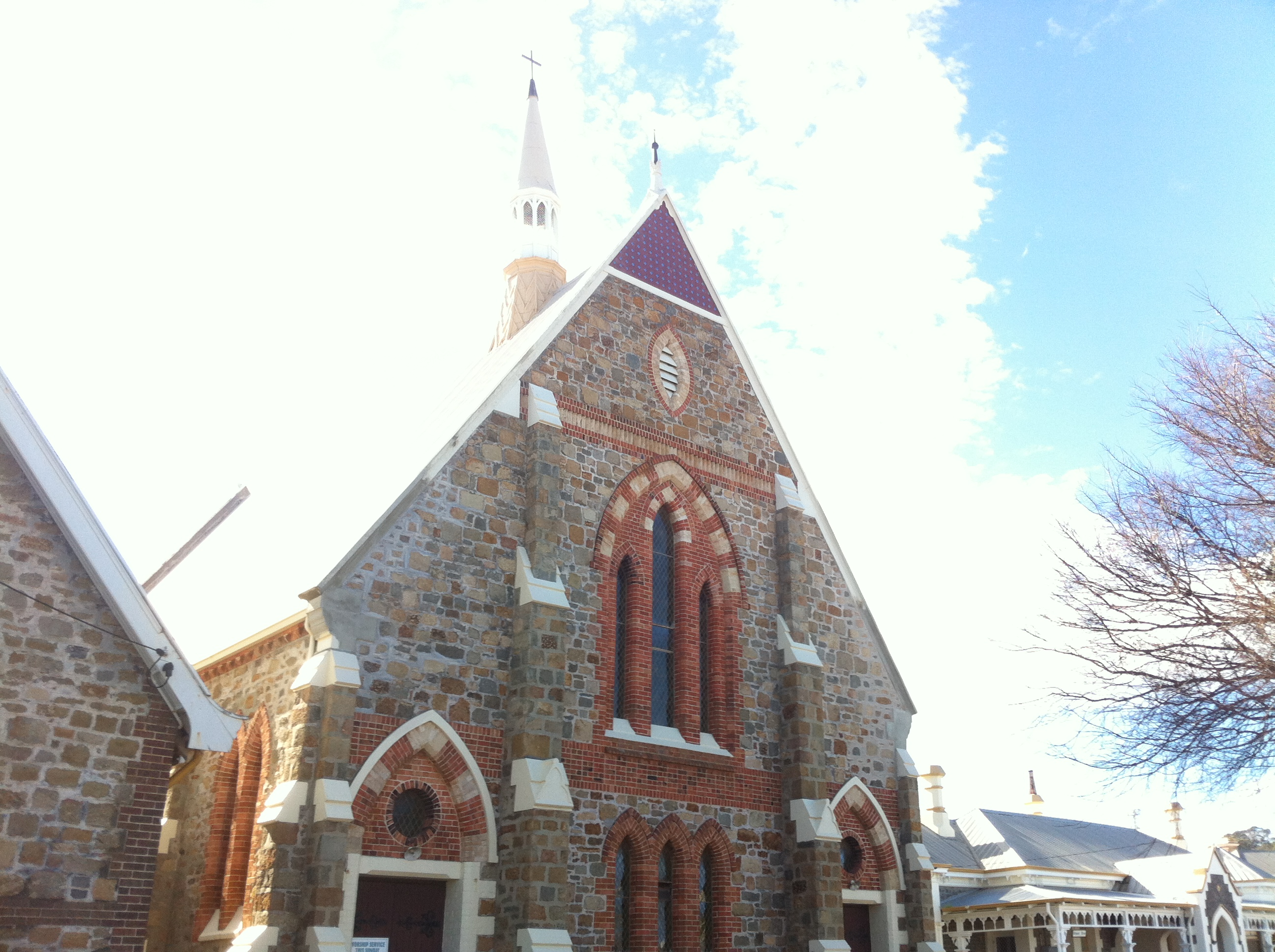
- Wesley Church, Albany
- Wesley Church
- 35°01′34″S 117°52′51″E
- Address: Duke Street, Albany, Great Southern region of Western Australia
- Country: Australia
- Denomination: Uniting (since 1977)
- Previous denomination: Methodist (1890 – 1977)
- Website: arc.ucwa.au

History
- Former name: Wesley Methodist Church
- Status: Church

Architecture
- Functional status: Active
- Architectural type: Church
- Style: Victorian
- Completed: 1890
- Construction cost: A£2,695

Specifications
- Materials: Brick; granite

Administration
- Parish: Albany Region Congregations

Western Australia Heritage Register
- Type: State Registered Place
- Designated: 11 December 2018
- Reference no.: 21

Wesley Church is a Uniting church located on Duke Street, overlooking Princess Royal Harbour, in Albany in the Great Southern region of Western Australia.

== History ==
Founded by the Methodist Church as the Wesley Methodist Church, it was built in a late Victorian style in 1890 at a cost of A£2,695. The church has walls of brick and local granite with elaborate brick window surrounds. It also features gothic elements such as pointed arched entrances, a tall spire and pointed arched windows. The manse was built on the eastern side of the church in 1903 at a cost of £1,250 in a matching architectural style. Both buildings were funded by the Robinson family who held large commercial, land and legal interests in both Albany and Perth.

The complex, consisting of the church, hall and manse are heritage listed. The hall was built first in 1863 and then replaced in 1891, now known as Albert Hall. The church was opened the same year after replacing an earlier building, parts of which were incorporated into the hall.

The church is set close to the road with a symmetrical façade, a tower and spire. It has a steeply pitched roof, parapeted gable and wall buttresses. The stone masonry is finished with brick trim. The hall sits next to the church also has a symmetrical facade and a steeply pitched roof that includes a row of vents. It has a central arched doorway and five centred flat-topped windows above the door. The manse has a symmetrical façade, stone construction with painted brick quoining around windows and doors. There is a central portico with arched entrance, a verandah with decorative timber posts and frieze. The main roof is hipped and topped with four distinctive chimneys.

In 1977 the Methodist Church, the Presbyterian Church of Australia, and the Congregational Union of Australia merged to form the Uniting Church.

== See also ==
- List of places on the State Register of Heritage Places in the City of Albany
