= Princess Royal Fortress =

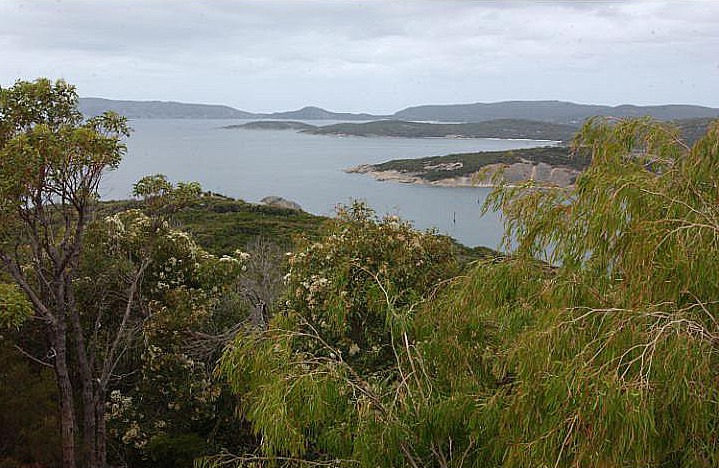
- View from fortress to King George Sound and Atatürk entrance
- Interactive map of the Princess Royal Fortress area

General information
- Type: Heritage listed fortress
- Location: Albany, Western Australia
- Coordinates: 35°01′50.6″S 117°54′40.5″E

Western Australia Heritage Register
- Type: State Registered Place
- Designated: 29 November 1996
- Reference no.: 26

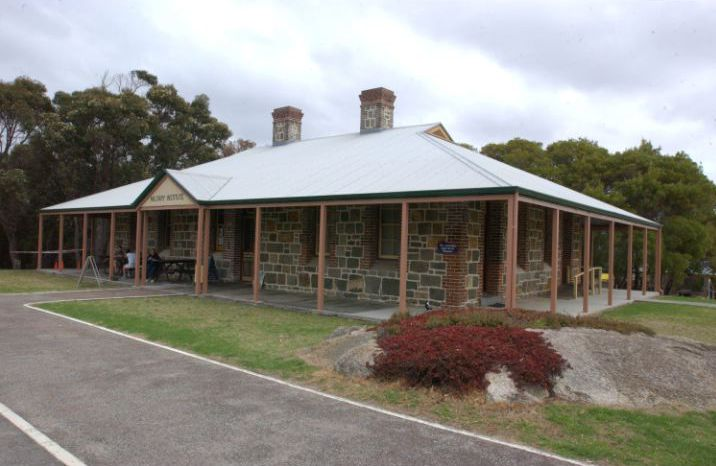
Light Horse memorial building

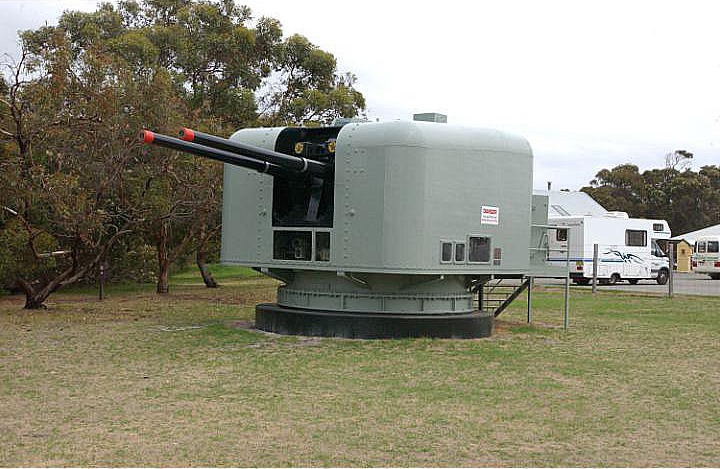
Naval gun on display at the fortress

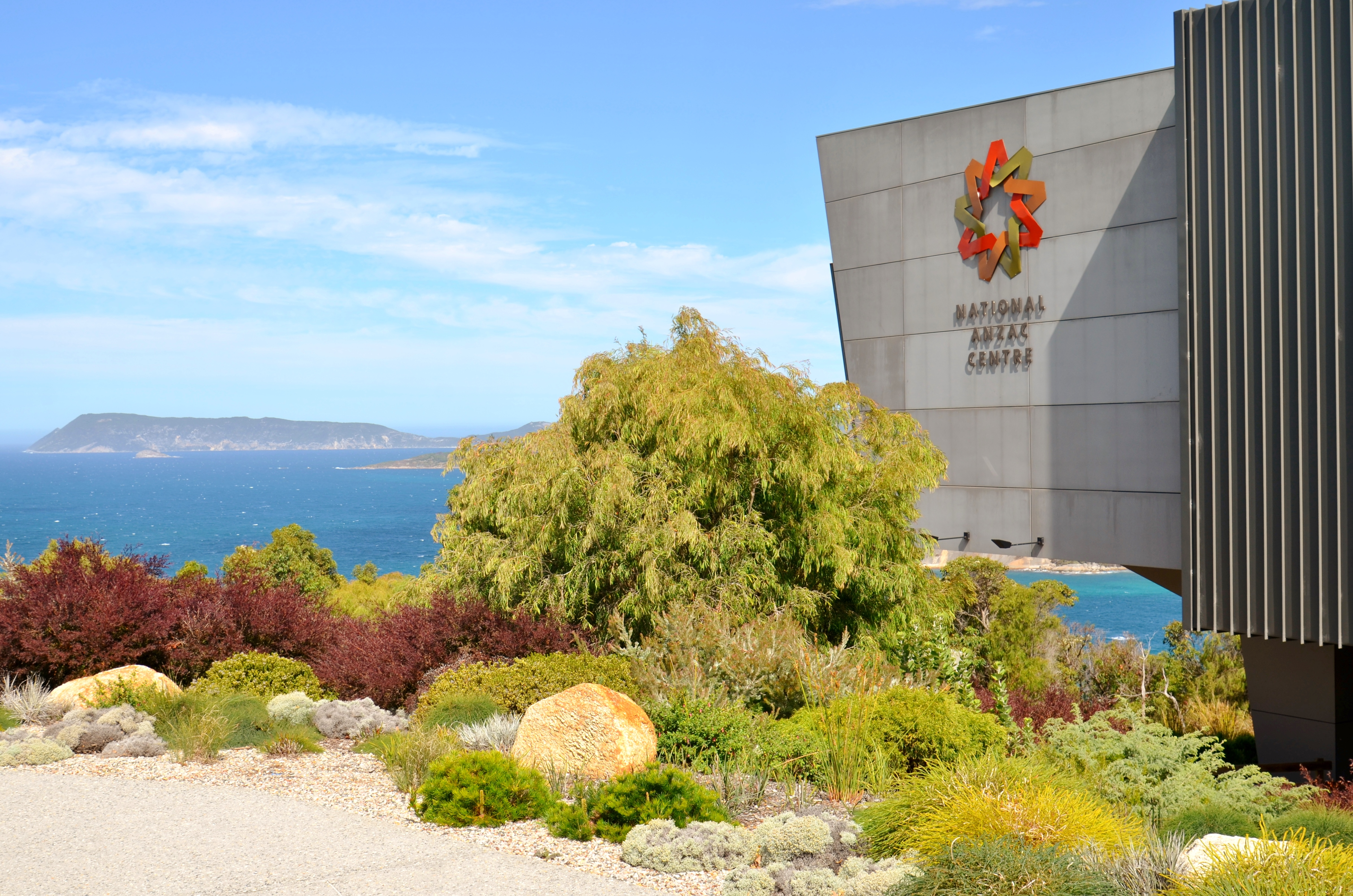
National Anzac Centre 2018

Princess Royal Fortress, also known as Albany Forts, was a fortress on the northern shore of Atatürk entrance on Princess Royal Harbour on Mount Adelaide overlooking King George Sound in Albany, Western Australia. It now operates as a museum.

== Name ==
The fortress is named after Princess Royal Harbour, which George Vancouver had named in 1791 after Princess Charlotte Augusta Matilda. The site occupies an area of approximately 11 acres (4 ha).

== Establishment ==
During the 19th century, the loss of the port was deemed a potential threat to the state and the nation. All the Australian states contributed the funds to build the fortress, and the British Government provided the guns. The fortress was the first federal defense project in Australia, without the country yet having a federal government, and opened in 1893. Two gun batteries were dug into the hillside of Mount Adelaide: Fort Princess Royal with two Mark IV 6-inch BL guns, and Fort Plantagenet with one six inch gun.

== Fires and changes ==
In 1897, a fire, caused by an incendiary, destroyed the canteen, mess-room and library. The buildings were all weatherboard, with matchwood lining and galvanized metal roofs.

The fortress was staffed by eight officers and five men of the South Australian Permanent Artillery in 1902.

A fire broke out in buildings at the western end of the forts in 1907. The quartermaster sergeant's office, the armament room and the stationery locker were burned to the ground.

In 1909, the Mk VI gun at the Plantagenet battery developed a fault in the barrel, the gun was scrapped and Fort Plantagenet was abandoned. The remaining guns were replaced with emplaced Mk VII guns in 1945, and the old guns were scrapped. From 1893 to 1956 the guns never fired a shot in anger. In 1956, with the advent of the missile era, all coastal defenses were made redundant and closed, including Princess Royal. Many of the military installations were demolished or dismantled. The buildings were alternatively used as school rooms, migrant hostels and then holiday camps, by the 1970s the site was abandoned and succumbed to vandalism.

== Restoration ==
The fortress was extensively restored commencing in 1987 and continued throughout the rest of the 1980s.

Eventually the site became a museum; within the fortress grounds are restored military equipment including shore batteries, armories, barracks, the 10th Light Horse display, trails and a collection of naval guns and torpedoes. The site is also home to the South East Asia Memorial, United States Submariners Memorial, and Merchant Navy Memorial. Over 25,000 tourists visit the fortress annually. Two guns remain in their original positions along with an underground magazine, ruins, several transported buildings, some substantially reconstructed buildings, and a parade ground. The Military Institute, Guard House, Barracks and Repository Store are situated around the parade ground, whereas the location of the other buildings depends more on the site topography.

== National Anzac Centre ==
The entire site underwent a major upgrade in preparation for the Anzac centenary commemorations in 2015. The National Anzac Centre was constructed at a cost of A$10.65 million and was opened at the site on 1 November 2014 by the Prime Minister of Australia, Tony Abbott and the Prime Minister of New Zealand, John Key. The date marked the centenary of the first Australian and New Zealand convoy's departure for war from Albany.

The National Anzac Centre was named the state's best Heritage Tourism Project at the Western Australian Heritage Awards in 2015. The centre received approximately 25,000 visitors in the first three months and over 45,000 during its first six months of operation.

By September 2016, the centre was ranked as Australia's number one museum by TripAdvisor users and had attracted 136,000 visitors since opening.

== Engineering heritage award ==
The battery and magazine received a Historic Engineering Marker from Engineers Australia as part of its Engineering Heritage Recognition Program.

== See also ==
- List of places on the State Register of Heritage Places in the City of Albany
