= Snake Run =

Oldest Skatepark in Albany, Western Australia

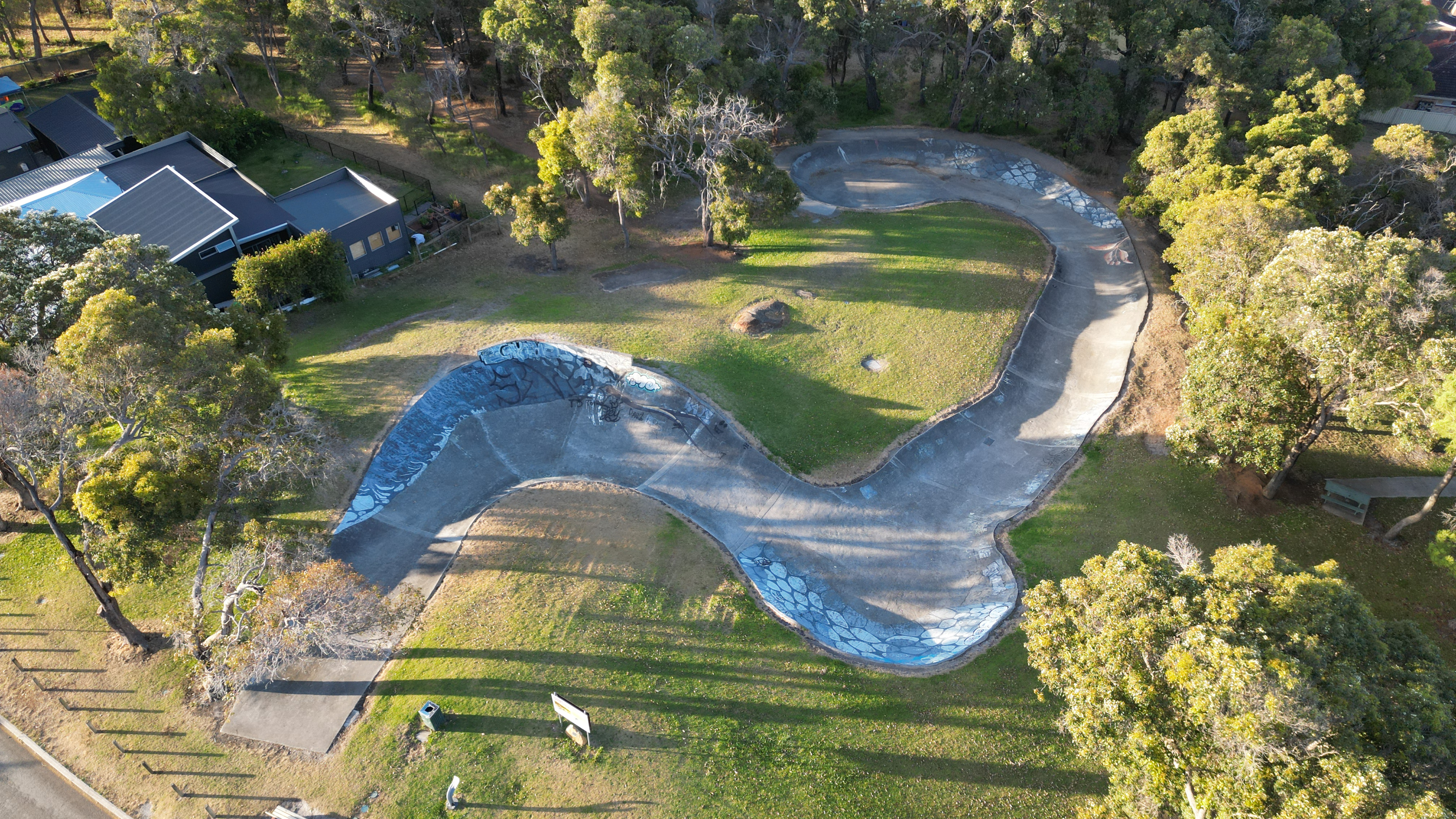
- A drone shot taken in 2023 with the start of the Snake Run in the bottom left
- Interactive map of the Snake Run area

General information
- Type: Skatepark
- Location: Albany, Western Australia
- Coordinates: 35°01′10.2″S 117°53′52.3″E

Western Australia Heritage Register
- Type: State Registered Place
- Designated: 17 May 2016
- Reference no.: 1972

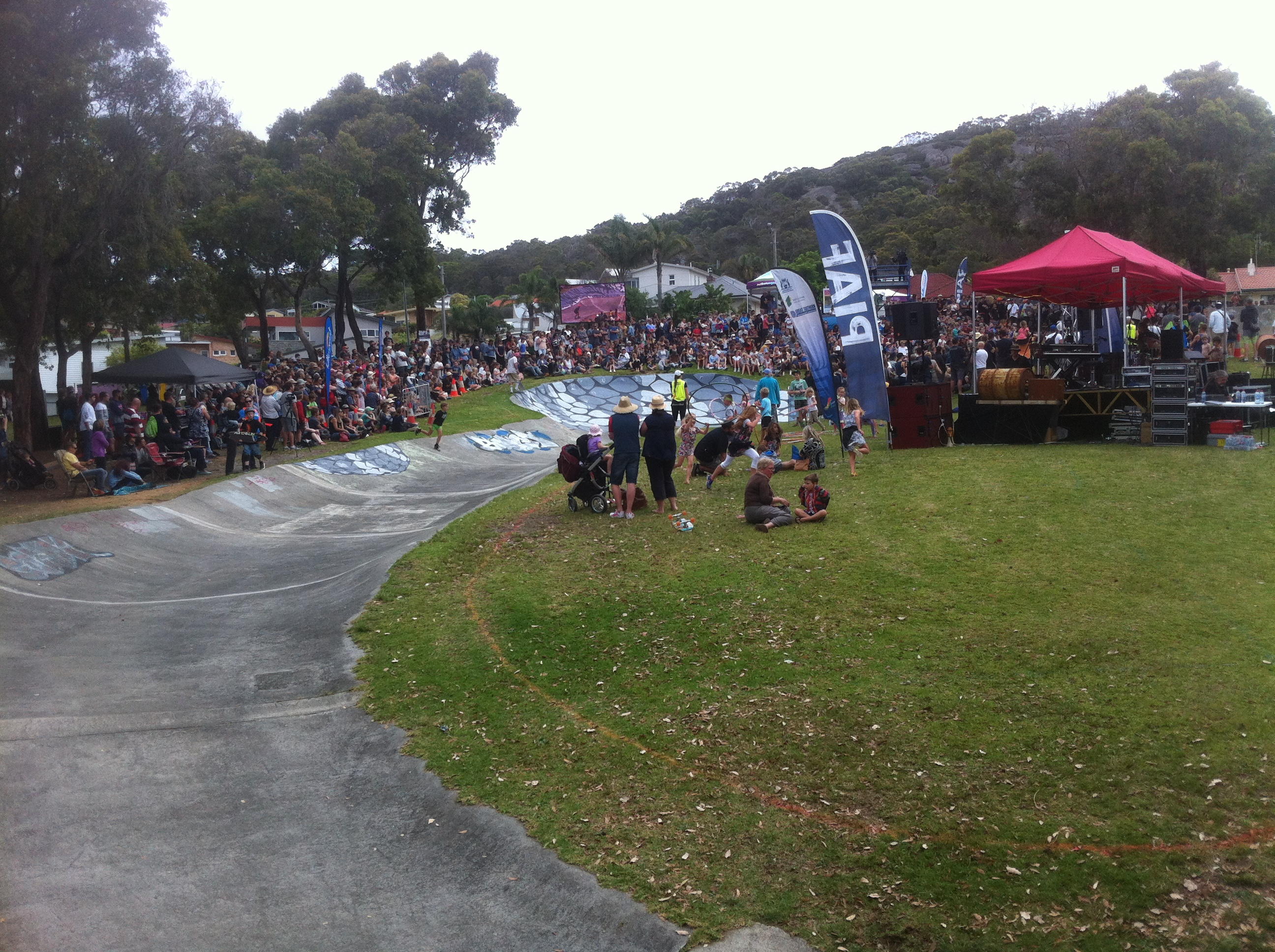
Near the bottom of the Snake Run, 2016

The Snake Run, also known as the Albany Snake Run, Albany Skate Track and Hare Street Skate Park, is a skatepark in Albany, Western Australia. The park is the oldest community funded skatepark in Australia and the second oldest in the world.

The impetus for a dedicated skatepark came following the death of a skateboarder in Albany's main street in the mid-1970s. In 1975 a group of students from Albany Senior High School formed a committee with the idea of building a skatepark. The group started fundraising and soon accumulated A$3,000. The Albany Town Council donated 3 acres (1 ha) of land that was once a gravel quarry and donated A$10,000 to the project.

The track was opened in February 1976 by the American skateboarder Russ Howell.

The run is made from concrete and is 140 metres (459 ft) in length running downhill. The track is curved downward and lipped with a wall on first turn with lower rises on the next two turns and finishing with a drained bowl at the end.

The park was heritage listed in 2016, making it one of the only three skateparks in the world that have heritage status.

== See also ==
- List of places on the State Register of Heritage Places in the City of Albany – List of heritage places in Western Australia
