= Everett Buildings =

Heritage listed buildings in Albany, Western Australia

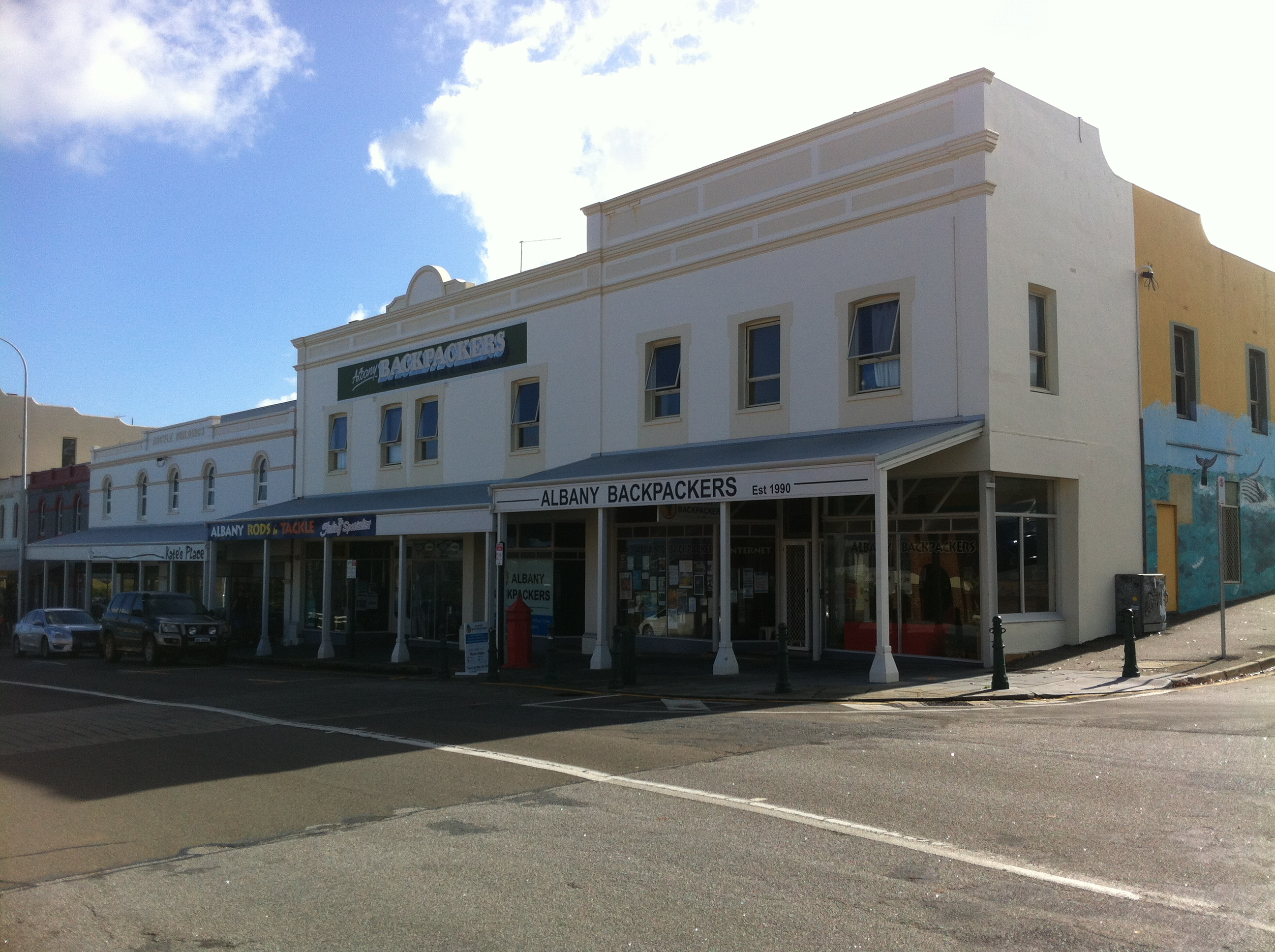
- Everett Buildings 2016
- Interactive map of the Everett Buildings area

General information
- Type: Heritage listed building
- Location: Albany, Western Australia
- Coordinates: 35.02721°S 117.88697°E

Western Australia Heritage Register
- Type: State Registered Place
- Designated: 7 December 2007
- Part of: Stirling Terrace Precinct, Albany (14922)
- Reference no.: 15548

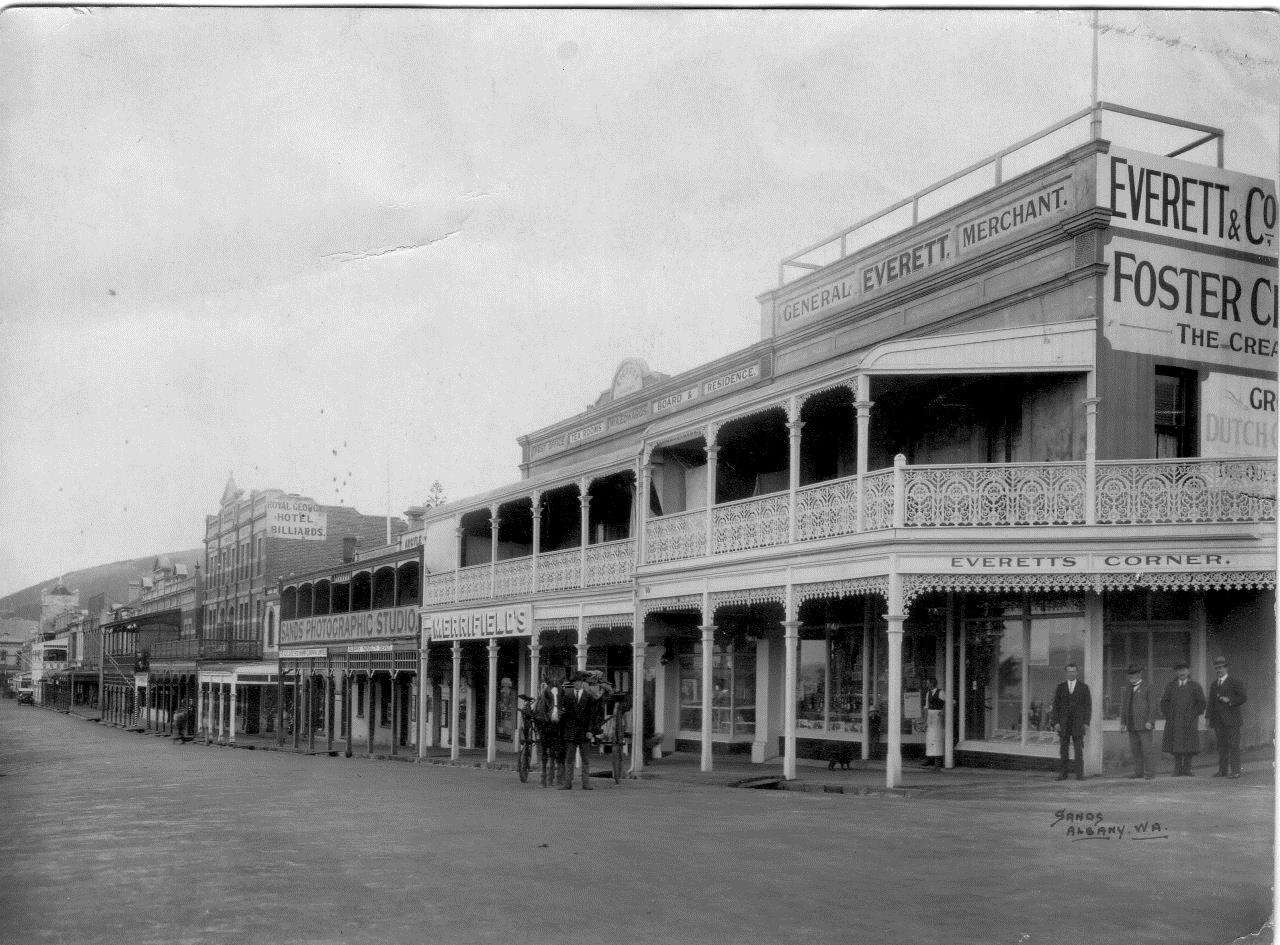
Everetts Corner 1918

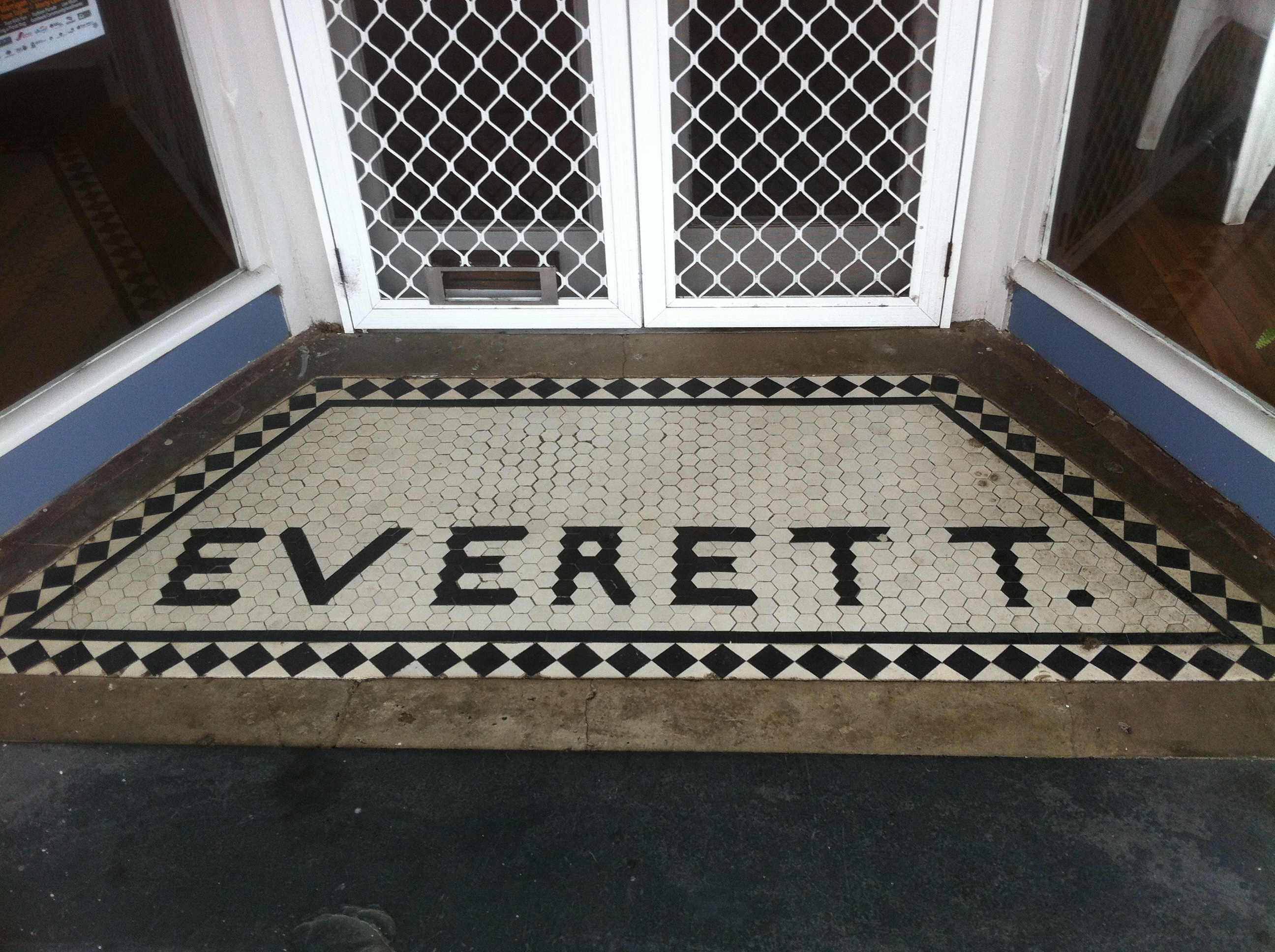
Mosaic at entry of Everett building

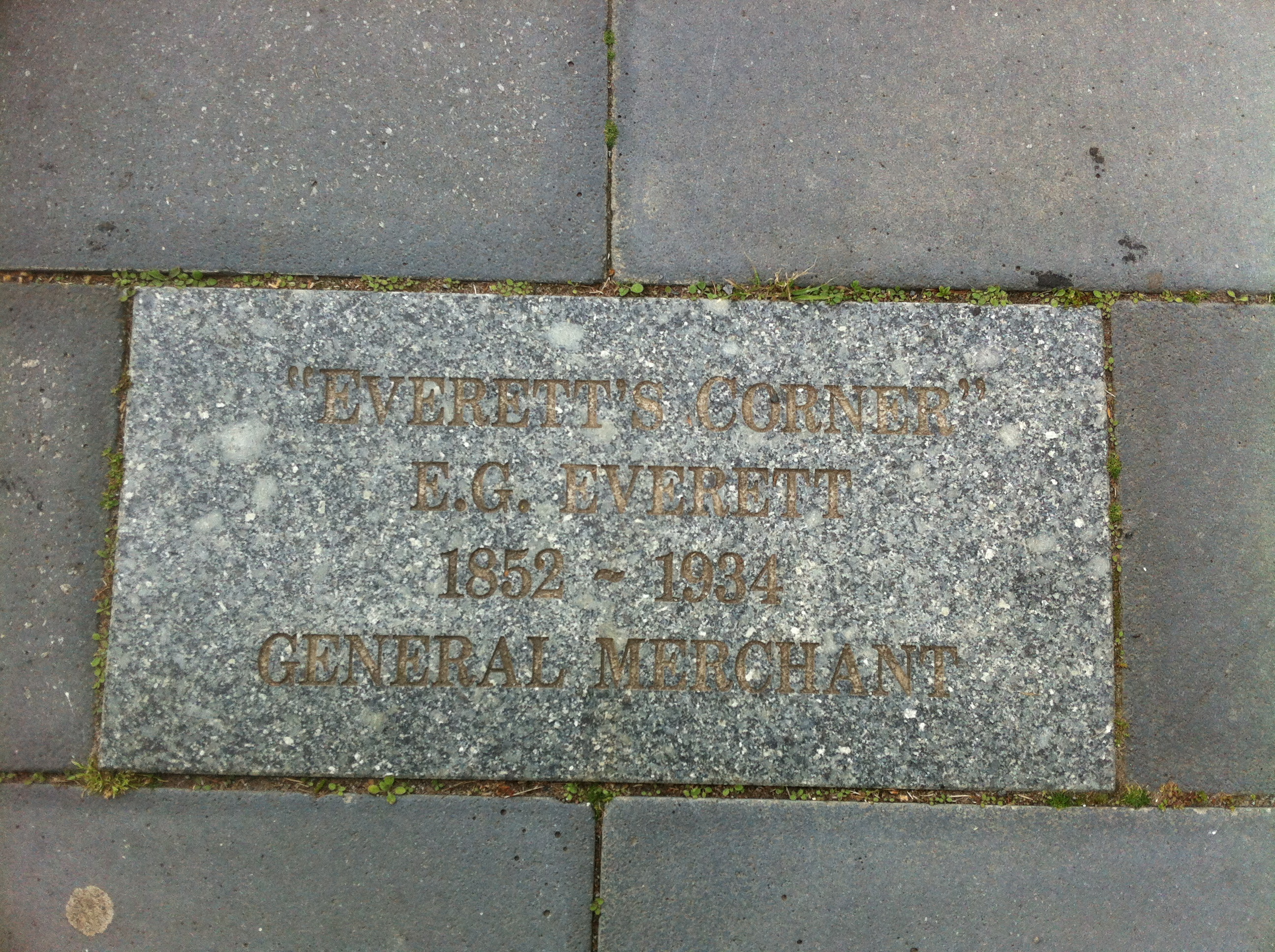
Plaque at Everett corner outside Everett building

The Everett Buildings are a group of heritage listed buildings in Albany in the Great Southern region of Western Australia.

They are located on the corner of Stirling Terrace and Spencer Street almost directly opposite the Old Post Office building. The Everett Buildings are part of a group of similar scale two storey buildings that have an asymmetrical facade. The buildings have rendered brick walls and parapet walls above the roof line.

The building was originally a single storey with a second storey added on much later. The buildings also have massed informal windows, recessed doors, rendered chimneys with moulded caps and a cantilevered box veranda.

In 1936 the buildings were auctioned. They were a grocery, hardware store, drapery, tea-rooms, confectioners and a four bedroom private residence.

A drapery in the building that had existed since 1911 nearly burned down in 1938 when a fire started in the building. Volunteers extinguished the fire after establishing a bucket chain. The building was owned by Percy McCarthy at the time.

In 2014 a heritage grant was awarded to the Everett Building and other heritage buildings for work such as painting and repairs to facades, brickwork and windows as part of Anzac Centenary commemorations.

Albany Backpackers now takes up part of the buildings which was originally Everett's store.

== See also ==
- List of places on the State Register of Heritage Places in the City of Albany
