= Glasgow House =

Heritage building in Albany, Western Australia

Coordinates: 35.0273°S 117.8863°E

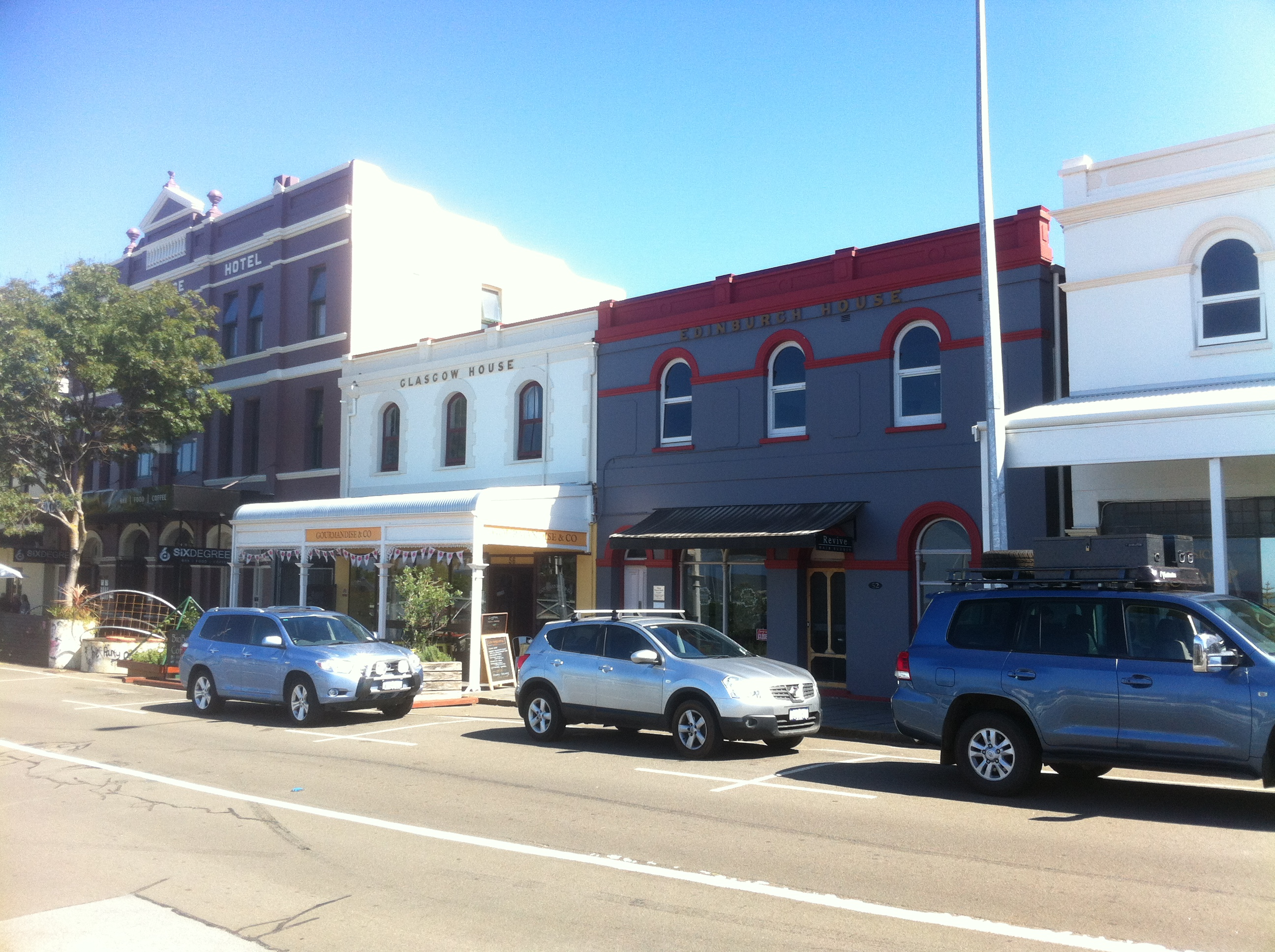
- Glasgow House is the second building from the left.
- Interactive map of the Glasgow House area

General information
- Location: 56-58, Stirling Terrace, Albany, Western Australia
- Completed: 1882

Western Australia Heritage Register
- Type: State Registered Place
- Designated: 7 December 2007
- Part of: Stirling Terrace Precinct, Albany (14922)
- Reference no.: 62

Glasgow House is a heritage listed building on Stirling Terrace overlooking Princess Royal Harbour in Albany in the Great Southern region of Western Australia.

Glasgow House is situated between the Royal George Hotel and Edinburgh House. It was built for Alexander Moir, along with Edinburgh House, in 1882. Before these buildings were constructed a row of single storey cottages had occupied the site. The cottages housed a bootmaker, baker and tailor as well as other tradespeople. Alexander Moir's son, John Moir, took over the family business and after his father died in 1893 Glasgow house became the headquarters of the Moir merchant business.

Neighbouring Edinburgh House and Glasgow House both housed shipping agents for a time while Stirling Terrace was the main street in Albany.

The two storey building is of a classical regency design and set amongst a group of similar scale buildings. It has a parapet concealing the roof, the building frontage has decorative motifs and smooth textured walling. There is projected quoin moulding around arched windows set in straight lines with other quoins on both sides of the upper facade and a cantilevered box verandah.

In 2014 a heritage grant of A$26,418 was awarded to the Glasgow House and other heritage buildings for work such as painting and new verandahs and windows as part of Anzac Centenary commemorations.

== See also ==
- List of places on the State Register of Heritage Places in the City of Albany
