= Albany Convict Gaol =

Place on the Western Australia Heritage Register

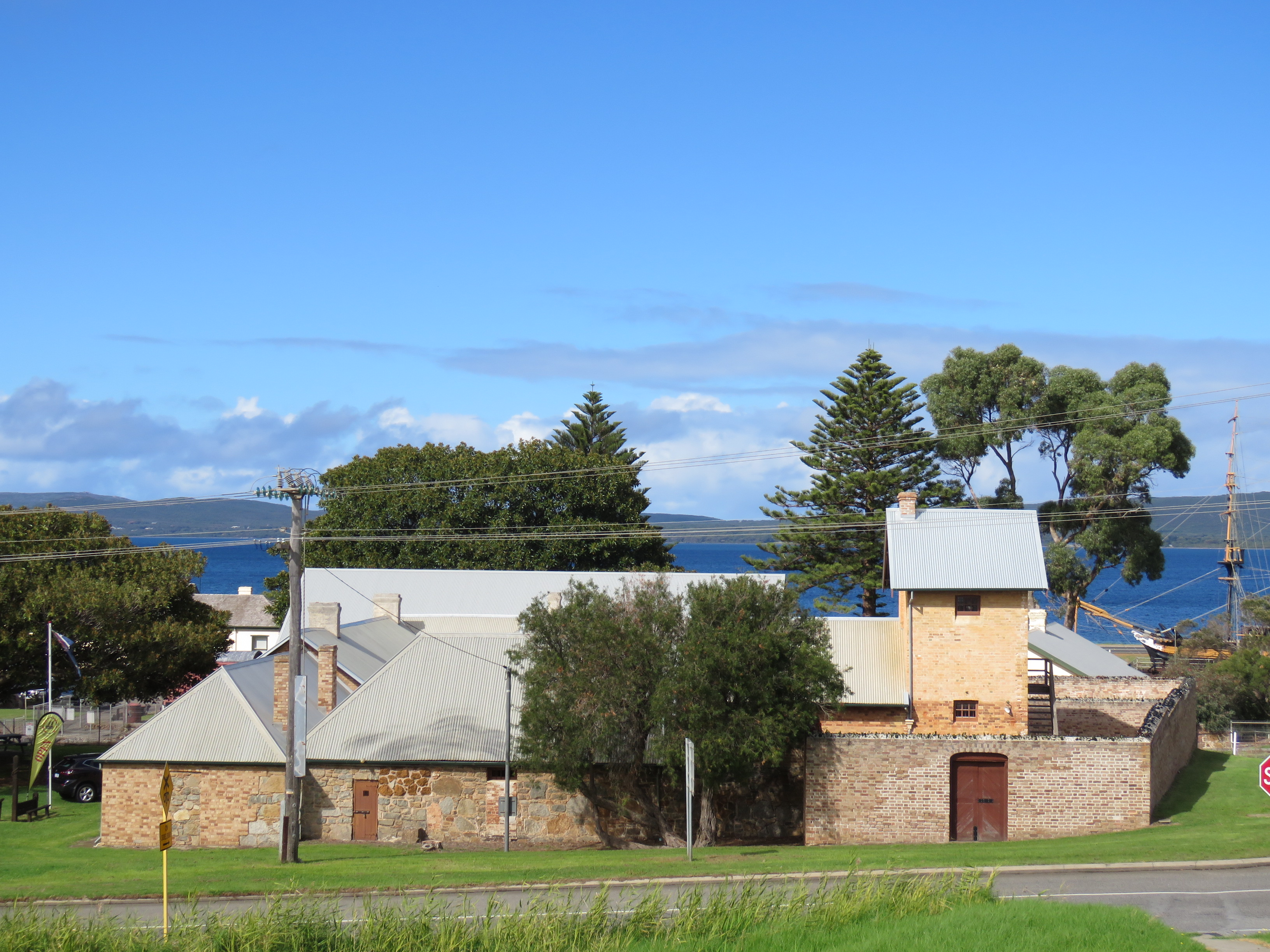
- Albany Convict Gaol seen from the north
- Established: 1852
- Location: Albany, Western Australia
- Coordinates: 35.0283°S 117.8801°E

Western Australia Heritage Register
- Type: State Registered Place
- Designated: 27 February 1996
- Reference no.: 37

Albany Convict Gaol also known as the Old Gaol is a restored jail that operates as a museum in Albany, Western Australia.

== Description ==
Buildings within the jail include the Great Hall, the warders' quarters and the cells. They are arranged around a central courtyard with a hiring depot located in the centre. The entire prison area is surrounded by 12-foot (4 m) stone walls studded with glass from broken bottles.

== History ==
The jail was established in 1852 for imperial convicts transported to Albany as skilled labourers. It initially consisted of a cell block for convicted men and quarters for the warden. The jail was built with rehabilitation as a key principle and served not only to house inmates but as a hiring depot. Convicts who were sentenced to transportation from England from between 1850 and 1868 often served their time in the jail. Many of the convicts arriving had their ticket of leave and were hired to work by the free settlers. Many worked on building the town jetty, manning the pilot boat and building the road to Perth.

The jail was extended in 1873 and became a public prison, with other buildings on the site being converted to housing for the town magistrates. Aboriginal prisoners were moved into the prison as a result of the increasing number of escapes from the town prison in Lawley Park.

In 1875, the Great Hall, the women's cells and additional quarters for the warden were built.

The jail was last used in the 1930s during the Great Depression as a police lock-up. By 1941, the jail was put up for sale by the Public Works Department, as it was declared unfit for habitation. It remained in a state of disrepair, but was restored between 1989 and 1996 to become a museum. In 2007, late night ghost tours of the jail started.

== See also ==
- List of reportedly haunted locations
- List of convict ship voyages to Western Australia
- List of places on the State Register of Heritage Places in the City of Albany
