= Royal George Hotel, Albany =

Heritage listed building in Albany, Western Australia

Royal George Hotel
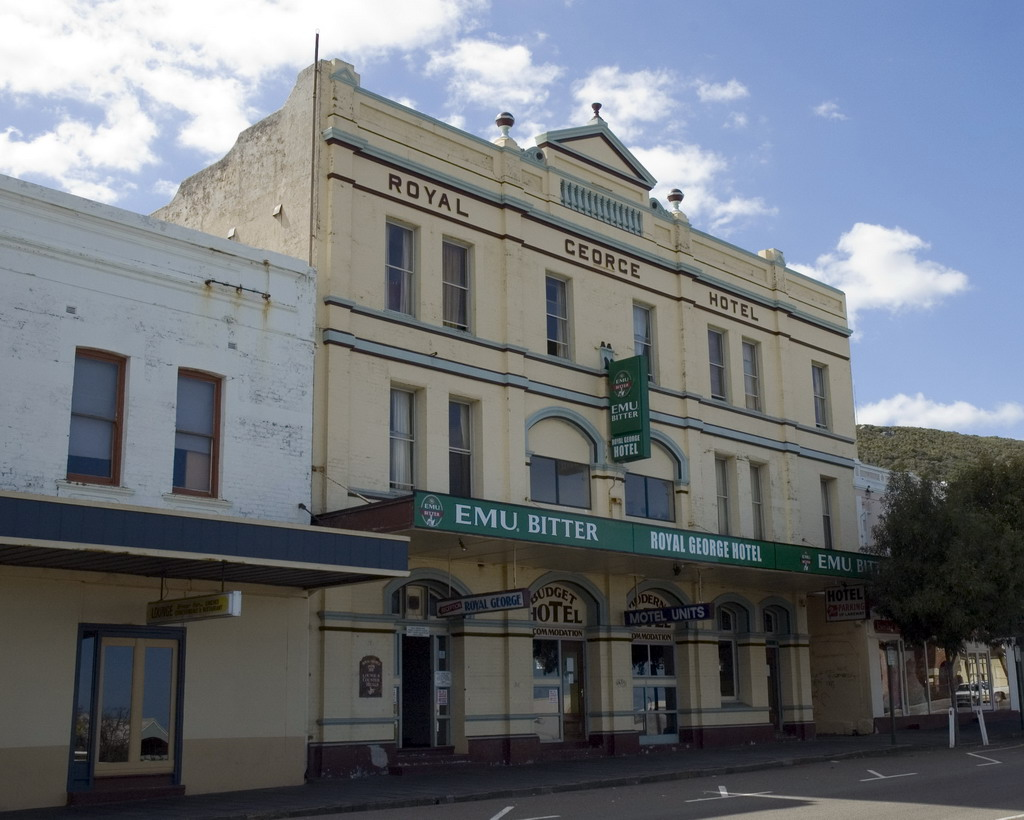
- Royal George Hotel Albany in 2006
- Interactive map of the Royal George Hotel area

General information
- Type: Heritage listed building
- Location: Albany, Western Australia, Australia
- Coordinates: 35.02705°S 117.8865°E
- Completed: 1885; 141 years ago

Western Australia Heritage Register
- Type: State Registered Place
- Designated: 7 December 2007
- Part of: Stirling Terrace Precinct, Albany (14922)
- Reference no.: 65

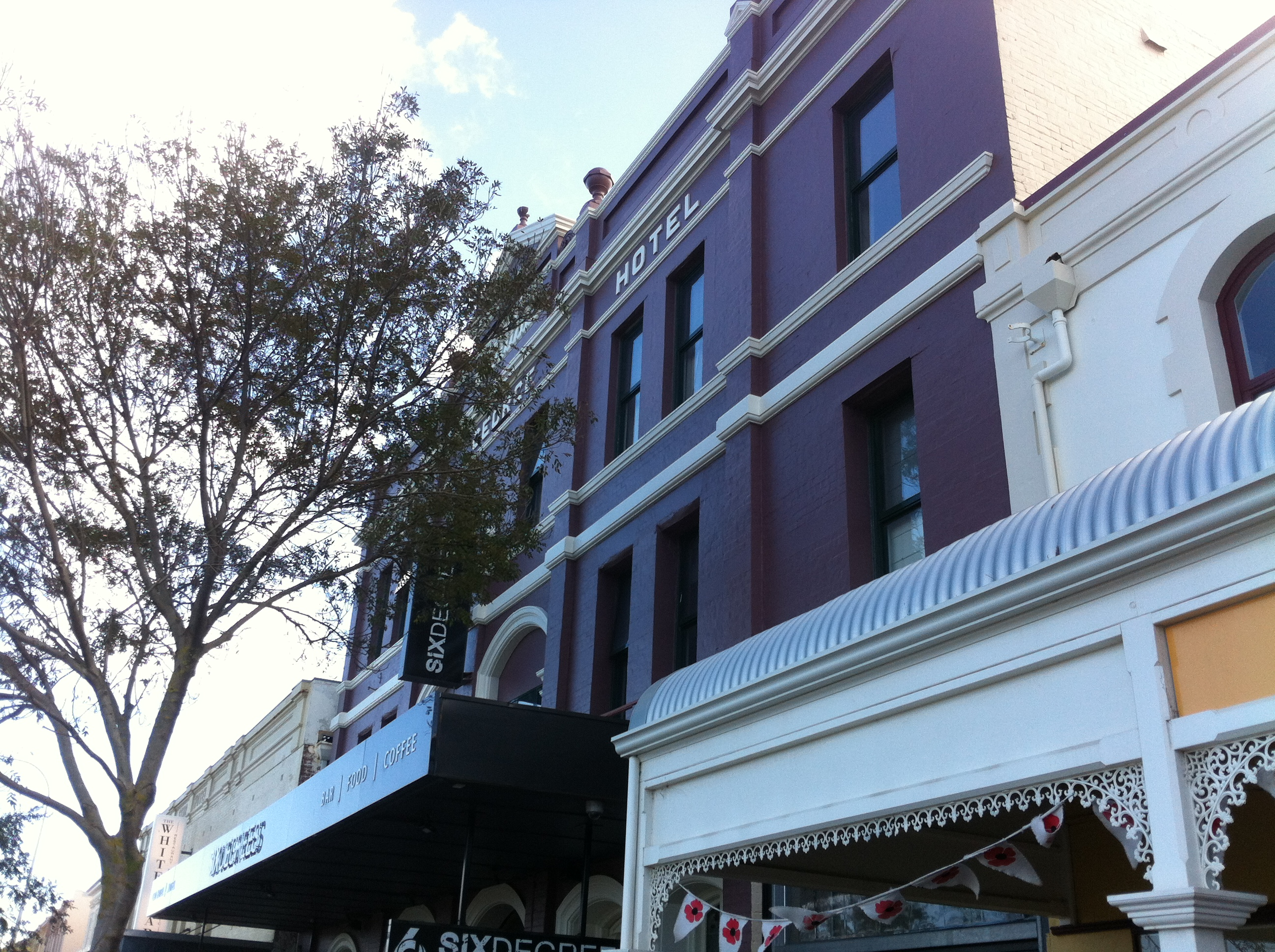
Royal George Hotel 2016

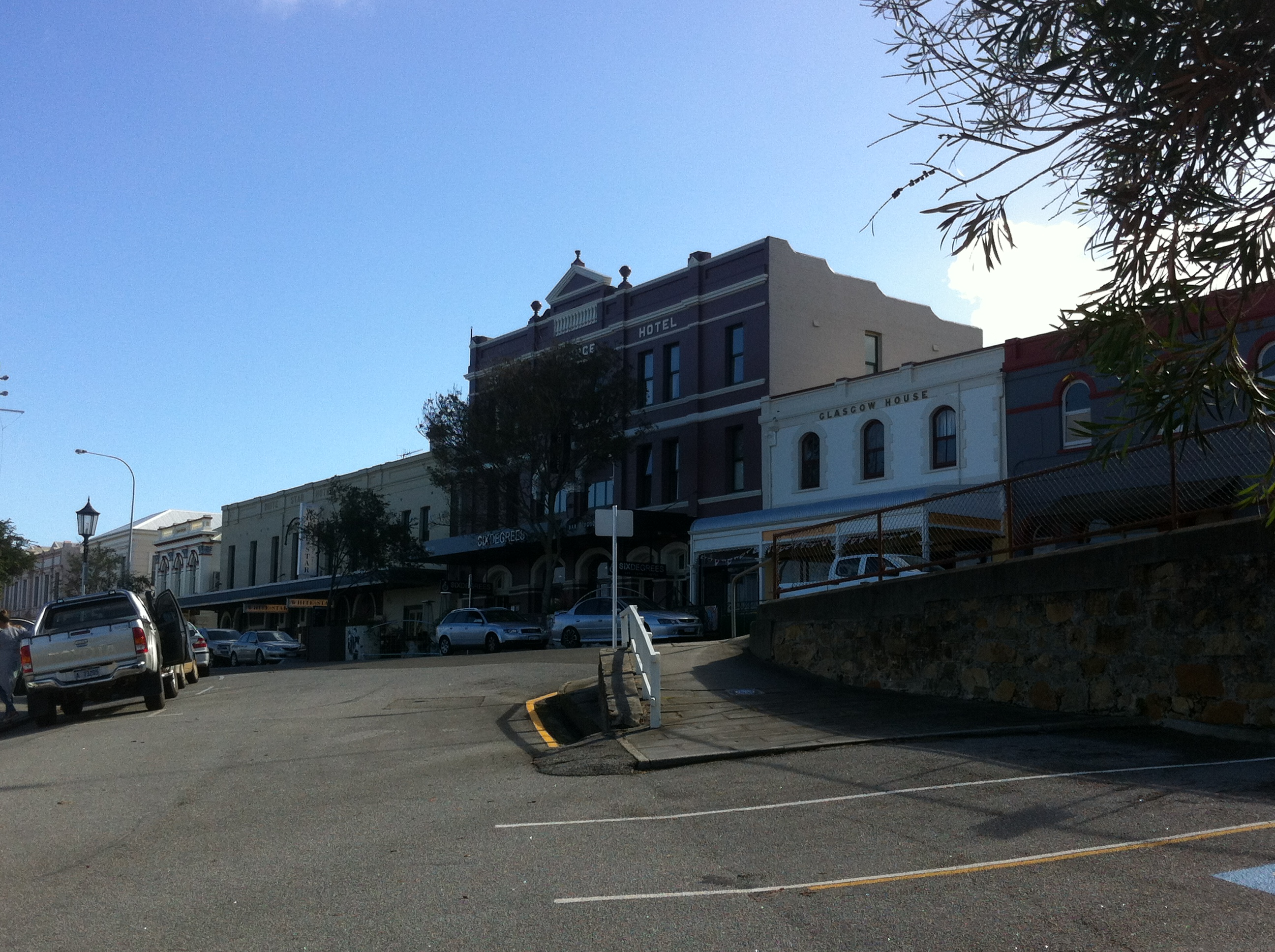
Royal George from Lower Stirling Terrace

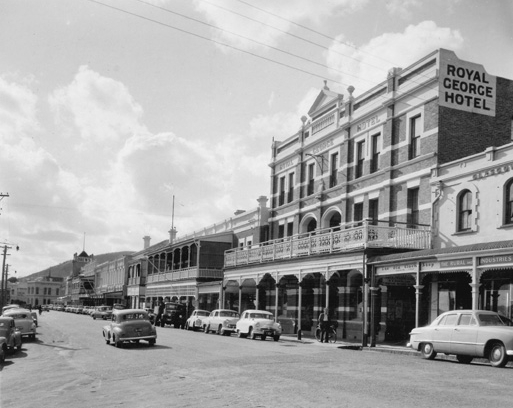
Royal George in 1954

The Royal George Hotel is a heritage listed building that operates as a hotel in Albany in the Great Southern region of Western Australia.

It is located along Stirling Terrace, overlooking Princess Royal Harbour adjacent to the White Star Hotel.

The three storey building is an example of Victorian Free Classical architecture and is part of a group of commercial buildings with an asymmetrical façade and inter-columnisation. The building has a painted rendered brick facade on the second and third storeys with painted brick below. The roof is concealed by a parapet wall with gables and classical decorative motifs. Street level windows are arched and a cantilevered box verandah provides some shade and cover.

The hotel was built in 1885, during the Western Australian goldrush of the 1890s and 1890s when thousands of prospectors arrived in Albany en route to the Kalgoorlie goldfields resulting in a building boom in Albany.

The site on which the hotel is found was where Aberdeen House, constructed prior to 1867 and the home of Alexander and Catherine Moir, once stood. Some of the house was later incorporated into the rear of the hotel. The Moir's leased the building to Frederick Watts in the mid-1880s; he then converted it to a hotel. He named it the Railway Hotel after the Great Southern Railway station that had been built just below the site. By 1892 Moir leased the hotel to Charles Bailye, who changed the name to the Royal George Hotel.

In 1897 the licensee was Edward Reynolds and the building had five sitting rooms and 22 bedrooms.

The Cremorne Gardens were once located behind the hotel. The gardens included an outdoor cinema and a roller skating rink. The gardens have since been demolished.

In 1910 work commenced on extensions to the hotel. The top storey was added along with a front balcony with cast iron lacework. The walls were made of tuck-pointed brickwork with stucco bands and sills. The first floor level had 18 bedrooms, 5 bathrooms and toilets and a sitting room. The second floor had 13 bedrooms with 2 baths and toilets. The bar facilities took up the ground floor.

The balcony has since been removed and replaced with a cantilevered box verandah.

Guests had to be evacuated when a fire broke out in one of the rooms in 2005, causing A$35,000 worth of damage.

In 2014 a heritage grant was awarded to the Royal George and other heritage buildings for work such as painting and repairs to facades, brickwork and windows as part of Anzac Centenary commemorations.

== See also ==
- List of places on the State Register of Heritage Places in the City of Albany
