= White Star Hotel =

Historic hotel building in Albany, Western Australia

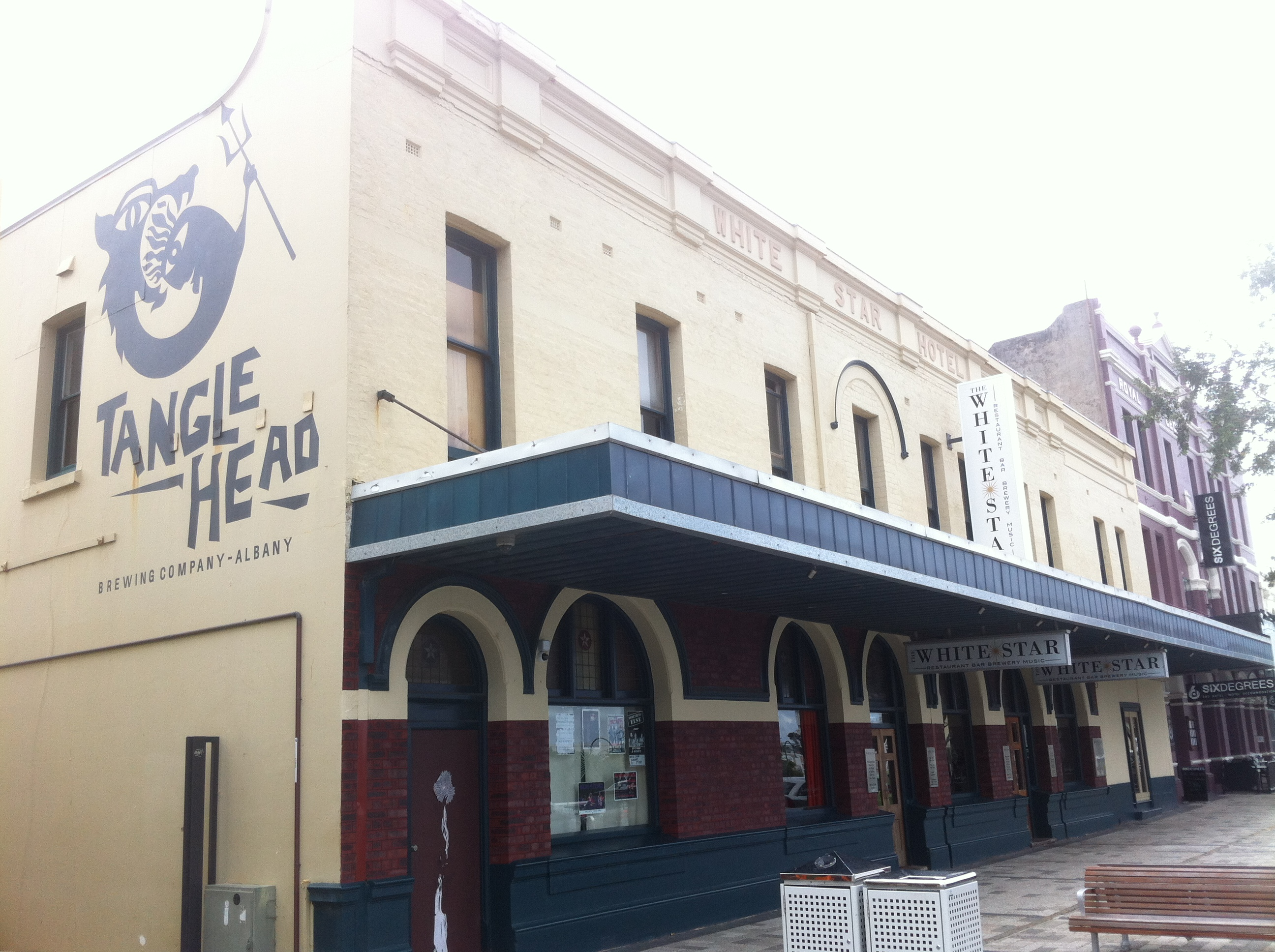
- White Star Hotel from Stirling Terrace
- Interactive map of the White Star Hotel area

General information
- Type: Heritage listed building
- Location: Albany, Western Australia
- Coordinates: 35.0268°S 117.8861°E

Western Australia Heritage Register
- Type: State Registered Place
- Designated: 7 December 2007
- Part of: Stirling Terrace Precinct, Albany (14922)
- Reference no.: 67

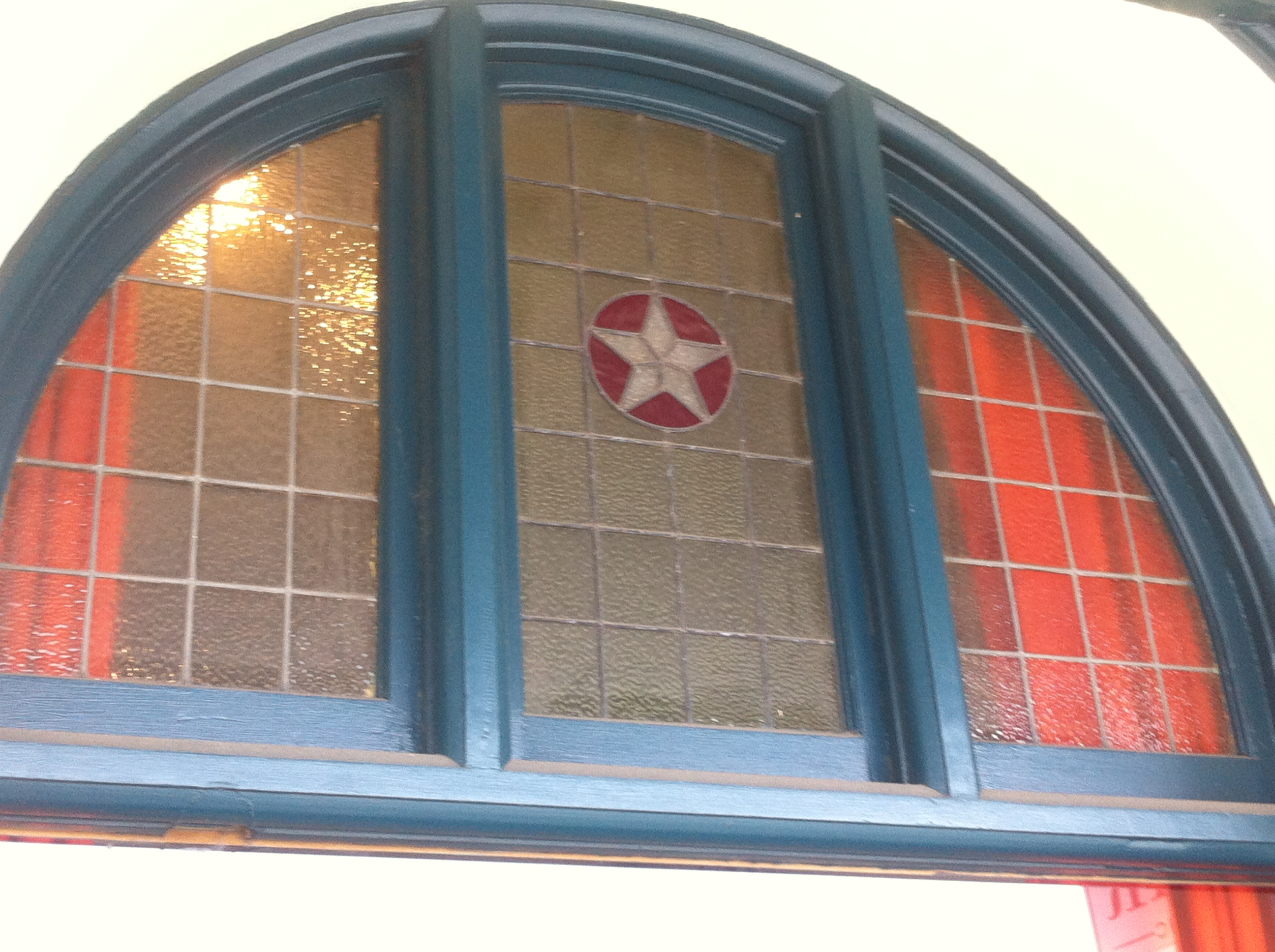
White star motif in hotel window

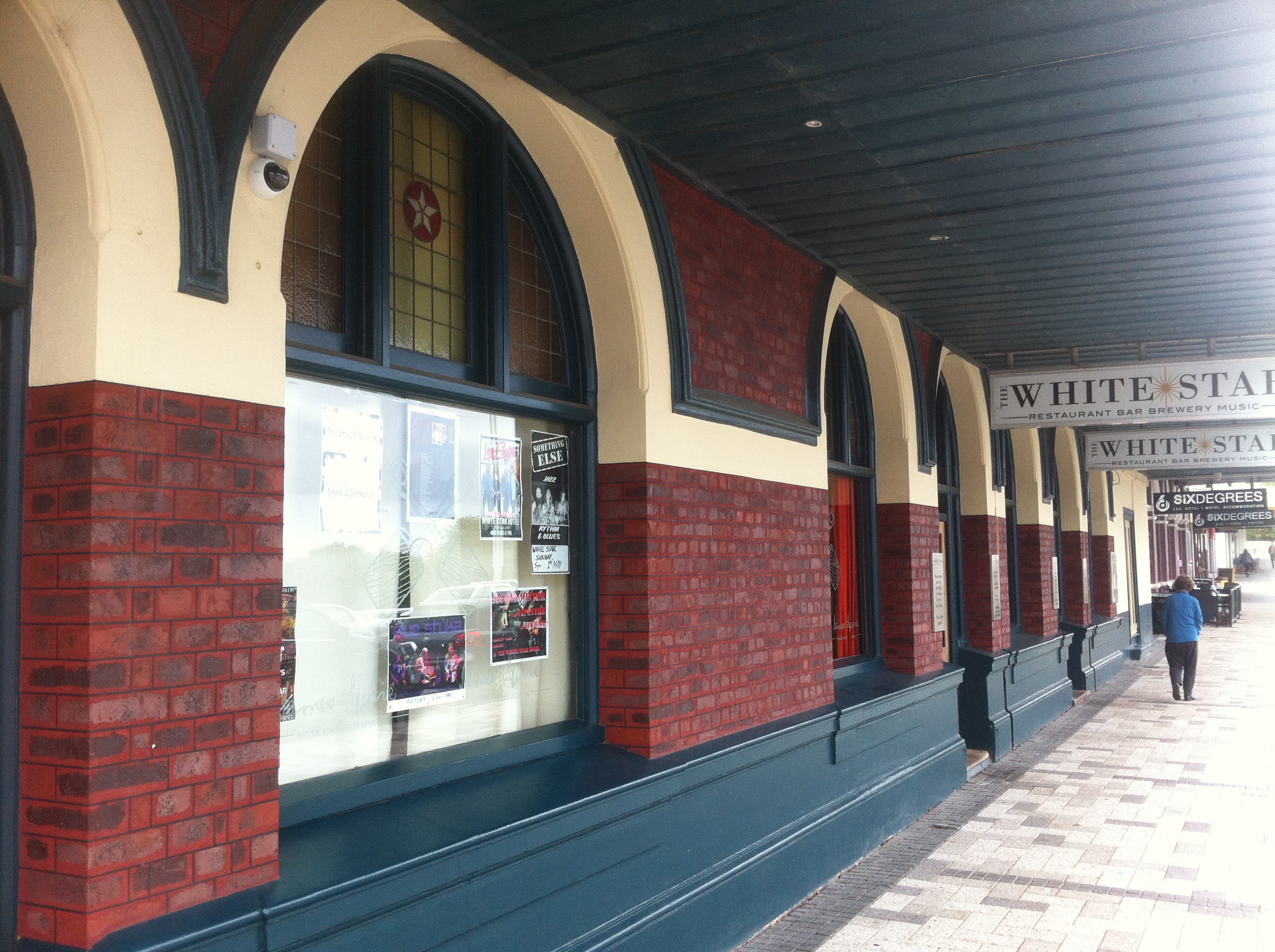
Window arches and brickwork

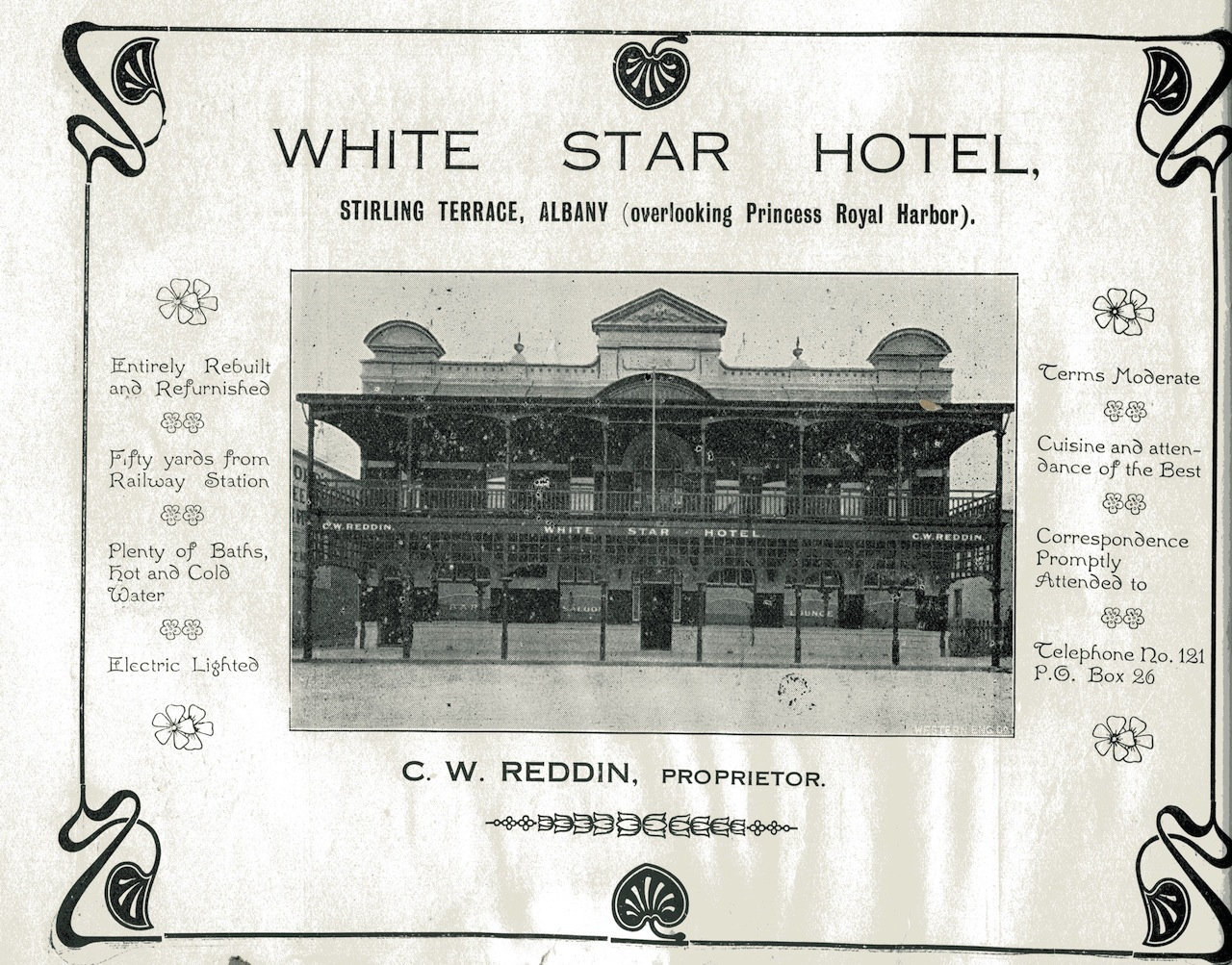
1912 advertisement in "Alluring Albany"

White Star Hotel is a heritage listed building that operates as a hotel in Albany in the Great Southern region of Western Australia. The hotel is located adjacent to the Royal George Hotel on Stirling Terrace, once the commercial and social centre of town, overlooking Princess Royal Harbour. The building was named for the White Star Line, an important shipping and passenger line that once operated out of Albany.

The current building was completed in 1910, built on the site of the former White Hart Hotel that was built in 1906 and demolished in 1910 to make way for the new hotel. Charles William Reddin owned and managed the hotel at this time. After being rebuilt the two storey building contained twenty-two bedrooms and various other common rooms and a large dining room. The downstairs area contained a larger dining room and the bar area, with large arched windows facing onto Stirling Terrace. The Stirling Terrace side of the building had a balcony with intricate timber balustrades.

Reddin was still the hotel proprietor in 1916 but by 1919 George Marques was the proprietor.

Clarence L. Braddock took over management of the hotel in 1939 and remained there until 1943.

In 1993 the hotel was renovated again with the paint removed from the ground floor walls leaving exposed brickwork. The balcony has also been removed and replaced with a cantilevered canopy parapet.

A brewery, called Tangleheads, was opened in the hotel in 2006. The brewery's unusual name is taken from the first brewery that was opened in by John Ward in Albany in the 1860s. Although Ward's brewery was called Ward’s Windmill Brewery it was colloquially known as Tangleheads after the beer's effect on its drinkers.

In 2014 the hotel owners received a grant of A$52,788 for conservation and repairs as part of a revitalization project along Stirling Terrance in readiness for Anzac Centenary commemorations.

In 2024 the Wilson Brewing Co relocated from their previous premises in a converted nursery on the South Coast Highway to the iconic hotel.

== See also ==
- List of places on the State Register of Heritage Places in the City of Albany
