= Sealers' Oven =

Bread oven built by sealers around 1800 near Albany, Western Australia

- Interactive map of the Sealers' Oven area

General information
- Type: Man-made structure of mud and stone
- Location: Albany, Western Australia
- Coordinates: 34°53′40.6″S 118°20′02.3″E

Western Australia Heritage Register
- Type: State Registered Place
- Designated: 9 May 1997
- Reference no.: 3343

Sealers' Oven is a man-made structure of mud and stone located on Waychinicup Inlet near Albany, Western Australia. Believed to be a semi-permanent bread oven built by sealers around 1800, it predates European colonisation of Western Australia by over twenty years, and is therefore one of the state's oldest non-Indigenous artefacts.

Built on a granite outcrop about 4 metres (13 ft) above the high tide line, it is a roughly circular kiln about 1 metre (3 ft 3 in) high and 1.5 metres (4 ft 11 in) across. At the top there is an access hole about 30 centimetres (12 in) across, and there are two small ventilation holes at the base on the eastern side. It is built from granite stones, broad and flat at the bottom but somewhat larger and more circular at the top, suggesting that it may have been partially rebuilt.

Sealers' Oven has been known of since the early days of colonisation, but was neither used nor protected until 1973, when the Government of Western Australia established a twelve square metre reserve around the oven at the request of the National Trust of Australia. It was classified by the National Trust in 1977, and has been part of the Waychinicup National Park since the park's establishment in 1990. In 1997 it was placed on the Heritage Council of Western Australia's Register of Heritage Places.

== General references ==
- Heritage Council of Western Australia (1997). "Sealers' Oven" (PDF). Register of Heritage Places – Assessment Documentation.
- Heritage Council of Western Australia (2006). "Sealers' Oven". Places Database.
