= Albany Post Office =

Heritage listed building in Albany, Western Australia

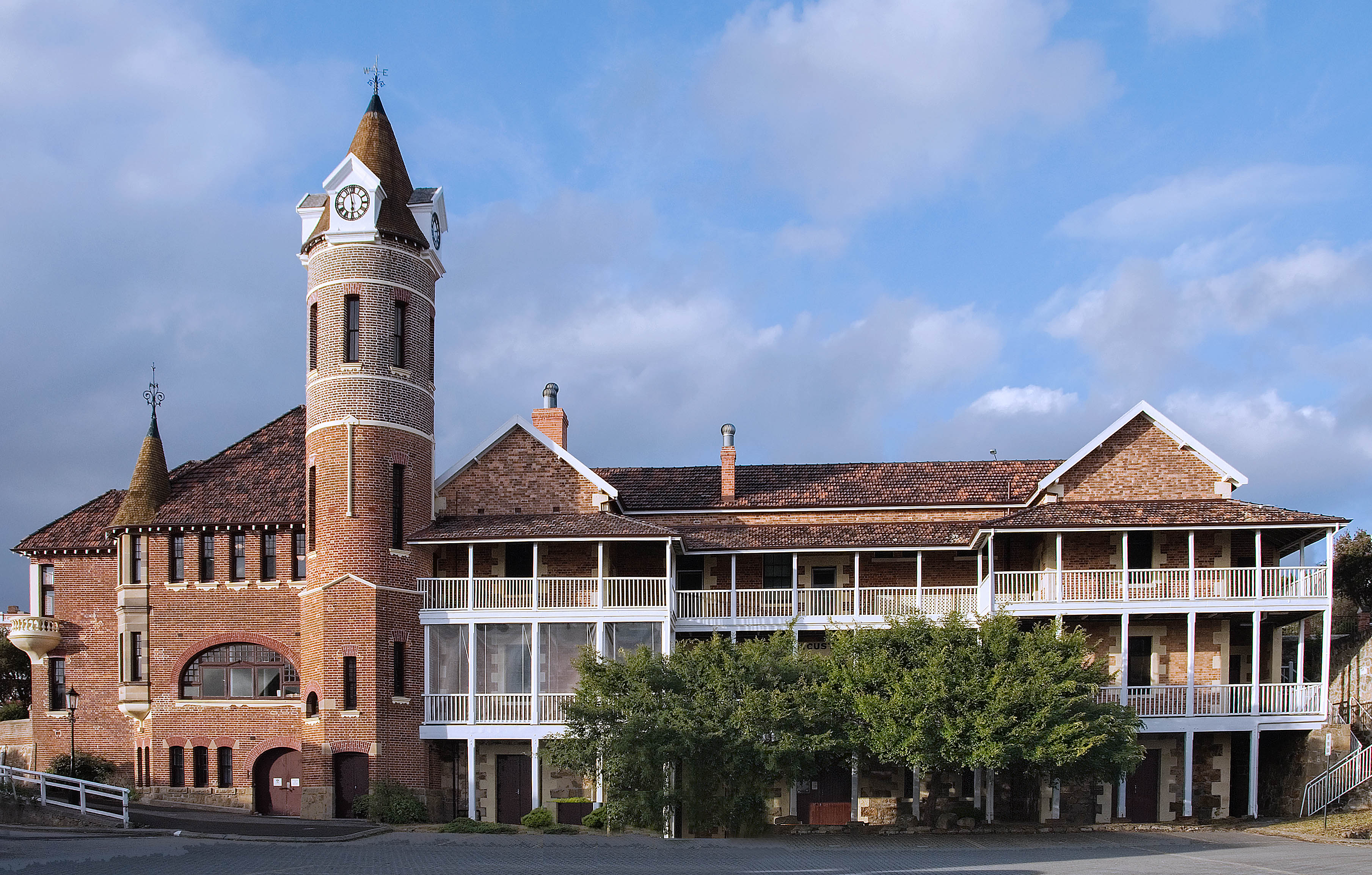
- Albany Post Office as viewed from the south

General information
- Status: Completed
- Location: 31–39 Stirling Terrace, Albany, Western Australia
- Coordinates: 35.0275°S 117.8871°E
- Current tenants: University of Western Australia; Curtin University
- Completed: 1869; 1895

Design and construction
- Architects: James Manning (1869); George Temple-Poole (1895)

Western Australia Heritage Register
- Type: State Registered Place
- Designated: 9 July 1993
- Reference no.: 30

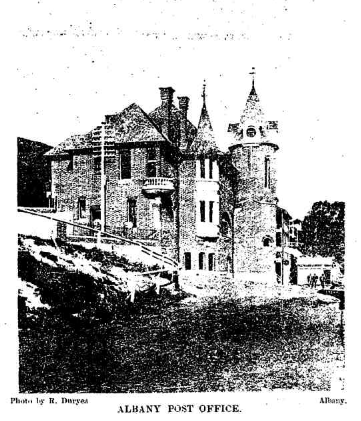
Albany Post Office 1897

Albany Post Office is a heritage site of the former post office in Albany, Western Australia. The site was also a customs office, a base station of the overland telegraph, and is noted for its architectural and historical significance. It was listed by the Register of the National Estate in 1992.

The building is situated on Stirling Terrace, opposite Spencer Street, on a multilevel site that overlooks Princess Royal Harbour.

== History ==
The main building was constructed in two stages, the first in local materials such as brick, granite and sheoak shingles, the second also included materials imported from New South Wales. The original building was completed in 1869, after requests from the Government Resident to the administration in Perth, Western Australia. Large scale site works included excavations, by convict labour, and a large granite retaining wall up to 1.5 metres (5 ft) thick. The design by James Manning, the clerk of works, now forms the eastern section of the building. The functions of the region's first government building included postal, judicial, customs, and a meeting place for the road board and local government.

The second phase of construction, completed in 1895, was to a design of the government architect George Temple-Poole. It was an extension that was sympathetic to the earlier building, incorporating the same local materials, and successfully accommodating its multileveled situation. The granite, brick, and sheoak shingles, were used again, freestone, bluestone, and cedar was imported. A clock tower was included in the western extension, four clockfaces 1.2 metres (4 ft) across, with a spiral staircase. The steps of this staircase are supported by the outer wall, each atop the previous, in the flying style of Palladio. The tower was extended 6.1 metres (20 ft) in 1901 to increase the drop required by the weight-driven clocks, this increased its height to 26 metres (84 ft). Wooden shingles were retained on the tower when the roof was later replaced by terracotta tiles.

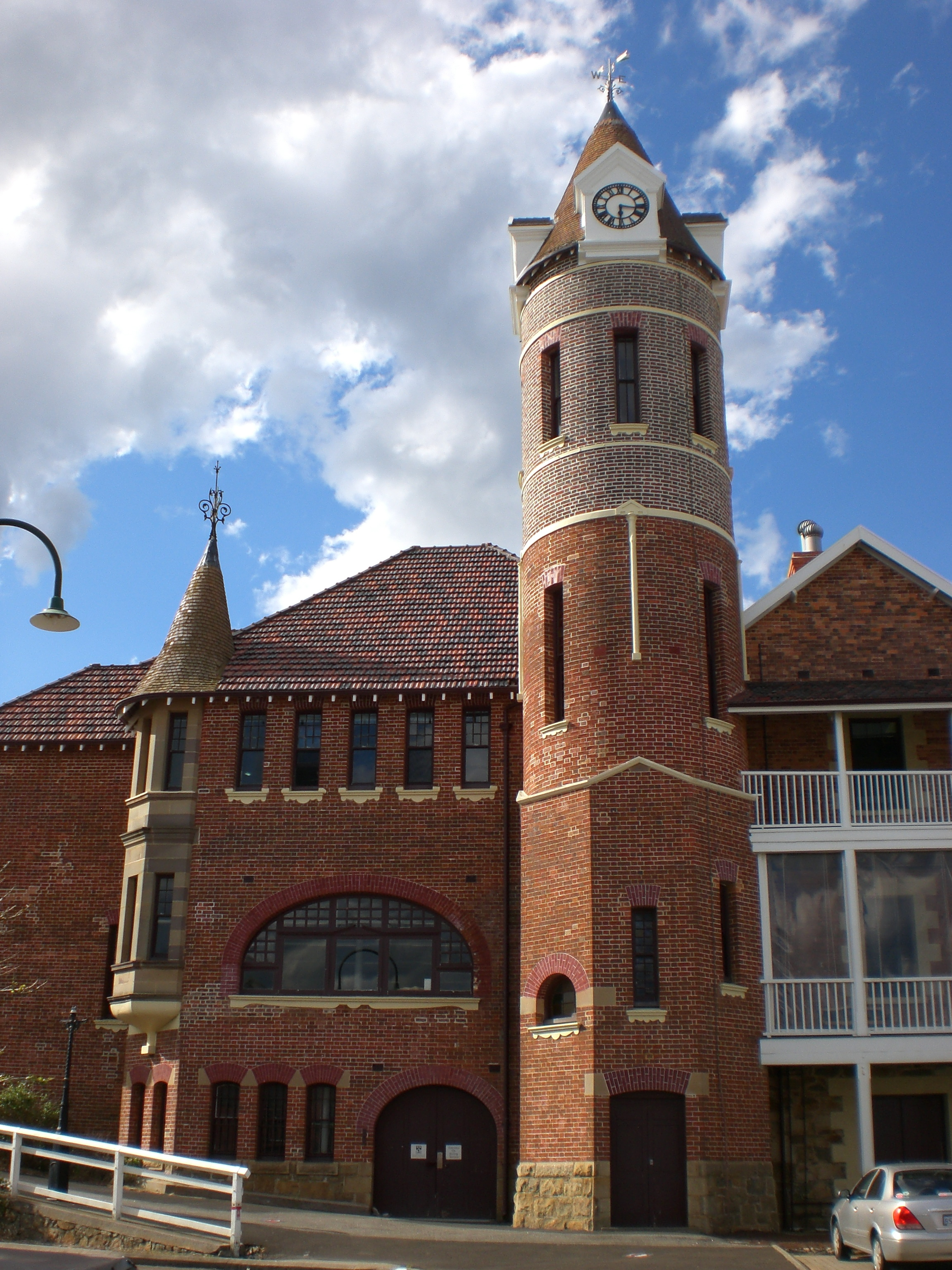
The clock tower

The court house occupying the top floor was moved to a new building, also by Poole, in 1898. A telegraph to Perth was established in 1871 and in 1875 the office provided the link to the worldwide network. The first telegraph pole was ceremoniously placed by Governor Weld, where it remains on a monument commemorating the engineering milestone. A telephone exchange was housed in the building in 1895. The function as a post office continued until 1964, when it was moved to York Street, and the property was taken over by local government. The building had various functions in the period following this, as public hall, museum, and as a restaurant.

The listing by the National Trust of Australia in 1977 inspired restorations to the heritage site. It was placed on the Register of Heritage Places in Australia in 1993. The City of Albany and the University of Western Australia (UWA) raised funds from state and federal sources to renovate the site, adapting it to become the Albany campus for UWA and Curtin University. This was officially opened in 2002.

== See also ==
- List of places on the State Register of Heritage Places in the City of Albany

== General references ==
- "Albany Post Office (former) (Place ID 9299)". Australian Heritage Database. Australian Government.
- Oldham, Ray; John Oldham; Tish Phillips (drawings) (1980). Western heritage. Part 2. George Temple-Poole, architect of the golden years, 1885-1897. Nedlands, W. A.: University of Western Australia Press, 1980. ISBN 0-85564-173-8.
- Swain, Judith (2008). "The Old Post Office and early postal services". Newsletter. Albany Historical Society. Archived from the original on 13 September 2009.

== Sources ==
- Sheil, Melissa (30 October 2026). "Albany 2026: One of WA's oldest government buildings, the Old Post Office served many purposes". Albany Advertiser.
