= History of Norfolk Island =

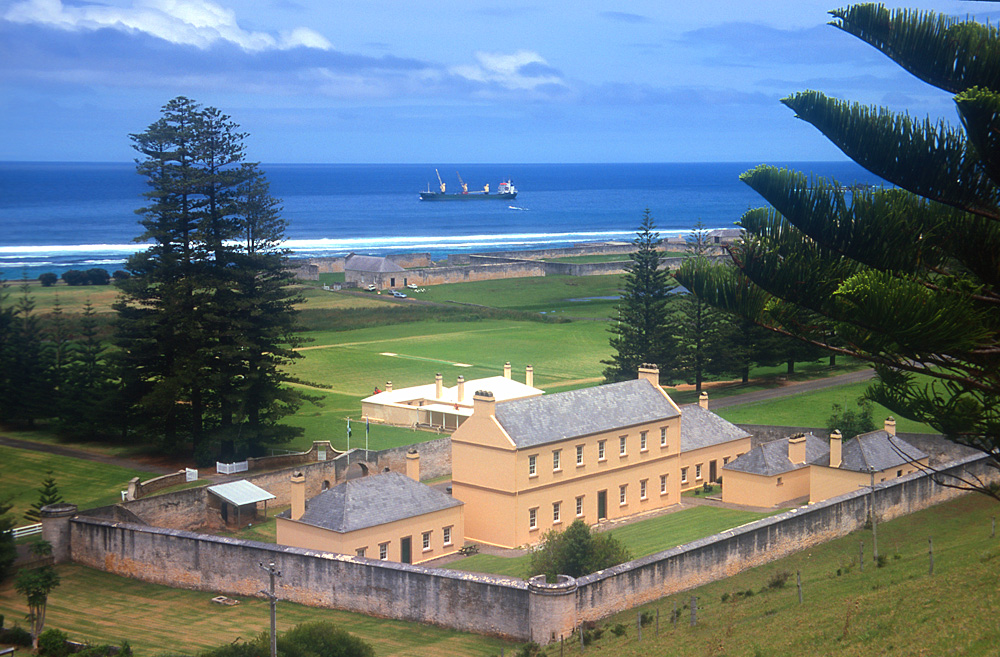
The Norfolk Island convict settlement today

Human settlements on Norfolk Island date back to the fourteenth or fifteenth century CE when Polynesian seafarers arrived.

== Early history ==
Norfolk Island was first settled by East Polynesian seafarers either from the Kermadec Islands north of New Zealand or from the North Island of New Zealand. They arrived in the fourteenth or fifteenth century, and survived for several generations before disappearing. Their main village site has been excavated at Emily Bay, and they also left behind stone tools, the Polynesian rat, and banana trees as evidence of their sojourn. They also brought the harakeke (Phormium tenax), or New Zealand flax plant, to Norfolk Island, either directly from New Zealand or from Raoul Island (Sunday Island). The flax has no relation to the European flax but is related to the daylily and other genera within the sub-family Hemerocallidaceae. The final fate of the early settlers remains a mystery.

The first European known to have sighted the island was Captain James Cook, in 1774. It was Cook's second voyage to the South Pacific on HMS Resolution, and he named the island after the Duchess of Norfolk (c. 1712–1773). The Duchess was dead at the time of the island's sighting by Cook, but Cook had set out from England in 1772 and could not have known of her death in May of 1773.

Cook went ashore on Tuesday 11 October 1774 and is said to have been impressed with the tall straight trees and New Zealand flax plants, which, although not related to the Northern Hemisphere flax plants after which they are named, produce fibres of economic importance. He took samples back to Britain and reported on their potential uses for the Royal Navy.

Andrew Kippis as the biographer of this voyage puts it as follows:

As the Resolution pursued her course from New Caledonia, land was discovered, which, on a nearer approach, was found to be an island, of good height, and five leagues in circuit. Captain Cook named it Norfolk Isle, in honour of the noble family of Howard (Fn.: It is situated in the latitude of 29° 2' 30" south, and in the longitude of 168° 16' east). It was uninhabited; and the first persons that ever set foot on it were unquestionably our English navigators. Various trees and plants were observed that are common at New Zealand; and in particular, the flax plant, which is rather more luxuriant here than in any other part of that country. The chief produce of the island is a kind of spruce pine, exceedingly straight and tall, which grows in great abundance. Such is the size of many of the trees that, breast high, they are as thick as two men can fathom. Among the vegetables of the place, the palm-cabbage afforded both a wholesome and palatable refreshment; and, indeed, proved the most agreeable repast that our people had for a considerable time enjoyed...

The cabbage palm referred to is a cabbage tree species Cordyline obtecta, also found in New Zealand, the edible heart of which resembles a small cabbage. At the time, Britain was heavily dependent on flax (Linum usitatissimum) (for sails) and hemp (Cannabis sp.) (for ropes) from the shores of the Baltic Sea ports. Any threat to their supply endangered Britain's sea power. The UK also relied on timbers from New England for mainmasts, and these were not supplied after the American War of Independence. The alternative source of Norfolk Island for these (or in the case of flax and hemp, and similar) supplies is argued by some historians, notably by Geoffrey Blainey in Tyranny of Distance, as being a major reason for the founding of the convict settlement of New South Wales by the First Fleet in 1788.

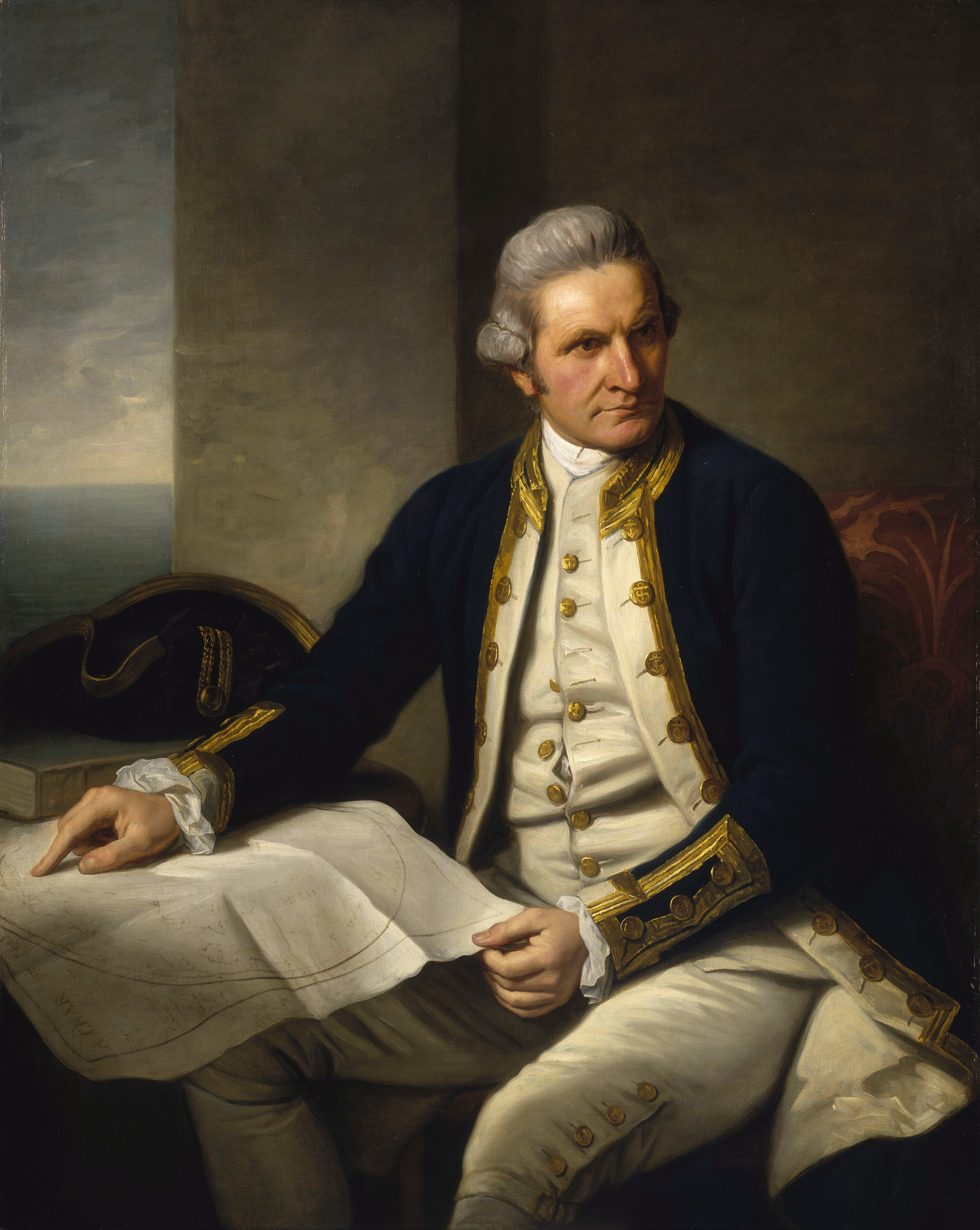
Portrait of James Cook by Nathaniel Dance-Holland, 1775

James Cook said that,

"except for New Zealand, in no other island in the South Sea was wood and mast-timber so ready to hand".

Sir John Call, Member of Parliament, member of the Royal Society, and former chief engineer of the East India Company, stated the advantages of Norfolk Island in a proposal for colonisation he put to the Home Office in August 1784:

"This Island has an Advantage not common to New Caledonia, New Holland and New Zealand by not being inhabited, so that no Injury can be done by possessing it to the rest of Mankind…there seems to be nothing wanting but Inhabitants and Cultivation to make it a delicious Residence. The Climate, Soil, and Sea provide everything that can be expected from them. The Timber, Shrubs, Vegetables and Fish already found there need no Embellishment to pronounce them excellent samples; but the most invaluable of all is the Flax-plant, which grows more luxuriant than in New Zealand."

George Forster, who had been on Cook's second voyage to the Pacific and had been with him when he landed on Norfolk Island, was at the time professor of natural history at the University of Vilna (or Vilnius) in Polish Lithuania: Forster discussed the proposed Botany Bay colony in an article written in November 1786, "Neuholland, und die brittische Colonie in Botany Bay". Though unaware of the British intention to settle Norfolk Island, which was not announced until 5 December 1786, Forster referred to "the nearness of New Zealand; the excellent flax plant (Phormium) that grows so abundantly there; its incomparable shipbuilding timber" as among the advantages of the new colony.

The proposal written by James Matra under the supervision of Sir Joseph Banks for establishing a settlement in New South Wales, stated that Botany Bay was: "no further than a fortnight from New Zealand, which is covered with timber even to the water's edge". The trees are immensely big and tall that a single tree is enough to make a mast of a first rate man of war. New Zealand, in addition, produces flax, which is an object of utility and curiosity. Any quantity of it might be raised in the colony, as this plant grows naturally in New Zealand. It can be made to serve the various purposes of cotton, hemp and linen, and is easier manufactured than any of them. In naval affairs, it exhibited great strength which is why it was regarded to be of utmost importance; a cable of ten inches (250 mm) was supposed to be of equal strength and durability to one of European hemp of eighteen inches.

In 1786, the British government included Norfolk Island as an auxiliary settlement, as proposed by John Call, in its plan for colonisation of New South Wales. The flax and ship timber of New Zealand were attractive, but these prospective advantages were balanced by the obvious impossibility of forming a settlement there in the face of undoubted opposition from the native Maori. There was no native population to oppose a settlement on Norfolk Island, which also possessed those desirable natural resources, but the island was too small to sustain a colony, hence the ultimate decision for a dual colonisation along the lines, proposed by Call.

The decision to settle Norfolk Island was taken under the impetus of the shock Britain had just received from Empress Catherine II of Russia. Practically all the hemp and flax required by the Royal Navy for cordage and sailcloth was imported from the Russian dominions through the ports of St. Petersburg (Kronstadt) and Riga. Comptroller of the Navy Sir Charles Middleton explained to Prime Minister Pitt in a letter on 5 September 1786: "It is for Hemp only we are dependent on Russia. Masts can be procured from Nova Scotia, and Iron in plenty from the Ores of this Country; but as it is impracticable to carry on a Naval War without Hemp, it is materially necessary to promote the growth of it in this Country and Ireland". In the summer of 1786, the Empress Catherine, in the context of tense negotiations on a renewed treaty of commerce, had emphasised her control over this vital commodity by asking the merchants who supplied it to restrict sales to English buyers: "the Empress has contrary to Custom speculated on this Commodity", complained the author of a subsequent memorandum to the Home Secretary. "It is unnecessary", said the memorandum, "to remark the Consequences which might result from a prohibition of supply from that Quarter altogether". This implicit threat to the viability of the Royal Navy became apparent in mid-September (a month after the decision had been taken to settle Botany Bay) and caused the Pitt Administration to begin an urgent search for new sources of supply, including from Norfolk Island, which was then added to the plan to colonise New South Wales.

The need for an alternative non-Russian source of naval stores is indicated by the information from the British Ambassador in Copenhagen, Hugh Elliott, who wrote to Foreign Secretary, Lord Carmarthen on 12 August 1788:

"There is no Topick so common in the Mouths of the Russian Ministers, as to insist on the Facility with which the Empress, when Mistress of the Baltic, either by Conquest, Influence, or Alliance with the other two Northern Powers, could keep England in a State of Dependence for its Baltic Commerce and Naval Stores".

On 6 December 1786, an Order in Council was issued, designating "the Eastern Coast of New South Wales, or some one or other of the Islands adjacent" as the destination for transported convicts, as required by the Transportation, etc. Act 1784 (24 Geo. 3. Sess. 2. c. 56) that authorised the sending of convicted felons to any place appointed by the King in Council. Norfolk Island was thereby brought officially within the bounds of the projected colony.

An article in The Daily Universal Register (the forerunner of The Times) of 23 December 1786 revealed the plan for a dual colonisation of Norfolk Island and Botany Bay:

"The ships for Botany Bay are not to leave all the convicts there; some of them are to be taken to Norfolk Island, which is about eight hundred miles East of Botany Bay, and about four hundred miles short of New Zealand".

The advantage of Britain's new colony in providing a non-Russian source of flax and hemp for naval supplies was referred to in an article in Lloyd's Evening Post of 5 October 1787 which urged: "It is undoubtedly the interest of Great-Britain to remain neutral in the present contest between the Russians and the Turks" and observed, "Should England cease to render her services to the Empress of Russia, in a war against the Turks, there can be little of nothing to fear from her ill-will. England will speedily be enabled to draw from her colony of New South Wales, the staple of Russia, hemp and flax."

== First penal settlement ==
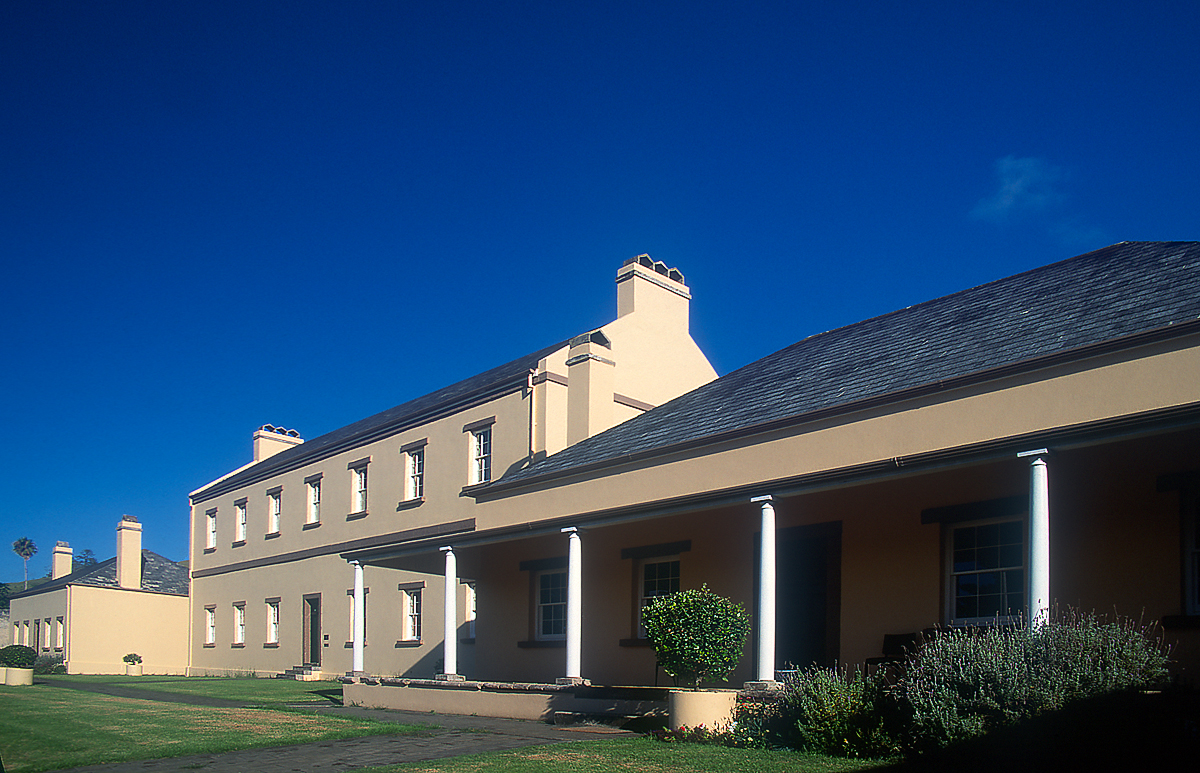
Convict buildings

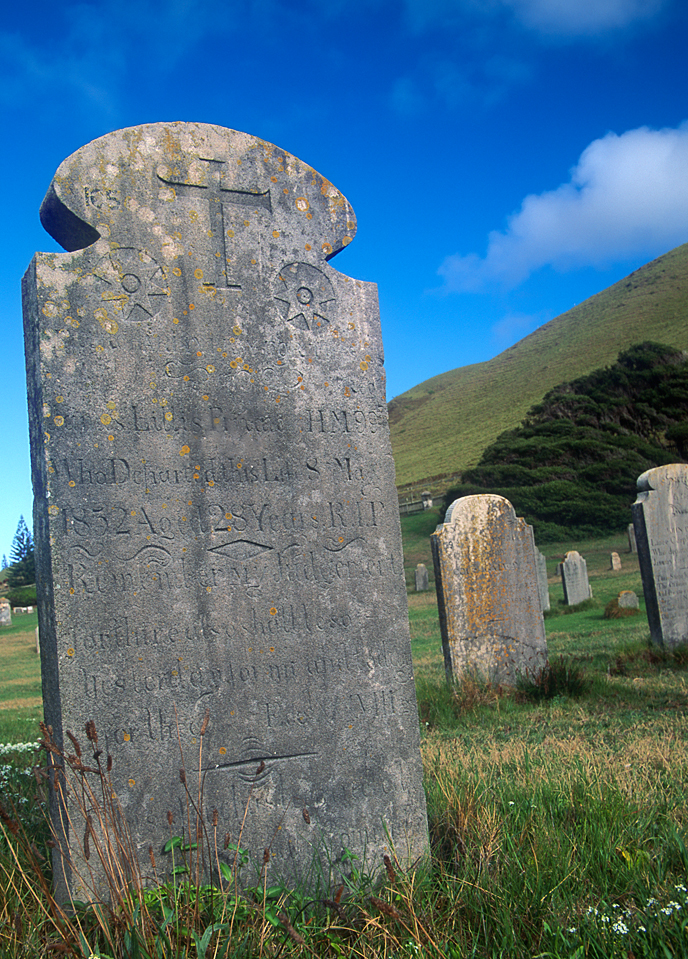
Gravestone of a convict

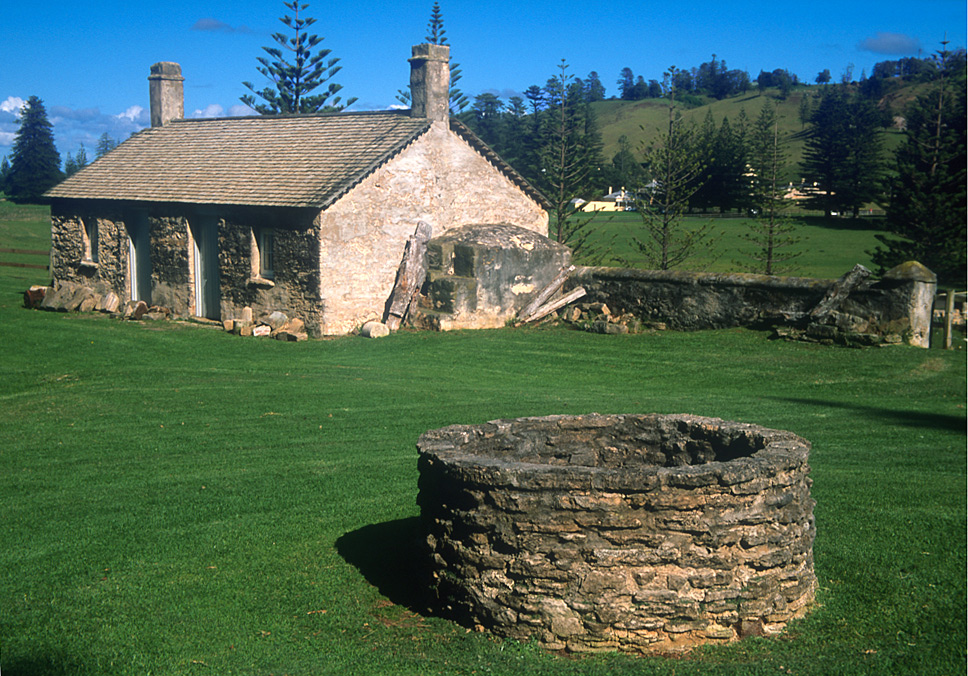
Norfolk Island jail

Governor Arthur Phillip's instructions, given to him in April 1787, included an injunction to send a party to secure Norfolk Island "as soon as Circumstances may admit of it…. to prevent its being occupied by the Subjects of any other European Power". This could only have been a reference to the expedition then in the Pacific commanded by Jean-François de Galaup, comte de La Pérouse. The Daily Universal Register of 11 November 1786 had stated: "the Botany Bay scheme is laid aside, as there is a strong presumption that a squadron from Brest are now, or soon will be, in possession of the very spot we meant to occupy in New Holland". This may have been a reference to a report from the British Ambassador in Paris, who had believed that when La Pérouse's expedition set out from Brest in August 1785 it had as one of its objectives the establishment of a settlement in New Zealand to forestall the British.

La Pérouse did attempt to visit Norfolk Island, but only to investigate, not to take possession. He had instructions to investigate any colonies the British may have established, and in the process learned of the intention to settle Botany Bay and Norfolk Island, from despatches sent to him from Paris through St. Petersburg as well as by land across Siberia to Petropavlovsk in Kamchatka, all of which he received on 26 September 1787, just four days before his departure from the port. His ships, the Boussole and Astrolabe, anchored off the northern side of the island on 13 January 1788, but at the time high seas were running, which made it too dangerous for the two ships' boats that were put out to attempt a landing: "It was obvious that I would have had to wait maybe for a very long time for a moment suitable for a landing and a visit to this island was not worth this sacrifice", he recorded in his journal. Having noted that the island was still uninhabited, he was presumably the less inclined to risk a landing when there was no British settlement there to report on.

When the First Fleet arrived at Port Jackson in January 1788, Phillip ordered Lieutenant Philip Gidley King to lead a party of 15 convicts and seven free men, including surgeon Thomas Jamison (the future Principal Surgeon of New South Wales), to take control of the island and prepare for its commercial development. They arrived on 6 March 1788.

During the first year of the settlement, which was also called "Sydney" like its parent, more convicts and soldiers were sent to the island from New South Wales. A second village was started at Ball Bay, named after the captain of HMS Supply, Lieutenant Henry Lidgbird Ball. On 8 January 1789, the first child was born, Norfolk King, the son of Philip Gidley King and a convict, Ann Inett. Norfolk King went on to become the first British Naval officer born in Australia, and was a Lieutenant, commanding the schooner Ballahoo when an American privateer captured her.

The "Letter from an Officer of Marines at New South Wales, 16 November 1788", published in the London newspaper, The World on 15 May 1789, reported the glowing description of the island and its prospects by Philip Gidley King, but also drew attention to the fatal defect of the lack of a safe port: "The said Island lies near Port Jackson, and is nearly as large as the Isle of Wight. Lieutenant King, who was sent with a detachment of marines and some convicts, to settle there, gives the most flattering portrayal of it. The island is fully wooded. Its timber is in the opinion of everyone the most beautiful and finest in the world...they are most suitable for masts, yards, spars and such. The New Zealand flax-plant grows there in abundance. European grains and seeds also thrive wonderfully well on Norfolk Island. It only lacks a good port and suitable landing places, without which the island is of no use, but with them it would be of the greatest importance for Great Britain. How far these deficiencies can be improved by art and the hand of man, time must decide."

An idealised vision of the new British settlement was given in the novel by Therese Forster, Abentheuer auf einer Reise nach Neu-Holland [Adventures on a Voyage to New Holland], published in the German women's magazine, Flora for 1793 and 1794:

We went towards the centre of this small island where at the foot of a round hill a crystal-clear river rushes forth, dividing up further on into several arms. Towards North and West the hill is covered with the most beautiful ploughed fields all the way down to the sea. The sight of these great flax fields is one of the loveliest I ever beheld. The slender stalks, of the most beautiful green and reaching far above a man's head, bent in the gentle breeze that blew from the sea. Their red blossoms, shining like rubies, danced in the green waves. The top of the hill and the whole of the south and east sides are covered with enormous pines whose dark green is enhanced by a pleasant foreground of cabbage palms and banana trees, and I also observed a low bush among them the fruit of which resembles our red currants but is much larger and hangs in purple and red clusters that help to give the whole a gay appearance. The dwellings of the colonists are strewn along the fringes of the forest and from my post I could see several of them. Simple houses surrounded by barns and stalls and the fields all enclosed with hedges give the region a youthful appearance the like of which is rarely found in Europe. And plants here bloom more luxuriantly and more perfectly with a natural vigour that knows no exhaustion and fears no poverty, a vigour that has disappeared from our continent.

More convicts were sent, and the island was seen as a farm, supplying Sydney with grain and vegetables during its early years of near-starvation. However, crops often failed due to the salty wind, rats, and caterpillars. The lack of a natural safe harbour hindered communication and the transport of supplies and produce.

Manning Clark observed that "at first the convicts behaved well, but as more arrived from Sydney Cove, they renewed their wicked practices". These included an attempted overthrowing of King in January 1789 by convicts, described by Margaret Hazzard as "incorrigible rogues who took his 'goodwill' for weakness". While some convicts responded well to the opportunities offered to them to become respectable, most remained "idle and miserable wretches" according to Clark, despite the climate and their isolation from previous haunts of crime.

The impending starvation at Sydney led to a great transplantation of convicts and marines to Norfolk Island in March 1790 on HMS Sirius. This attempt to relieve the pressure on Sydney turned to disaster when Sirius was wrecked and, although there was no loss of life, some stores were destroyed, and the ship's crew was marooned for ten months. This news was met in Sydney with "unspeakable consternation". Norfolk Island was now further cut off from Sydney which, with the arrival of the Second Fleet with its cargo of sick and abused convicts, had more pressing problems with which to contend.

In spite of this the settlement grew slowly as more convicts were sent from Sydney. Many convicts chose to remain as settlers on the expiry of their sentence, and the population grew to over 1,000 by 1792. Norfolk Island, in 1793, was described by Josef Espinosa y Tello, an officer of the Spanish expedition led by Alessandro Malaspina that visited New South Wales:

The colony of Norfolk, settled shortly after that at Port Jackson, merits little attention both because of the small size of that island and because of the hilly nature of its terrain, and the particular circumstance of its lacking entirely an anchorage or a place where longboats can be drawn up with any security. Despite this, some 1,500 persons live there, and its fertile soil produces copiously all kinds of grains, although the difficulty of clearing the ground covered with trees and undergrowth retards the large harvests which the fertility of the land would yield without that obstacle. The pines are of a prodigious height, straight, thick and of the finest grain, and several have been felled of above 7 feet in diameter at the foot, six at 17 and five at 37 yards, having 147 feet of height in total and 120 to the first branches. The flax brought there from New Zealand bears a good aspect, but no great hopes are rested on its cultivation, and it seems that the second trials of this plant made in London have not achieved the happy outcome of the first.

Norfolk Island was governed by a succession of short-term commandants for the next 11 years, starting with King's replacement, Robert Ross, from 1789 to 1790. When Joseph Foveaux arrived as Lieutenant Governor in 1800, he found the settlement quite run down, little maintenance having been carried out in the previous four years, and he set about building it up, particularly through public works and attempts to improve education.

As early as 1794, Lieutenant-Governor of New South Wales Francis Grose suggested its closure as a penal settlement as it was too remote and difficult for shipping, and too costly to maintain. By 1803, the Secretary of State, Lord Hobart, called for the removal of part of the Norfolk Island military establishment, settlers and convicts to Van Diemen's Land, due to its great expense and the difficulties of communication between Norfolk Island and Sydney. This was achieved more slowly than anticipated, due to reluctance of settlers to uproot themselves from the land they had struggled to tame, and compensation claims for loss of stock. It was also delayed by King's insistence on its value for providing refreshment to the whalers. The first group of 159 left in February 1805 and was mainly composed of convicts and their families and military personnel, with only four groups of settlers departing. Between November 1807 and September 1808, five groups of 554 people departed. Only about 200 remained, forming a small settlement until the remnants were removed in 1813. A small party remained to slaughter stock and destroy all buildings so that there would be no inducement for anyone, especially from another European power, to visit that place.

From 15 February 1814 to 6 June 1825, the island lay abandoned.

=== Lieutenant governors ===
- 6 March 1788 – 24 March 1790: Lieutenant Philip Gidley King (1758–1808)
- 24 March 1790 – November 1791: Major Robert Ross (c.1740–1794)
- 4 November 1791 – October 1796: Lieutenant Philip Gidley King
- October 1796 – November 1799: Captain John Townson (1760–1835)
- November 1799 – July 1800: Captain Thomas Rowley (c.1748–1806)
- 26 June 1800 – 9 September 1804: Major Joseph Foveaux (1765–1846)
- 9 September 1804 – January 1810: Lieutenant John Piper (1773–1851)
- January 1810 – 15 February 1813: Lieutenant Thomas Crane (caretaker)
- 15 February 1813 – 15 February 1814: Superintendent William Hutchinson

== Second penal settlement ==
In 1824 the British government instructed the Governor of New South Wales Thomas Brisbane to occupy Norfolk Island as a place to send "the worst description of convicts". Its remoteness, seen previously as a disadvantage, was now viewed as an asset for the detention of the "twice-convicted" men, who had committed further crimes since arriving in New South Wales. Brisbane assured his masters that "the felon who is sent there is forever excluded from all hope of return" He saw Norfolk Island as "the nec plus ultra of Convict degradation". The detained convicts have long been assumed to be hardcore recidivists, or 'doubly-convicted capital respites' – that is, men transported to Australia who committed fresh colonial crimes for which they were sentenced to death and were spared the gallows on condition of life at Norfolk Island. However, a recent study has demonstrated, utilising a database of 6,458 Norfolk Island convicts, that the reality was somewhat different: more than half were detained at Norfolk Island without ever receiving a colonial conviction, and only 15% had been reprieved from a death sentence. Furthermore, the overwhelming majority of convicts sent to Norfolk Island had committed non-violent property sentences, the average length of detention was three years, and the scale of punishments inflicted upon the prisoners was significantly less than assumed.

His successor, Governor Ralph Darling, was even more severe than Brisbane, wishing that "every man should be worked in irons that the example may deter others from the commission of crime" and "to hold out [Norfolk Island] as a place of the extremest punishment short of death". Governor Arthur, in Van Diemen's Land, likewise believed that "when prisoners are sent to Norfolk Island, they should on no account be permitted to return. Transportation thither should be considered as the ultimate limit and a punishment short only of death". Reformation of the convicts was not seen as an objective of the Norfolk Island penal settlement.

The evidence that has passed down through the years points to the creation of a "Hell in Paradise". A widespread and popular notion of the harshness of penal settlements, including Norfolk Island, has come from the novel For the Term of his Natural Life by Marcus Clarke, which appears to be based on the writings and recollections of witnesses. However, though Clarke did carry out primary research, he selected the most sensational examples possible.

Following a convict mutiny in 1834, Father William Ullathorne, vicar general of Sydney, visited Norfolk Island to comfort the mutineers due for execution. He found it "the most heartrending scene that I ever witnessed". Having the duty of informing the prisoners as to who was reprieved and who was to die, he was shocked to record as "a literal fact that each man who heard his reprieve wept bitterly, and that each man who heard of his condemnation to death went down on his knees with dry eyes, and thanked God."

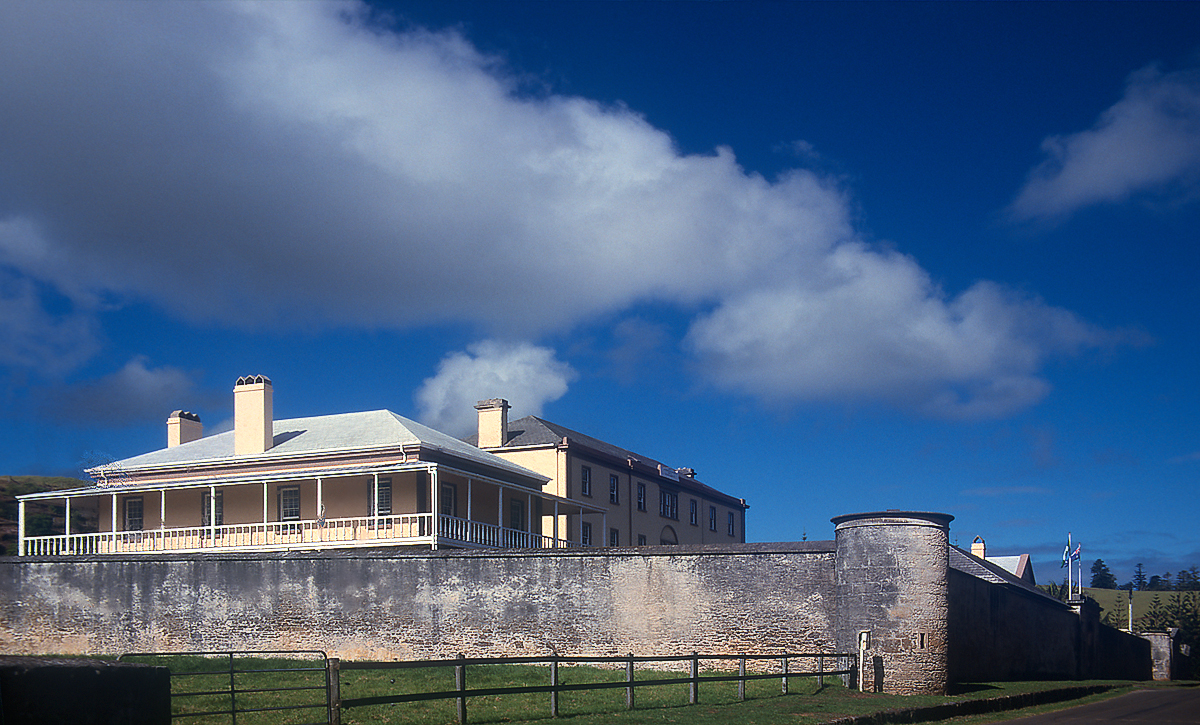

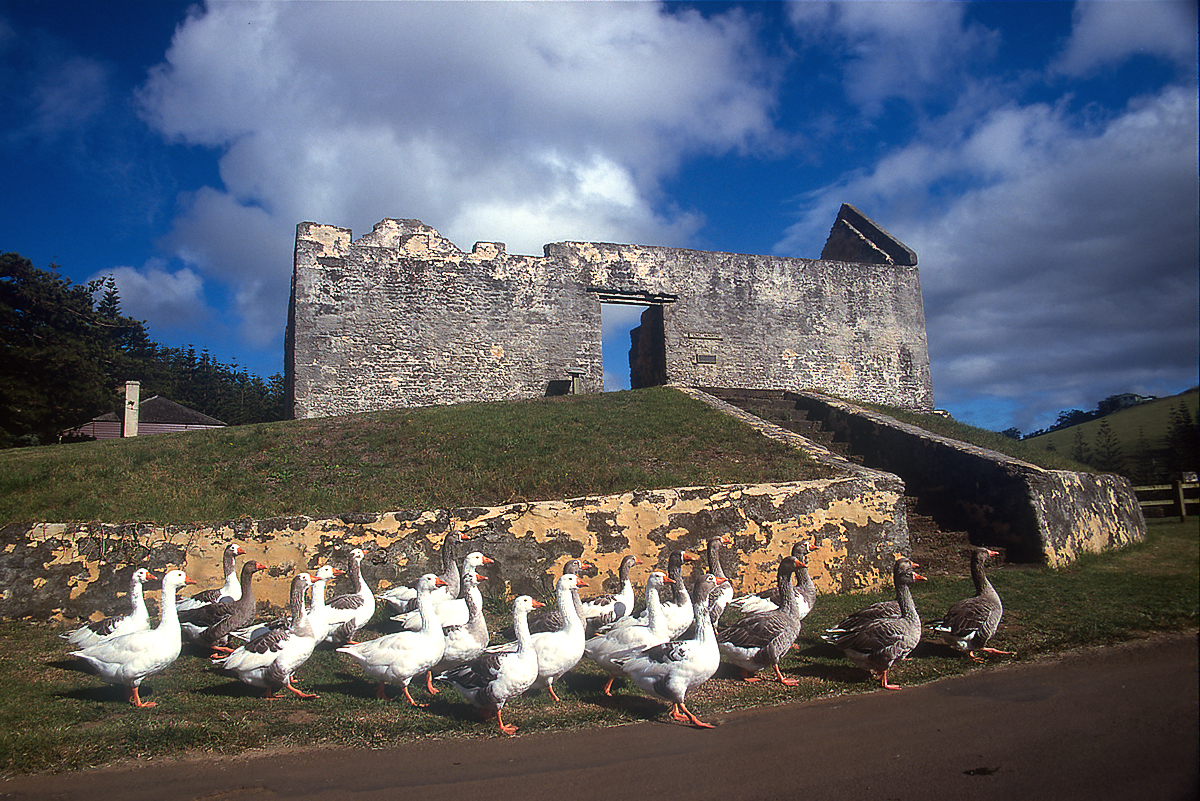

The 1846 report of magistrate Robert Pringle Stuart exposed the scarcity and poor quality of food, inadequacy of housing, horrors of torture and incessant flogging, insubordination of convicts, and corruption of overseers.

Bishop Robert Willson visited Norfolk Island from Van Diemen's Land on three occasions. Following his first visit in 1846, he reported to the House of Lords who, for the first time, came to realise the enormity of atrocities perpetrated under the British flag and attempted to remedy the evils. Willson returned in 1849 and found that many of the reforms had been implemented. However, rumours of resumed atrocities brought him back in 1852, and this visit resulted in a damning report, listing atrocities and blaming the system, which invested one man at this remote place with absolute power over so many people.

Only a handful of convicts left any written record, and their descriptions (as quoted by Hazzard and Hughes) of the living and working conditions, food and housing, and, in particular, the punishments given for seemingly trivial offences, are unremittingly horrifying, describing a settlement devoid of all human decency, under the iron rule of the tyrannical autocratic commandants. However, these conclusions have been reached by a reliance on a series of over-used (mainly published) sources, with them not having been tested or drawn into question by detailed archival research. Such work is currently being done and has, for example, drawn into question the sensationalised version of Norfolk Island's past, such as in demonstrating that the widespread assumption that Norfolk Island convicts engaged in 'murder-suicide pacts' – that is, drawing lots to select a killer and willing victim to 'escape' from Norfolk Island – is a myth.

The actions of some of the commandants, such as Morisset and particularly Price appear to be excessively harsh. All but one were military officers, brought up in a system where discipline was severe throughout the period of transportation. In addition, the commandants relied on a large number of military guards, civil overseers, ex-convict constables, and convict informers to provide them with intelligence and carry out their orders.

Of the commandants, only Alexander Maconochie appeared to reach the conclusion that brutality would breed defiance, as demonstrated by the mutinies of 1826, 1834 and 1846, and he attempted to apply his theories of penal reform, providing incentives as well as punishment. His methods were criticised as being too lenient and he was replaced, a move that returned the settlement to its harsh rule. However, recent research has also demonstrated that the level of punishment under Maconochie's regime was much higher than assumed, as the average number of lashes per flogging – 93 – was higher under Maconochie than any other time during the second penal settlement's history.

The second penal settlement began to be wound down by the British government after 1847 and the last convicts were removed to Tasmania in May 1855. It was abandoned because transportation to Van Diemen's Land had ceased in 1853 and was replaced by penal servitude in the United Kingdom.

=== Commandants ===
- 6 June 1825 – March 1826: Captain Richard Turton
- March 1826 – August 1827: Captain Vance Young Donaldson (1791–?)
- August 1827 – November 1828: Captain Thomas Edward Wright
- November 1828 – February 1829: Captain Robert Hunt
- February 1829 – 29 June 1829: Captain Joseph Wakefield
- 29 June 1829 – 1834: Lieutenant-Colonel James Thomas Morisset (1782–1852)
- 1834: Captain Foster Fyans (1790–1870) (Acting)
- 1834 – April 1839: Major Joseph Anderson (1790–1877)
- April–July 1839: Major Thomas Bunbury (1791–1862)
- July 1839 – March 1840: Major Thomas Ryan (b. c. 1790) (Acting)
- 17 March 1840 – 1844: Captain Alexander Maconochie (1787–1860)
- 8 February 1844 – 5 August 1846: Major Joseph Childs
- 6 August 1846 – 18 January 1853: John Giles Price (1808–1857)
- January 1853 – September 1853: Captain Rupert Deering
- September 1853 – 5 May 1855: Captain H. Day
- 5 May 1855 – 8 June 1856: T.S. Stewart (Caretaker)

== Settlement by Pitcairn Islanders ==
On 8 June 1856, the next settlement began on Norfolk Island. These were the descendants of Tahitians and the HMS Bounty mutineers, resettled from the Pitcairn Islands, which had become too small for their growing population. The British government had permitted the transfer of the Pitcairners to Norfolk, which was thus established as a colony separate from New South Wales but under the administration of that colony's governor. They left Pitcairn Islands on 3 May 1856 and arrived with 194 persons on 8 June.

The Pitcairners occupied many of the buildings remaining from the penal settlements, and gradually established their traditional farming and whaling industries on the island. Although some families decided to return to Pitcairn in 1858 and 1863, the island's population continued to slowly grow as the island accepted settlers, often arriving with whaling fleets.

In 1867, the headquarters of the Melanesian Mission of the Church of England were established on the island, and in 1882 the church of St. Barnabas was erected to the memory of the mission's head Bishop John Coleridge Patteson, with windows designed by Edward Burne-Jones and executed by William Morris. In 1920 the mission was relocated from the island to the Solomon Islands to be closer to its target population.

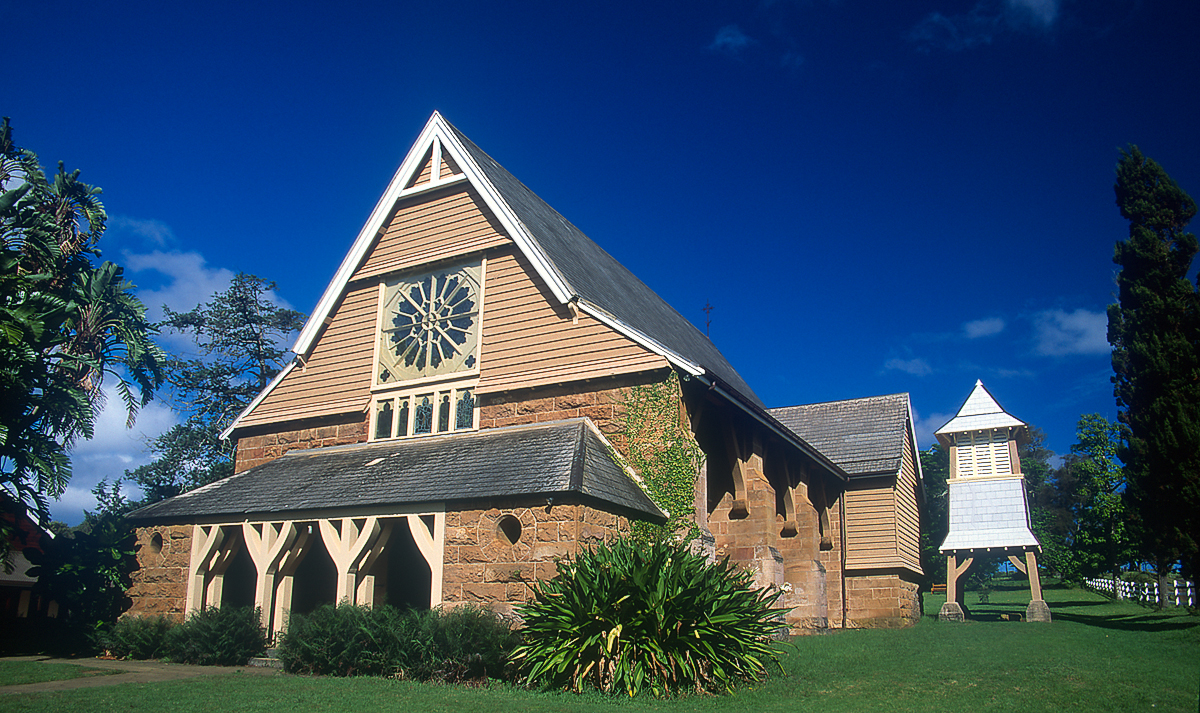
Anglican Church of St. Barnabas, Norfolk Island

== Twentieth century ==
After the creation of the Commonwealth of Australia in 1901, Norfolk Island was placed under the authority of the new Commonwealth government to be administered as an external territory.

During World War II, the island became a key airbase and refueling depot between Australia and New Zealand, and New Zealand and the Solomon Islands. Because Norfolk Island fell within New Zealand's area of responsibility, it was garrisoned by a New Zealand Army unit known as N Force at a large army camp which had the capacity to house a 1,500 strong force. N Force relieved a company of the Second Australian Imperial Force. The island proved too remote to come under attack during the war and N Force left the island in February 1944.

In the late 1960s a mini-invasion by British ex-pats followed after the island was featured on a BBC television documentary presented by Alan Whicker. Fifty families decided to emigrate from the United Kingdom to Norfolk Island as a result of the programme.

In 1979, Norfolk was granted limited self-government by Australia, under which the island elects a government that runs most of the island's affairs. As such, residents of Norfolk Island are not represented in the Commonwealth Parliament of Australia, making them the only group of residents of an Australian state or territory not represented there.

In 2006, a formal review process took place, in which the Australian government considered revising this model of government. The review was completed on 20 December 2006, when it was decided that there would be no changes in the governance of Norfolk Island.

Financial problems and a reduction in tourism led to Norfolk Island's administration appealing to the Australian federal government for assistance in 2010. In return, the islanders were to pay income tax for the first time but would be eligible for greater welfare benefits. However, by May 2013, the agreement had not been reached, and the islanders had to leave to find work and welfare. An agreement was finally signed in Canberra on 12 March 2015 to replace self-government with a local council, against the wishes of the Norfolk Island government. A majority of Norfolk Islanders objected to the Australian plan to make changes to Norfolk Island without first consulting them and allowing their say, with 68% of voters being against forced changes. An example of growing friction between Norfolk Island and increased Australian rule was featured in a 2019 episode of Discovery Channel's annual Shark Week. The episode featured Norfolk Island's policy of culling growing cattle populations by killing older cattle and feeding the carcasses to tiger sharks well off the coast. This is done to help prevent tiger sharks from coming further toward shore in search of food. Norfolk Island holds one of the largest populations of tiger sharks in the world. Australia has banned the culling policy as cruelty to animals. Norfolk Islanders fear this will lead to increased shark attacks and damage an already waning tourist industry.

On 4 October 2015, the time zone for Norfolk Island was changed from UTC+11:30 to UTC+11:00.

=== Reduced autonomy 2016 ===
In March 2015, the Australian Government announced comprehensive reforms for Norfolk Island. The action was justified on the grounds it was necessary "to address issues of sustainability which have arisen from the model of self-government requiring Norfolk Island to deliver local, state and federal functions since 1979". On 17 June 2015, the Norfolk Island Legislative Assembly was abolished, with the territory becoming run by an Administrator and an advisory council. Elections for a new Regional Council were held on 28 May 2016, with the new council taking office on 1 July 2016.

From that date, most Australian Commonwealth laws were extended to Norfolk Island. This means that taxation, social security, immigration, customs and health arrangements apply on the same basis as in mainland Australia. Travel between Norfolk Island and mainland Australia became domestic travel on 1 July 2016. For the 2016 Australian federal election, 328 people on Norfolk Island voted in the ACT electorate of Canberra, out of 117,248 total votes. Since 2018, Norfolk Island is covered by the electorate of Bean. There is opposition to the reforms, led by Norfolk Island People for Democracy Inc., an association appealing to the United Nations to include the island on its list of "non-self-governing territories". There has also been movement to join New Zealand since the autonomy reforms.

In October 2019, the Norfolk Island People for Democracy advocacy group conducted a survey on 457 island residents (about one quarter of the entire population) and found that 37% preferred free association with New Zealand, 35% preferred free association with Australia, 25% preferred full independence, and 3% preferred full integration with Australia.
