= List of administrative heads of Norfolk Island =

The administrator of Norfolk Island acts as a representative of the Australian Government and carries out other duties according to the Norfolk Island Amendment Act 2015. Since its construction in 1829, Government House located in Kingston has been the residence of the commandants, chief magistrates, and presently, administrators of Norfolk Island.

== List of officeholders ==
Term	Incumbent	Title	Notes
6 March 1788 to 24 March 1790	Philip Gidley King	Lieutenant-Governor	1st term
24 March 1790 to November 1791	Robert Ross	Lieutenant-Governor	
4 November 1791 to 29 June 1800	Philip Gidley King	Lieutenant-Governor	2nd term
1796 to 1799	John Townson	Lieutenant-Governor	
1799 to 1800	Thomas Rowley	Lieutenant-Governor	
29 June 1800 to September 1804	Joseph Foveaux	Lieutenant-Governor	
9 September 1804 to January 1810	John Piper	Lieutenant-Governor	
January 1810 to February 1814	Tankerville Alexander Crane	Lieutenant-Governor	
February 1814 to 6 June 1825	abandoned		
6 June 1825 to April 1826	Richard Turton	Commandant	
1826 to 1827	Vance Young Donaldson	Commandant	
1827 to 1828	Thomas Edward Wright	Commandant	
1828 to 1829	Robert Hunt	Commandant	
February 1829 to 29 June 1829	Joseph Wakefield	Commandant	
29 June 1829 to 1834	James Morisset	Commandant	
1834 to 1834	Foster Fyans	Commandant	
1834 to 4 November 1839	Joseph Anderson	Commandant	
1839 to 1839	Thomas Bunbury	Commandant	
1840 to 1840	Thomas Ryan	Commandant	
17 March 1840 to 1844	Alexander Maconochie	Commandant	
8 February 1844 to 5 August 1846	Joseph Childs	Commandant	
1846 to 1853	John Giles Price	Commandant	
May 1855 to 8 June 1856	abandoned		
June 1856	Separated from Van Diemen's Land and made a Distinct and Separate Settlement. (Pitcairn Agreement with Her Majesty Queen Victoria). A Governor (Crown) was appointed to administer the Government of Norfolk Island		
1856 to 1857	George Martin Frederick Young	Chief Magistrate	1st term
1858 to 1858	Isaac Christian	Chief Magistrate	
1859 to 1859	George Martin Frederick Young	Chief Magistrate	2nd term
1860 to 1861	Thomas Buffett	Chief Magistrate	
1862 to 1865	Arthur Quintal II	Chief Magistrate	1st term
1866 to 1866	William Quintal	Chief Magistrate	1st term
1867 to 1870	John Buffett	Chief Magistrate	1st term
1871 to 1871	David Buffett	Chief Magistrate	
1872 to 1873	William Quintal	Chief Magistrate	2nd term
1874 to 1875	Fletcher Christian Nobbs	Chief Magistrate	
1876 to 1880	Francis Mason Nobbs	Chief Magistrate	1st term
1881 to 1882	John Buffett	Chief Magistrate	2nd term
1883 to 1884	Francis Mason Nobbs	Chief Magistrate	2nd term
1885 to 1885	Arthur Quintal II	Chief Magistrate	2nd term
1886 to 1887	Stephen Christian	Chief Magistrate	1st term
1888 to 1888	Henry Seymour Buffett	Chief Magistrate	
1889 to 1890	Stephen Christian	Chief Magistrate	2nd term
1891 to 1892	Byron Stanley Mitchell Adams	Chief Magistrate	1st term
1893 to 1893	Stephen Christian	Chief Magistrate	3rd term
1894 to 1894	Francis Mason Nobbs	Chief Magistrate	3rd term
1895 to 1896	Byron Stanley Mitchell Adams	Chief Magistrate	2nd term
1896 to 1898	Warner Wright Spalding	Administrator	
1898 to 1903	Charles McArthur King	Administrator	
1903 to 1907	Walton Drake	Administrator	
1907 to 1913	Charles Sinclair Elliot	Administrator	
Under the Norfolk Island Act 1913
21 August 1913 to 30 August 1920	Michael Vincent Murphy	Administrator	1st term
1 September 1920 to 30 June 1924	John William Parnell	Administrator	
1 July 1924 to 16 October 1926	Edwin Thomas Leane	Administrator	
1926 to 1926	Henry Stephenson Edgar	Administrator	1st term
1926 to 1 February 1927	Michael Vincent Murphy	Administrator	2nd term
1 February 1927 to 25 January 1928	Victor Conradsdorf Morisset Sellheim	Administrator	
25 January 1928 to 6 June 1928	Henry Stephenson Edgar	Administrator	2nd term
6 June 1928 to 21 January 1929	Charles Edward Herbert	Administrator	
1 May 1929 to 30 June 1932	Alfred Joshua Bennett	Administrator	
1 July 1932 to 3 December 1937	Charles Robert Pinney	Administrator	
4 December 1937 to 31 December 1945	Sir Charles Rosenthal	Administrator	
1 January 1946 to 31 December 1952	Alexander Wilson	Administrator	
1 January 1953 to 30 April 1958	Colin Hugh Boyd Norman	Administrator	
1 May 1958 to 1962	Reginald Sylvester Leydin	Administrator	
1962 to 1964	Robert Wordsworth	Administrator	
1964 to 1966	Roger Nott	Administrator	
1966 to June 1968	Reginald Marsh	Administrator	
July 1968 to August 1972	Robert Nixon Dalkin	Administrator	
August 1972 to 31 August 1975	Edward Thomas Pickerd	Administrator	1st term
1 September 1975 to 31 May 1976	Charles Ivens Buffett	Acting Administrator	
1 June 1976 to 4 September 1976	Edward Thomas Pickerd	Acting Administrator	2nd term
4 September 1976 to 4 September 1979	Desmond Vincent O'Leary	Administrator	
Under the Norfolk Island Act 1979
5 September 1979 to 19 March 1981	Peter Coleman	Administrator	
19 March 1981 to 10 May 1981	Ian Hutchison	Acting Administrator	
11 May 1981 to 27 January 1982	Thomas Ferguson Paterson	Acting Administrator	
28 January 1982 to 28 April 1985	Raymond Edward Trebilco	Administrator	
29 April 1985 to 31 December 1988	John Alexander Matthew	Administrator	
31 December 1988 to 12 April 1989	William McFadyen Campbell	Acting Administrator	
13 April 1989 to 12 April 1992	Herbert Bruce MacDonald	Administrator	
13 April 1992 to 30 June 1997	Alan Gardner Kerr	Administrator	
1 July 1997 to 3 August 1997	Ralph Alexander Condon	Acting Administrator	
4 August 1997 to 30 July 2003	Anthony John Messner	Administrator	
30 July 2003 to 1 November 2003	Michael Stephens	Acting Administrator	
1 November 2003 to September 2007	Grant Tambling	Administrator	
1 October 2007 to 2 October 2008	Owen Walsh	Acting Administrator	
2 October 2008 to 1 April 2012	Owen Walsh	Administrator	
1 April 2012 to 30 June 2014	Neil Pope	Administrator	
1 July 2014 to 31 March 2017	Gary Hardgrave	Administrator	
1 April 2017 to 31 May 2023	Eric Hutchinson	Administrator	
1 June 2023 to 31 May 2026	George Plant	Administrator	
1 June 2026 to present	Fiona McKergow	Administrator	

== See also ==
- History of Norfolk Island
- List of heads of government of Norfolk Island
