= History of Albany, Western Australia =

The coastline of the Albany area was observed by Europeans for the first time in 1627 by the Dutchman François Thijssen, captain of the ship 't Gulden Zeepaert (transl. The Golden Seahorse), who sailed to the east as far as Ceduna in South Australia and back. Captain Thijssen had discovered the south coast of Australia and charted about 1,768 kilometres (1,099 mi) of it between Cape Leeuwin and the Nuyts Archipelago.

On 29 September 1791, explorer Captain George Vancouver while exploring the south coast on HMS Discovery, entered and named King George the Third's Sound and Princess Royal Harbour, and took possession of New Holland for the British Crown. Vancouver went out of his way to establish good relationships with the local Aboriginal people.

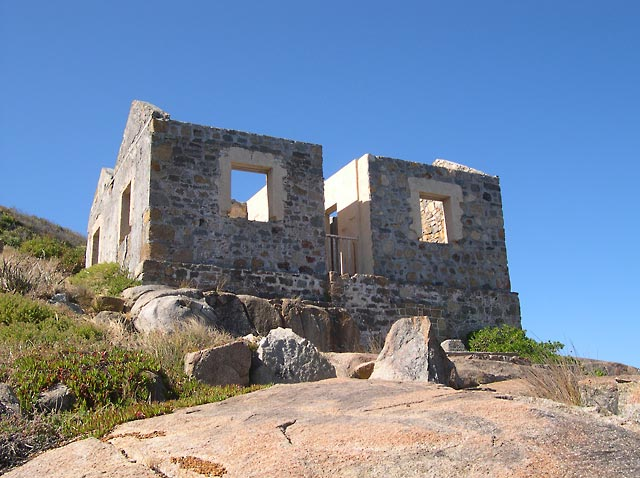
Old Forts Lighthouse. King Point, Albany.

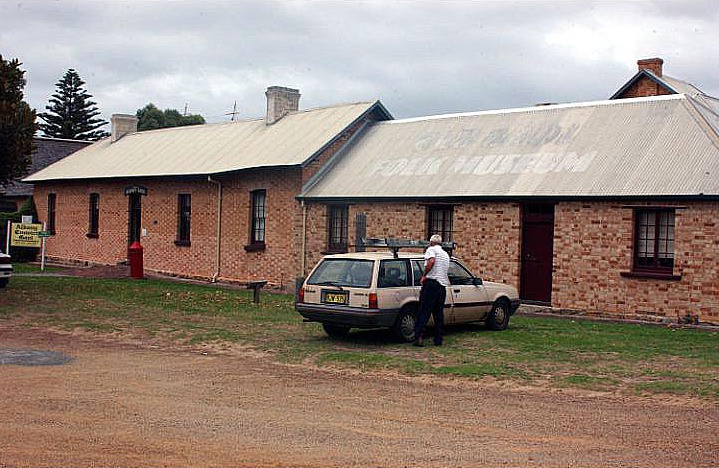
Convict gaol, dating to 1852

In 1792, Frenchman Bruni d'Entrecasteaux, in charge of Recherche and Espérance, reached Cape Leeuwin on 5 December and explored eastward along the southern coast. The expedition did not enter King George Sound due to bad weather.

In 1801, Matthew Flinders entered King George Sound and stayed for about a month before charting the rest of the southern Australian coastline. By 9 June 1803 he had completed the first circumnavigation of Australia.

French explorer Nicolas Baudin visited King George Sound from 18 February – 1 March 1803, in Géographe and Casuarina. He surveyed Princess Royal Harbour, Oyster Harbour and the coast as far as Bald Island, to the east. During this visit, Casuarina was beached in Princess Royal Harbour for repairs.

Australian-born explorer Phillip Parker King visited King George Sound in 1822 on Bathurst.

== British settlement ==
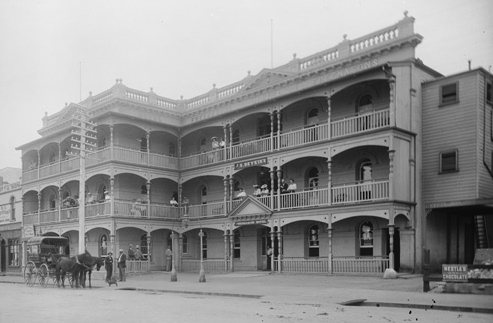
Freemason's Hotel, Albany c. 1905

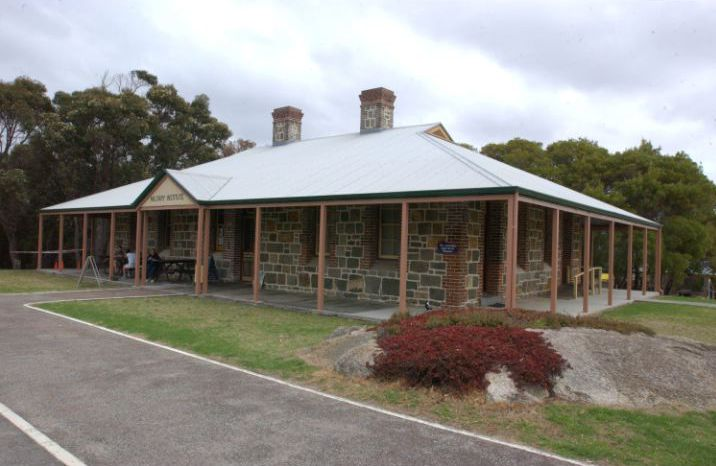
Light Horse memorial building at Princess Royal Fortress

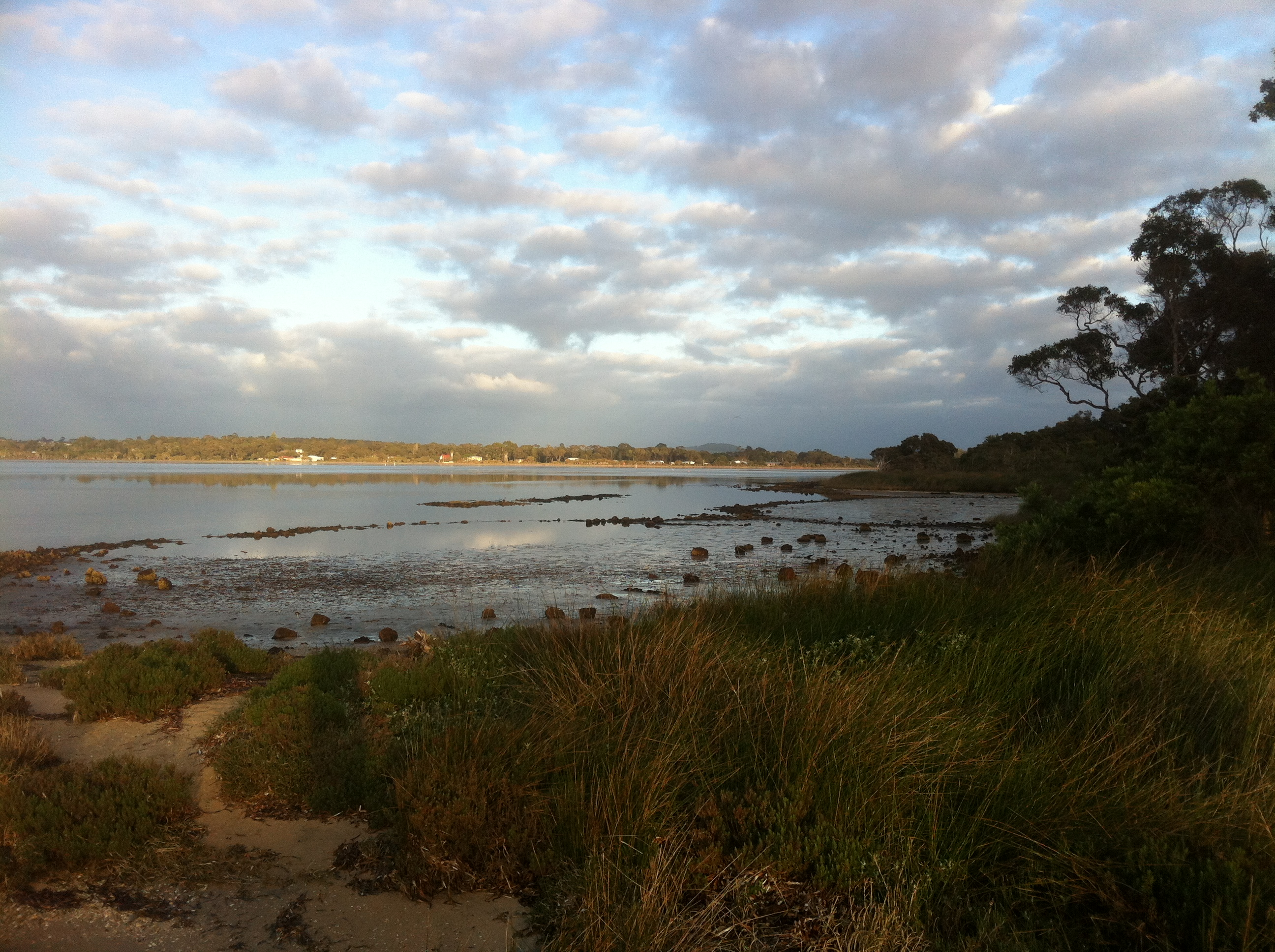
Northern end of Albany Fish Traps

In a letter dated 11 March 1826, Henry Bathurst, Secretary of State for War and the Colonies, instructed Governor of New South Wales Ralph Darling that if found suitable a settlement should be established at King George's Sound as it was located on the shipping route between Britain and Port Jackson.

Major Edmund Lockyer was placed in command of the expedition by Governor Darling on 4 November 1826, and given instructions in case of an encounter with the French, that Lockyer was to land troops to signify to the French that "the whole of New Holland is subject to His Britannic Majesty's Government, and that orders have been given for the Establishment at King George's Sound of a Settlement for the reception of Criminals accordingly".

On 26 October 1826, Frenchman Dumont d'Urville in Astrolabe had visited King George Sound before sailing along the south coast to Port Jackson.

Lockyer and his expedition left Sydney on 9 November 1826 aboard HM brig Amity, with a detachment of twenty troops from the 39th Regiment, twenty-three convicts to assist in establishing the settlement, and six months provisions.

Arriving at King George's Sound on 25 December 1826, Lockyer landed ashore early the next day and commenced a survey of the area. On 30 December the troops and prisoners were disembarked, setting up camp and landing stores. On 21 January 1827, as instructed by the Colonial Secretary, the Union Jack was raised and a feu de joie fired by the troops, formally annexing the territory, in assertion of the first official claim by the Imperial Government to British possession over the whole continent of Australia. This was the first site of European settlement in Western Australia.

Lockyer rescued Aboriginal women from offshore islands, who had been kidnapped by sealers operating in the Great Australian Bight as sexual slaves, and apprehended the culprits, sending them east to stand trial. As a result, the local Minang Noongar organised a corroboree in his honour, cementing the good relationships established earlier between local Aboriginal groups of the area and European explorers.

Lockyer left for Sydney on 3 April 1827, handing over command to Captain Joseph Wakefield. King George's Sound continued as a penal settlement for several years. Lieutenant George Sleeman took over as Commandant on 6 December 1828, followed by Captain Collett Barker on 3 December 1829.

To the north, at the Swan River, a new colony, envisaged from the outset as a free settlement, was established on 17 June 1829. The settlers of Swan River objected to the presence of convicts within the colony, and its commander James Stirling was unhappy having a military outpost within Western Australia under the command of the Governor of New South Wales. Given the inconvenience and expense of maintaining King George's Sound from Sydney, Governor Darling took the political opportunity and on 7 March 1831 the settlement was made part of the Swan River Colony and the convicts and military garrison were withdrawn to New South Wales.

Albany was officially named by Lieutenant-Governor Stirling from 1 January 1832, after The Duke of York and Albany, second son of King George III.

The settlement had a population of 180 in 1837. There were 45 houses scattered around Princess Royal Harbour extending around Mount Clarence to the Old Farm.

In 1841 Albany was the final destination of explorer Edward John Eyre, the first European to reach Western Australia overland from the eastern colonies.

The construction of St John's Anglican Church commenced in 1841 and was completed in 1844. The church was the first to be consecrated in Western Australia; the ceremony was conducted on 25 October 1848 by Bishop Augustus Short of Adelaide.

The Albany Convict Gaol was established in 1852 for imperial convicts transported to Albany as skilled labourers.

Mail from Europe was often delivered to Albany, which had Western Australia's only deep water port, and delivered by road to Perth. However the journey was arduous so a lot of work was put into building bridges and improving the roads. In the 1850s a more reliable mail route began running between Perth and Albany was opened up, and could be traversed in 3–4 days, although it would often take longer. By the 1870s roadside inns were serving travellers, with Chockerup Inn being the closest to Albany, about two hours drive by horse and coach. The opening of the Great Southern Railway in 1889 opened up traffic even more, though it also led to the demise of small places along the former mail roads.

The first mayor of the town was William Finlay, elected in 1885.

The Albany Advertiser was first published in 1888 as the Australian Advertiser. The paper is still in circulation and is the oldest continuous-running non-metropolitan newspaper in Western Australia.

During the 19th century the loss of the port was deemed a potential threat to the state and the nation. The Princess Royal Fortress was built from funds contributed by all states and guns provided by the Imperial British Government. The fortress was the first federal defence project in Australia, without the country yet having a federal government, and opened in 1893.

Building of the Albany Courthouse commenced in 1896 and it was completed in 1898. The Courthouse was opened the acting Premier, Edward Wittenoom. Although it has been renovated internally the exterior is mostly unchanged.

Until the opening of the Fremantle Inner Harbour in 1897, Albany was also home to the only deep-water port in Western Australia, Princess Royal Harbour. This is the largest natural harbour in Western Australia and also on the entire south coast of the Australian mainland, outside of Melbourne. This facility meant that, for many years, the first port of call for the mail from England was at Albany. This put Albany in a privileged position over Perth and it remained that way until engineer C. Y. O'Connor removed the bar that was blocking the entrance into the Swan River, constructing the Fremantle Inner Harbour, thus establishing this port as Western Australia's major harbour.

The population of the town increased from 4,500 in 1945 to 4,960 in 1949. By 1954 the population was 8,265 and by 1961 it increased to 10,526, mostly due to the arrival of European migrants.

Since that time, Albany has become popular with the retired population, with many inhabitants enjoying the place for its fresh air, local beaches, and fine views over the Southern Ocean.

The Albany hospital was redeveloped as part of the Royalties for Regions initiative was opened in 2013. Renamed the Albany Health Campus the project cost A$170 million, equivalent to A$209.1 million in 2022, and is the largest regional hospital project in the state's history.

The Albany Entertainment Centre was opened in 2010 as part of waterfront redevelopments on lands adjacent to Albany Port. The National Anzac Centre was opened in 2014 in preparation for Anzac Centenary. The centre is situated within the Princess Royal Fortress Military Museum Precinct near Mount Clarence.

== World War I ==
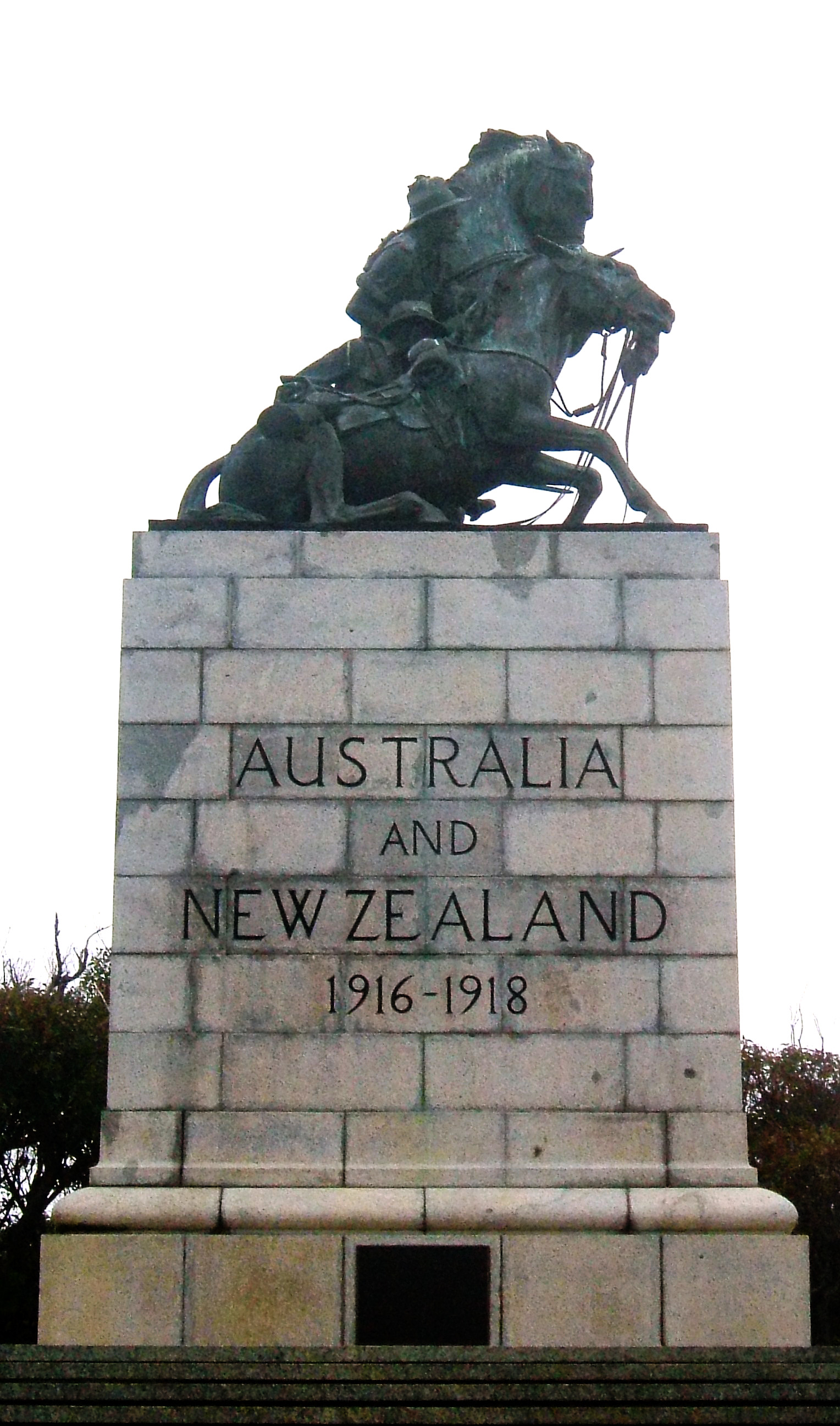
The Desert Mounted Corps Memorial on Mount Clarence

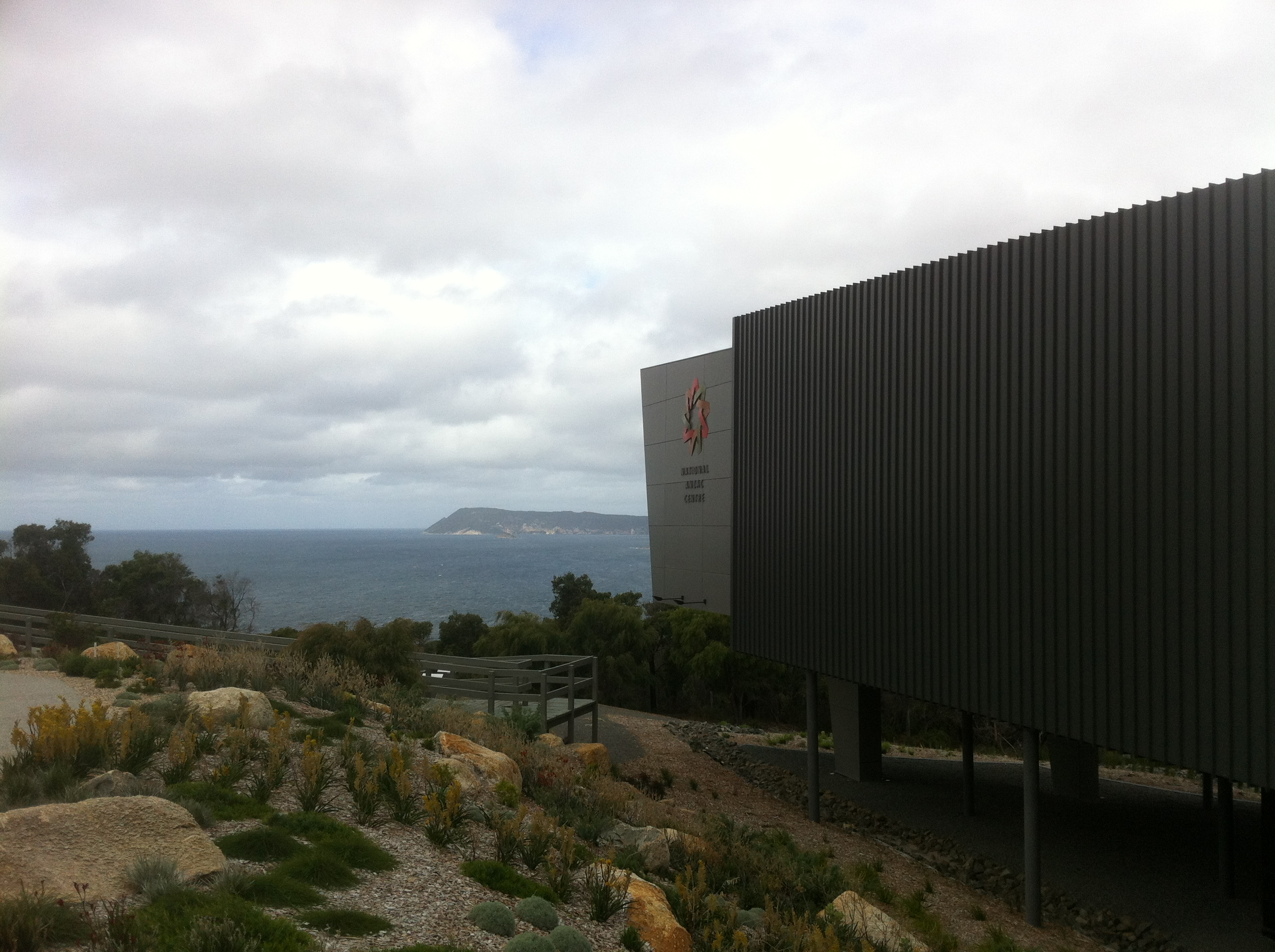
National Anzac Centre

Ships carrying the Australian Imperial Force and the New Zealand Expeditionary Force (later known collectively as ANZACs) to Egypt to join World War I gathered at Albany in late October 1914. The first detachment departed in convoy on 1 November 1914, with a second detachment departing in late December 1914. Albany was the last place in Australia that these ANZACs saw. The Albany Anzac Peace Park and the Pier of Remembrance were dedicated in 2010, as a precursor to centenary commemorations planned for 2014–2018.

The First Australian and New Zealand Expeditionary Force Fleet (1st Detachment) comprised the escort vessels HMS Minotaur of the Royal Navy's China Station, Japanese battlecruiser Ibuki, the Australian cruisers Melbourne and Sydney, and the Royal New Zealand Squadron warships Pyramus, Psyche, and Philomel. These warships protected a 38-strong convoy, consisting of the Australian troopships Hymettus, Geelong, Orvieto (which was fleet command vessel), Pera, Omrah, Clan Maccorquordale, Medic, Argyllshire, Shropshire, Karoo, Ascanius, Saldanha, Katuna, Euripides, Star of England, Star of Victoria, Port Lincoln, Wiltshire, Afric, Hororata, Morene, Rangatira, Suffolk, Benalla, Anglo-Egyptian, Armadale, Southern, and Militiades, plus the New Zealand transports Maunganui, Tahiti, Ruapehu, Orari, Limerick, Star of India, Hawke's Bay, Arawa, Athenic, and Waimana.

The Desert Mounted Corps Memorial on top of Mount Clarence is in memory of the dead of the Australian Light Horse Brigade, the New Zealand Mounted Rifles Brigade, the Imperial Camel Corps and the Australian Flying Corps from 1916 to 1918. The memorial consists of a statue of an Australian mounted soldier assisting a New Zealand soldier whose horse has been wounded, and a wall listing the groups commemorated. The first recorded Dawn Service was conducted by Anglican chaplain Arthur Earnest White (44th Battalion AIF) on 25 April 1923 atop Mount Clarence, and has been held ever since with several thousand people participating each year. Atop the adjoining Mount Adelaide is the Princess Royal Fortress - gun emplacements, buildings and a collection of military memorabilia to honour the sacrifice of Australian Defence Force personnel spanning the Boer War to today. The contribution of Mustafa Kemal Atatürk, president of Turkey from 1923 until 1938, is recognised by naming the entrance into Princess Royal Harbour as Atatürk Entrance, and there is a statue / monument overlooking the entrance on the Marine Drive walking trail.

In 2014 the centenary of the troops leaving Albany was commemorated. Approximately 40,000 people, including the Australian Prime Minister Tony Abbott and New Zealand Prime Minister John Key, marked the occasion by attending ceremonies around the town. The event injected about A$30 million into the local economy, equivalent to A$36 million in 2022.

== See also ==
- History of Western Australia

== Sources ==
- Bartlett, W. M. (1976). Western Australian Year Book (PDF). Perth: Australian Bureau of Statistics. ISSN 0083-8772. LCCN 86641587. OCLC 8261989. Wikidata Q126683302. Archived (PDF) from the original on 17 June 2024.
- Garden, Donald S. (1977). Albany. Nelson. ISBN 0-17-005167-6.
