= 2020 in Norfolk Island =

- Decades: 2000s; 2010s; 2020s
- See also: Other events of 2020; Timeline of Norfolk Islander history

Events from 2020 in Norfolk Island.

== Incumbents ==
- Administrator: Eric Hutchinson

== Events ==
Ongoing – COVID-19 pandemic in Oceania

- 3 April – Even though the island had no cases, the government imposed a 32-day travel ban and declared a state of emergency. Administrator Eric Hutchinson stated that the measures were necessary due to the remote island's extremely limited health capacity.
- 6 May – Lockdown measures began to be lifted.
