= Isaac Scott Nind =

Colonial doctor (1797–1868)

Isaac Scott Nind (1797–1868) was an early colonial medical doctor, artist and pharmacist. He qualified LAC (Licentiate of the Apothecaries Company) in London on 13 July 1820. He arrived in New South Wales in 1826. Within three weeks of his arrival he was appointed an Assistant Colonial Surgeon and sailed with the 39th (Dorsetshire) Regiment of Foot under Major Edmund Lockyer on the Amity to establish a convict-supported military garrison at King George Sound on Australia's south-west coast.

While there he compiled a Nyoongar vocabulary.

Suffering from depression, he returned to Sydney in 1829, and then to London. He returned to New South Wales in February 1833 and settled in Paterson, where he practiced as a surgeon. He was appointed a Commissioner of Crown Lands in 1837.

He married Maria Anne Johnston and had five daughters.
