= H Day =

H Day or H. Day may refer to:

- Dagen H (H Day), the day when traffic in Sweden switched to driving on the right
- H-dagurinn (H Day), the day when traffic in Iceland switched to driving on the right
- H. Day, a penal administrator of a convict settlement on Norfolk Island
- H Day, July 19, a holiday commemorating the day Pittsburgh won a 1911 court case to return the final H to the Name of Pittsburgh.
