= Centenary of Albany, Western Australia =

Celebration of European settlement in Western Australia

In 1927, celebrations were held to commemorate the centenary of the founding of Albany, Western Australia. The 1827 settlement in Albany was the first British settlement in Western Australia, preceding the Swan River Colony by two years.

The Albany community and authorities were in direct conflict with the Western Australian government about the celebration and its proximity to the state centenary of 1929 (commemorating the founding of the state capital Perth), both before the centenary and after.

The Western Mail celebrated with a special issue. Other regional newspapers also acknowledged Albany's founding and difference from the state centenary, not all necessarily complimentarily. Comments well after both centenaries were being made due to the Perth-based 1929 centenary and its proponents as derogatory of the Albany event.

== Events ==
The main events to celebrate were conducted over the week of 21 to 28 January 1927.

On 21 January 1927 normal business came to a standstill for the festivities.

A message of congratulations arrived from King George V, who had twice unexpectedly visited the town...

(it was followed by) a week of sports, dinners, picnics and a regatta

— Garden, Albany, page 316

The local newspaper, the Albany Advertiser, providing substantial editorial promotion of the event.

The Governor of Western Australia started the week with an unveiling of a memorial stone at the Albany Town Hall.

The celebrations included an "Exhibition of Secondary Industries".

== Book ==
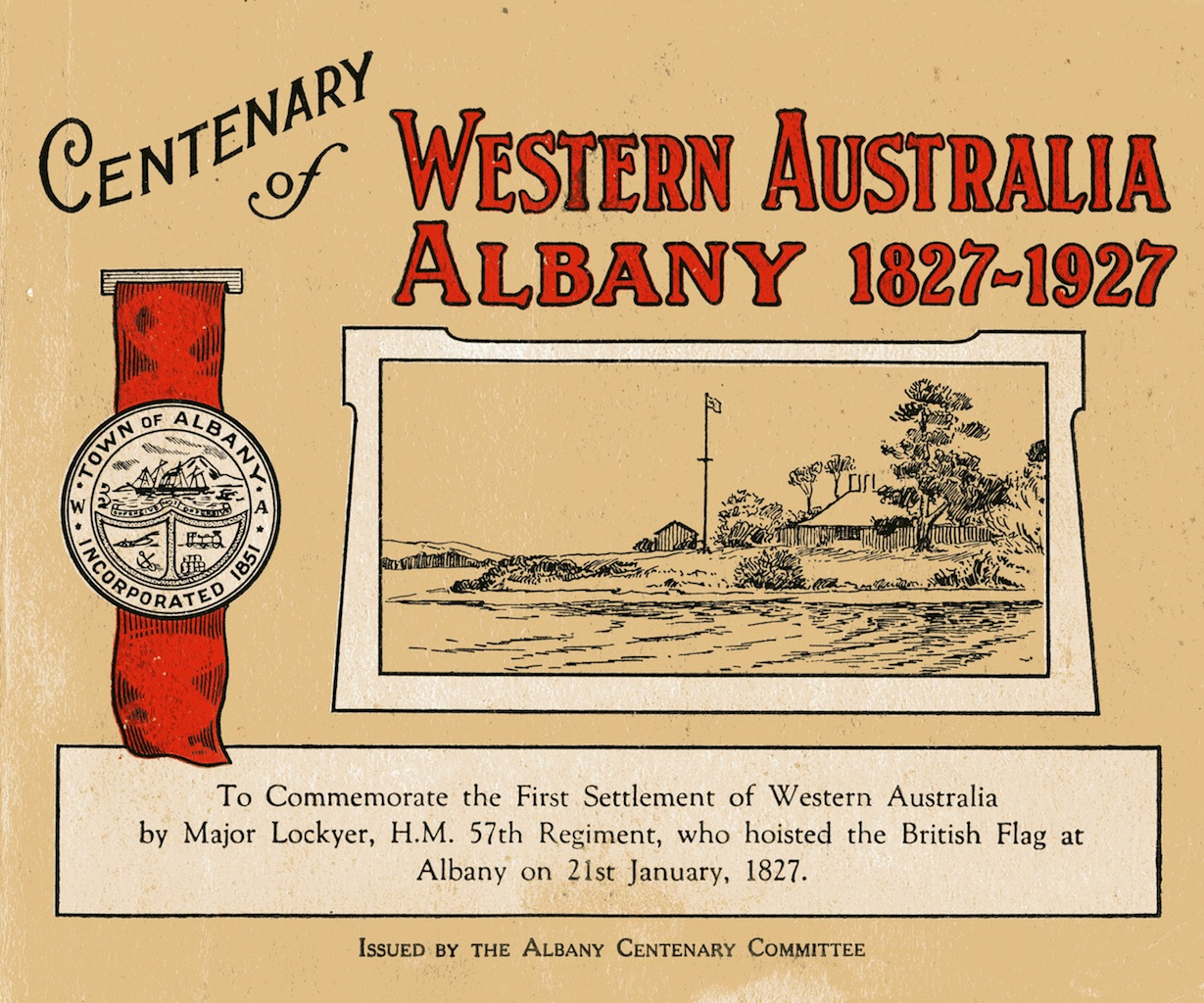
Front page of Centenary of Western Australia Albany 1827–1927

The booklet Centenary of Western Australia Albany 1827–1927 was produced by the Albany Centenary Committee and published by the Albany Advertiser. It provided background to the founding of Albany, including material previously published in the 1910–1913 publication "Alluring Albany".

The booklet subtitle provides the context of the celebration: commemoration of the raising of the British flag by Edmund Lockyer on 21 January 1827 to establish Western Australia's first settlement.
