= Alluring Albany =

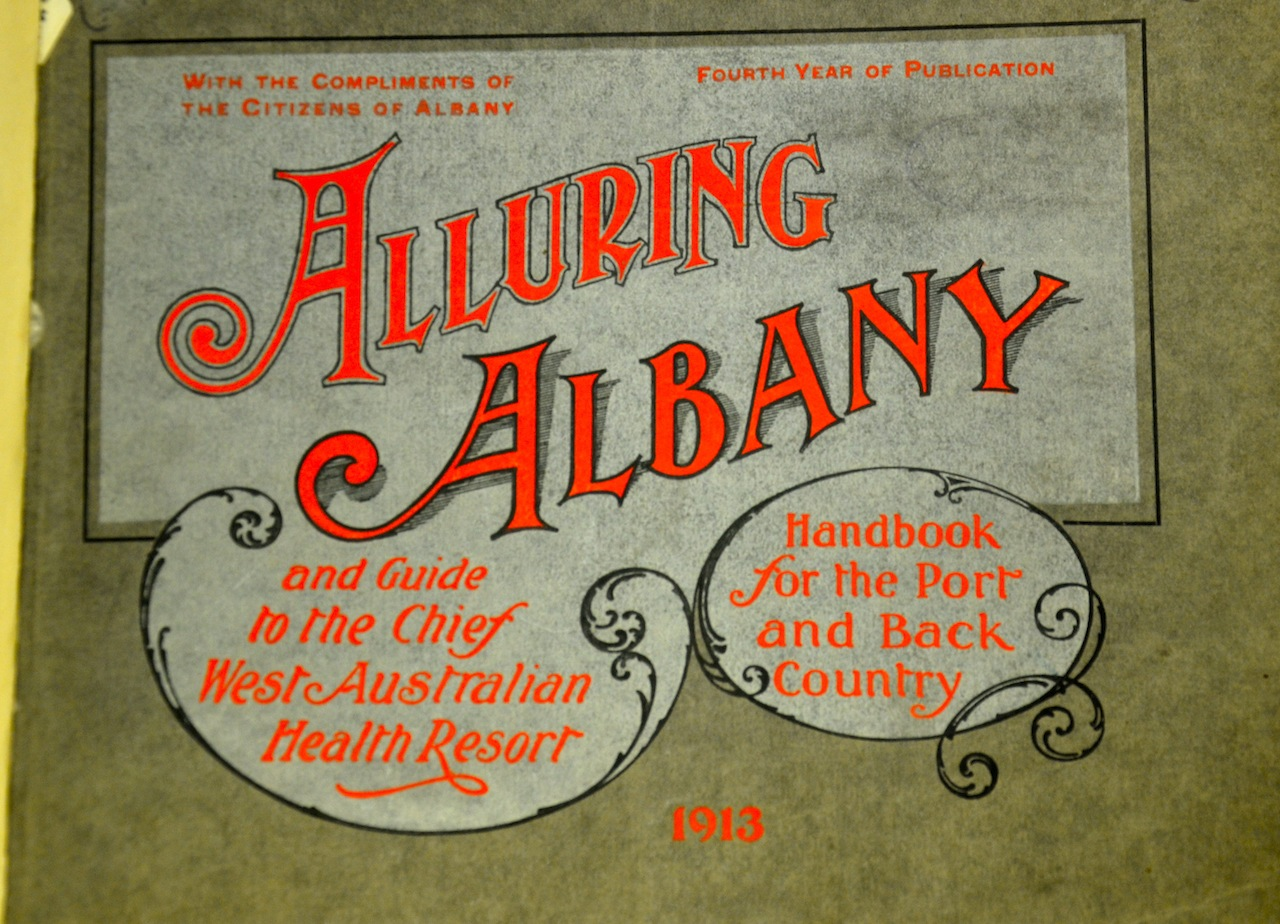
1913 edition cover

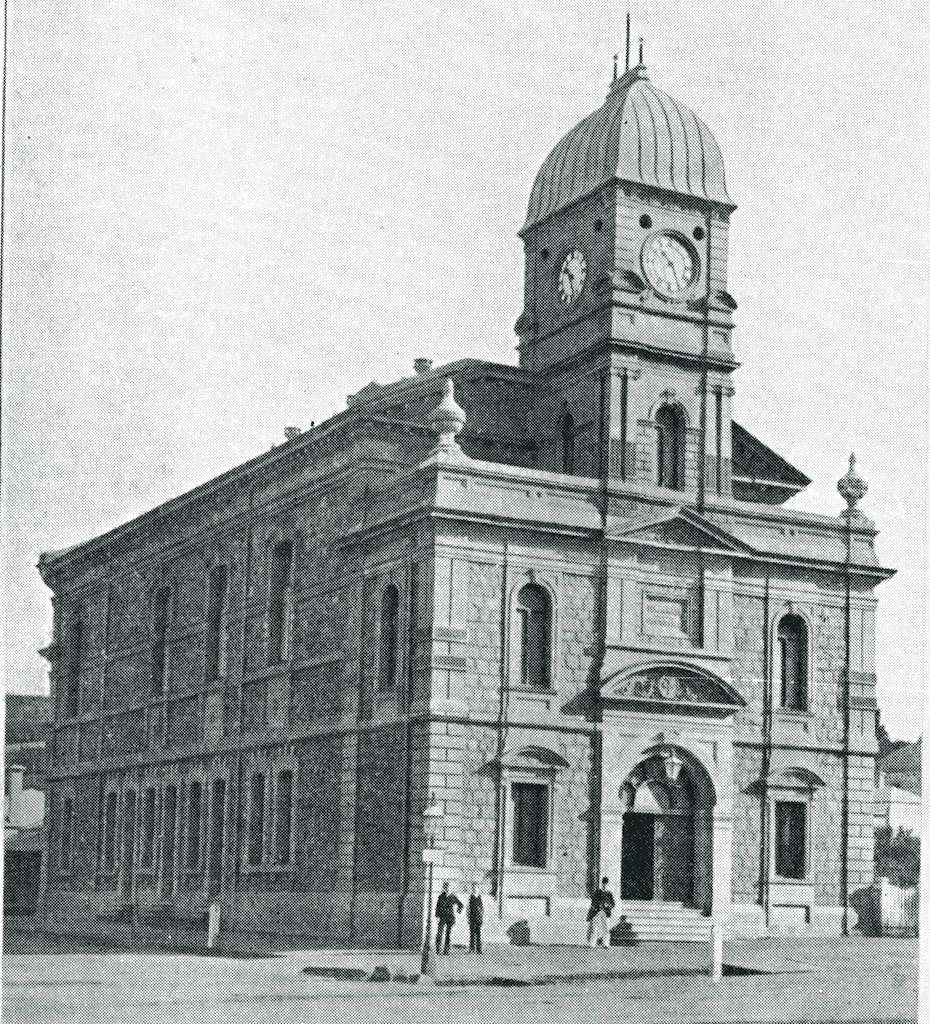
Albany Town Hall in all editions of "Alluring Albany", and the 1927 centenary book

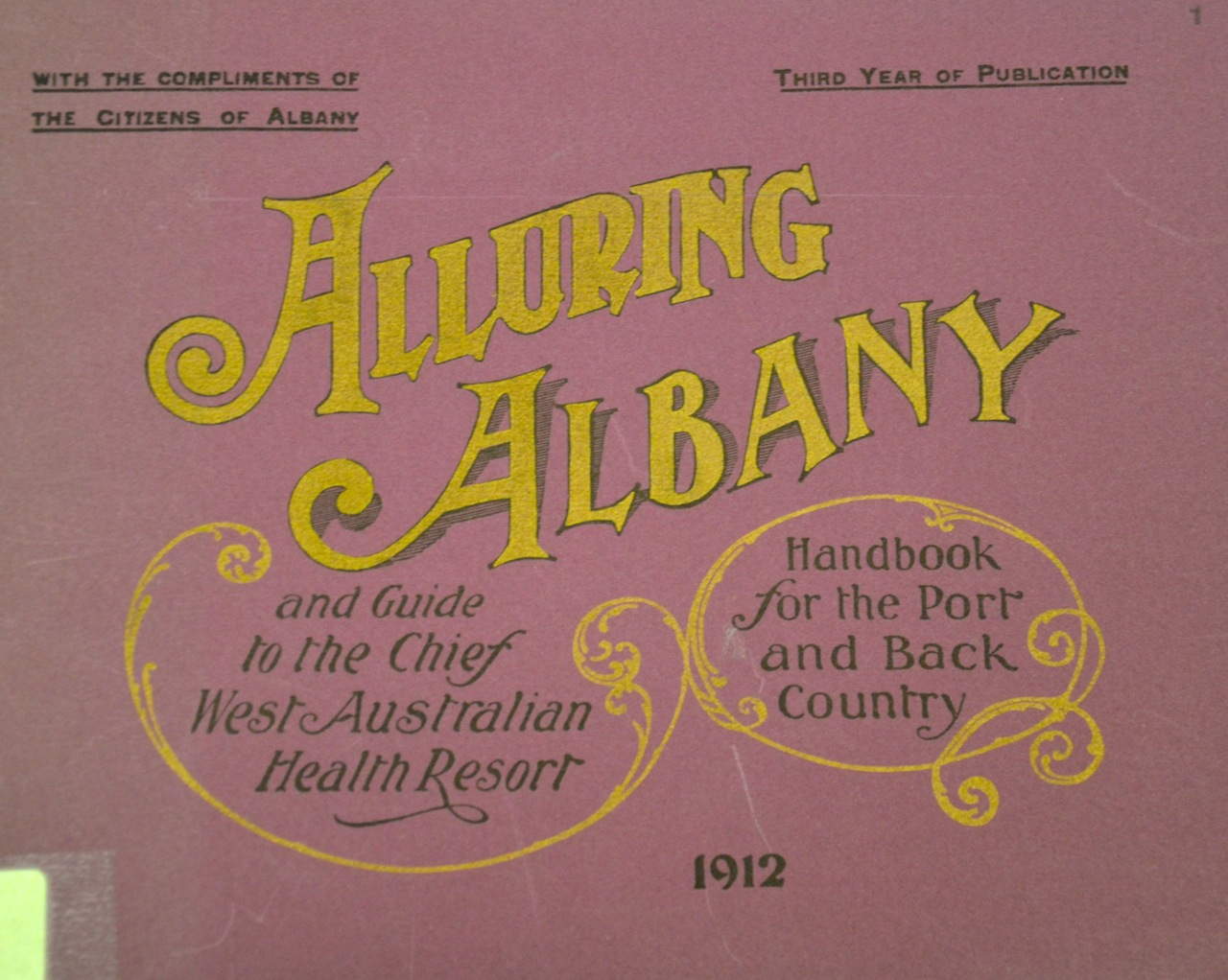
Cover of the 1912 edition

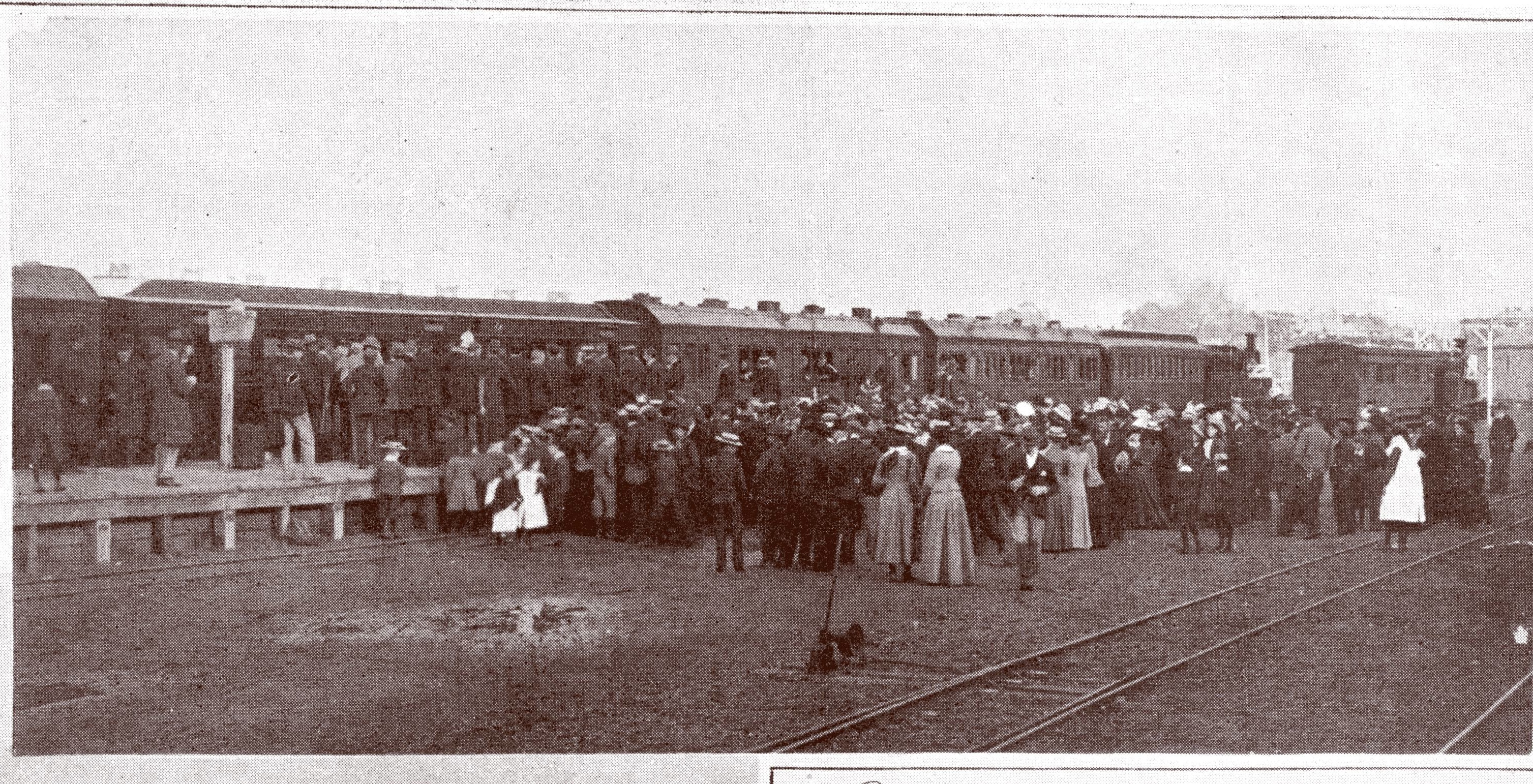
The 1901 royal train at Albany railway station

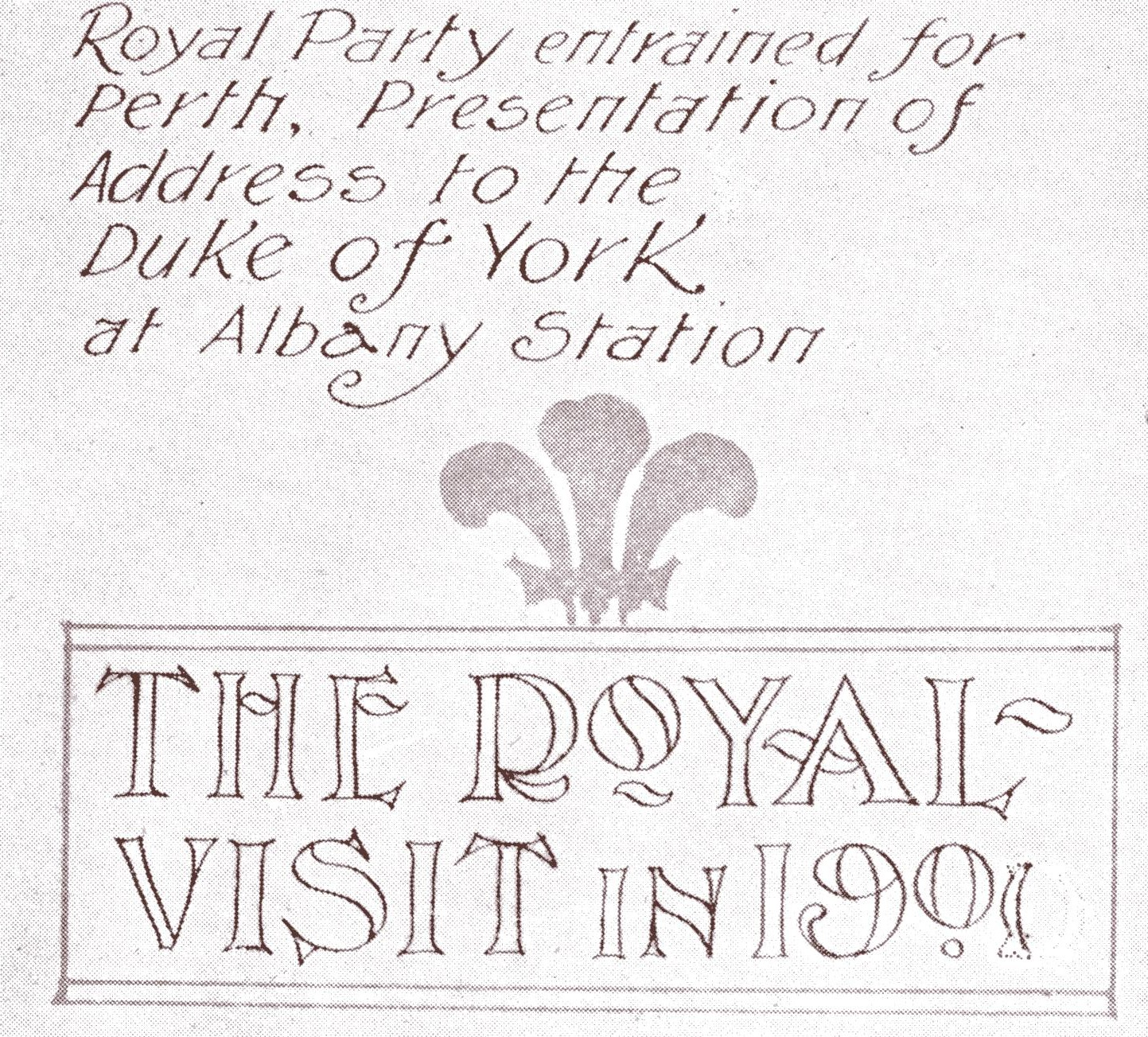
Caption for the royal visit at Albany railway station

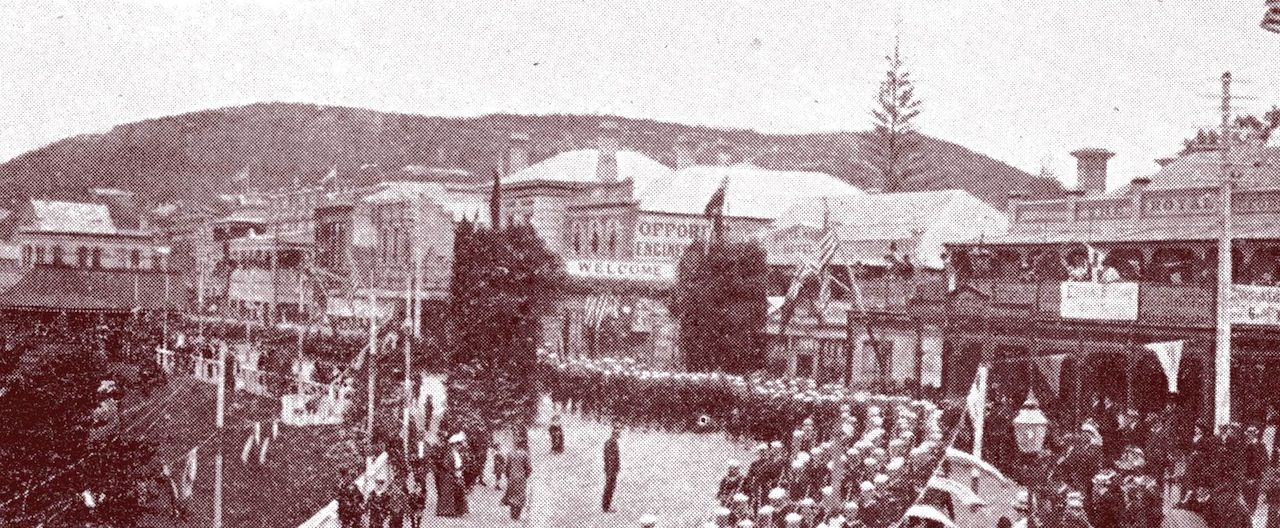
American sailors returning along Stirling Terrace to ships from the American Fleet visiting in 1908

"Alluring Albany" was a book published between 1910 and 1913 (Note: As well as a 1996 facsimile reprint of the 1912 edition. The 1910 edition is available online; the online copy has different pages to the original due to library binding.) by the Albany Advertiser about the town and port of Albany, Western Australia. The printing company, a part of the Advertiser operation, had been founded by William Frear Forster – the founding editor of the Advertiser, who however by the time of publication had moved to work on The Mercury in Hobart, Tasmania.

There were four editions, each edition having differences in content, format and style.

It was circulated throughout Australia and received positive reviews.

It had photographs from the 1901 royal visit, when RMS Ophir brought the Duke and Duchess of Cornwall and York (the future King George V and Queen Mary) to Albany.

There were advertisements for hotels that have survived as heritage properties to today such as the White Star Hotel. The photographs include Stirling Terrace and York Street as well as many of the public buildings of the time.

== 1927 centenary book ==
Material and photographs were utilised in the "Centenary of Western Australia Albany 1827–1927" book, published to commemorate Albany's centenary.

The centenary was two years before that of the state's capital city Perth, which was celebrated in 1929 as the Centenary of Western Australia.
