= Great White Fleet in Albany, Western Australia in 1908 =

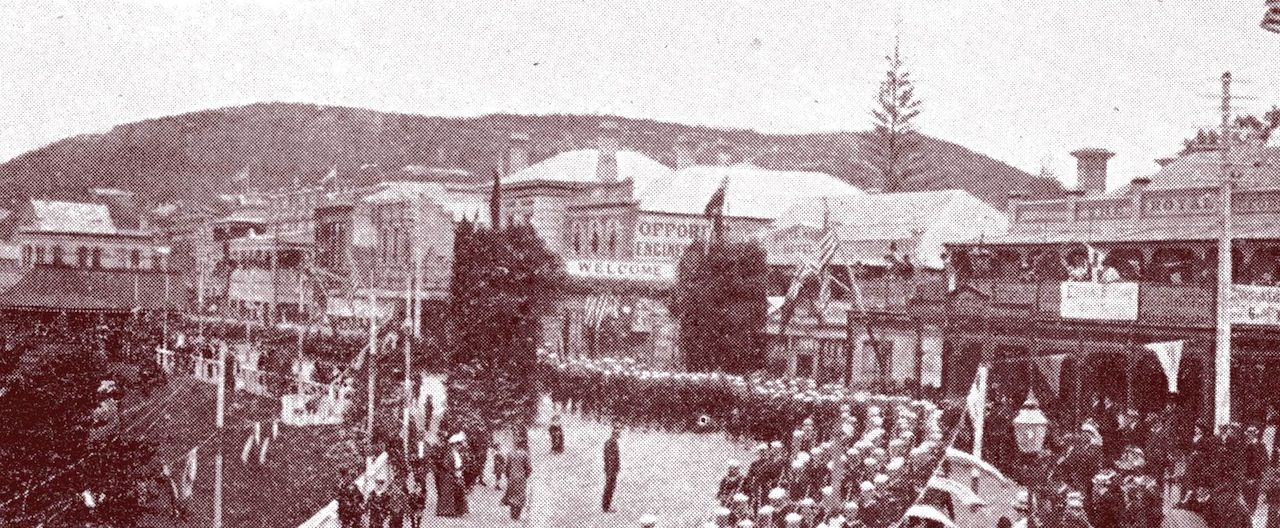
Sailors from the ships on Stirling Terrace from Alluring Albany

The Great White Fleet (also known as the American Fleet) in Albany, Western Australia was the visit of the American naval fleet in late 1908 on its tour around the world.

== Itinerary ==
It was the third and final port of call in Australia (after Sydney and Melbourne) for the 16 battleships participating in the third leg of the voyage, from San Francisco to Manila.

=== Coaling ===
The logistics of this stage of the itinerary required coaling ships. Most intervals between ports were adequate for re-coaling, however the stop in Albany was for travelling to Manila and required full bunkering of coal:

The coaling ships in the contingent were:

Teviotdale: arrived 28 August with 2538 tons
Tottenham: arrived 8 September with 2943 tons
Kildale: arrived 12 September with 2463 tons
Epsom: arrived 16 September with 2970 tons
Taurus: arrived 16 September with 2765 tons

There was a British ship, HMS Gibraltar, in port at the same time as the visit.

== Fleet Week ==
The programme of events was advertised widely as the American Fleet / The visit to Albany, Western Australia. The presence of the ships anchored in Albany's Princess Royal Harbour between 11 and 18 September was known in Albany as Fleet Week.

As well as planned social events, Albany erected decorations in the town. This included a welcoming arch for the visiting Americans as well as decorating the main street, York Street. Events were hampered by rainy weather.

== Centenary ==
On the weekend of 13 to 14 September 2008, Albany held an event to commemorate the centenary anniversary of the 1908 visit, with two Royal Australian Navy ships HMAS Sirius and HMAS Darwin and the American ship USS Shoup visiting the port to celebrate.
