= Richard Turton =

British officer and convict settlement establisher

Major Richard Turton was an officer of the 40th Regiment stationed at Sydney. He was selected to lead the first party of convicts in the re-establishment of the second convict settlement at Norfolk Island. The island had been abandoned since the first convict settlement was finally removed in 1814. The new settlement was intended to be the most severe settlement, where the worst convicts would be sent, without hope of escape and offering, in Governor Darling's view, "the extremest punishment short of death". With 34 soldiers, 57 convicts, and 12 soldiers' wives and children, he landed on 6 June 1825. Most of the convicts were tradesmen to clear the regrowth and prepare buildings. A treadmill was planned, but never sent.

The convicts worked twelve-hour days, and the rations of salt meat and maize-meal sound unappetising, but there are no reports of harsh treatment of this working party.

Thirty-one more convicts arrived in December, along with more wives.

In March 1826, Turton was promoted to major, replaced by Captain Vance Young Donaldson of the 57th Regiment, and returned to Sydney.
