= Thomas Rowley (soldier) =

Norfolk Island administrator

Captain Thomas Rowley (c. 1748 – 27 May 1806) was a soldier and landholder in the convict settlement of New South Wales, Australia.

== Biography ==
He was appointed adjutant of the New South Wales Corps in 1789 and promoted to lieutenant in 1791.

Rowley arrived at Port Jackson in 1792, he had the convict Simeon Lord assigned as servant. He was promoted to captain in 1796 and in 1799 he commenced a tour of duty on Norfolk Island. When Captain John Townson departed prematurely in November, Rowley, as the senior officer, took charge of the settlement. During his rule he ordered liquor stills to be demolished to reduce the drunkenness on the island, and this move brought threats of prosecution from the owners. He was relieved by Major Joseph Foveaux in July 1800 and returned to Sydney. He claimed that his rule was sufficiently creditable to earn the respect of the settlers and Governor King.

In 1802 he resigned his commission and became a farmer. He had received his first land grant in 1793, and accumulated land at a steady rate at Bankstown, Petersham and Burwood. By 1805 he owned 519 sheep, but made no effort to breed from them. He was interested only in meat production, not wool growing.

In 1802 Rowley was given responsibility for the management of the civil and military barracks and became captain of the Sydney company of the Loyal Association, of which he became commandant in 1804. In the same month he became a magistrate.

He died of consumption on 27 May 1806, leaving his property to his children and to his partner Elizabeth Selwyn, a former convict who had arrived on the Pitt in 1792.

== Family ==
He had five children, four with Elizabeth Selwyn. His eldest daughter died in 1808 aged 17.
