= T. S. Stewart =

Norfolk Islands administrator

Thomas Samuel Stewart was the Commissariat Storekeeper at Norfolk Island when it was finally abandoned as a convict settlement. He remained on the island with five of the best behaved convicts to act as caretakers until the new settlers from Pitcairn's Island arrived on 8 June 1856.

They were responsible for sorting the stores to be shipped to Van Diemen's Land (called Tasmania since the granting of responsible government in 1856), and those to be left behind for the new arrivals. Stewart and his wife were there to greet the Pitcairn families when they arrived on the Morayshire.
