= Amity (brig) =

Ship used in Australia in the early nineteenth century

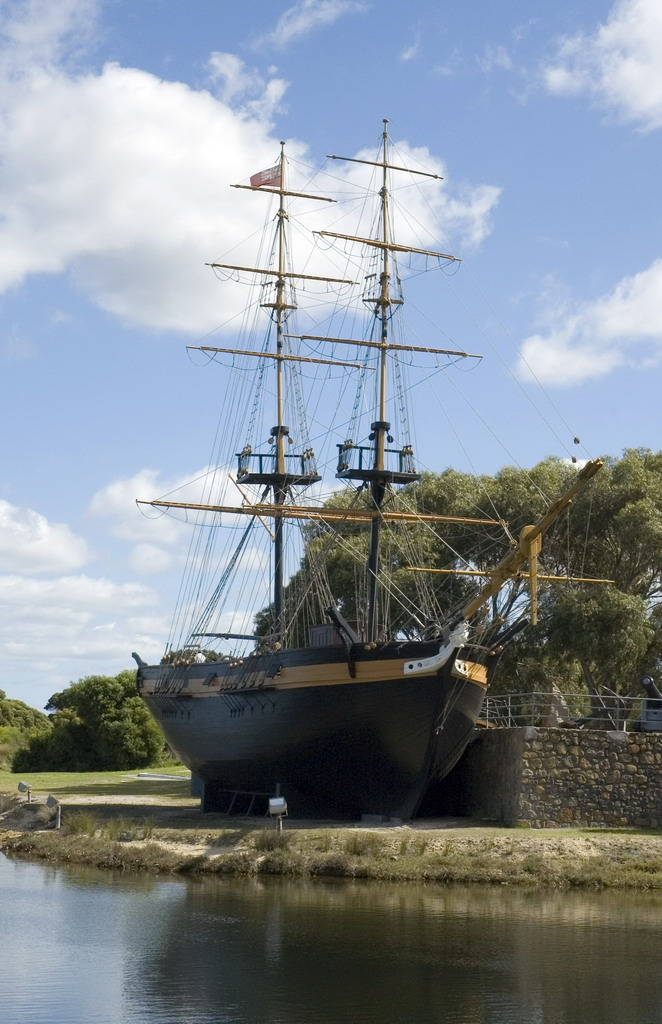
- Amity replica at Albany, Western Australia

History
- Name: Amity
- Builder: St John's, New Brunswick
- Launched: 1816
- Fate: Wrecked near Vansittart Island on 18 June 1845

General characteristics
- Type: Brig
- Tonnage: 148 tons burthen
- Length: 75 feet 6 inches
- Beam: 21 feet 5 inches

Amity was a 148-ton brig used in several notable voyages of exploration and settlement in Australia in the early nineteenth century.

She was built in New Brunswick in 1816 and for some years was used as a merchant vessel trading between America and Britain before being brought to Australia in 1824.

In Australia the vessel engaged in a number of trades, including as a whaler.

== Van Diemen's Land ==
Amity was built as a brig of 148 tons and was launched at Saint John, New Brunswick, in 1816. In 1823 she was purchased by the Scottish Ralston Family to be fitted out for their emigration to Van Diemen's Land. Under the command of Captain McMeckan she departed from Stranraer in southern Scotland on 15 November 1823, travelling via Dublin, across the Atlantic Ocean to Rio de Janeiro and arriving in Hobart exactly five months later on 15 April 1824. Twenty-one passengers made the journey, including Robert Ralston, his wife Elizabeth, two sons and six daughters, as well as cargo and livestock including two bulls and four cows from Scotland.

Ralston later sold the brig to the Government of New South Wales in Sydney where she was used for exploration and supply voyages.

== Moreton Bay ==
The brig carried the first European settlers to Queensland after Redcliffe had been recommended as a suitable location for a penal colony by John Oxley in 1823. Lieutenant Henry Miller led a group of about 70 people including soldiers of the 40th Foot Regiment, 29 convicts, explorers and their families to Moreton Bay on 14 September 1824.

The township of Amity and locality of Amity Point on North Stradbroke Island near Brisbane, Queensland, are named after the ship. The locality includes a Brig Street. There are six streets in Brisbane named Amity and another two on the Sunshine Coast. Amity Park is on the northern outskirts of Brisbane and there is an Amity Recreation Reserve and Amity Point Reserve in the area. In September 1991 a memorial was unveiled at Redcliffe that features four bronze plaques, one of which depicts the vessel itself.

== King George Sound ==
Under instructions from Governor Darling the brig sailed to Western Australia in 1826 under the command of Major Edmund Lockyer, who established the first European settlement there with a military garrison at King George Sound, now Albany. The settlement was initially called Frederick Town. The expedition included Major Lockyer, two military officers, 18 rank and file soldiers, 23 convicts and surgeon Isaac Scott Nind, as well as livestock and supplies for an expected stay of six months.

The group disembarked on Boxing Day, 1826.

== Swan River Colony ==
On 22 September 1829 Amity arrived at Fremantle from Singapore with passengers and crew totalling 15 people. She was the eighth shipping arrival in the fledgling Swan River Colony.

== Whaling ==
The vessel was put to work in the whaling trade in Tasmania. Based in Hobart, she made twelve such voyages in the years between 1832 and 1841.

== Wrecked ==
By 1844 the vessel was involved in the transport of cattle from Port Albert in Victoria across Bass Strait to Hobart in Tasmania. Amity was wrecked after running aground on an uncharted sandbar now called Vansittart Shoals (40°16′S 148°25′E) near Vansittart Island, north of Van Diemen's Land (later Tasmania) on 18 June 1845.

Captain William Marr was sailing Amity from Hobart for Port Albert in ballast on 14 June 1845, with a crew of nine, and one passenger. They encountered a gale while entering Bass Strait and ran aground on a sand bank 19 kilometres (12 mi) off Shoaly Bay on the south-east coast of Flinders Island, presumably the Vansittart Shoals, 18 June 1845. As the ship broke up, she was abandoned, all making the island safely but in so doing, both boats were damaged. The castaways came across a party of sealers who loaned them another boat, and all except Captain Marr, who was later picked up by the schooner Letitia, headed for Cape Portland, Tasmania.

== Replica ==
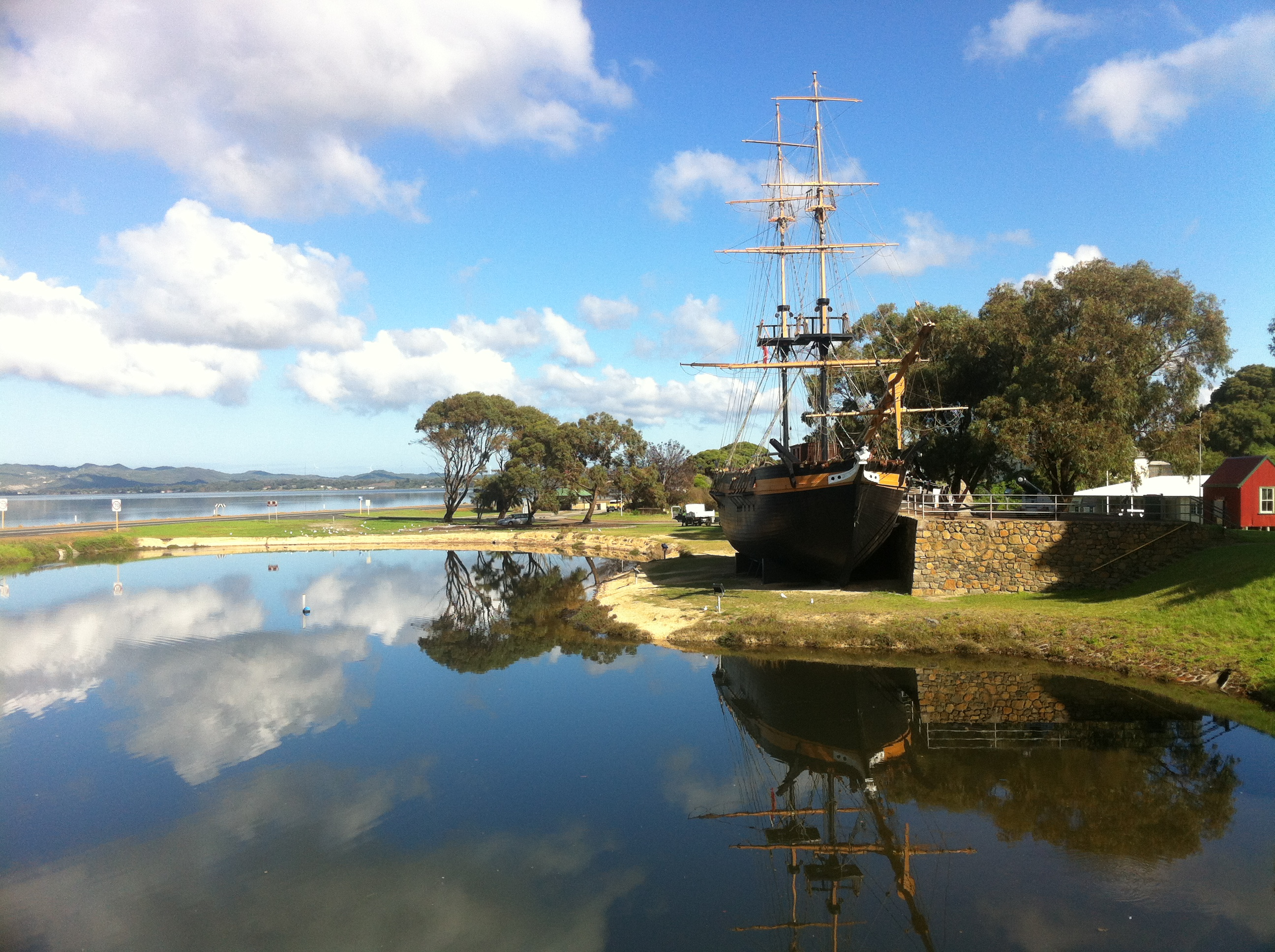
Brig Amity replica from The Residency

Discussions in Albany to construct a replica of Amity commenced in Albany in 1972 with the view to completion for the town's 1976 sesquicentennial celebrations. After funding and research had been established, construction commenced in 1975, with local boat builder Stan Austin as project supervisor and Pieter van de Brugge as leading shipwright.

The full-sized, land-mounted replica is now part of the Museum of the Great Southern, part of the Stirling Historical Precinct on Princess Royal Drive, Albany, overlooking Princess Royal Harbour. It has been positioned to give an impression of it floating in the harbour. Audio tours are available daily.
