= Albany Advertiser =

Newspaper in Albany, Western Australia

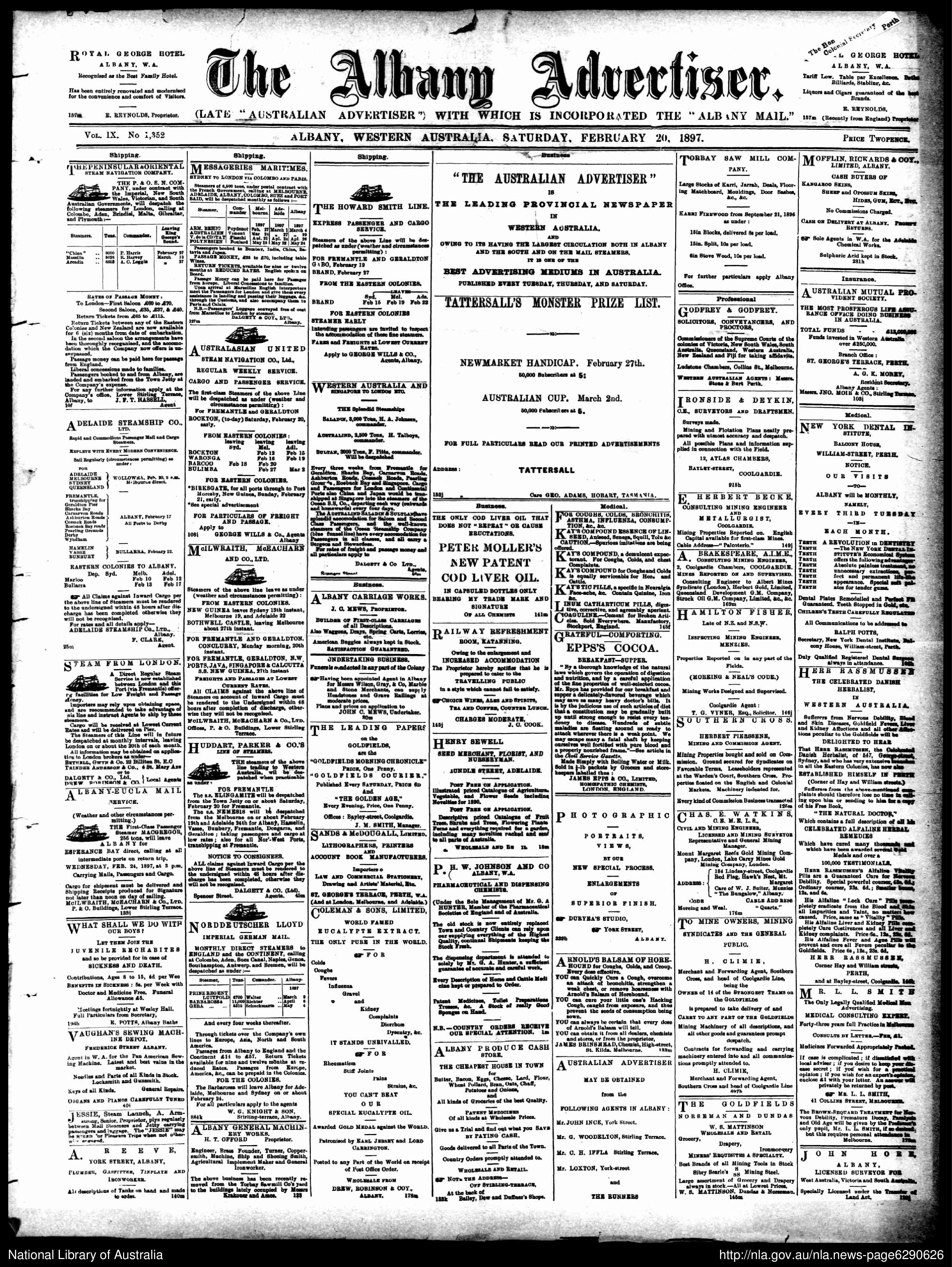
- Front cover of the first issue of the Albany Advertiser
- Type: Bi-weekly
- Owner: Seven West Media
- Founder(s): Lancel Victor De Hamel, William Forster
- Founded: 1888
- City: Albany, Western Australia (–2003); Perth, Western Australia (2003–present)
- Country: Australia

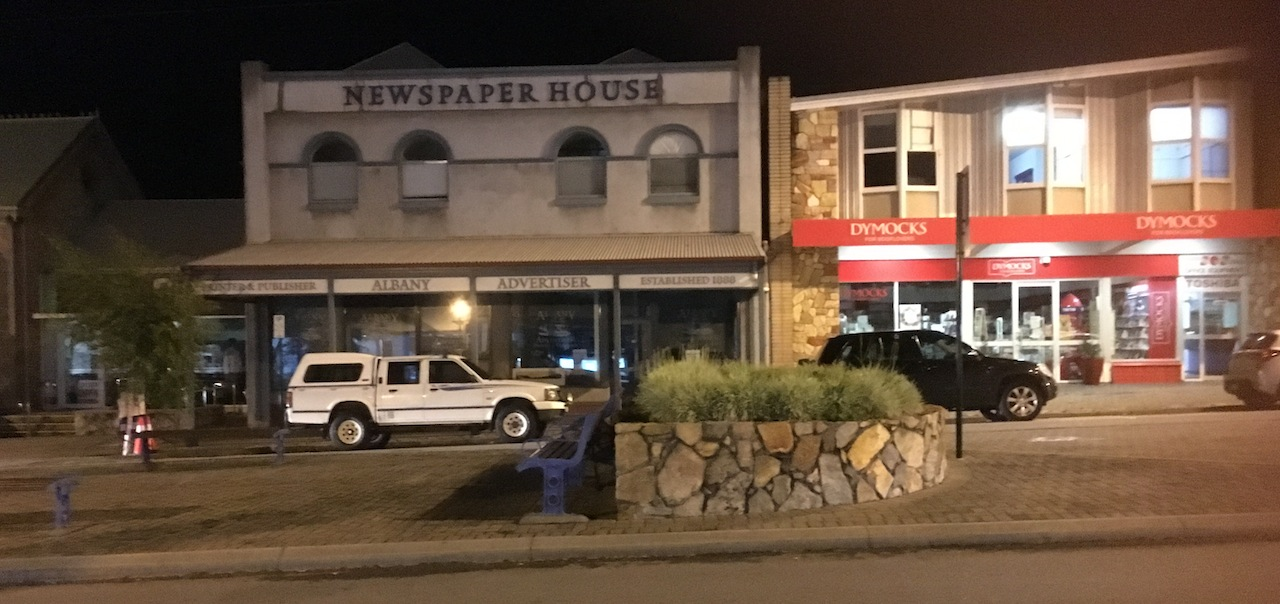
Newspaper House, York Street, Albany

The Albany Advertiser, also published as the Australian Advertiser and the Albany Advertiser and Plantagenet and Denmark Post, is a biweekly English language newspaper published for Albany and the Great Southern region in Western Australia.

First published in 1888 as the Albany Advertiser, the paper is still in circulation. The paper is the oldest continuous-running non-metropolitan newspaper in Western Australia.

The paper is printed twice weekly, on Tuesday and Thursday, and distributed to towns through the Great Southern region including Albany, Cranbrook, Mount Barker, Jerramungup, Ravensthorpe, Katanning and Walpole.

The office of the newspaper is called Newspaper House and is located in the main street York Street, Albany.

== History ==
Australian Advertiser co-founder, Lancel Victor de Hamel, arrived in Albany in 1886 and announced his intention to run for mayor. De Hamel was given little support from the only paper in town, the conservative Albany Mail and King George's Sound Advertiser. He then set up a second publication with his partner, William Forster, called the Australian Advertiser which first published on 14 May 1888. Shortly afterward De Hamel was elected as mayor. The Albany Mail was absorbed by the Australian Advertiser in September 1889.

Forster took over the paper after De Hamel's departure in 1891. He remained the editor of the paper until 1900, when he left to work on the Morning Herald in Perth. After his departure Arthur Catling took over as editor, and the paper moved to a bi-weekly format.

In February 1897 the Australian Advertiser became the Albany Advertiser. From 9 January 1924 until 24 December 1927, it was known as the Albany Advertiser and Plantagenet and Denmark Post.

== Publications ==
In the pre-first world war era, the publisher ventured into publication of "Alluring Albany", which was published in three consecutive years with the subtitle of "Handbook for the Port and Back Country and Guide to the Chief West Australian Health Resort". Photographs from the Advertiser's collection included the 1901 royal visit, the Great White Fleet visit of 1908, as well as Stirling Terrace and local hotels and businesses.

To commemorate Albany's centenary in 1927 a book with many photographs from the earlier volume included, was published.

Histories of the newspaper and tourist guides for Albany were also published by the Advertiser.

== Takeover in 1973 ==
The Robert Holmes à Court company, Bell Brothers, acquired the paper in 1973 along with local radio station 6VA.

The paper was taken over by The West Australian at some time prior to 2002; the Advertiser had a circulation of 9,000 per issue in 2003. Last printed in Albany in 2003, the paper was then printed in the suburbs of Perth, firstly in Victoria Park and since 2006 in Herdsman.

In 1981 a fire damaged the building occupied by the Advertiser.

The paper is currently owned by Seven West Media along with other Western Australian publications including The West Australian.

Circulation in 2013 was 5,576 per issue.

== Availability ==
Issues (1897–1950) of this newspaper have been digitised as part of the Australian Newspapers Digitisation Program, a project of the National Library of Australia in cooperation with the State Library of Western Australia.

Hard copy and microfilm copies of the Albany Advertiser are also available at the State Library of Western Australia.

== See also ==
- List of newspapers in Australia
- List of newspapers in Western Australia
