= Thomas Ryan (Commandant) =

Norfolk Island penal colony administrator

Major Thomas Ryan (born c. 1790; death unknown) was a soldier and penal administrator. He was acting commandant of the second convict settlement at Norfolk Island, from July 1839 until the arrival of Alexander Maconochie in March 1840.

Although he regarded the convicts as having been sent to the island for punishment, he tried to give them hope of release at some future time. Rations were increased, meals inspected, and well behaved and willing convicts were allowed to maintain gardens.
