= John Townson =

British army officer and colonial administrator (1759–1835)

3rd Lieutenant-Governor of Norfolk Island
- In office September 1796 – November 1799
- Preceded by: Philip Gidley King
- Succeeded by: Thomas Rowley

Personal details
- Born: c. 1759
- Died: 8 May 1835; Sydney, New South Wales
- Spouse: Sarah Griggs (illeg.)

John Townson (c. 1759 – 8 May 1835) was an army officer and settler in the colony of New South Wales. He entered the 18th Regiment of Foot in 1779 and was part of the Gibraltar garrison. He transferred to the New South Wales Corps in October 1789 and arrived in Sydney on the Second Fleet ship Scarborough in June 1790.

Townson spent most of his military service in the colony at Norfolk Island where he was stationed for six years and received a twenty-acre (81,000 m^{2}) lease. In 1794 he was a member of the court of inquiry investigating Lieutenant Governor King's actions during the 1793 mutiny on the island. He was promoted and captain, and from September 1796 to November 1799 acted as lieutenant-governor of Norfolk Island while King was absent in England.

His administration was generally efficient and he seems to have had a steadying influence on the population of convicts and settlers. During his regime, the only ship built on the island, the sloop Norfolk, used by Matthew Flinders to circumnavigate Van Diemen's Land, was constructed in 1798. He lacked confidence in Governor Hunter and his complaints to England played a part in Hunter's recall.

Townson left Norfolk Island in 1800 and returned to England, where through illness he retired and sold his commission in July 1803.

He returned to Sydney in 1806, and after some controversy was granted 2000 acres (8 km^{2}) in the Bexley and Hurstville districts. He sold these in 1812 and developed further grants on the Tamar River in Van Diemen's Land. Townson died in Sydney on 8 July 1835, leaving an estate worth £5,000.

Townson is described by his biographer as "an efficient, if unspectacular, administrator." Unlike many of his fellow New South Wales Corps officers, he does not seem to have been involved in the rum traffic. He was generally well liked by his contemporaries but ill-health and deafness led him to avoid public life, and earned him a reputation in his later years "of being unsettled and querulous."
