= Thomas Edward Wright =

Norfolk Island penal colony administrator

Colonel Thomas Edward Wright, soldier and penal administrator, of the 39th Regiment was the third commandant of the second convict settlement at Norfolk Island, from August 1827 to 1828.

He is reported, by Aaron Price, a convict turned Constable and Overseer, to have replaced the chain-gang's heavy irons with light irons, and encouraged the breaking of land for agriculture.

In October 1827, while walking home from a farm unarmed, Wright was assaulted with a club by an absconded convict, Patrick Clynch, but was able to fend off the blow. Clynch made several more attacks in the following days on overseers and guards, and was eventually shot dead. Although the matter was investigated at the time, it flared up more than a year later, when Wright was accused of ordering Clynch to be shot although he knew he was already in custody. He was tried for murder but the prosecution case (led by W. C. Wentworth) collapsed as it had been, according to Governor Darling, "supported by the most palpable perjury on the part of one witness".

The affair led to Wright's recall, and his actions and those of Governor Darling were vilified by local newspaper editor E. S. Hall.
