= H. Day =

Commandant of Norfolk Island

Captain H. Day, soldier and penal administrator, was commandant of the second convict settlement at Norfolk Island, during its last days from September 1853 to May 1855.

The colony was winding down, although a small number of prisoners still continued to arrive. Replacement soldiers were also required to replace those who had left for the gold fields in Victoria on visiting ships. Conditions were very much eased and the convicts were treated humanely.

By May 1855, the last of the convicts and guards were removed to Van Diemen's Land, leaving only a small caretaker party.

== Bibliography ==
- Hazzard, Margaret, Punishment Short of Death: a history of the penal settlement at Norfolk Island, Melbourne, Hyland, 1984. (ISBN 0-908090-64-1)
