= Joseph Foveaux =

British Army officer and colonial administrator (1767–1828)

Joseph Foveaux (1767 – 20 March 1846) was a soldier and convict settlement administrator in colonial New South Wales, Australia. He was also a sheep grazier and breeder, being the largest landholder in New South Wales by 1800.

== Early life ==
Foveaux was baptised on 6 April 1767 at Ampthill, Bedfordshire, England, the sixth child of Joseph Foveaux and his wife Elizabeth, née Wheeler. Family tradition maintains he was actually born almost a year earlier, on 10 April 1766.

Foveaux was an ensign in the 60th regiment and then joined the New South Wales Corps in June 1789 as lieutenant, became a captain in April 1791 and reached Sydney in 1792. There he was promoted to major in June 1796 and, as senior officer between August 1796 and November 1799, he controlled the Corps at a time when some of the senior officers were making fortunes from trading and extending their lands. By 1800 he had become the largest landholder and stock-owner in the colony.

== Norfolk Island ==
In 1800, having begun to establish a reputation as an able and efficient administrator, Foveaux offered to go to Norfolk Island as Lieutenant-Governor. Finding the island run down, he built it up with particular attention to public works, for which he earned the praise of Governor Philip Gidley King. The Australian Dictionary of Biography notes, "more questionable, however, was the severity with which he crushed convict disturbances in 1801, and the dubious morality of allowing the sale of female convicts to settlers."

Robert Hughes writes of Foveaux's governership "Norfolk Island liberated him, enabling his sadism, which had been restrained by the more public sphere of the mainland, to overflow far from courts and judges, thinly disguised as 'necessary rigour'."

Joseph Holt, a general during the Irish Rebellion of 1798, was imprisoned at Norfolk Island from 1804 to 1805. Holt wrote about the overjoyed inhabitants of the island upon Foveaux's departure, and said, "If I could have bought or borrowed a pistol, the world, I think, would soon have been rid of this man-killer, Foveaux, and with as short a warning as he gave to the two men he hung without trial."

In September 1804, Foveaux left Norfolk Island for England to attend to his private affairs and seek relief for the asthma that affected him.

== Aftermath of the Rum Rebellion ==
Having recovered, he returned to New South Wales on the Sinclair to serve as Lieutenant-Governor, but on arrival in July 1808, he found Governor William Bligh under arrest by officers of the New South Wales Corps in the event known as the Rum Rebellion. Foveaux assumed control, stating that he was not favouring either Bligh or the rebels. His control was characterised by a desire for cheap and efficient administration, improvement of public works, and encouragement of small-holders.

In January 1809, the acting Lieutenant-Governor, Colonel William Paterson, returned and Foveaux remained to assist him and his successor, Major-General Lachlan Macquarie.

Macquarie was impressed with Foveaux's administration and put him forward as David Collins's successor as Lieutenant Governor of Van Diemen's Land (Tasmania), because he could think of no one more fitting, and considered that he could not have acted otherwise with regard to Bligh. However, when Foveaux returned to England in 1810, Macquarie's recommendation was put aside. In 1811, Foveaux was promoted to inspecting field officer in Ireland and in 1814 became a major-general.

== Later life ==
Foveaux pursued an uneventful military career after that, rising to the rank of lieutenant-general in 1830. In 1814 he married Ann Sherwin, his partner since 1793. Foveaux had an adopted daughter, born Ann Noble Rose in 1801.

Foveaux died at New Road, London on 20 March 1846 and was buried in Kensal Green Cemetery.

== Surry Hills ==
Surry Hills near the centre of Sydney was once a farming area owned by Foveaux. His property was known as Surrey Hills Farm, named after the Surrey Hills in Surrey, England. The main east–west street through the suburb is Foveaux Street from Bourke Street to Elizabeth Street, which gave its name to Kylie Tennant's 1939 novel Foveaux about inner city slum life.

== Legacy ==
Foveaux Strait in New Zealand is named in his honour, as are streets in the Sydney suburbs of Airds, Barden Ridge, Bella Vista, Cromer, Harrington Park, Lurnea and Surry Hills, the Maitland suburb of Metford, and the Canberra suburb of Ainslie.

Government offices
Preceded by William Paterson	Lieutenant-Governor of New South Wales; 1808–1809	Succeeded by Sir Maurice O'Connell
