= Vance Young Donaldson =

Commandant of Norfolk Island (born c. 1791)

Major Vance Young Donaldson, (born 1791, date of death unknown) soldier and penal administrator, was born in County Tyrone and entered the army at the age of thirteen, serving in the 57th Regiment under Wellington.

He led his regiment to Norfolk Island in March 1826 as the second commandant of the second convict settlement. His first act was to arrange for the thirty women on the island to be returned to Sydney as Governor Darling disapproved of their presence at this "place of the extremest punishment short of death".

In September 1826 an attempt was made by the convicts to escape from the island by boat, having been told that there was an island within a hundred miles where they could safely hide and never be found. While most of the soldiers were chasing two absconders, about thirty prisoners seized and bound their overseers, robbed the Stores for provisions and weapons, and put three boats to sea, killing a soldier. Donaldson and soldiers followed them to the nearby small and uninhabited Phillip Island, where they were captured. The ringleaders were sent to Sydney for trial, where they were sentenced to death.

Donaldson left Norfolk Island on 3 February 1828.
