= Joseph Wakefield =

Norfolk Island penal colony administrator

Joseph Wakefield, (23 March 1793 – 17 May 1840)

Born 23 March 1793 son of William & Elizabeth (Swift) Wakefield in Minworth, Warwickshire United Kingdom.

Purchased rank of Cornet in the 13th Light Dragoons July 1814, received Waterloo 1815 medal, gained rank of Lieutenant without purchase 29 August 1815. Transferred to the 19th Lancers without paying the difference June 1816, Captain by purchase 29 July 1819, placed of half pay with disbandment of the corps and transferred to the 39th Regiment November 1822.

6 December 1825 Captain Wakefield sailed onboard the convict transport Woodman. Delivery of the 146 male prisoners occurred at Hobart town (Tasmania) April 1826, then on to Sydney June the same year.

Soldier and penal administrator, of the 39th Regiment was the acting commandant of the second convict settlement at Norfolk Island, from February 1829 to 27 May 1829.

By this time there were about 200 convicts on the island. Several buildings had been constructed of locally produced timber, stone, shingles and lime, including a prisoners' barracks, three-storey barracks for troops, quarters for civil officers and a military hospital. The remains of some of these buildings can still be seen at Kingston. Wakefield was soon replaced by the man who had sought the commandant's position since 1825, James Morisset.

Wakefield remained at Norfolk Island as supervisor of works possibly beyond November 1829.

In July 1832 Wakefield sailed with other detachments from the 39th Regiment in New South Wales to India.
