= Warden (disambiguation) =

Warden is the title of various officials.

Warden or The Warden may also refer to:

== Arts and entertainment ==
- The Warden, an 1855 novel by Anthony Trollope
- The Warden (TV series), a BBC 1951 mini-series adaptation of Trollope's novel
- The Warden (film), a 2019 Iranian mystery drama
- The Warden (Superjail!), a character in the American animated television series Superjail!
- Elizabeth Warden (Keeping Up Appearances), a character from the British television show Keeping Up Appearances
- Chief ARP Warden Hodges, a recurring character in the British sitcom Dad's Army
- Warden Walker, a character in the novel Holes
- Warden, a hostile mob from the Deep Dark in Minecraft

== Places ==
- Mount Warden, Marie Byrd Land, Antarctica
- Warden Pass, Coats Land, Antarctica, a mountain pass
- Lake Warden (Western Australia), a salt lake
- Warden, Quebec, Canada, a village
- Warden Peak, British Columbia, Canada
- Warden, Kent, England, a village and parish
- Warden, Northumberland, England, a village
- Warden Hill, a hill in the Lincolnshire Wolds, England
- Warden, Free State, South Africa, a town
- Warden, Louisiana, United States, an unincorporated community
- Warden, Washington, United States, a city
- Warden, West Virginia, United States, an unincorporated community
- Warden Lake, West Virginia, a reservoir
- Warden Branch, Missouri, United States, a stream

== People ==
- Warden (surname)
- Warden (given name)

== Transportation ==
- Warden Avenue, a major north-south road in Scarborough, Ontario, Canada
- Warden station, a subway station in Toronto, Ontario, Canada
- Warden railway station, a former station in Warden, Northumberland, England
- Warden Bridge, a road bridge across the River South Tyne near Warden, Northumberland

== Other uses ==
- Warden (software), a video game cheating prevention system used by Blizzard Entertainment
- Warden or Wardon Abbey, a Cistercian abbey in Bedfordshire, England
- Warden Energy Centre, a power station on Warden Avenue, Markham, Ontario, Canada
- Warden pear, any of a number of pear varieties that do not truly ripen and must be cooked to be edible

== See also ==
- Warden message, an important message from the United States State Department about safety or travel information for U.S. citizens abroad
- Old Warden, Bedfordshire, England, a village and civil parish
- Worden (disambiguation)
