= Warden (surname) =

Warden is a surname. Notable people with the surname include:

- Allen F. Warden (1852–1927), American politician and newspaper editor
- David Bailie Warden (1772–1845), Irish republican insurgent, US consul and academic
- Don Warden (1929–2017), American country steel guitarist and manager of Porter Wagoner and Dolly Parton
- Elizabeth Warden (swimmer) (born 1978), Canadian swimmer
- Eric Warden (born 1992), Ghanaian footballer
- Florence Warden (1857–1929), English actress and novelist
- Frederick Warden (1807–1869), Royal Navy rear-admiral, Commander-in-Chief of the Channel Fleet
- George Warden, an alias of Big Nose George (1834–1881), American Old West cattle rustler and highwayman
- Henry Douglas Warden (1800–1856), British Resident of the Orange River Sovereignty, founder of Bloemfontein
- Henry Edward Warden (1915–2007), United States Air Force colonel, often credited as the "Father of the B-52 bomber"
- Jack Warden (1920–2006), American character actor
- Jake Warden (born 2002), American beauty YouTuber and makeup artist
- James Warden (disambiguation)
- John Warden (disambiguation)
- Jon Warden (born 1946), American Major League Baseball pitcher
- Kathy J. Warden (born 1970/71), American business executive, chief executive officer and president of Northrop Grumman
- May Warden (1891–1978), British actress
- Peter Warden (born 1941), British hurdler and former National Coach
- Rick Warden (born 1971), English actor
- William Warden (printer) (1761–1786), American printer in Boston, Massachusetts
- William Warden (Royal Navy officer) (1777–1849), Scottish naval surgeon who published a popular account of his conversations with Napoleon
- Winter Warden (1860–1936), Australian politician

== See also ==
- Worden (disambiguation), which includes a list of people with the surname or given name
