= John Warden (disambiguation) =

John Warden (1841–1906) was a Union Army soldier during the American Civil War.

John Warden may also refer to:

- John A. Warden III (born 1943), retired colonel in the United States Air Force
- John Warden (MP) (died 1628), English politician
- John Warden (footballer) (born 1951), Australian rules footballer

== See also ==
- Jon Warden (born 1946), American Major League Baseball pitcher
- John Lorimer Worden (1818-1897), United States Navy rear admiral
