= Henry Warden =

Henry Warden is the name of:

- Henry Douglas Warden (1800–1856), British Resident of the Orange River Sovereignty, founder of Bloemfontein
- Henry Edward Warden (1915–2007), United States Air Force colonel, often credited as the "Father of the B-52" bomber
