= Sovereign =

Title applied variously in politics

Sovereign is a title that can be applied to the highest leader in various categories. The word is borrowed from Old French souverain, which is ultimately derived from the Latin superānus, meaning 'above'.

The roles of a sovereign vary from monarch, ruler or head of state to head of municipal government or head of a chivalric order. As a result, the word sovereignty has more recently also come to mean independence or autonomy.

== Head of state ==
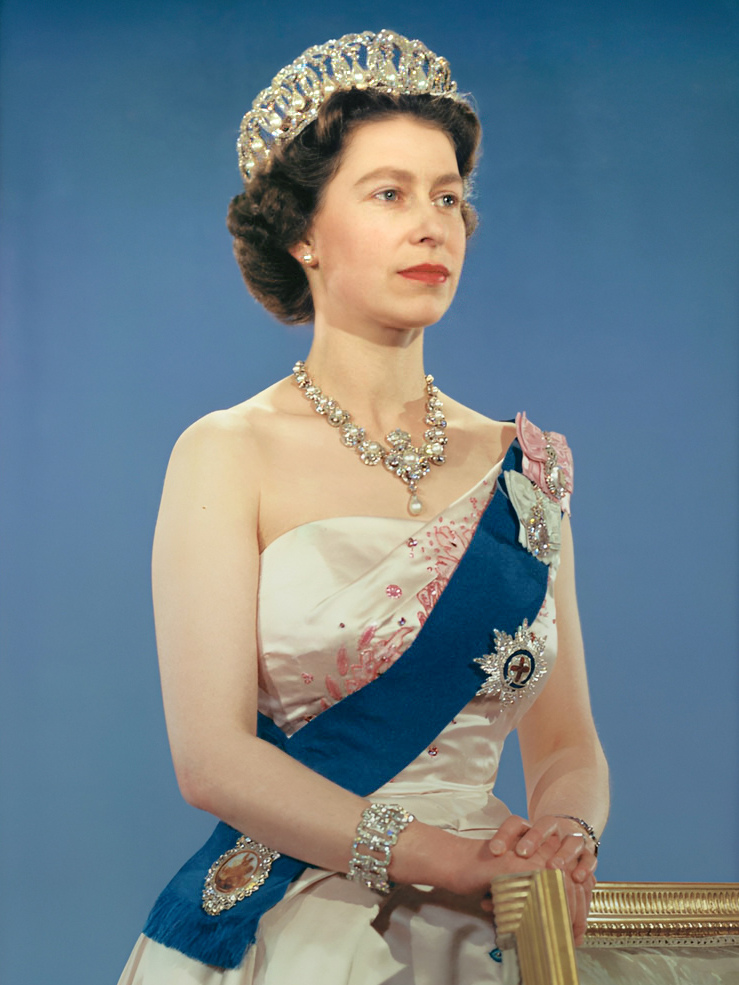
Queen Elizabeth II was the sovereign of 32 independent realms over the course of her reign, with her role in each realm separate and legally distinct.

The word sovereign is frequently used synonymously with monarch. There are numerous titles in a monarchical rule which can belong to the sovereign. The sovereign is the autonomous head of the state. Examples of the various titles in modern sovereign leaders are:

Emperor	Naruhito, Emperor of Japan	Sultan	Hassanal Bolkiah, Sultan of Brunei
King	Jigme Khesar Namgyel Wangchuck, King of Bhutan	King	Frederik X, King of Denmark
Prince	Albert II, Prince of Monaco	Co-Prince	Josep-Lluís Serrano Pentinat, Co-Prince of Andorra
Grand Duke	Guillaume V, Grand Duke of Luxembourg	Pope	Leo XIV, sovereign of the Vatican City State

In some settings the use of the words Sovereign lady (sometimes with a capital L in lady) have been used referring to female sovereigns, notably in Charles III's proclamation of accession.

== Chivalric orders ==
The title sovereign is used by some orders of chivalry to denote their supreme authority or head. In dynastic orders, this position is often held by the reigning monarch or the head of a royal house, who may be styled the "Sovereign of the Order". In other orders, the equivalent office is that of "grand master". The terms are therefore not universally interchangeable and their usage depends on the constitution and traditions of the particular order.

In the Sovereign Military Order of Malta, the head of the order bears the title Sovereign Grand Master, reflecting both the office of grand master and the Order's status as an independent sovereign subject of international law.

Examples of the sovereign of a chivalric order are:

- Charles III, King of the United Kingdom: current Sovereign of the Order of the Garter
- Karl von Habsburg, current Sovereign of the Austrian branch of the Order of the Golden Fleece
- Georg Friedrich, Prince of Prussia, current Sovereign of the Order of the Black Eagle, Order of the Red Eagle, Order of Louise, Order of the Crown
- Caroline of Baden, Sovereign of the Order of Saint Elizabeth
- Duarte Nuno, Duke of Braganza, Sovereign of the Order of Saint Isabel

== Municipal government ==
As chief officer of municipal government, the sovereign had duties and responsibilities deriving from the charter which established the local town borough or council. This was commonly used throughout Ireland. This usage was less common in the United Kingdom and occasionally meant a marcher lord.

=== Characteristics ===
The candidate for this position was elected by the freemen and burgesses of the town, borough and city councils and had to be a burgess himself. And in later years he also had to be approved by the patron. The level of responsibility ranged from enacting by-laws about tolls up to the death penalty. Some charters established the sovereign as the local magistrate or justice of the peace. The office generally had no salary though some patrons provided a stipend to the sovereign in their borough. In some localities the sovereign was appointed directly by the patron of the borough which allowed him to influence the election of the local MP. Once the parliamentary franchise was lost with the Acts of Union 1800, the role became largely ceremonial or forgotten.

The title of the chief officer of a city council has become known as a mayor. In some municipal boroughs the titles borough master or Burgomaster, bailiff, portreeve, warden and provost were used interchangeably with mayor and sovereign.

=== History ===
Ireland had established self-governing municipal boroughs which gave a city-state status to the locality in existence since the Norman conquest. These were most typically in the denser populated provinces of Munster and Leinster. The provision of the borough and the corporation was established through a charter, the granting of which was known as incorporation. Freemen and burgesses were the usual governing members of the council and elected their chief officer, the Sovereign. In earlier incarnations the council also managed the law court known as the "hundred court" and dealt with local administrative and legal business. Boroughs also elected the local MP. Positions on the council were predominantly from among the wealthy and related families in the area.

The first mention of the sovereign in Kilkenny dates from 1231. The Liber Primus Kilkenniensis is a contemporaneously written account of the proceedings of Kilkenny municipality beginning in 1230 and running to 1538. Attempts have been made to identify the names of Kilkenny's sovereigns and currently there is a list of the names of 244 sovereigns from 1282 to 1608. At that point a new charter was established for the town and in 1609 the first mayor of the City of Kilkenny is elected.

=== Weakening power ===
Early Irish borough had a city-state status; however, with the unification of Ireland under the crown in 1603 they were transformed into more ordinary municipal towns on the English model. Part of this was to reduce the autonomy of the Irish borough and partly to establish the new rules by which the planted towns of Ireland were to operate. Since the MPs to the Irish parliament were elected by the borough council, and to prevent a Catholic majority there, additional boroughs were created in areas with a strong Protestant base. A direct result of this was the Protestant majority of 232 to 100 in the 1613 House of Commons. The new charters placed the government of the borough with the Sovereign and twelve chief burgesses, who are to elect all the rest and stipulated that all had to conform to the established church by taking the Oath of Supremacy.

Sir John Davies, Attorney General for Ireland, wrote "the newly erected boroughs ... will be perpetual seminaries of Protestant burgesses".

Historically the number of boroughs varied considerably. There were 117 boroughs in Ireland from 1685 to 1800. Prior to the passing of the Municipal Corporations Act 1835, there were sixty-eight borough corporations in Ireland. As each of the changes and new charters were brought in and with the loss of the parliamentary franchise, sovereigns became less powerful and more ceremonial.

=== Legacy ===
There is a sailing race held in Kinsale which references back to the chief officer of the town council. When looking to name a new trophy the local yacht club discovered that the 'Sovereign of Kinsale' used to put up a trophy for a sailing race in the late 1700s. The result is that the race and trophy today is known as The Sovereign's cup. Kinsale had been given its charter to set up a borough led by a Sovereign around 1319.

== See also ==
- Bailiff
- Borough
- Burgomaster
- Mayor
- Municipal borough
- Portreeve
- Provost
- Warden
