= Lake Warden (Western Australia) =

Lake in Western Australia

- Location in Western Australia
- Interactive map of Lake Warden
- Location: Goldfields-Esperance, Western Australia
- Coordinates: 33°49′05″S 121°52′22″E
- Type: Saline
- Primary inflows: Groundwater and surface runoff
- Catchment area: 212,000 ha (523,863 acres)
- Basin countries: Australia
- Designation: Lake Warden Nature Reserve
- Max. length: 3 km (2 mi)
- Max. width: 2 km (1 mi)
- Surface area: 590 ha (1,458 acres)
- Average depth: 2 m (7 ft)
- Surface elevation: 5 m (16 ft)

Ramsar Wetland
- Official name: Lake Warden system
- Designated: 7 June 1990
- Reference no.: 485

Lake Warden is a salt lake in the Goldfields-Esperance region of Western Australia. It and its associated wetlands are protected in a nature reserve; they were recognised as being of international importance under the Ramsar Convention through designation of the Lake Warden System on 7 June 1990 as Ramsar Site 485. The lake is also a DIWA-listed wetland.

== Location ==
The lake is about 5 kilometres (3 mi) north of Esperance, between the two main access roads to the town, the South Coast and Coolgardie-Esperance Highways. It lies in the Esperance Plains IBRA bioregion, and in the Esperance Lakes Nature Reserve.

Lake Warden was so named in 1848 by the explorer John Septimus Roe in recognition of Lady Ann Warden Spencer, wife of Sir Richard Spencer, the Government Resident in Albany, for whom the nearby Lake Spencer (now known as Pink Lake) was named.

== Description ==
The lake has an average depth of 2 metres (6 ft 7 in), which has been slowly increasing since recording first began in 1979. The average depth of the lake is now more than 1 metre (3 ft 3 in) higher than it was, mostly as a result of deforestation that has led to a greater amount of run-off. As well as Lake Warden itself, the 2,000-hectare (4,900-acre) Ramsar site includes the associated system of saline lakes and marsh areas behind beach-front dunes. The Lake Warden system is hydrologically complex with seven main lakes and over 90 smaller lakes creating diverse wetland habitats. As well as Warden, significant lakes in the system include Windabout, Woody, Station, Mullet and Wheatfield Lakes.

The catchment for the lake covers an area of 212,000 hectares (523,863 acres) of which 80% is agricultural land, of which 95% has been cleared.

=== Flora and fauna ===
Saltwater paperbark trees grow the water's edge in all the wetlands. sedges and rushes also grow around the shoreline in the tree zone. Other trees include stout paperbark and red-eyed wattle blending into low woodland of showy banksia or mallee eucalypts. At the eastern end of the wetland system the trees are replaced by samphire, especially Tecticornia and Sarcocornia species. Higher parts of the marsh are dominated by the grass Stipa luncifolia while austral seabite occurs in areas fed by springs.

The site regularly supports up to 20–30,000 waterbirds. Numerically significant species include the Australian shelduck, black swan, chestnut teal, grey teal, freckled duck, musk duck, pink-eared duck, hardhead, banded stilt, hoary-headed grebe, Australian pelican and yellow-billed spoonbill. The system also supports an important population of the hooded plover. The global population of this threatened Australian endemic species is less than 10,500 individual birds, while the Western Australian population numbers less than 6000. Over 240 hooded plovers have been recorded on one occasion at Lake Warden, constituting 2.4% of the global population and 4% of the Western Australian population. The Recherche Cape Barren goose, listed as vulnerable under the Commonwealth Environment Protection and Biodiversity Conservation Act 1999, was recorded at Lake Warden Nature Reserve in surveys undertaken in 1981–85.

The lake has been identified by BirdLife International as an Important Bird Area (IBA) because it has supported over 1% of the world populations of hooded plovers, musk ducks, and sometimes banded stilts.

== Gallery ==
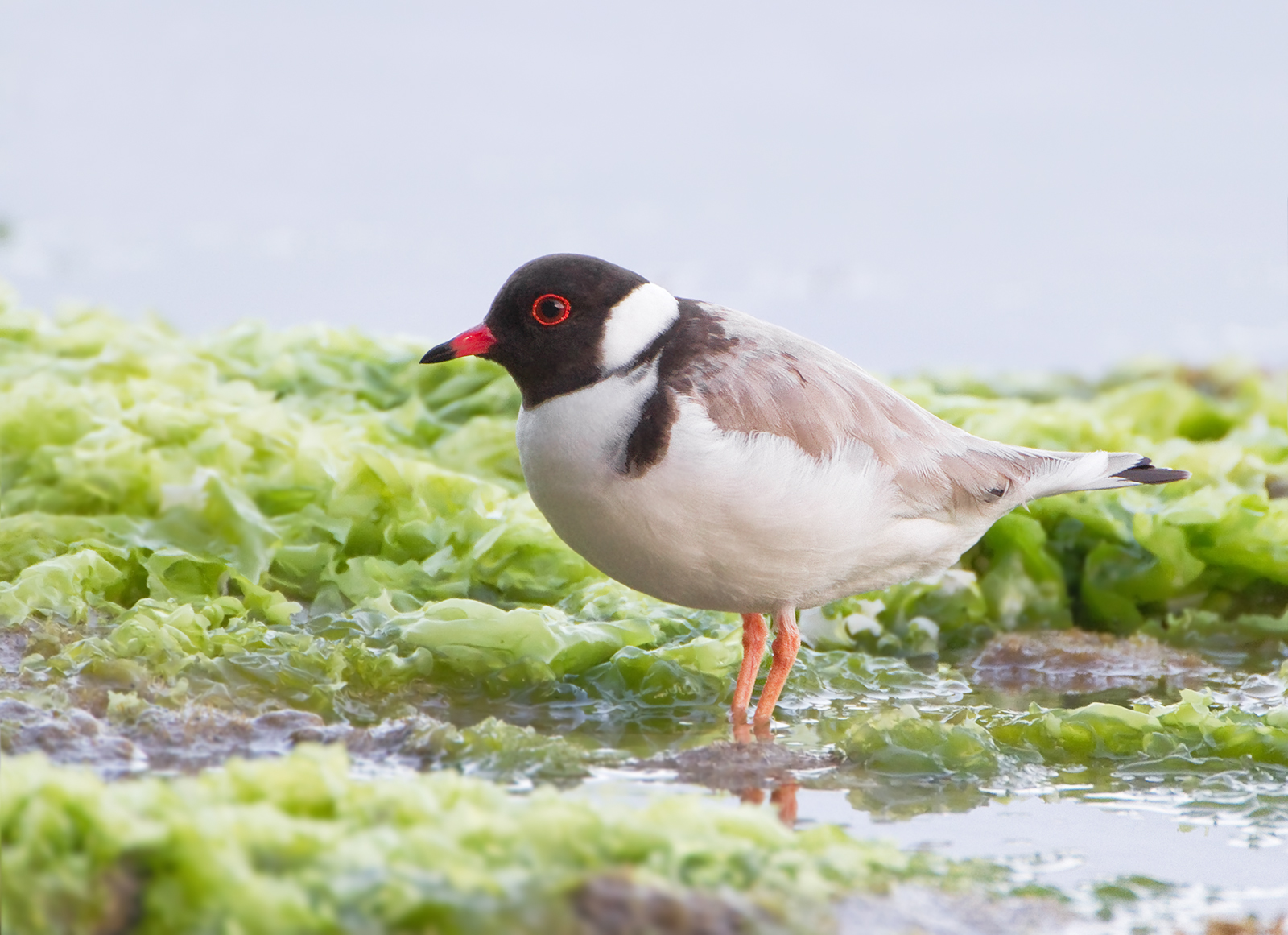
The lake is an important site for hooded plovers

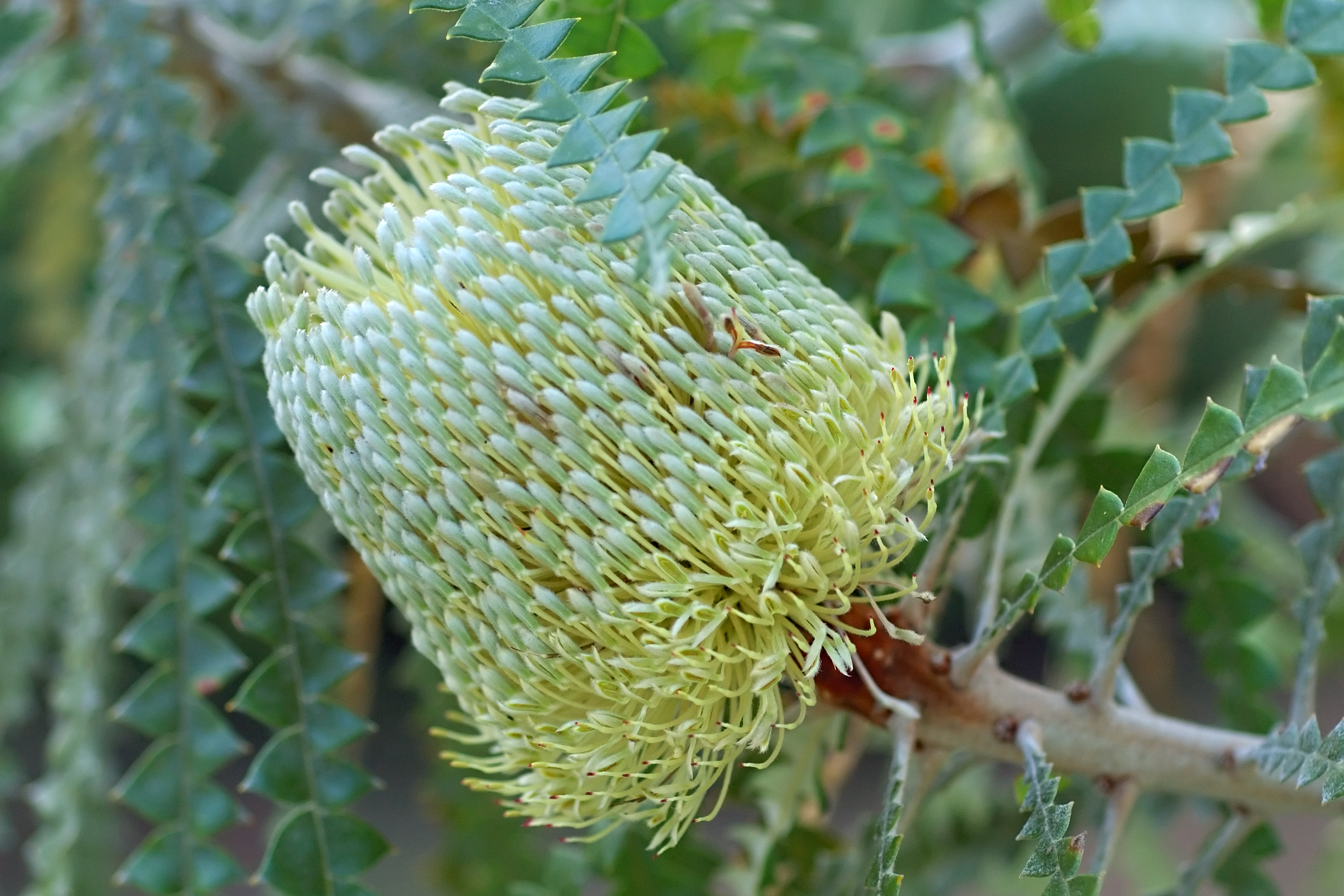
Showy banksia (Banksia speciosa) flower

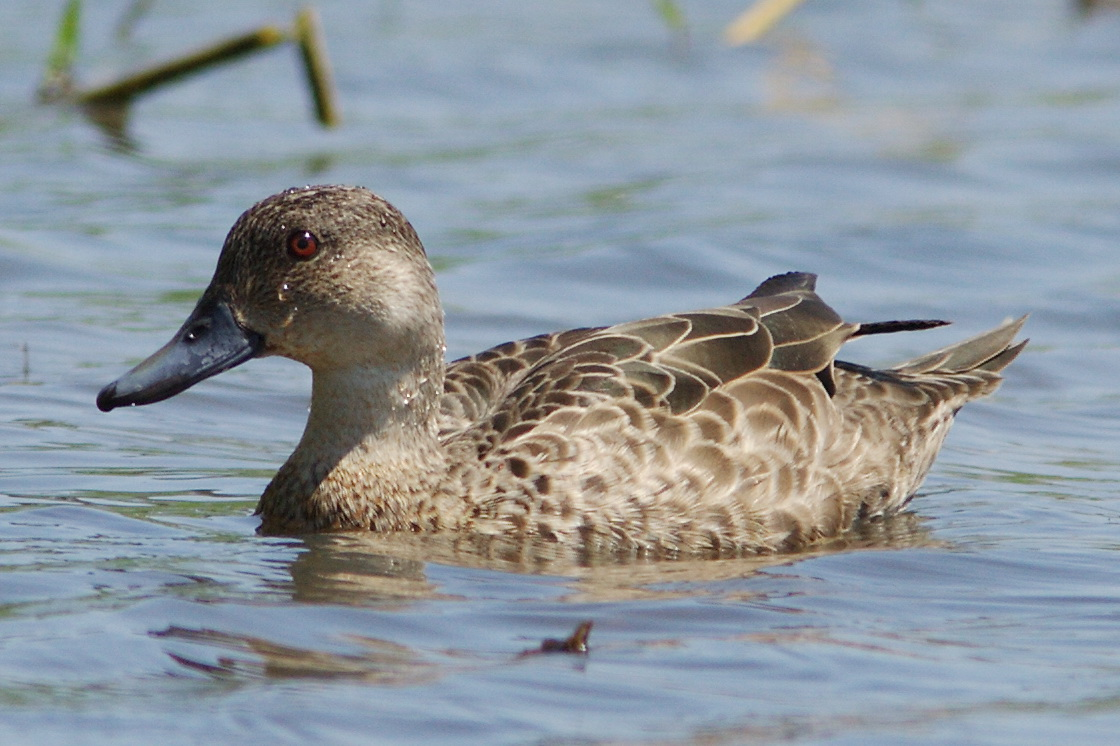
Grey teal

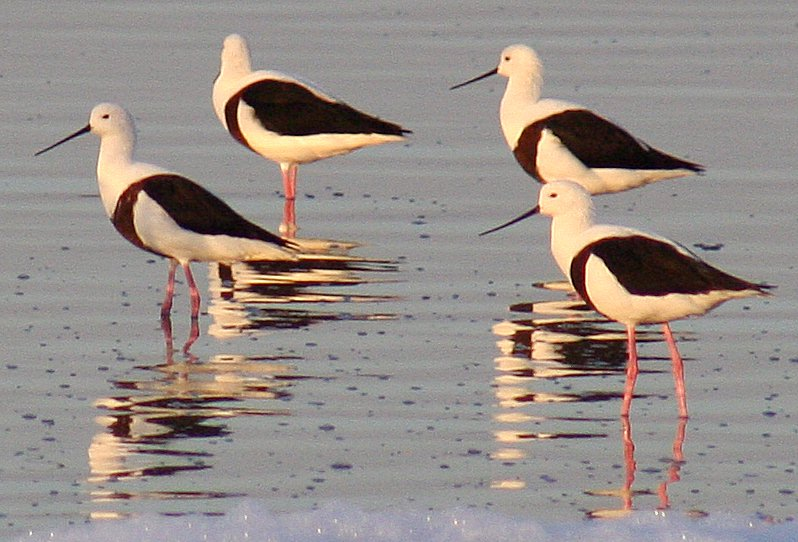
Banded stilts

== See also ==
- List of lakes of Australia § Western Australia
