= Worden =

Worden may refer to:

== People ==
- Worden Day (1912–1986), American painter, printmaker, and sculptor
- Alfred Worden (1932–2020), United States astronaut
- Dennis Worden, American comics artist
- Hank Worden (1901–1992), American actor
- James Worden (1819–1884), American politician, lawyer and Indiana Supreme Court justice
- John Lorimer Worden (1818–1897), American Civil War admiral, commander of the Monitor in its battle with the Confederate Virginia (formerly Merrimack)
- Marc Worden (born 1976), Canadian-American actor
- Minky Worden, American human rights advocate and author
- Nigel Worden (born 1955), British/South African historian
- Pete Worden (born 1949), director of NASA's Ames Research Center
- Robert Worden (1809–1893), American politician
- Sarah A. Worden (1855-1918), American painter and art instructor
- Willard Worden (1868-1946), American photographer

== Places ==
=== United States ===
- Worden, Illinois, a village
- Worden, Kansas, an unincorporated community
- Worden, Michigan, an unincorporated community
- Worden, Montana, a census-designated place
- Worden, Oregon, an unincorporated community
- Worden, Wisconsin, a town
- Worden Field, a grass field on the campus of the United States Naval Academy in Annapolis, Maryland
- Worden Pond, Rhode Island, a lake

=== Elsewhere ===
- Wörden, a subdivision of Nachrodt-Wiblingwerde, North Rhine-Westphalia, Germany
- Worden Park, Leyland, Lancashire, England

== Other uses ==
- USS Worden, several ships
- Worden High School and Worden Sports College, former names of Academy@Worden, Leyland, Lancashire, England
- Worden (horse), a French Thoroughbred racehorse

== See also ==
- Warden (disambiguation)
- Werden (disambiguation)
