= Woody Lake =

Lake in Western Australia

- Location in Western Australia
- Interactive map of Woody Lake
- Location: Goldfields-Esperance, Western Australia
- Coordinates: 33°48′49″S 121°54′52″E
- Type: Saline
- Primary inflows: Groundwater and surface runoff
- Basin countries: Australia
- Surface area: 40.1 hectares (99 acres)
- Average depth: 1 metre (3 ft)
- Max. depth: 3 metres (10 ft)

Woody Lake is a salt lake in the Goldfields-Esperance region of Western Australia, approximately 7 kilometres (4 mi) north east of Esperance. The lake is between Lake Wheatfield to the east and Windabout Lake to the west.

The lake covers an area of 40.1 hectares (99 acres) and is situated within the Woody Lake Nature Reserve, which occupies an area of 565 hectares (1,396 acres). The reserve was originally gazetted as an "A" class nature reserve in 1970. It was gazetted again in 1978 with the purpose of "Recreation and Conservation of Flora and Fauna" when a 300-metre (328 yd) wide limited access area on the north-east side of Wheatfield Lake was gazetted for recreational use. The reserve incorporates most of Windabout Lake, Woody Lake and Wheatfield Lake. The permanent wetlands formed by these lakes and Lake Warden form the Lake Warden System Ramsar site. The wetlands are connected by a series of channels with surface water from Coramup Creek entering the system at Lake Wheatfield and the outflow moving from east to west through Lake Wheatfield directly into Woody Lake via a well defined channel. Woody Lake then overflows into Windabout Lake, which has previously into Lake Warden in high rainfall years. The lakes are saline with Woody Lake having an average salinity of 7.37 parts per thousand. Seasonal and annual rainfall determine the average maximum depths of the lakes which vary from being dry in the summer to over one metre in depth in winter. At least 59 species of waterbird have been recorded in the Lake Warden, Woody Lake and Mullet Lake Nature Reserves.

== See also ==
- List of lakes of Australia § Western Australia
