= James Warden (Royal Navy officer) =

Royal Navy officer (1736–1792)

Lieutenant James Warden (1736–1792) was a Royal Navy officer and Lord of the manor of Charmouth. He died in a duel after an argument with a neighbouring landowner.

== Life ==
James Warden had enjoyed a distinguished career in the Royal Navy as a commissioned officer, seeing action in both the Seven Years' War and the American War of Independence. He was created lieutenant in the year 1760.

He married Elizabeth Newell and had three children, William Weeks Wharton (born 1766), Ann (1764) and Hannah (1763).

In 1783, Warden bought the manor of Charmouth and soon fell out with many of the local inhabitants. He objected to a number of local rates and elections at parish meetings, he took legal action against the vicar and others for removing sand from the beach and he also disinherited his son.

== Death ==
Warden had an altercation with a neighbouring landowner, Norman Bond. When Warden and Bond met in the street, an argument ensued in which Warden became extremely abusive and threatened to shoot Bond's dogs. Bond demanded Warden apologise, Warden refused, and so Bond challenged Warden to a duel. The time and place were quickly set and the duellers met at Hunters' Lodge on the morning of 28 April 1792.

According to contemporary sources, Warden's wife, Elizabeth, did not oppose the duel, and in fact, seemed to support it. She made no attempt to alert the authorities about the impending bloodshed, even though one of her neighbours was a magistrate. She was the one who had obtained the pistols for the duel. On the day of the duel, as Bond had issued the challenge, Warden took the first shot. Bond had a narrow escape as the ball passed straight through his hat. Bond now took his shot and Warden fell to the ground. He had been shot through the heart and died almost instantly. Bond reportedly fled to Barbados.

There is a memorial tomb for James Warden in the churchyard of the St Andrew's Church at Charmouth.

== See also ==
- Lady Ann Warden Spencer, his granddaughter
- Lady Eliza Lucy Grey, his great-granddaughter
