= Werden (disambiguation) =

Werden, Essen, is a borough in the city of Essen, Germany.

Werden may also refer to:

== People ==
- Asa Werden (1779–1866), Canadian politician
- Carla Overbeck (born 1968), née Werden, American soccer coach and former player
- Chester Howell Werden (1857–1930), American politician
- Frieda Werden (born 1947), American radio personality
- Jacob van Werden (died c. 1669), Flemish draughtsman, cartographer, military engineer and archer
- Sir John Werden, 1st Baronet (1640–1716). English barrister, judge, politician and diplomat
- Perry Werden (1865–1934), American baseball player
- Robert Werden (c. 1622–1690), Royalist officer during the English Civil War
- Sybil Werden (1924–2007), German dancer and actor

== Other uses ==
- Werden baronets, a English baronetcy

== See also ==
- Werden Abbey, a Benedictine monastery in Werden, Essen
- Worden (disambiguation)
