= John A. Warden III =

American air force officer

John Ashley Warden III
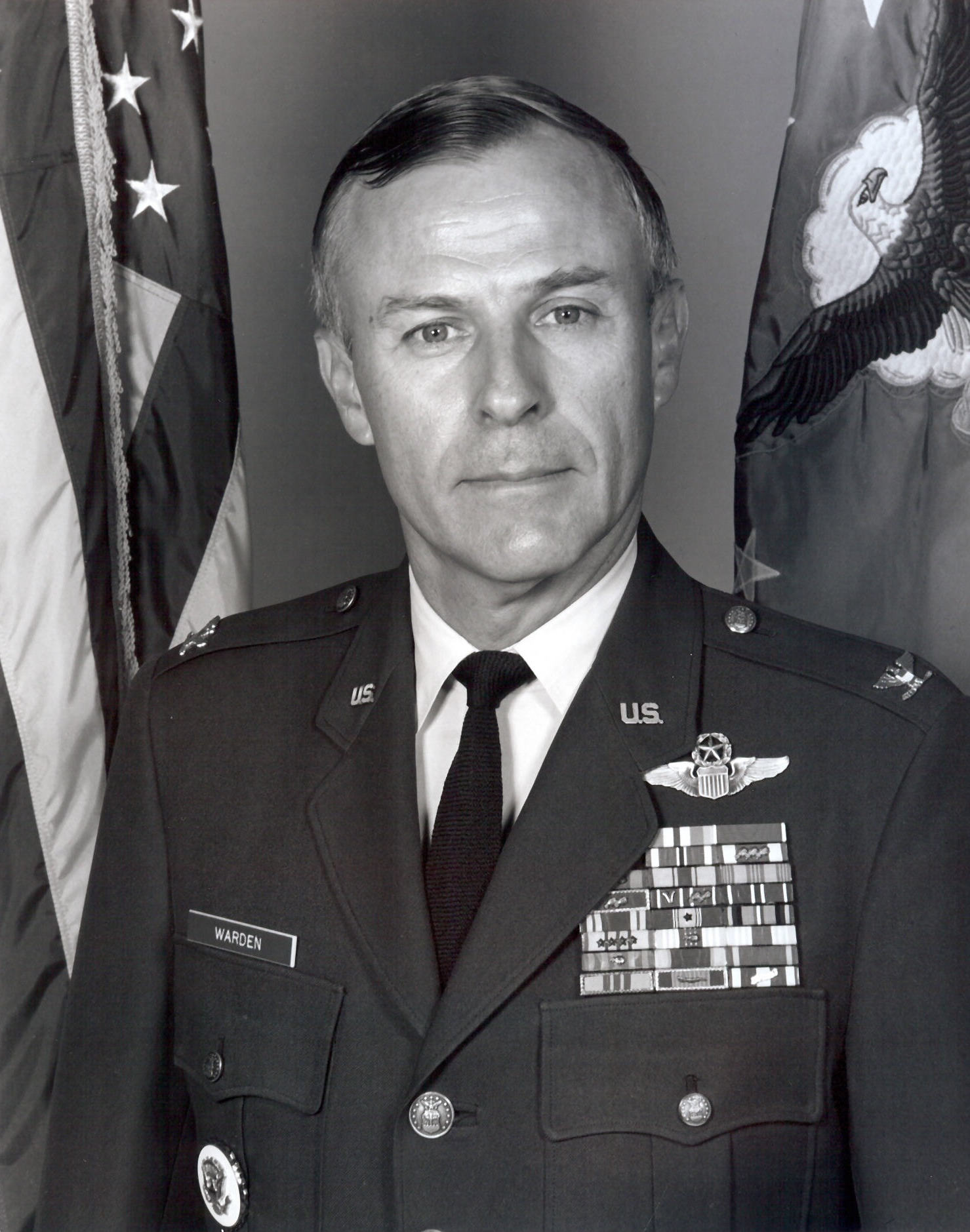
- Colonel Warden as Commandant of the Air Command and Staff College (1992)
- Born: December 21, 1943 (age 82); McKinney, Texas
- Relatives: Brigadier General John A. Warden, US Army; Colonel Pete Warden, U.S. Air Force; Lieutenant Colonel John A. Warden IV, U.S. Air Force
- Military career
- Allegiance: United States of America
- Branch: United States Air Force
- Service years: 1965–1995
- Rank: Colonel
- Units: 334th Tactical Fighter Squadron; 23rd Tactical Air Support; 401st TFW; Pentagon; Eglin AFB; Moody AFB; Decimomannu AFB; National War College; 36th TFW; Pentagon
- Commands: Air Command and Staff College; 36th TFW
- Conflicts: Vietnam War; Gulf War
- Awards: Distinguished Service Medal; Defense Superior Service Medal; Legion of Merit; Distinguished Flying Cross; Air Medal (11)
- Other work: CEO Venturist Inc., Montgomery, Alabama

John Ashley Warden III (born December 21, 1943) is a retired colonel in the United States Air Force. Warden is a graduate of the United States Air Force Academy. His Air Force career spanned 30 years, from 1965 to 1995, and included tours in Vietnam, Germany, Spain, Italy, and Korea, as well as many assignments within the continental United States. Warden completed a number of assignments in the Pentagon, was a Special Assistant for Policy Studies and National Security Affairs to the Vice President of the United States, and was Commandant of the Air Command and Staff College.

John Warden has been called "the leading air power theorist in the U.S. Air Force in the second half of the twentieth century". He has also been called "one of the most creative airmen of our times. John Warden is not just a creative airman; he is one of America's premier strategic thinkers".

"Warden's career was marked with brilliance and controversy, and to this day his name inspires both warm affection and cold contempt in the defense establishment. He was, and still is a controversial and influential figure in the defense establishment in general, and the U.S. Air Force in particular".

His impact on the future of air power in the United States Air Force is still being assessed, but "several distinguished military historians, officers, and other experts have concluded that Warden defined the very terms of reference for the 1991 Desert Storm military strategy and thereby introduced a new approach to the conduct of war".

== Personal background ==
John A. Warden III was born in McKinney, Texas in 1943 and was the fourth in his family to pursue a military career. He completed a BS (National Security Affairs) at the Air Force Academy (1965) and an MA at Texas Tech University (1975), with his thesis focused exclusively on decision-making at the Grand Strategic level.

In 1965 (on his twenty-second birthday), he married his high school sweetheart, Marjorie "Margie" Ann Clarke, and on December 5, 1966, became the father of twins, Elizabeth Kathleen, and John Warden IV.

== Early military career ==
While still at the Air Force Academy, Warden grew concerned that air power would play a secondary role to the Army and briefly considered transferring to that service and enrolling at West Point.

He became aware of the work of the military theorist Major General J.F.C. Fuller through his book The Generalship of Alexander the Great (1960). General Fuller quickly became Warden's "intellectual mentor" and was instrumental in forming his lifelong interest in history and strategy, and what has come to be called the "science" of war.

In January 1968, Warden was a member of the 334th Fighter Squadron, flying the F4 Phantom II, when he was first deployed overseas to South Korea in response to the Pueblo incident.{CN}

In 1969, then a captain, Warden volunteered for duty in the Republic of Vietnam. His assignment was to fly the OV-10 Bronco as a Forward Air Controller. Warden participated in 266 combat missions at his tour's end. On several occasions, his aircraft by enemy fire was damaged once so seriously the North American Aviation newsletter reported in 1969 that it was the most seriously damaged OV-10 that had managed to land safely.

Like many other young officers who came of age during that conflict, Warden was very much affected by the sometimes conflicting rules of engagement and the lack of an overarching strategy to guide the conduct of that war. That experience was the foundation for his emerging theories on the use of air power and the importance of strategy.

Just as it did for another young officer, Colin Powell, as enunciated in the "Powell Doctrine", Vietnam taught Warden some important lessons about warfare: the need for a consistent strategic approach; overwhelming force; clear objectives; an exit strategy; and integration of the political and military dimensions. For Warden, good tactics simply could not overcome a flawed strategy.

== The Pentagon ==
In August 1975 Major Warden was at the Pentagon in the Directorate of Plans, assigned duties in the Middle East Section, his increasing familiarity with that region of the world would culminate in his contributions to the conduct of the First Gulf War.

It was also at this point in his career that he began to attract attention from senior officers and members of the Intelligence Community, both for his ability to think strategically and conceptually, and for his ideas about force structure, concepts, and doctrine, that normally did not interest fighter pilots.

Warden had also begun to become something of a lightning rod, in that he was not afraid to forcefully express his views, even to senior officers, and was somewhat impatient with those who disagreed with him, as well as with the structure and the chain of command. Warden was at this point, and would remain throughout his career, the "quintessential air power advocate", and a very controversial figure.

Warden has been compared to famed aviator Billy Mitchell: "a thinker on a grand scale; a rebel who constantly sought ways to improve himself and his organization without having the patience to explain his reasoning or seek consensus; a revolutionary who refused to take political and personal sensitivities into account in his eagerness to change things fast, and a gentleman of unfailing integrity".

== Mid-career ==
As a Lieutenant Colonel, Warden began a series of operational assignments which were a necessary requirement for the command track, and an opportunity to reach General Officer status. Warden's operational assignments:

- Eglin Air Force Base: Director of Wing Operations
- Moody Air Force Base: Deputy Commander for Operations
- Decimomannu Air Force Base: Commander of Detachment Four (4)
- Thirty-Sixth Tactical Fighter Wing: Wing Commander

Warden was promoted to Colonel at the age of thirty nine and selected for the National War College. Colonel Warden's first book, The Air Campaign: Planning for Combat was published from his National War College research in 1988. He defined in it his theories of airpower. Many of the concepts in the book became the framework for the air campaign in the First Gulf War, and formed the basis for what is now known as the Prometheus Strategic Planning System. The Air Campaign further cemented Warden's reputation as a brilliant, but controversial strategist. In this complex book, he focused on the concept of air power as a determinant factor in modern warfare. He directly challenged the prevailing doctrine entitled AirLand Battle, which held that air power must always play a subordinate role to ground operations, and was not strategic in and of itself. Air Force historian Richard P. Hallion noted, "the book had a profound effect on the American defense establishment".

== Back at the Pentagon ==
In 1989, after a tour of duty as Wing Commander of the Thirty-Sixth Tactical Fighter Wing in Bitburg, Germany, Colonel Warden was again assigned to the Pentagon. He was placed in charge of the Directorate of Warfighting Concepts, where he continued to conceive, develop, and promote his ideas surrounding air power, particularly that land-based air power now constituted the dominant form of national presence and power projection; as captured in the phrase he coined; "Global Reach – Global Power"

Colonel Warden was acknowledged as a "catalyst and provocateur" by Air Force Secretary Donald Rice and Lieutenant General Michael Dugan during the significant intellectual and conceptual changes undertaken by the U.S. Air Force in the period 1988–90.

== Checkmate and the First Gulf War ==
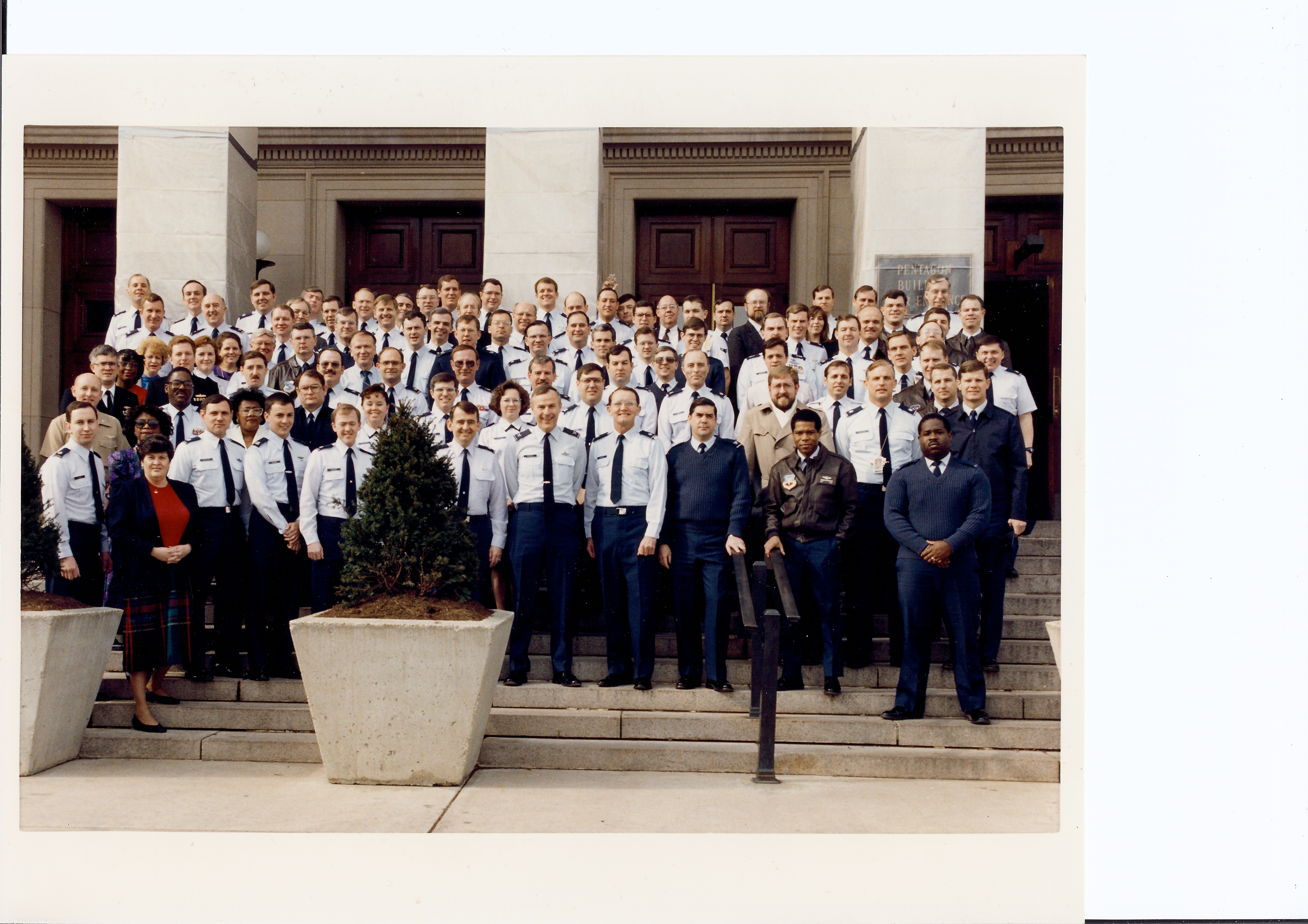
John Warden and his Checkmate Planning Group, Pentagon, March 1991

Warden was widely acknowledged at the time to be the Pentagon's premier authority on air power strategy. Warden instructed Checkmate, which had merged with the Mission Area Analysis Division to become the Force Assessment Division (XOXWF) under his command, to look beyond traditional AirLand Battle doctrine and to focus on potential trouble spots, paying special attention to the Persian Gulf.

Sarah Baxter of the London Sunday Times said of Checkmate:

Project Checkmate was formed in 1970s to counter Soviet threats, but fell into disuse in 1980s. It was revived under Colonel John Warden and was responsible for drawing up plans for the crushing air blitz against Saddam Hussein at the opening of the first Gulf War in 1991.

When Iraq invaded Kuwait in 1990, Saddam Hussein's move took nearly everyone by surprise. General Norman Schwarzkopf, who was in charge of the CENTCOM (Central Command) area telephoned the Pentagon on August 8 and asked that the Air Force "put planners to work on a strategic bombing campaign aimed at Iraq's military, which would provide the retaliatory options we needed." Schwarzkopf needed two things: a way to defend Saudi Arabia, and the ability to strike Iraq if Saddam made a crazy move.

The model that came to mind was Operation El Dorado Canyon, the 1986 American air raid on Libya, in which USAF and Navy aircraft struck Libyan sites in retaliation for Muammar Qaddafi's terrorism. The Commander-in-Chief (CINC) needed something like the Libya raid, on a larger scale".

The planning to liberate Kuwait originated with Warden's group of air power advocates in the Air Staff. Warden and his team at Checkmate had reacted quickly to the task laid out by Generals Powell and Schwarzkopf, and had laid out a strategic and offense-oriented plan, that, while it underwent vigorous review and revision, put the initiative in coalition hands and resulted in the overwhelming victory of Desert Storm. Colin Powell stated, "His original concept remained at the heart of the Desert Storm Air Campaign"

Norman Schwarzkopf declared that "together we mapped out the strategic concept that ultimately led to our country's great victory in Desert Storm". Warden's "Five Rings Model" was a central element in the presentation to General Schwarzkopf of the general outline for the Air Campaign in late August, 1990.

David Halberstam asserted in War in a Time of Peace: Bush, Clinton, and the Generals (2002):

...if one of the news magazines had wanted to run on its cover the photograph of the man who had played the most critical role in achieving victory, it might well have chosen Warden instead of Powell or Schwarzkopf.

Warden's view of the enemy as a 'system' and of the primary importance of the command, control, and communications apparatus within that system, combined with his belief in bombing for functional disruption, strategic paralysis, and systemic effect, was at the heart of the Instant Thunder air campaign in the first Gulf War, and has played an important role in changing the United States view of Warfighting at both the strategic and operational levels.

His theories on effects-based planning, and his radical ideas about air power's purposes and applications, have made him probably the most influential air power theorist since the Second World War.

== Late career ==
Special Assistant to the Vice President

In 1991, at the recommendation of the Secretary of the Air Force, Donald B. Rice, Colonel Warden became the Special Assistant for Policy Studies and National Security Affairs to the Vice President of the United States, Dan Quayle. Warden represented the Office of the Vice President on numerous interagency policy coordinating committees and focused on American productivity and competitiveness. Quayle credited Warden with having finalized the Manufacturing Technology Initiative, a plan announced in 1992 that provided for American company representatives to study Japanese manufacturing processes in Japan. a bilateral agreement that enabled American enterprises to become increasingly familiar with Japanese production technology. Quayle also credited Warden with introducing senior government officials to the Six Sigma concept of business management and quality control, and with strengthening National Security through the enhancement of industrial competitiveness.

Commandant of the Air Command and Staff College (ACSC)

As Commandant of the ACSC for three years, Colonel Warden completely changed the entire structure and curriculum from a focus on the tactics and techniques of war, to a focus on the real objectives of war. During his time in command of the college, he intended to make it a world class educational institution for mid-career officers. Warden and his team transformed what had been an isolated academic institution into one that attracted the notice of the Pentagon, the Department of Defense, and various research communities.

During his tenure, the school received several official honors, such as the General Muir S. Fairchild Educational Achievement Award in 1994 and 1995. Colonel Warden's impact will be felt for years to come as the more than eighteen hundred Majors who graduated during his time as Commandant, some of whom have already reached General Officer rank, continue their careers in the Air Force.

John Warden retired from the Air Force in June 1995, and shortly thereafter started his own consulting company to pursue the application of strategy in the business world. He co-authored, with Leland A. Russell, Winning in FastTime, in which he encapsulates his ideas and theory about strategy and effects-based planning into a process they call "Prometheus".

== Legacy ==
The Gulf War Air Power Survey documents how Warden managed to "define the debate on the military strategy for 1991 through his presentations to Generals Powell and Schwarzkopf".

The U.S. Air Force History Office, after extensive research, concludes that Warden introduced a new approach to the conduct of war; an air- and leadership-centric paradigm diametrically opposed to the AirLand Battle doctrine that relegated air power to a supporting role. Scholars such as Robert A. Pape, Edward N. Luttwak, Alan Stephens, Richard P. Hallion, and Phillip S. Meilinger all agree that Warden is one of the most influential strategists since the Second World War.

The historian David R. Mets wonders in The Air Campaign: John Warden and the Classical Airpower Theorists whether John Warden belongs in the pantheon of such great airpower thinkers as Giulio Douhet; Hugh Trenchard; and Billy Mitchell.

Federation Starship John A. Warden was named after the Colonel in Starship Troopers: Invasion.

== Books and articles by John Warden ==
- Warden, John A. III (1988), The Air Campaign: Planning for Combat, Washington, D.C.: National Defense University Press, ISBN 978-1-58348-100-4
- Warden, John A. III (September 1995), "Chapter 4: Air theory for the 21st century", Battlefield of the Future: 21st Century Warfare Issues, United States Air Force, archived from the originalin Air and Space Power Journal on July 4, 2011
- Warden, John A. III (1995), "Enemy as a System", Airpower Journal, Spring (9): 40–55
- Warden, John A. III (1995), "The Gulf War: How WWII Lessons Influenced Planning and Execution in From Total War to Total Victory", Catigny Military History Series, March
- Warden, John A. III (1995), "Success in Modern War: A Response to Robert Pape's Bombing to Win", Security Studies, Winter (9): 87–93
- Warden, John A. III (1999), "The New American Security Force", Airpower Journal, Fall (13)
- Warden, John A. III (2002), Winning in FastTime: Harness the Competitive Advantage of Prometheus in Business and Life, Montgomery, Alabama: Venturist Publishing, ISBN 978-0-9711591-4-3
- Warden, John A. III (2008), Strategic Thinking and Planning: A Concept Summary of Strategy and the Prometheus Process, Montgomery, Alabama: Venturist Publishing, ISBN 978-0-9817946-0-0
- Warden, John A. III (2008), The CEO and Leader's Handbook: Introducing the Prometheus Process Strategic Planning Methodology, Montgomery, Alabama: Venturist Publishing, ISBN 978-0-9817946-1-7
- Warden, John A. III; Cline, Mike (2008), The Guide to Strategic Planning and Execution using the Prometheus Process, Montgomery, Alabama: Venturist Publishing, ISBN 978-0-9817946-2-4

== See also ==
- Warden's Five Rings
