= James Warden =

James Warden may refer to:

- James Warden (Royal Navy officer) (1736–1792), British officer who died in a duel
- James Warden (politician) (1820–1904), Australian politician
- James Warden (footballer), Scottish footballer
- Jim Warden, ice hockey player

== See also ==
- James Warden Stansfield (1906–1991), British barrister and judge
