= Operation Instant Thunder =

Name given to a planned air strike by the United States

Coordinates: 33.460°N 44.522°E

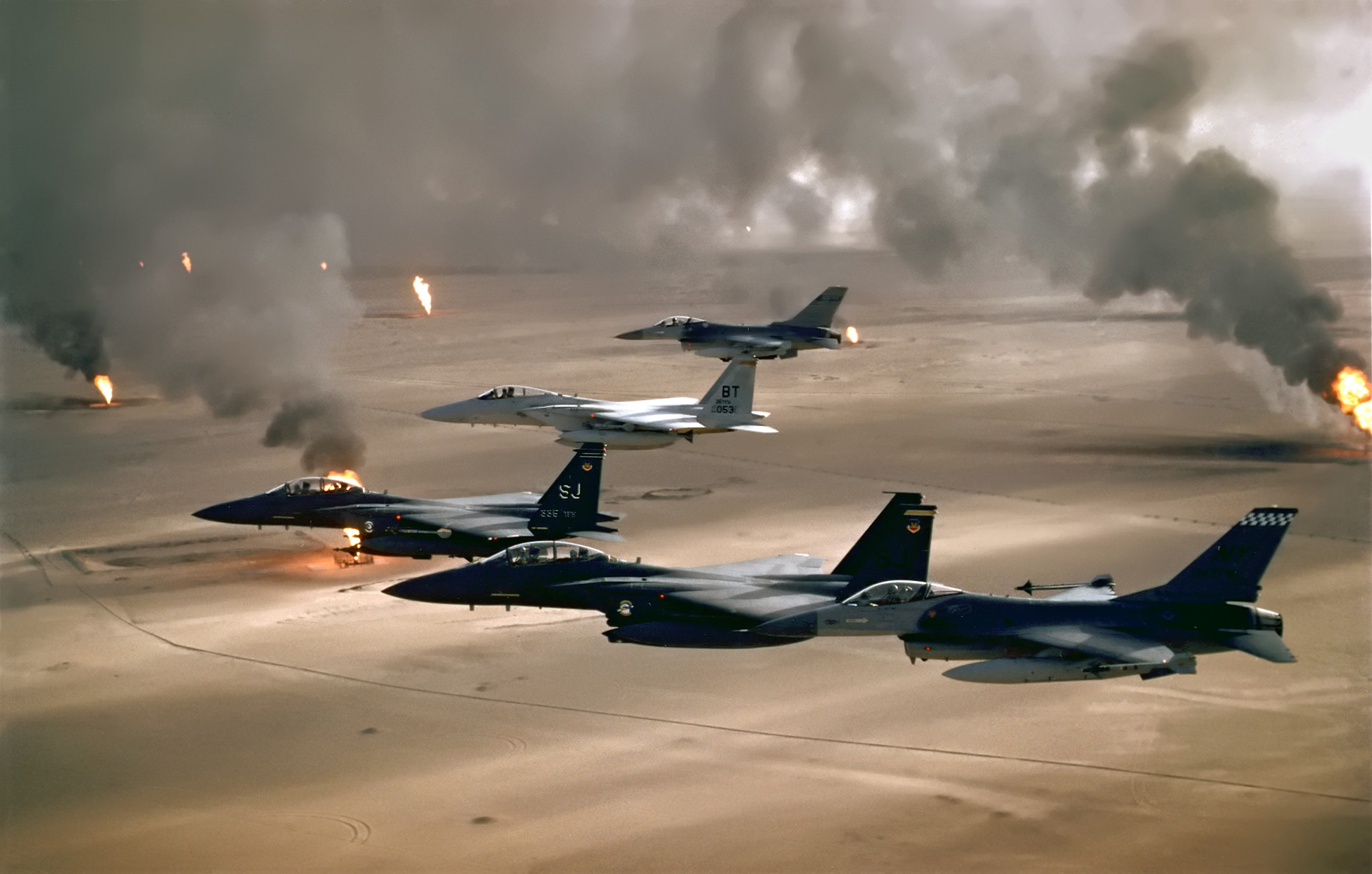
United States Air Force planes flying over burning Kuwaiti oil wells

Operation Instant Thunder was the preliminary name given to a planned air strike by the United States during the Gulf War. it was planned to be an overwhelming Aerial Strike which would devastate the Iraqi military with a minimum loss of civilian as well as American life.

The planning of the operation made use of Warden's Five Rings intellectual model, which prioritized different aspects of a nation's war machine into a hierarchy of concentric circles. The leadership was placed as a top priority, saying that this would "decapitate" the enemy. The name is a nod to Operation Rolling Thunder, a joint American-South Vietnamese bombing campaign in the Vietnam War.

== Phase one ==
The plan called for three separate phases. The shortest of these was the first phase, which would use "defense suppression" to establish control of the air space above Iraq and Kuwait. This was to be accomplished by eliminating enemy radar, cutting off runways used by the Iraqi military and neutralizing any surface-to-air missile batteries.

This first phase of the operation would include the bombing of selected military command posts and suspected locations of chemical weapons. 84 targets were initially identified, with this number was later increased.

== Phase two ==
The second phase would attempt to incapacitate the Iraqi military, as well as the country's infrastructure. This would include the bombing of weapon depots, refineries and other locations critical to the success of the military. These strikes would cripple the Iraqi military by rendering Iraq unable to manufacture or repair weaponry.

Attention would then turn to disabling the civil infrastructure of Iraq, by destroying power plants, telephone lines and water treatment plants.

== Phase three ==
The third phase would have seen the Americans engage the Iraqis in direct combat. Weakened by the initial stages, it was predicted that the Iraqi military would not be able to muster much resistance.

== Implementation ==
Operation Instant Thunder planning started August 5, 1990. By the time fighting began on January 17, 1991, the three phases were consolidated into Operation Desert Storm, as chairman of the Joint Chiefs of Staff Colin Powell was reluctant to support any action which did not include a ground offensive.

The tactics used by the American military during the operation served as a model for future conflicts in which the United States was involved.

== Notes ==
- Luttwak, Edward N. Strategy: The Logic of War and Peace Harvard University Press (2001) ISBN 0-674-00703-4
