= Francis Bird (architect) =

Francis Bird (14 November 1845 – 24 May 1937) was a businessman and architect in Western Australia. Bird was born in Hyde Park in London, the third son of Mr and Mrs George Bird of Pinner Hall, Middlesex.

After being articled to architects in England, he left the country and arrived in Fremantle in 1869 aboard the Bridgetown. Once settled he set up a business partnership with timber merchant Benjamin Mason which they named Mason, Bird and Co.

By 1871 Bird had secured a timber concession over 100,000 acres (40,469 ha) in the Canning District from the British Government. Mason, Bird, & Co proposed building a rail line from Fremantle to a point 25 miles away in the area of Bird's timber concession.

In 1877 he relinquished his milling interests and settled in Perth to practice as an architect. Eventually appointed as Chief Government Architect in 1883 he remained in the position until 1884. By 1889 he moved to Albany and took up residence at Old Farm, Strawberry Hill where he remained for the rest of his life. Bird stood unsuccessfully for the seat of Albany at the 1890 general election, losing by a large margin to Lancel de Hamel.
