= Eliza Grey =

British wife of Premier of New Zealand (1822-1898)

Lady Grey
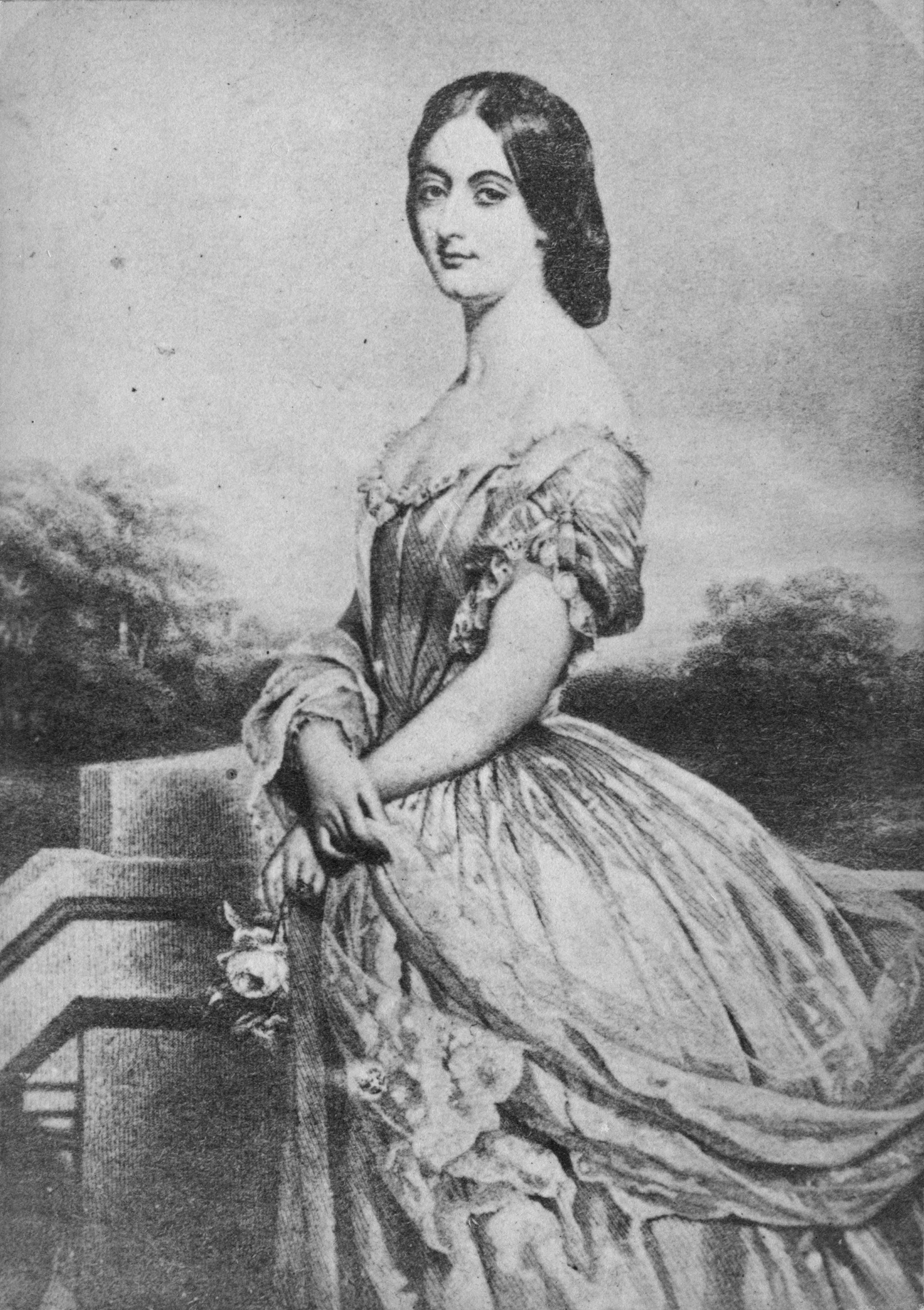
- Lady Grey portrait by William Gush (c. 1854)

Spouse of the Premier of New Zealand
- In role 13 October 1877 – 8 October 1879
- Premier: Sir George Grey
- Preceded by: Ann Elizabeth Atkinson
- Succeeded by: Rose Anne Hall

Personal details
- Born: Elizabeth Lucy Spencer; 17 December 1822 Lyme Regis, Dorset
- Died: 4 September 1898 (aged 75) Christchurch, Hampshire
- Spouse: Sir George Grey (m. 1839; sep. 1854)
- Children: 1; died in infancy
- Parents: Sir Richard Spencer (father); Ann Liddon (mother)

Eliza Lucy Grey, Lady Grey (née Elizabeth Lucy Spencer; 17 December 1822 – 4 September 1898), was the daughter of British Royal Navy officer Captain Sir Richard Spencer and Ann, Lady Spencer. She was the wife of Sir George Grey.

== Early life ==
Elizabeth Lucy Spencer was born 17 December 1822 near the Cobb in Lyme Regis, Dorset, England.

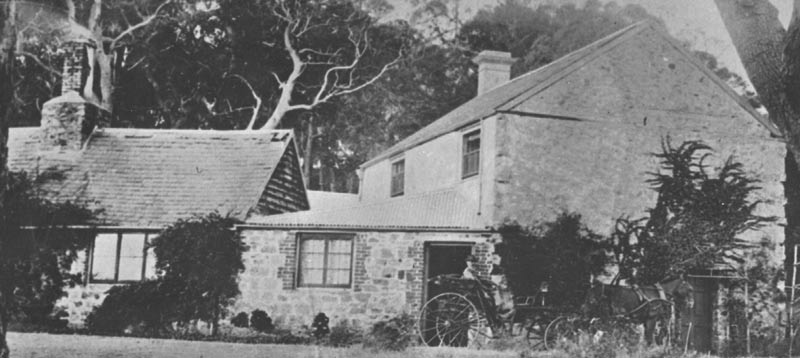
Strawberry Hill Farm, Albany

In 1833, her father was knighted and appointed Government Resident at Albany, Western Australia on the recommendation of Sir James Stirling. On the 12th of May 1833, the Spencer family departed Plymouth upon the storeship HMS Buffalo, loaded with plants, livestock, farm implements, stores and servants. They reached Western Australia in September of that year.

Her father purchased the Government Farm (known as Strawberry Hill Farm), and she resided there with her parents, seven brothers and two sisters. They lived in a pise cottage until, in 1836, the current two-storey stone house was built adjoining the older home.

When her father became ill, Eliza and her sister Augusta helped with clerical work. Richard Spencer died on July 24, 1839. Later that year on 16 October 1839, Eliza's brother Horatio Spencer, along with another teenage boy, were killed by a falling tree.

== Marriage ==
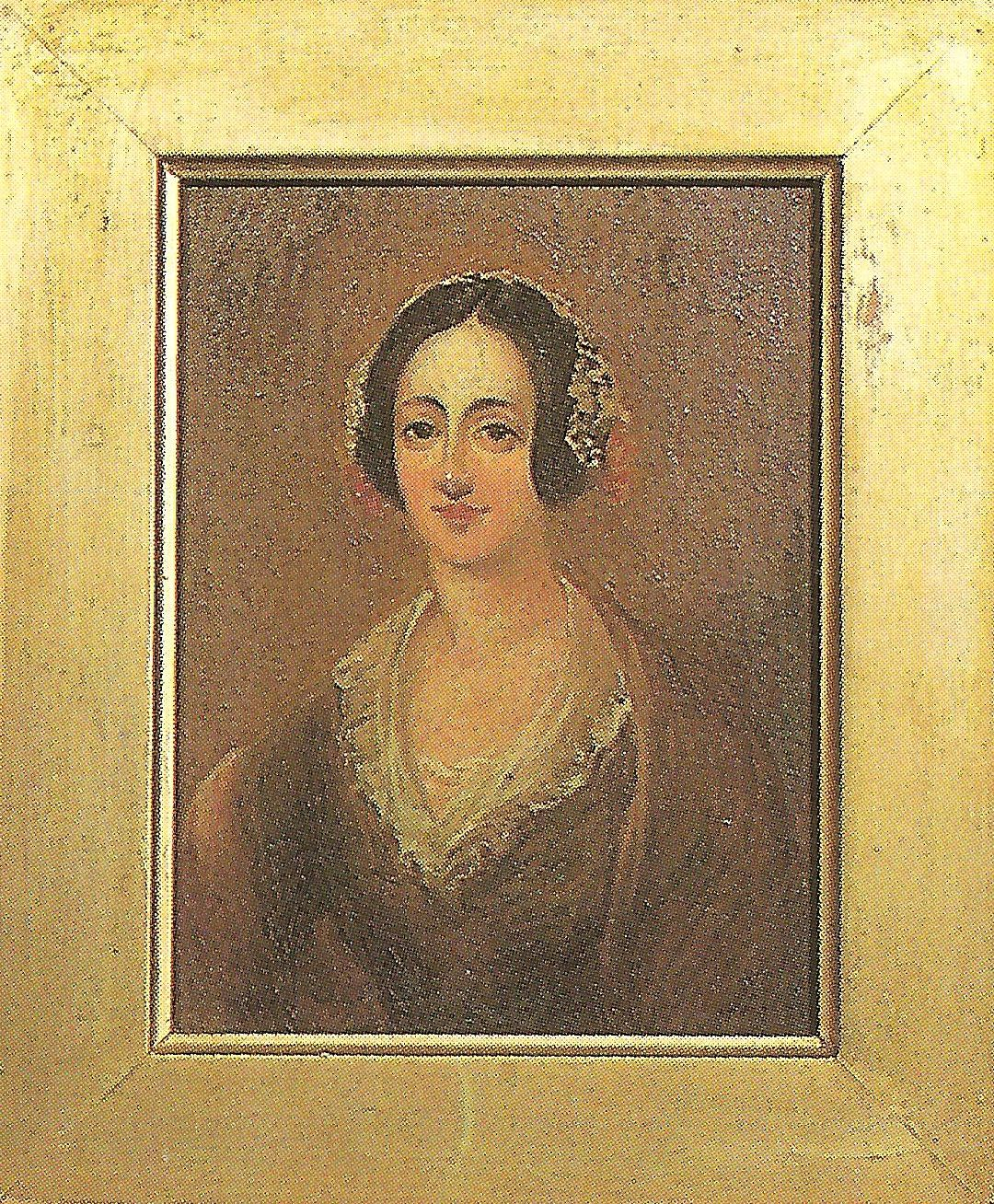
A portrait painting of Lady Grey at Mansion House, Kawau Island.

George Grey (then, Lieutenant) was a visiting magistrate in Albany when he met Eliza, at Strawberry Hill Farm. George and Eliza married on 2 November 1839 at the farm after a brief two month courtship. She was fifteen and he was twenty-seven.

On 5 March 1840, they journeyed upon the Caledonia to England. Soon after they departed, Eliza's brother Seymour, who had travelled to farewell the couple out of Princess Royal harbour was caught in an accident. An issue occurred with the vessel's mast and it capsized, throwing everyone overboard. The harbour master and Seymour were the only two that drowned.

In 1841, on board the Lord Glenelg, they returned to Australia when George Grey was appointed the third Governor of South Australia, a position he held until 1845. During the voyage, on 16 February, Eliza gave birth to a boy, who was named George, after his father. On 25 July 1841, the child died after only five months. It has widely noted that George blamed Eliza for his death, claiming their child was neglected. It is also noted that these events put significant strain on their marriage and saw them both grow apart and away from social life of the time.

During her time in South Australia, Eliza sent over 300 specimens of plants to the British Museum. In correspondence with the museum's, John Edward Gray, John Gould, geologist Charles Lyell and Professor Richard Owen, George Grey explained that Eliza kept a male and female honey possum, as pets. Subsequently, John Gray named the Tarsipes spenserae after Eliza's maiden name, Spencer. These findings were published by the Society on 8 March 1842. The scientific name was accepted for nearly 150 years and it wasn't until post-1970 that an earlier claim by Gervais & Verreaux (albeit by only 5 days) was recognised.

After some time in South Australia, in 1845 Eliza travelled with George to New Zealand onboard the Elphinstone where he was Governor of New Zealand till 1853. In 1848 Grey was created a Knight Commander of the Order of the Bath, making Eliza 'Lady' Grey.

During her time in New Zealand it was noted that Eliza was often alone and miserable in Government House, as George was working all over New Zealand.

Grey amassed a sizeable collection of artefacts in Australia and New Zealand. These, along with copious research notes he had made about the indigenous cultures of both lands, were intended as the basis for his later published works. When not occupied with government work involving bureaucrats or military officials Grey was sequestered with local Maori, recording their myths and songs and learning their language. Eliza's attitude to Grey's literary and anthropological interests is unknown.

In 1848 Government House in Auckland suffered a massive fire and the Greys lost many of their possessions; furniture, linen, china & silver, brought out from England and very difficult to replace in such a small isolated colony. Also destroyed were Grey's considerable collection of artefacts and manuscripts.

This undoubtedly had a traumatic effect on Grey, who threw himself into his work. He spent the next few years travelling widely throughout New Zealand inspecting the new Colony and ascertaining the exact political situation at a time when tensions were increasing between the settlers and the Maori. He slowly replaced a lot of the destroyed New Zealand material in his collections.

Eliza was left by herself in Auckland in the replacement Government House for months on end, which may have contributed to the deterioration of their relationship. Left to her own devices, Eliza enjoyed herself as the most important female in Auckland society and her apparent happiness in his absence may well have annoyed Grey, who was known to have a fiery temper and possibly a jealous streak. Eliza's bubbly personality, which may have attracted George to her in Albany, might have concerned him now. The possibility of flirtatious behaviour being misconstrued as infidelity on her part may have created more stress for him.

In 1854, the Greys arrived in the Cape where Sir George Grey had been posted as Governor of the Cape Colony. Returning to the Cape following a visit to England in 1860, there was an incident and the marriage hit stormy waters. This took place at Rio de Janeiro (which seems an unusually indirect route from England to South Africa). George accused Eliza of flirting with the ship's captain, Admiral Henry Keppel. The boat was quickly turned around and the disgraced Eliza was left ashore at Rio de Janeiro. George continued his voyage back to Cape Town alone.

== Later life ==
George Grey and his wife Eliza had an unhappy marriage; it seems plain that they were simply ill-suited to each other. Initially attracted by her beauty and bubbly personality, Grey was probably the sort of man who actually needed another sort of person as his life partner. It is likely he assumed that his pretty, vivacious bride would naturally transform into a demure, sensible mother who would take an intelligent interest in his intellectual pursuits. He (like the Duke of Wellington whose marriage failed for very similar reasons) was simply unprepared for the reality that his wife's personality and youth was not going to live up to his high expectations. That she was mere 16 to his 27 at the time of marriage and that he is said to have blamed her for the death of their only child cannot be overlooked as a probable source of misery for Eliza. As divorce was not an option at the time they may have ended up feeling trapped in a loveless (and in this case childless) marriage.

Infidelity may have been a particularly sore point for him; Grey's father died before he was born and there were rumours that Lieutenant-Colonel George Grey was not actually his parent. Grey's meteoric rise through the colonial service contributed to the rumours that his real father was in fact Prince Edward, Duke of Kent and Strathearn (making him Queen Victoria's half-sibling) or one of the other Royal Dukes, explaining the favouritism shown to him by Victoria. Untrue as this was, Grey was aware of the rumours and thus probably hypersensitive to any behaviour by Eliza that might be misconstrued as infidelity. Eliza was very possibly innocent of any real indiscretion, but it is now impossible to know the truth. He was noted for never mentioning her name for the period of their separation, a fact which rather speaks to his inflexible nature.

The Greys were estranged for 36 years; he in New Zealand, she in England – on opposite sides of the world. Grey continued his political career in New Zealand, and remarkably, transitioned from the role of Governor to that of Premier, continuing to play a pivotal role in the formation of the country. Eliza by contrast lived very quietly and largely resided away from London. This seems in contrast to her twenty years of married life where she enjoyed being at the centre of lively and fashionable social events. She converted to the Roman Catholic Church and it was said she became very religious in her later years, devoting much time and energy to charitable works.

In 1894, Grey returned to England and was made a Privy Councilor to the Queen. The Greys were reconciled, it has been said, only through the personal intervention of Queen Victoria and the Gladstones, only a year before they both died in 1898. George Grey died on 19 September in London, having been nursed by Eliza during his last illness which lasted for 18 months. Eliza, however, pre-deceased him by 14 days. She was 75 years old.

Following an attack of influenza Eliza suffered

a violent affection of the nerves of the left leg, to which doctors give the name of "phlegmasia." Three months ago Lady Grey went to Bournemouth for change of air, but apparently this did not suit her, for she almost immediately became worse, and steadily continued to get weaker until twelve days ago, when she experienced the paralytic stroke which so soon proved fatal.

Separated in death as in life, Eliza's was buried at Bournemouth, Grey (too ill to accompany her to Bournemouth or to attend her funeral) received a state funeral and was interred in St Paul's Cathedral.

Her obituary in part read:

During the eventful career of her husband she was his earnest and discreet helpmate. She took an interest in all that he did, and especially did all she could for the native races of New Zealand and South Africa. She was a capital walker, and could even keep pace with Bishop Selwyn—no ordinary feat. She was a devout Churchwoman. She was well au courant with currant [sic] literature, was a splendid hostess, and had a keen insight into character.

== See also ==
- Lady Grey, Eastern Cape, a village in South Africa named in honour of Eliza
