= Warden Pass =

Warden Pass (80°28′S 28°20′W) is a snow pass at about 1,000 m trending east–west between the northwest side of Fuchs Dome and Flat Top in the Shackleton Range. The area was surveyed by Commonwealth Trans-Antarctic Expedition in 1957. Named by the United Kingdom Antarctic Place-Names Committee (UK-APC) after Michael A. Warden, British Antarctic Survey (BAS) general assistant, Halley Station, 1970–72, who worked in the area.

Mike Warden writes: In 1970, after a month traveling through the Shackleton Mountain range, the two sledge parties arranged to rendez vous back at their airdrop depot on the Slessor Glacier on Christmas Day. But delayed by bad weather, Peter Clarkson, geologist, and Mike "Muff" Warden, doggyman, said that "come hell or high water" we would get back to the depot on New Year's Eve. A promise we almost regretted making.

On New Year's Eve, we started sledging at 11.15 hours. The sun was high in the sky so the surfaces were lousy - sticky and soft - making it very heavy work for the two dog teams. Progress was very slow. Luckily the up hills were gentle, the down hills fun. We took a short cut over a pass, now named Warden Pass. At 20.00 hours, we reached the top of the pass and could see the tent and the other team in the distance at the depot. We sledged down a long steep slope onto the Slessor Glacier. We crawled the last section up the glacier on better surfaces. Our two dog teams were exhausted and didn't even have a final burst of energy when they got sight of the depot which we eventually reached at 22.45 hours. In my journal I wrote "Both teams were shagged. Eleven and a half hours of traveling, what a flog. Hell or high water we said, and so it was. An epic finish to 1970. 24.8 miles: dogs treated to 2 bars of Nutrican each for the fourth consecutive night, and they deserved it, bless them."

This was the third consecutive season, and the last, that dog teams were used in the Shackleton Mountains. A few years later the last dogs were removed from Antarctica following an international agreement that all non indigenous animals should be removed from the Continent. What is indigenous? Most of our dogs were at least the third generation that had been bred and born on the continent. The removal of dogs from the continent brought an end to an era of truly the most reliable and exhilarating forms of transport, dog sledging. The contribution dogs made to the exploration of the continent has been marked by a statue of a husky placed outside the headquarters of the British Antarctic Survey at Cambridge, UK.

Mike Warden, 15 June 2013
