= Acacia cummingiana =

Conservation status
- Priority Three — Poorly Known Taxa (DEC)

Scientific classification
- Kingdom: Plantae
- Clade: Tracheophytes
- Clade: Angiosperms
- Clade: Eudicots
- Clade: Rosids
- Order: Fabales
- Family: Fabaceae
- Subfamily: Caesalpinioideae
- Clade: Mimosoid clade
- Genus: Acacia
- Species: A. cummingiana

Binomial name
- Acacia cummingiana Maslin
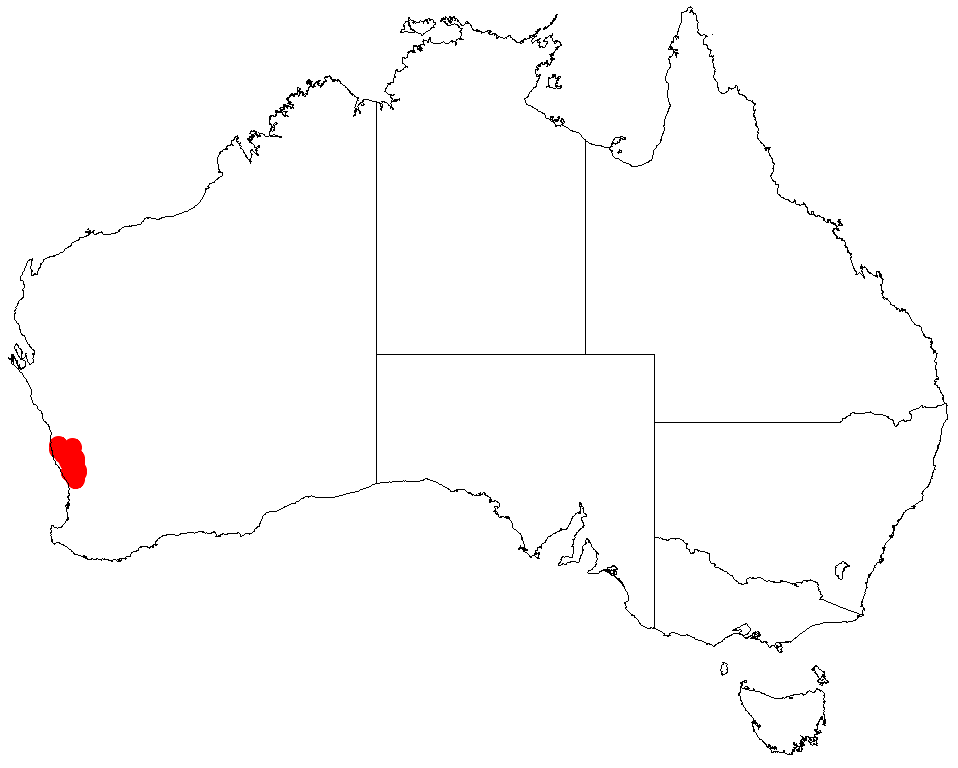
- Occurrence data from AVH

Synonyms
- Racosperma cummingianum (Maslin) Leslie PedleyPedley

Species of legume

Acacia cummingiana is a species of flowering plant in the family Fabaceae and is endemic to a small area in the south-west of Western Australia. It is a sprawling, straggly, rush-like shrub with striated branches, phyllodes reduced to thin, flattened scales, spherical heads of bright, light golden yellow flowers and shallowly curved, leathery to crusty pods.

== Description ==
Acacia cummingiana is a sprawling, straggly, rush-like shrub or subshrub, that typically grows to a height of 30–50 cm (12–20 in) and has terete, striated branches. Its phyllodes are reduced to continuous, thin, horizontally flattened, narrowly oblong to narrowly triangular scaled 1.5–4 mm (0.059–0.157 in) long. The flowers are borne in spherical heads in one or two scale axils, on a peduncle 4–15 mm (0.16–0.59 in) long. Each head is about 8 mm (0.31 in) in diameter when dry, and has 8 to 12 loosely arranged, bright light golden flowers. Flowering occurs from May to June, sometimes to August, and the pods are stalked, 40–70 mm (1.6–2.8 in) long and 8–10 mm (0.31–0.39 in) wide, shallowly curved and leathery to crusty. The seeds are oblong to elliptic, about 5.5 mm (0.22 in) long with a conical aril on the end.

== Taxonomy ==
Acacia cummingiana was first formally described in 1995 by Bruce Maslin in the journal Nuytsia from specimens collected north-east of Dandaragan in 1979. The specific epithet (cummingiana) honours Russell Cumming, in recognition of his contribution to the taxonomy of the genus Acacia.

== Distribution ==
This species of wattle is restricted to a small area between Watheroo National Park and Wannamal where it grows in sand or gravel in heath or low woodland in the Avon Wheatbelt, Geraldton Sandplains and Swan Coastal Plain bioregions of south-western Western Australia.

== Conservation status ==
Acacia cummingiana is listed as "Priority Three" by the Government of Western Australia, Department of Biodiversity, Conservation and Attractions, meaning that it is poorly known and known from only a few locations but is not under imminent threat.

== See also ==
- List of Acacia species
