= Warden's Five Rings =

Military strategy

Warden's Five Rings

Warden's Five Rings represent a theory of military strategic attack, based on five levels of system attributes. They are named in honor of Col. John A. Warden III, a former United States Air Force officer and theorist of air power.

The Five Rings include:

- Leadership
- Organic/System Essentials/Key Production
- Infrastructure
- Population
- Fielded Military Forces

Each level of system or "ring" was considered one of the enemy's centers of gravity. The idea behind Warden's five rings was to attack each of the rings to paralyze their forces, an objective also known as physical paralysis. To optimize a strike attack the attacker would engage as many rings as possible with special emphasis on taking out the center ring, which is the enemy's leadership. This would result in total physical paralysis.

Warden's theories on the application of air power in modern war have been criticized as little more than a reiteration of earlier strategic bombing concepts discredited by historical analysis of the Second World War and the Vietnam War, similar to the effect on the writings of Giulio Douhet. Warden differs from Douhet in assigning leadership the highest priority, where Douhet espoused attacking the morale of populations. This made Warden's theory more applicable for attacking developing and weaker regimes, while Douhet's theories were based on stronger nations engaged in large conventional wars as was the concern in interwar Europe. Dismissal of the theories has led some to mistakenly conclude that the theories have no application, thereby missing the application of air power as a modern means of accomplishing the Strategic Indirect of Sir B. H. Liddell Hart.

== See also ==
- Air Corps Tactical School
- Strategic bombing
