= USS Worden =

Four ships in the United States Navy have been named USS Worden for John Lorimer Worden.

- The first USS Worden (DD-16) was a Truxtun-class destroyer, commissioned in 1903 and decommissioned in 1919.
- The second USS Worden (DD-288) was a Clemson-class destroyer, commissioned in 1920 and decommissioned in 1930.
- The third USS Worden (DD-352) was a Farragut-class destroyer, commissioned in 1935 and wrecked in 1943.
- The fourth USS Worden (CG-18) was a Leahy-class cruiser, commissioned in 1963 and decommissioned in 1993.
