= John Warden (footballer) =

Australian rules footballer

Personal information
- Full name: John Warden
- Born: 25 August 1951 (age 75)
- Original team: Northern District
- Height: 185 cm (6 ft 1 in)
- Weight: 74 kg (163 lb)

Playing career^{1}
Years	Club	Games (Goals)
1971–1972	Carlton	11 (0)
- ^{1} Playing statistics correct to the end of 1972.

John Warden (born 25 August 1951) is a former Australian rules footballer who played with Carlton in the Victorian Football League (VFL).
