= Warden (given name) =

Warden is a masculine given name. Notable people with the name include:

- Warden Burgess (1899–1979), Canadian politician
- Warden Chilcott (1871–1942), British politician
- Warden Flood (1694–1764), Irish judge
- Warden Flood (1735–1797), Irish politician
- Ward Prentice (Warden Selby Prentice, 1886–1969), Australian rugby union and rugby league player and first-class cricketer
