= Richard Spencer (Royal Navy officer) =

Royal Navy captain

Captain Sir Richard Spencer CB KCH
- Born: 9 December 1779; Southwark, London
- Died: 24 July 1839 (aged 59); Strawberry Hill, Mira Mar, Albany, Western Australia
- Spouse: Ann Warden Liddon (m. 1812)
- Children: 10, including Eliza
- Military career
- Allegiance: United Kingdom
- Branch: Royal Navy
- Service years: 1793–1817
- Rank: Captain
- Commands: HMS Crafty; HMS Samarang; HMS Blanche; HMS Eurydice; HMS Erne
- Conflicts: French Revolutionary Wars; Glorious First of June; Battle of Groix; Egypt campaign; Battle of Abukir; Battle of Alexandria; Napoleonic Wars; Invasion of Naples; Battle of Maida; Invasion of the Spice Islands
- Other work: Government Resident of Albany, Western Australia

Captain Sir Richard Spencer CB KCH (9 December 1779 – 24 July 1839) was a Royal Navy officer. He served in a number of battles, particularly against the French. In 1833 he was appointed Government Resident at King George's Sound, now Albany, Western Australia. He was born in Southwark, London, and died at Strawberry Hill Government Farm, Mira Mar in Albany, Western Australia.

== Naval career ==
Richard Spencer was the son of Richard Spencer, a London merchant. Spencer joined the ship's complement of the 38-gun frigate HMS Arethusa, in 1793, as captain's servant. He joined the 74-gun HMS Leviathan in 1794. He took part in the 4th Battle of Ushant, also known as the Glorious First of June, in 1794. He transferred to HMS Sans Pareil after she was captured in the battle. He was wounded in action on 23 June.

Spencer was appointed a midshipman in 1795 and moved to HMS Hornet, a 16-gun sloop, under Robert Larkan. He went with Larkan to the latter's new command, the 20-gun HMS Camilla, in September 1797.

In 1799, Spencer was promoted to the rank of lieutenant. He was commissioned into HMS Queen Charlotte, a 100-gun ship of the line. However, she blew up in an accident before he could join her. He joined the 80-gun Guillaume Tell, one of the few French ships to escape Nelson at the Battle of the Nile. She had, however, subsequently been captured. She was then renamed HMS Malta. He then joined the sloop HMS Cameleon, as lieutenant to the captain. This vessel supported the campaign to oust Napoleon's troops from Egypt.

Spencer was captured in Genoa in 1803, having been put ashore after hostilities had again broken out after the Treaty of Amiens. He escaped in the Danish vessel Enighiden and was rescued by HMS Phoebe. From here, he was transferred to HMS Victory, Nelson's flagship in the Mediterranean. He gave Nelson what information he had gleaned from his stay in Genoa.

Nelson appointed him to command the captured French 12-gun privateer schooner Renard; her name was changed to HMS Crafty. He was injured by an oar on board Crafty's jolly boat, which may have left a permanent mark on his health. He did not take part in the Battle of Trafalgar but he had lost a useful friend in Nelson. In 1806, he captured vessels running sulphur from Sicily to Toulon, France, for making gunpowder. He took part in the Battle of Maida, in which his vessel harassed the retreating French army. (Note: The Battle of Maida gave rise to the name Maida Vale, a suburb of London.) By successful diplomacy, he obtained the release of Christian slaves from the Dey of Algiers. He personally saved his ship from accidental destruction by the much larger HMS Eagle, in Valletta harbour. He had to surrender his ship to three Spanish privateers, in 1807. He was later cleared by court martial for the loss of Crafty, but was reprimanded for having lost contact with HMS Confounder, with which he had been in company, and for staying too long at anchor in the harbour where the Spanish found him.

He next was involved in action against the Dutch, in the East Indies. He was promoted to Commander on 8 April 1808 and given command of Samarang, in which he participated the Spice Islands campaign that led to the capture of Amboyna and captured Pulo Ay. He was made post captain on 25 July 1810 and then on 18 August took command of HMS Blanche. Prize money acquired during his successful career enabled him and his family to settle down after the end of hostilities in 1815. He retired from the Navy in 1817.

== Marriage ==
While in the evening of his Royal Navy career, he married Ann Warden Liddon, of Charmouth, near Lyme Regis in Dorset, England. Their first son, Richard, was born in Charmouth in 1814 but died in Malta in 1815. They were to have 12 children.

== Lyme Regis ==
He bought a house in Lyme Regis, in 1817. This was situated on the Exeter road, overlooking the Cobb harbour. After the Great Storm of 1824, no doubt stimulated by fears for the safety of shipping on that treacherous coast, he was engaged in pioneering ideas for a buoyant and self-righting 'lifeboat'. This was an adapted pilot boat, with copper buoyancy tanks fitted.

== Knighthood and Australia ==
Richard Spencer followed news of the colonization of Australia with interest. He determined to emigrate for the sake of the future of his several children. He was knighted in 1833 (Companion of the Order of the Bath 1815 and Knight of the Royal Guelphic Order 1833). This was not a government nomination but was in the personal gift of King William IV. He was appointed Government Resident of the settlement at King George's Sound, now Albany, Western Australia, in 1833. Spencer, together with 21 members of his family and servants, emigrated to Australia arriving at King George's Sound in September 1833 with merino sheep, cattle, horses other livestock along with plants, fruit-tree cuttings and seeds.

In his time in Australia, he pioneered farming methods suitable to that difficult terrain and climate. Spencer died at his residence on 24 July 1839. His two oldest living sons died in tragic accidents shortly after their father's death.

== Family ==
Sir Richard Spencer (9 December 1779 – 24 July 1839) married Ann Warden Liddon (1795 – 19 July 1855). Their family included:

- Hugh Seymour Spencer (13 May 1815 – 5 March 1840) drowned along with Princess Royal harbourmaster John Lawrence Morley as the result of a boating accident.
- Mary Ann (Marianne?) Spencer (c. 1816 – 24 August 1886) married Arthur Trimmer on 18 April 1836
- Edward May Spencer (c. 1819 – 4 September 1869) committed suicide by gunshot
- Augusta Spencer (10 May 1821 – 14 November 1871) married George Edward Egerton-Warburton (25 March 1819 – 20 March 1889) on 23 November 1842 in Albany. George was a brother of Peter Egerton-Warburton.
- Elizabeth Lucy "Eliza" Spencer (1823 – 4 September 1898) married Sir George Grey on 2 November 1839
- Horatio William Spencer (1824 – November 1839) killed, along with servant William McKath, when falling tree crushed their house.
- Joseph Spencer (1829 – 1 January 1891)
- Richard Augustus Spencer (1831 – 31 October 1890)

== Post script ==
Spencer's home, built in 1831, was called The Old Farm and was located at Strawberry Hill in the current Albany suburb of Mira Mar. He and his family took ownership in 1833. It is now preserved by the National Trust of Australia. The Old Farm at Strawberry Hill has exceptional national and state cultural significance as it was the first farm in the state of Western Australia, about 6 acres (2.4 ha) being developed by the officers of the military settlement of King George's Sound. Vegetables were grown there for the survival of the soldiers and then the early settlers. A cottage was constructed by Dr Alexander Collie, the first Government Resident, for a visit by Governor Stirling in 1831. It was extended in 1836 by Richard Spencer.

== Footnotes ==
Notes

Citations
