= Ann Spencer =

British wife of RN Captain Richard Spencer (1793-1855)

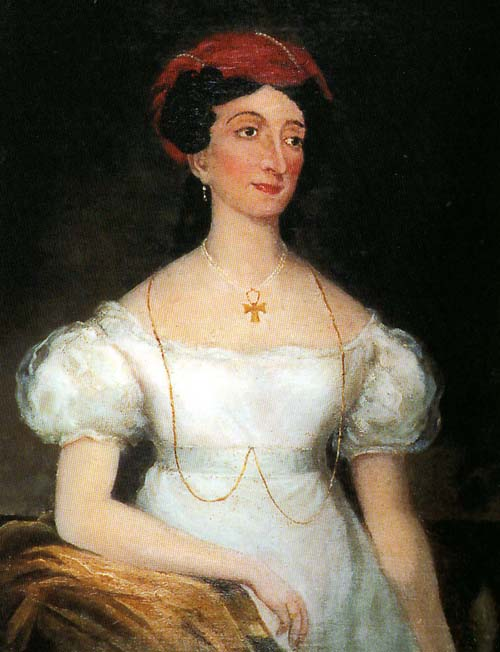
- A portrait of Lady Spencer
- Born: Ann Warden Liddon circa 1793; Charmouth, Dorset
- Died: 19 July 1855 (aged 61–62); Perth, Western Australia
- Occupation: Table
- Known for: Wife of the Government Resident of Albany, Western Australia
- Spouse: Sir Richard Spencer (m. 1812; died 1839)
- Children: 10, including Eliza
- Relatives: James Warden (maternal grandfather)

Ann Warden Spencer, Lady Spencer (née Liddon; c. 1793 – 19 July 1855) was the daughter of Captain Matthew Liddon and Ann Warden. She was the wife of British Royal Navy Captain Sir Richard Spencer.

== Early life ==
Ann's mother was the Lady of the Manor of Charmouth in Dorset who married Matthew Liddon on 22 June 1789 in the presence of her father, the ill-fated James Warden. They had at least five children, James (born 1790), Ann (1793), Sophia (1795), Lucy (1798) and Matthew (1800). The Liddons were an important family in Axminster, where they are shown as Farmers and Clothiers.

== Marriage ==
At the time of Ann's marriage on 31 August 1812 to Captain Richard Spencer, a distinguished post captain in the Royal Navy, at St Matthew's Church, Charmouth, they were possibly living at Langmoor Manor. She was seventeen years old and Richard Spencer was thirty-three. Ann's marriage portion was £2,000, a sizeable sum for those days and when her husband died in 1839, this amount was still intact. Ann and Richard settled on a farm at Lyme Regis, Dorset, for seventeen years, during which nine of their ten children were born. Ann was to be one of the earliest emigrants to Australia when she left England in 1833 with her nine children. By then she was Lady Spencer and accompanying her husband Captain Sir Richard Spencer, he was taking up his appointment of Government Resident at Albany.

== Later life ==
Ann's family lived at Strawberry Hill Farm in Albany. Of their daughters, Eliza Lucy was married to Sir George Grey, and Augusta was married to George Edward Egerton-Warburton, a pioneer settler near Mount Barker. Ann spent the remainder of her life in Western Australia, dying on 19 July 1855 at Perth. Her remains were shipped to Albany for interment.
