= John Lorimer Worden =

US Navy admiral (1818–1897)

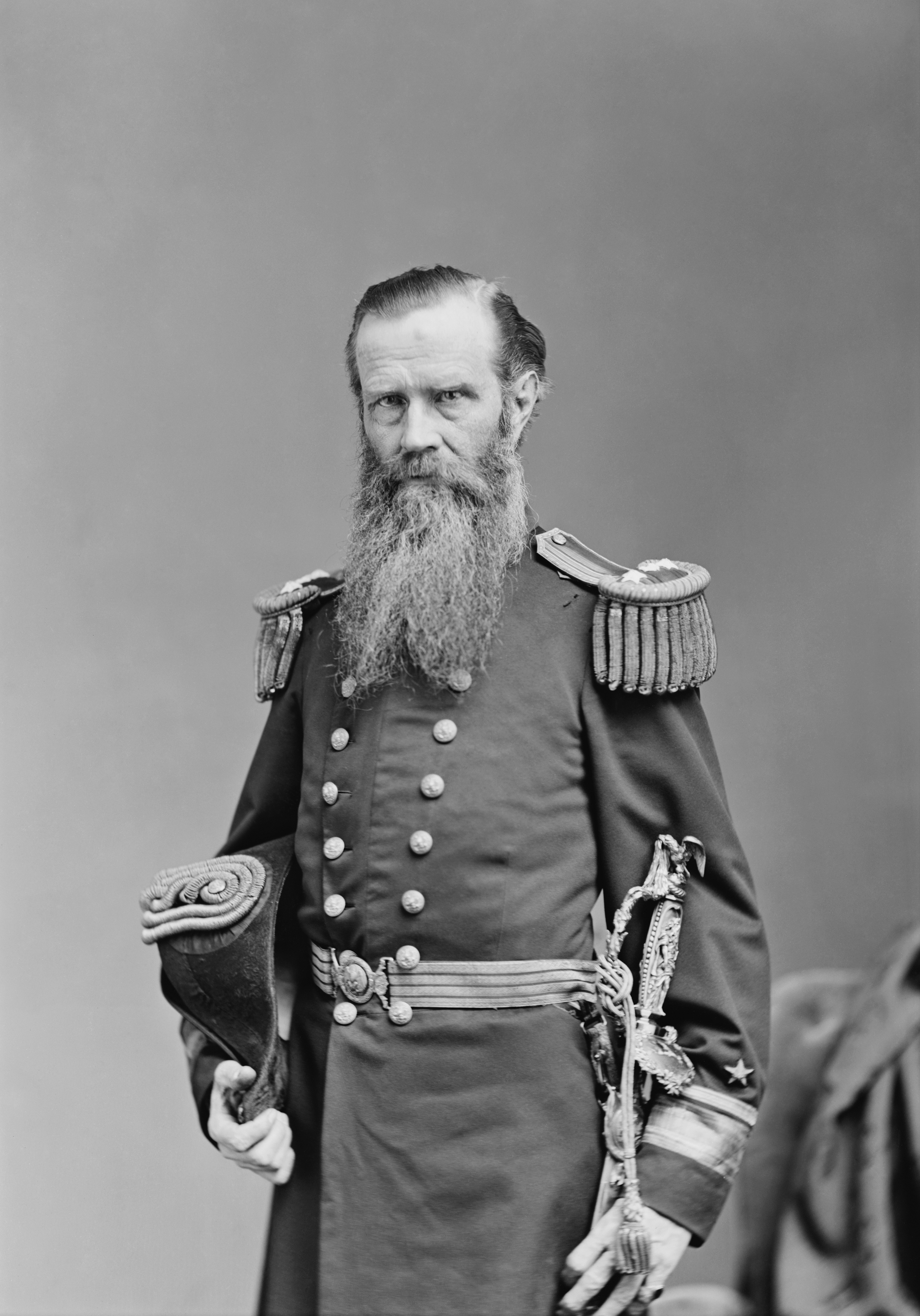
- Born: March 12, 1818; Mount Pleasant, New York, US
- Died: October 18, 1897 (aged 79); Washington, D.C., US
- Burial place: Pawling, New York, US
- Military career
- Allegiance: United States of America
- Branch: United States Navy; Union Navy
- Service years: 1834–1886
- Rank: Rear Admiral
- Commands: USS Monitor; USS Montauk; United States Naval Academy; European Squadron
- Conflicts: Mexican–American War; American Civil War: Battle of Hampton Roads

John Lorimer Worden (March 12, 1818 – October 18, 1897) was a U.S. Navy officer in the American Civil War, who took part in the Battle of Hampton Roads, the first-ever engagement between ironclad steamships at Hampton Roads, Virginia, on March 9, 1862.

Commanding the Union's only warship of this class, USS Monitor, Worden challenged the Confederate vessel Virginia, a converted steam-frigate that had sunk two Union blockaders and damaged two others. After a four-hour battle, both ships withdrew, unable to pierce the other's armour.

== Background and early career ==
Worden was born in Scarborough, New York. He grew up in Swartwoutville, Dutchess County, New York, and was married to Olivia Toffey, the aunt of Daniel Toffey, captain's clerk of the USS Monitor. He was appointed midshipman in the Navy on January 10, 1834. He served his first three years in the sloop-of-war Erie on the Brazil Station. Following that, he was briefly assigned to the sloop Cyane before he reported to the Naval School at Philadelphia, Pennsylvania, for seven months of instruction. He returned to sea in July 1840 for two years with the Pacific Squadron.

Between 1844 and 1846, Worden was stationed at the Naval Observatory in Washington, D.C. During the Mexican–American War, he cruised the west coast, primarily in the store ship Southampton, but in other ships as well. In 1850, he returned to the Naval Observatory for another two-year tour of duty. The ensuing nine years were filled with sea duty which took Worden on several cruises in the Caribbean and Mediterranean Seas.

== Civil War service ==
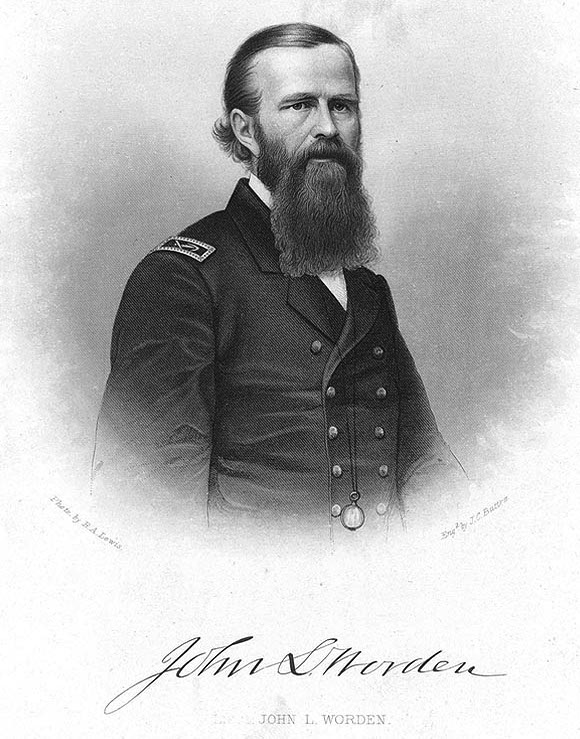
Worden as a lieutenant, c. 1862

Brought to Washington early in 1861, he received orders in April to carry secret dispatches—regarding the reinforcement of Fort Pickens—south to the warships at Pensacola. During the return journey north, Worden was arrested near Montgomery, Alabama, and was held prisoner until being exchanged about seven months later.

=== Taking command of the Monitor ===
Though still ill as a result of his imprisonment, Lieutenant Worden accepted orders to command the new ironclad Monitor on January 16, 1862. He reported to her building site at Greenpoint in Brooklyn on Long Island and supervised her completion. He placed the new warship in commission at the New York Navy Yard on February 25 and two days later sailed for Hampton Roads. However, steering failure forced the ironclad back to New York for repairs. On March 6, she headed south again, this time under tow by Seth Low.

On the afternoon of March 8, Monitor approached Cape Henry, Virginia, while inside Hampton Roads, the Confederacy's own ironclad, CSS Virginia, wrought havoc with the Union Navy's wooden blockading fleet. During that engagement, the Southern warship sank both the sloop USS Cumberland and the frigate USS Congress, as well as severely damaging the steam frigate USS Minnesota before retiring behind Sewell's Point. Arriving on the scene too late to participate in the engagement, Worden and his ship set about assisting the grounded Minnesota.

=== The battle of the ironclads ===
At daybreak on March 9, Virginia emerged once more from behind Sewell's Point to complete her reduction of the Federal fleet at Hampton Roads. As the Confederate ironclad approached Minnesota, Worden maneuvered Monitor from the grounded ship's shadow to engage Virginia in the battle that revolutionized naval warfare. For four hours, the two iron-plated ships slugged it out as they maneuvered in the narrow channel of Hampton Roads, pouring shot and shell at one another to almost no visible effect. Three hours into the slugfest, Worden received facial wounds when a Confederate shell exploded just outside the pilot house that partially blinded him. He relinquished command to his first officer, Samuel D. Greene. About an hour later, Monitor withdrew from the battle temporarily and, upon her return to the scene, found that Virginia, too, had withdrawn. The first battle between steam-driven, armored ships had ended in a draw.

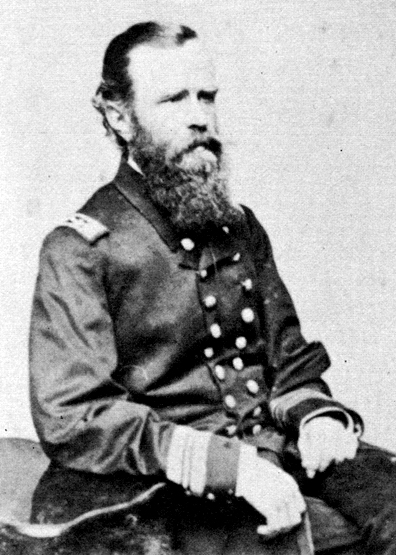
Worden after the Clash of the Ironclads

=== Other wartime commands ===
After the battle, Worden moved ashore to convalesce from his wounds. During that recuperative period, he received the accolade of a grateful nation, the official thanks of the United States Congress, and promotion to commander. Late in 1862, he took command of the ironclad monitor Montauk and placed her in commission at New York on December 14, 1862. Later in the month, Worden took his new ship south to join the South Atlantic Blockading Squadron off Port Royal, South Carolina. On January 27, 1863, he led his ship in the bombardment of Fort McAllister. A month later, newly promoted Captain Worden took his ship into the Ogeechee River, found the Confederate privateer Rattlesnake (formerly CSS Nashville), and destroyed her with five well-placed shots. His last action came of April 7, 1863, when Montauk participated in an attack on Charleston, South Carolina.

== Post-war career and last years ==
Not long after the Charleston attack, Capt. Worden received orders to shore duty in conjunction with the construction of ironclads in New York. That assignment lasted until the late 1860s. He was promoted to commodore in May 1868. In 1869, Commodore Worden began a five-year tour as Superintendent of the United States Naval Academy. In 1872, Worden was promoted to rear admiral. In 1873 he became the first president of the United States Naval Institute.

During the late 1870s, he commanded the European Squadron, visiting ports in northern Europe and patrolling the eastern Mediterranean during the Russo-Turkish War of 1877–78. He returned ashore and concluded his naval career as a member of the Examining Board and as President of the Retiring Board. When he retired on December 23, 1886, Congress voted him full sea pay in his grade for life.

Admiral Worden was a member of the Military Order of the Loyal Legion of the United States, Sons of the American Revolution, Naval Order of the United States and the Military Order of Foreign Wars.

Rear Admiral Worden resided in Washington, D.C., until his death from pneumonia on October 18, 1897. After funeral services at St. John's Episcopal Church in Washington, he was buried in the Pawling Cemetery in Pawling, New York. He was married to Olivia Toffey (1820–1903), and she and three of their four children survived him. His oldest son was John Lorimer Worden, Jr. (1845–1873), who served as a volunteer captain in the U.S. Army during the Civil War and later as a first lieutenant in the regular army until his death in 1873. The second son was Daniel Toffey Worden (1847–1914), a Wall Street stock broker. Worden also had two daughters, Grace Worden (1852–1905) and Olivia Steele Worden (1856–1933). Worden's widow and all of his children except Daniel were buried with him in Pawling, New York.

== Tiffany & Co. sword ==
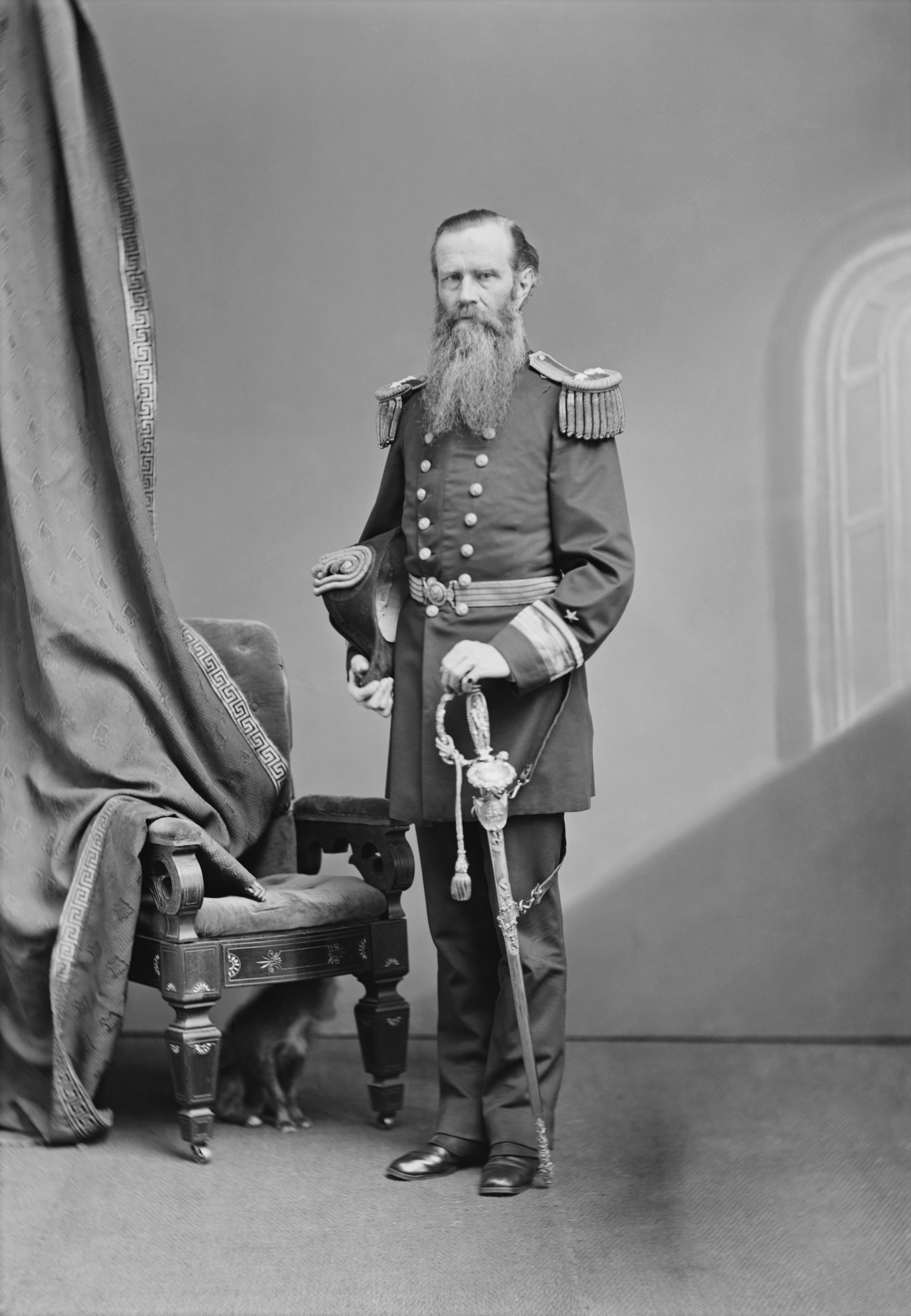
Worden with the sword

After the battle of the Monitor and Virginia the state of New York celebrated their hero with the commissioning of a custom-made 37-inch (940 mm) gold-and-silver inlaid sword from Tiffany & Co. The handle was emblazoned with the Roman god of the sea, Neptune, and included a gold-plated sheath and gold embroidered belt made at the cost of $550. ($16,128 adjusted for inflation as of 2022.)

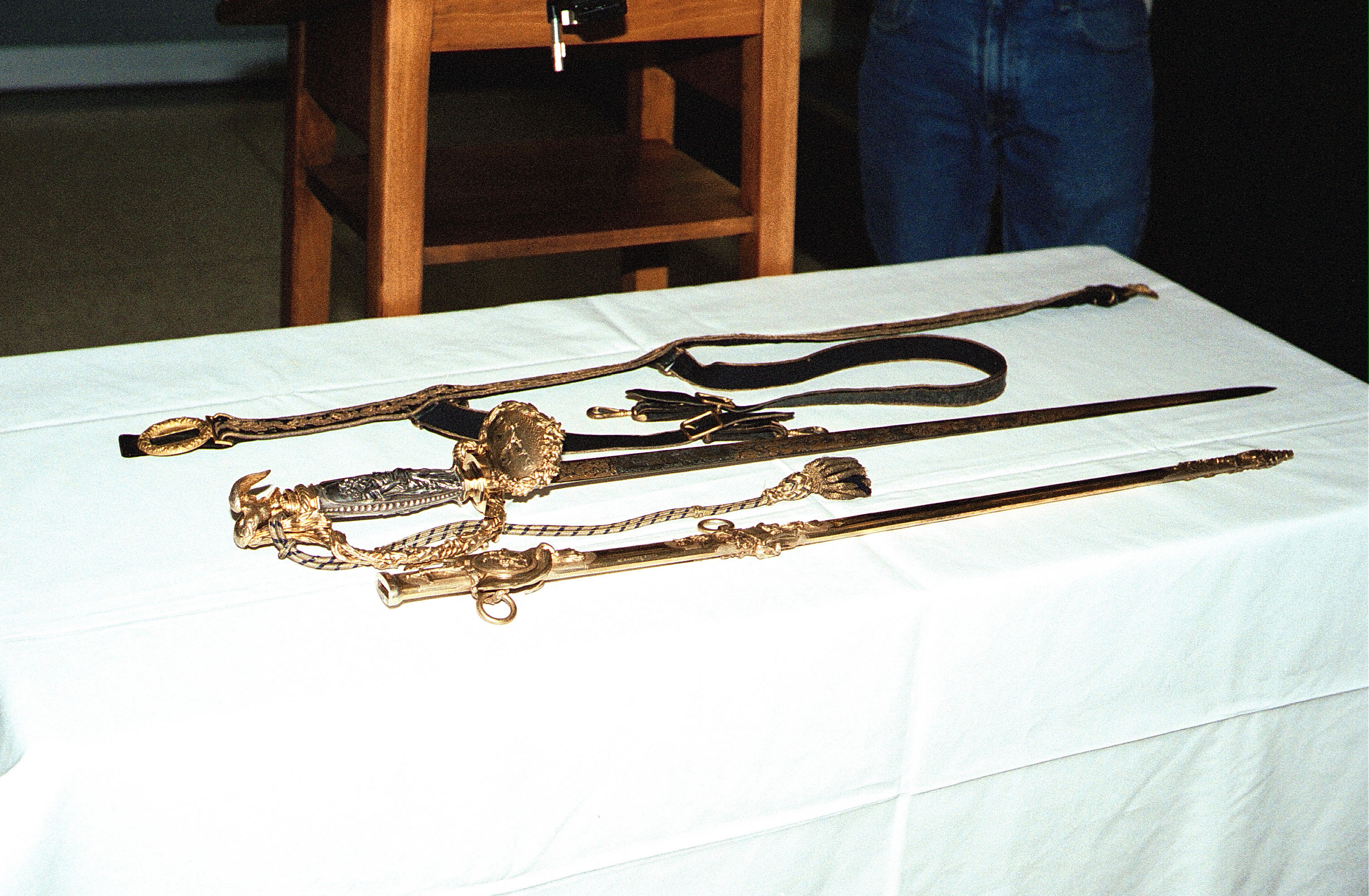
Worden's Sword laid out with its belt and scabbard on display in 2004

In 1912, fifteen years after his death, Worden's family donated the sword to the Naval Academy, where it rested until 1931, when it was stolen. The subsequent naval investigation yielded no leads.

The sword was missing for over six decades until 1998, when the FBI began an investigation into several dealers of the PBS show Antiques Roadshow. By 2002, three men were in jail for $1 million in memorabilia fraud. The FBI continued to delve further into the records of the appraisers, searching for more stolen items. The sword had been purchased by an appraiser and then resold to a collector. After the FBI verified the sword was stolen, it was confiscated and returned to the Naval Academy.

== Namesake ==
Fort Worden, located in Port Townsend, Washington, and four United States Navy ships have been named USS Worden for him. The parade field at the United States Naval Academy is named in his honor. The John L. Worden Camp 150, Sons of Union Veterans of the Civil War, is based in Peekskill, New York, not far from Worden's grave in Pawling, New York.

== See also ==
- List of superintendents of the United States Naval Academy

== Bibliography ==
- Nelson, James L. 2004. The Reign of Iron: The Story of the First Battling Ironclads, the Monitor and the Merrimack. HarperCollins Publishers, NY. ISBN 0-06-052403-0
- Still, William N. (1988). Hill, Dina B. (ed.). Ironclad Captains: The Commanding Officers of the U. S. S. Monitor. Washington, D.C.: National Oceanic and Atmospheric Administration, U.S. Government Printing Office. p. 83. ISBN 9780160035609.

Academic offices
| Preceded by David D. Porter | Superintendent of United States Naval Academy; 1869-1874 | Succeeded by Christopher R.P. Rodgers |
