= Old Farm, Strawberry Hill =

Farm in Albany, Western Australia

Strawberry Hill / Barmup
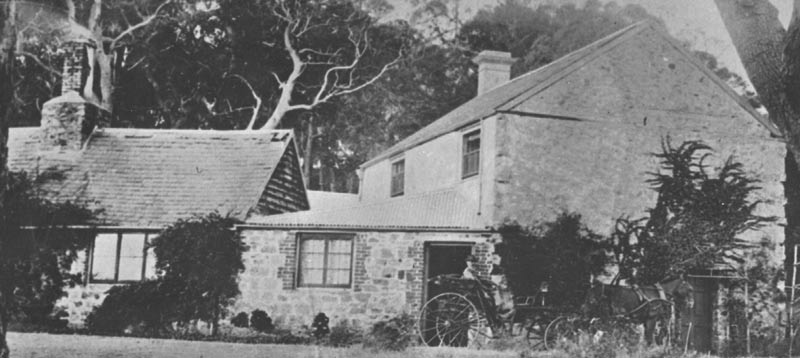
- Photograph of Strawberry Hill / Barmup
- Interactive map of the Strawberry Hill / Barmup area

General information
- Type: Heritage listed building
- Location: Albany, Western Australia
- Coordinates: 35°01′05.5″S 117°54′00.5″E

Western Australia Heritage Register
- Type: State Registered Place
- Designated: 2 July 1993
- Reference no.: 32

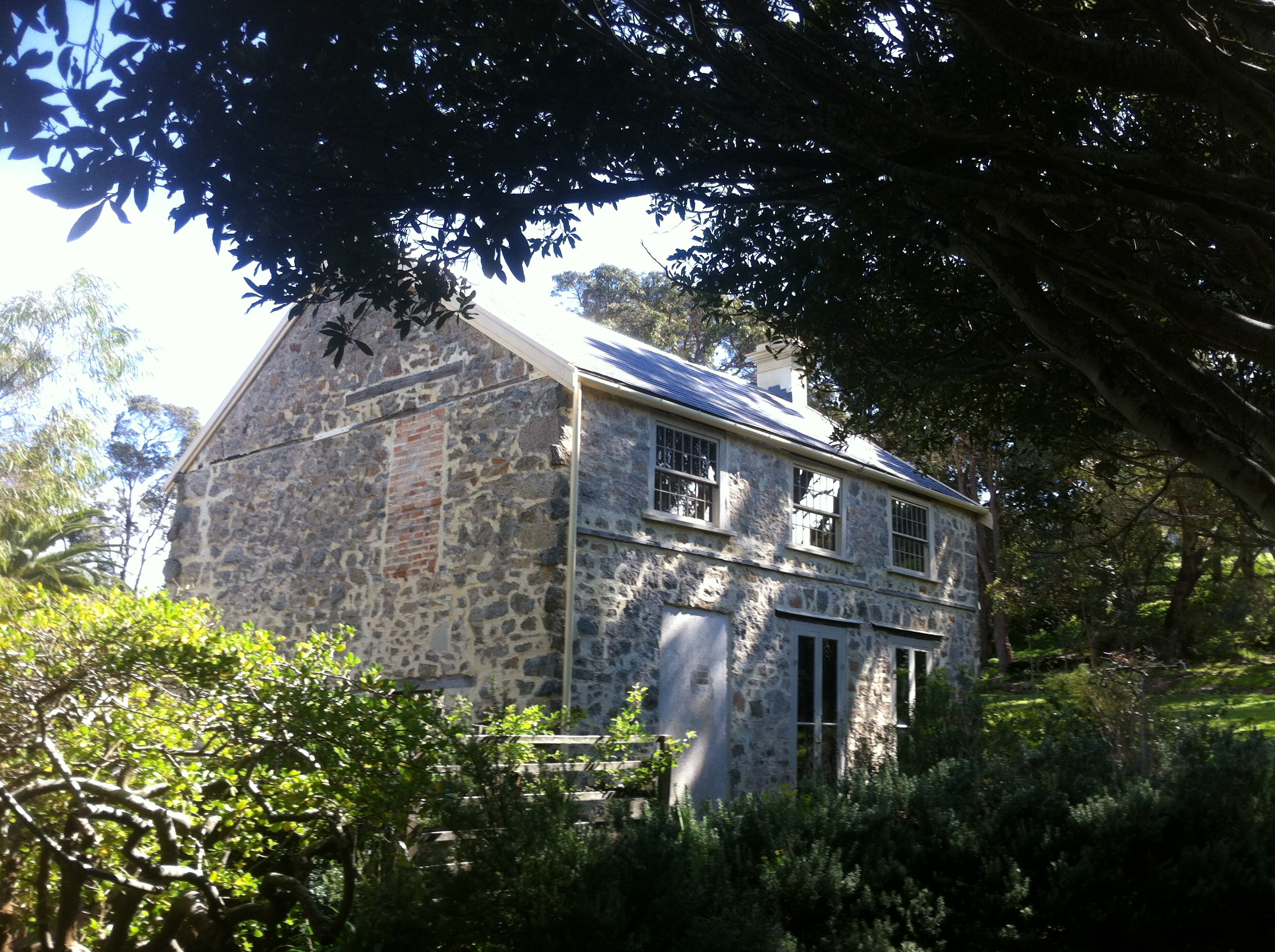
Farm house at Old Farm 2015

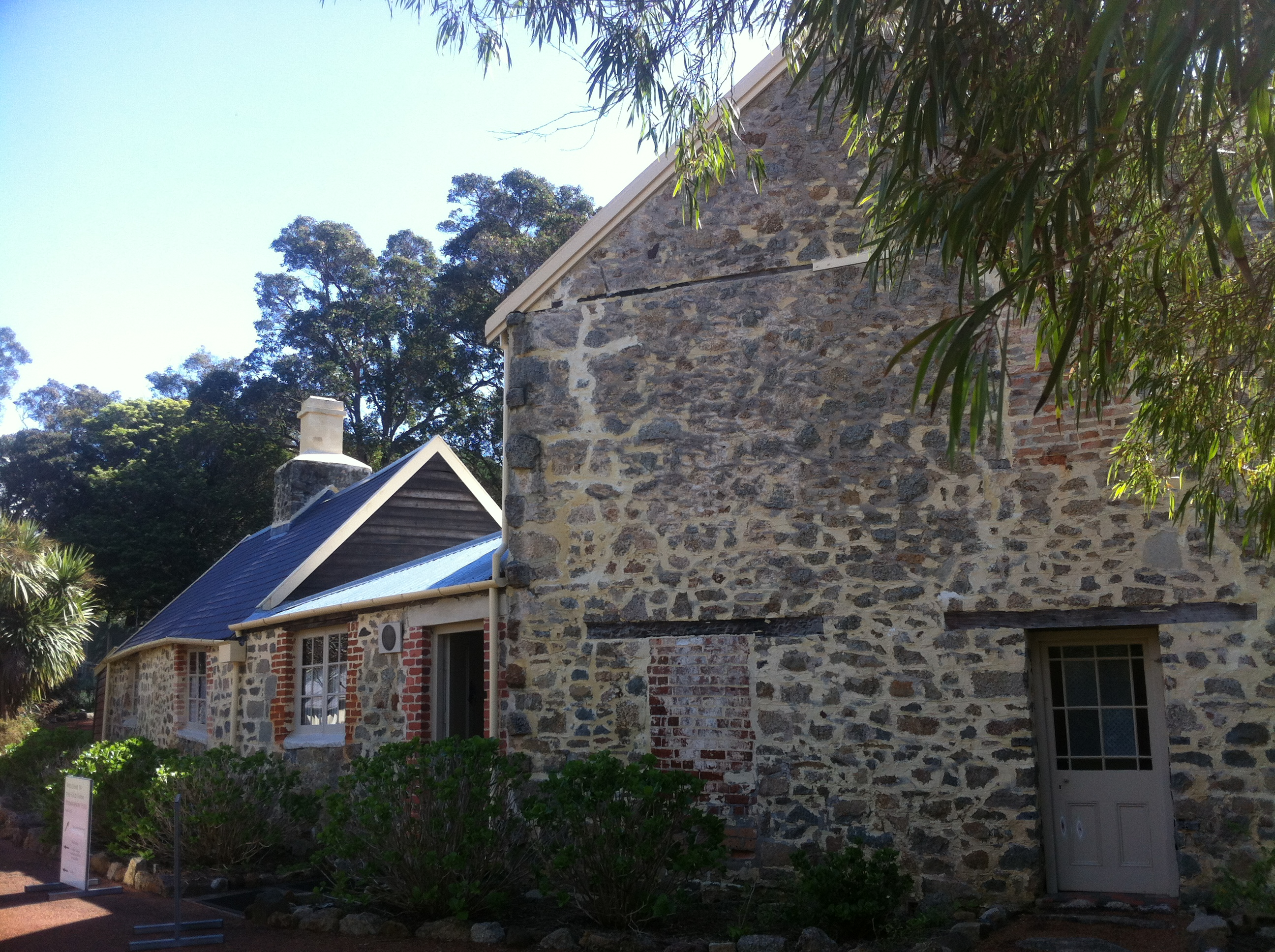
Farm house side view 2015

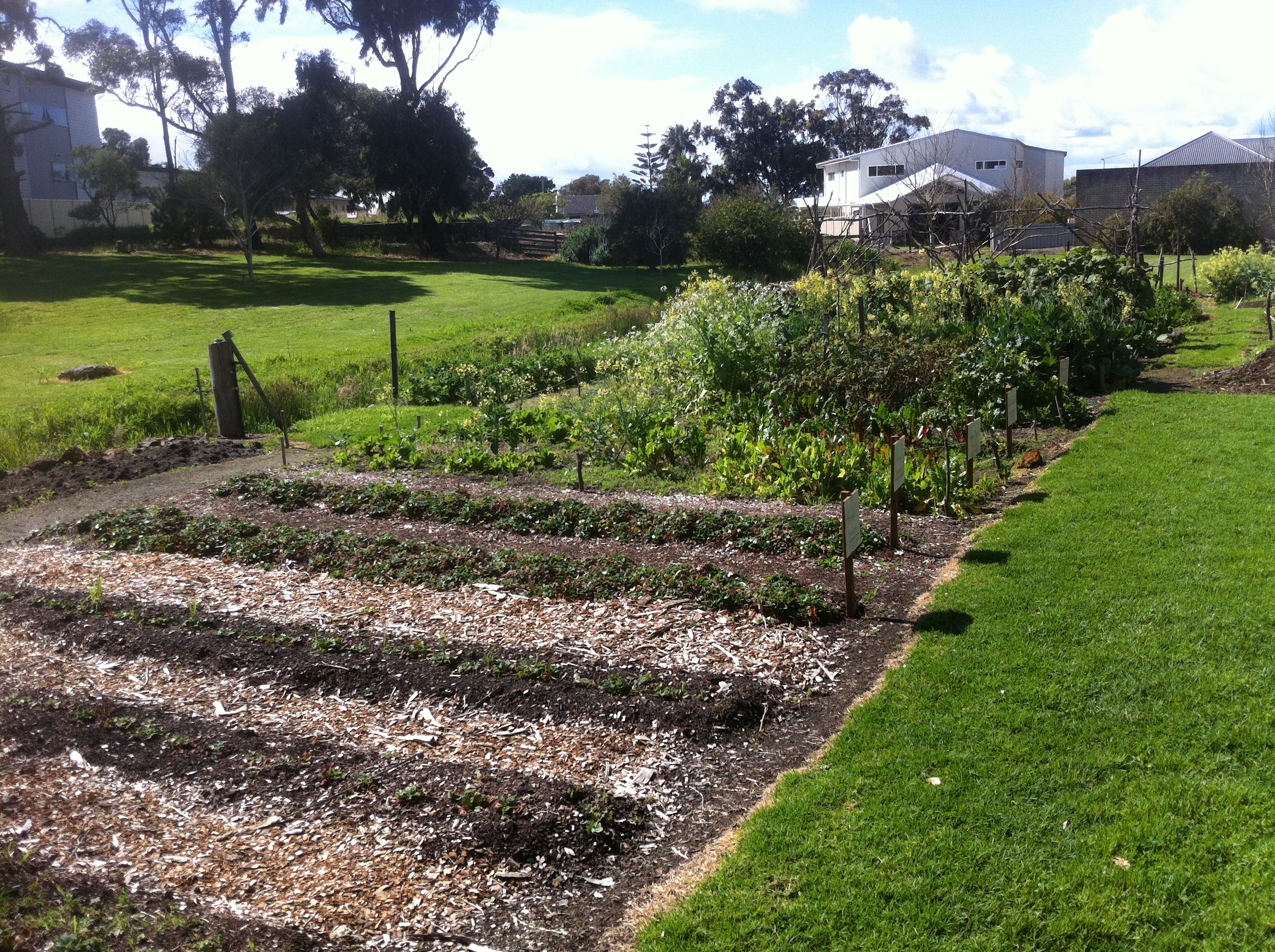
Vegetable patch at Strawberry Hill

The Old Farm, now known as Strawberry Hill/Barmup, is located on Strawberry Hill in the suburb of Mira Mar in Albany, Western Australia. It is known as being the first farm in Western Australia.

The hill on which the property is situated rises to a height of 72 metres (237 ft) and is a spur of Mount Clarence. The soil is a mixture of clay and gravel with rich black loam on the lower side.

The farm was initially established in 1827 as a government farm when the first Europeans settled at King George Sound. Edmund Lockyer, Alexander Collie and John Lawrence Morley selected the site as a government farm. Originally it occupied an area of 622 hectares (1,536 acres) but only 2 hectares (6 acres) remain today. The next three commandants of the settlement, Captain Wakefield, Lieutenant Sleeman and Captain Collet Barker, followed Lockyer's plan of continuing to develop the farm.

Alexander Collie was appointed Government Resident of Albany in 1831 and moved into a wattle and daub cottage situated on the farm. He named the property Strawberry Hill after the small plot of strawberries he was cultivating. Collie retired in 1832 and his successor was D. H. Macleod but it was the farm superintendent John Lawrence Morley who handed the property onto Richard Spencer.

Spencer was appointed as Government Resident in 1833; he acquired the farm and resided there with his wife, Ann, and his ten children. Spencer arranged for the erection of a granite two-storey building at the rear end of the original wattle and daub structure at a cost of £100. The garden was now well established and producing blood oranges, raspberries, grapes, asparagus, figs and almonds. The first visitors to stay in the new building included Charles Darwin and Captain Robert FitzRoy, of HMS Beagle.

The old thatched roof wattle and daub part of the main residence burned down in 1870. A second cottage was built by Charles Miner in the same year.

Francis Bird, the Chief Architect of Western Australia, acquired the property in 1889 and changed the name from Strawberry Hill to the Old Farm. His family retained ownership of the farm until the 1950s.

The site lay derelict for many years until being purchased by the Federal Government in 1956 and it was then vested in the National Trust of Australia in 1964. Conservation work commenced shortly afterward and it was later opened to the public.

== See also ==
- List of places on the State Register of Heritage Places in the City of Albany
