= Town of Albany =

Former local government area in Australia

Coordinates: 35°01′22″S 117°52′53″E

Town of Albany (former) Western Australia
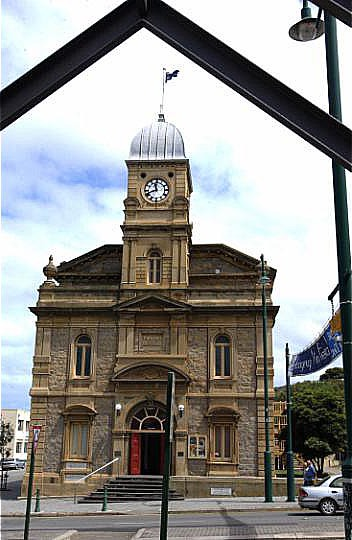
- Population: 14,510 (1996 census)
  - Density: 421/km^{2} (1,090/sq mi)
- Established: 1871
- Area: 34.4 km^{2} (13.3 sq mi)
- Council seat: Albany
- Region: Great Southern
- State electorate(s): Albany
- Federal division(s): Forrest

The Town of Albany was a local government area in the Great Southern region of Western Australia representing the town of Albany, 410 kilometres (255 mi) south-southeast of the capital, Perth.

== History ==
The Municipality of Albany was gazetted on 21 February 1871. It was initially headed by a chairman until 1885, after which the municipality had a succession of early notable mayors.

William Finlay was the first mayor of Albany when he was elected in 1885. William Grills Knight was elected in 1886 and was succeeded by Lancel Victor de Hamel in 1889. John Moir was elected after De Hamel left to enter state politics later the same year and served until 1890. Robert Andrew Muir was elected in 1891 and retired at the end of his year's term due to ill health. Moir was reelected from 1894 to 1897.

The municipality was granted town status and renamed the Town of Albany on 1 July 1961.

It amalgamated with the Shire of Albany to become the City of Albany on 1 July 1998.
