= Jubilee Bandstand =

Heritage listed structure in Albany, Western Australia

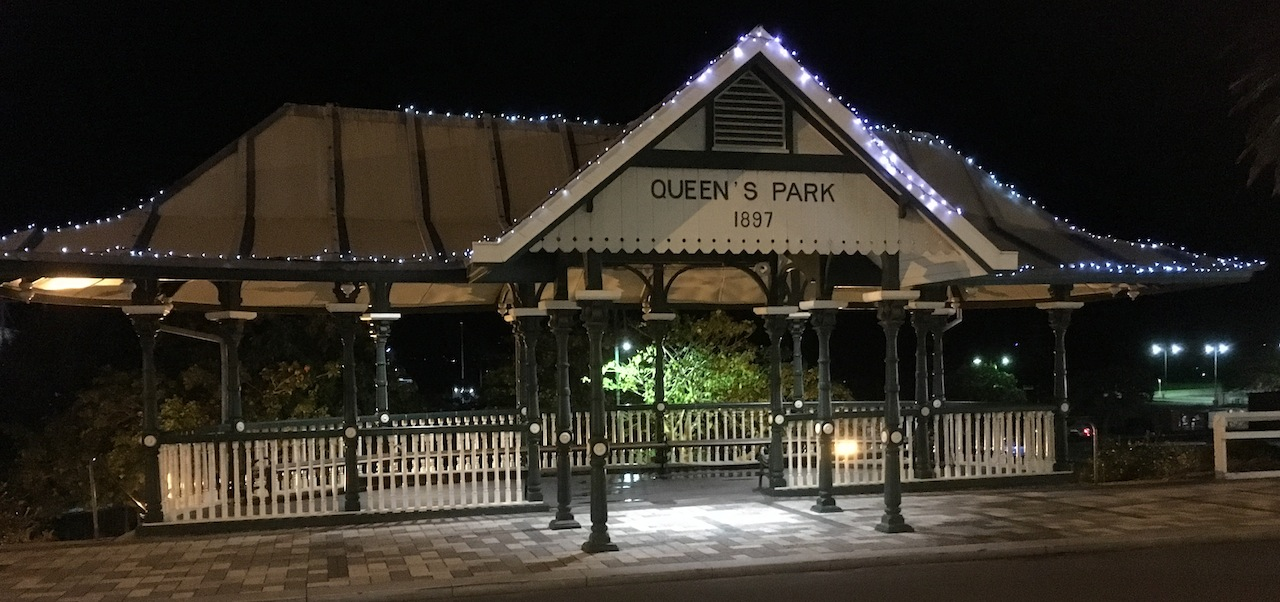
- Interactive map of the Jubilee Bandstand area
- Former names: Queen's Park Rotunda, Albany Rotunda, Jubilee Rotunda

General information
- Architectural style: Federation Filigree
- Location: Stirling Terrace, Albany
- Coordinates: 35.0272°S 117.8853°E
- Construction started: 1897
- Completed: 1898

Design and construction
- Architect: Robert Greenshields
- Main contractor: Nobby Clark

Western Australia Heritage Register
- Type: State Registered Place
- Designated: 29 November 1996
- Part of: Stirling Terrace Precinct, Albany (14922)
- Reference no.: 53

References
- Heritage Council of Western Australia

The Jubilee Bandstand also known as Queen's Park Rotunda or Jubilee Rotunda is a heritage listed building located between Stirling Terrace and Proudlove Parade overlooking Queens Park, the Memorial Gardens and Princess Royal Harbour in Albany in the Great Southern region of Western Australia.

The rotunda is a decorative open sided pavilion on a half ellipse design. It is built in a Federation Carpenter Gothic style, displaying use of timber craftsmanship, with elaborate balusters, posts, capitals, brackets and bosses. A curved granite retaining wall forms the base of the rotunda and steps lead down to Proudlove Parade. It has a central gabled entrance, facing Stirling Terrace, and is the only entrance to the rotunda. This gabled section appears to be a recently added item. A perimeter timber balustrades is continuous around the rotunda interrupted only at the entrance. Timber posts and beams support a timber framed, zinc clad roof.

In 1890, the Mayor of Albany, John Moir, proposed that the embankment along Stirling Terrace be converted to parkland. The embankment on which the pavilion is located was a rubbish tip before the stand was built. The surrounds were converted to parkland, known as Queens Park, and were opened in 1897 to honour the Diamond Jubilee of Queen Victoria.

Construction of the bandstand commenced in 1897. The bandstand was designed by Robert Greenshields and built local carpenter and joiner by Nobby Clark. The state government contributed £150, the council voted £90 with additional revenue raised by public subscription. It was opened in May 1898.

The Chairman of the Bandstand committee was John Moir, who handed the bandstand over to the new Mayor, William Grills Knight.

The rotunda was used regularly for events such as concerts, public addresses and ceremonial occasions such as the reception of the official party for Great White Fleet in 1908. In the late 1940s the covered entrance to the bandstand was removed and the size of the park was reduced when roads and parking bays were introduced into the area.

Repairs to the bandstand were carried out in 1972, it was entered onto the Register of the National Estate in 1977, and in 1992 further restoration work was carried out on the bandstand.

== See also ==
- List of places on the State Register of Heritage Places in the City of Albany
