= Stirling Terrace =

Stirling Terrace may refer to:

- Stirling Terrace, Albany, Western Australia
- Stirling Terrace, Toodyay, Western Australia
