= Memorial Park Cemetery (Albany, Western Australia) =

Cemetery in Albany, Western Australia

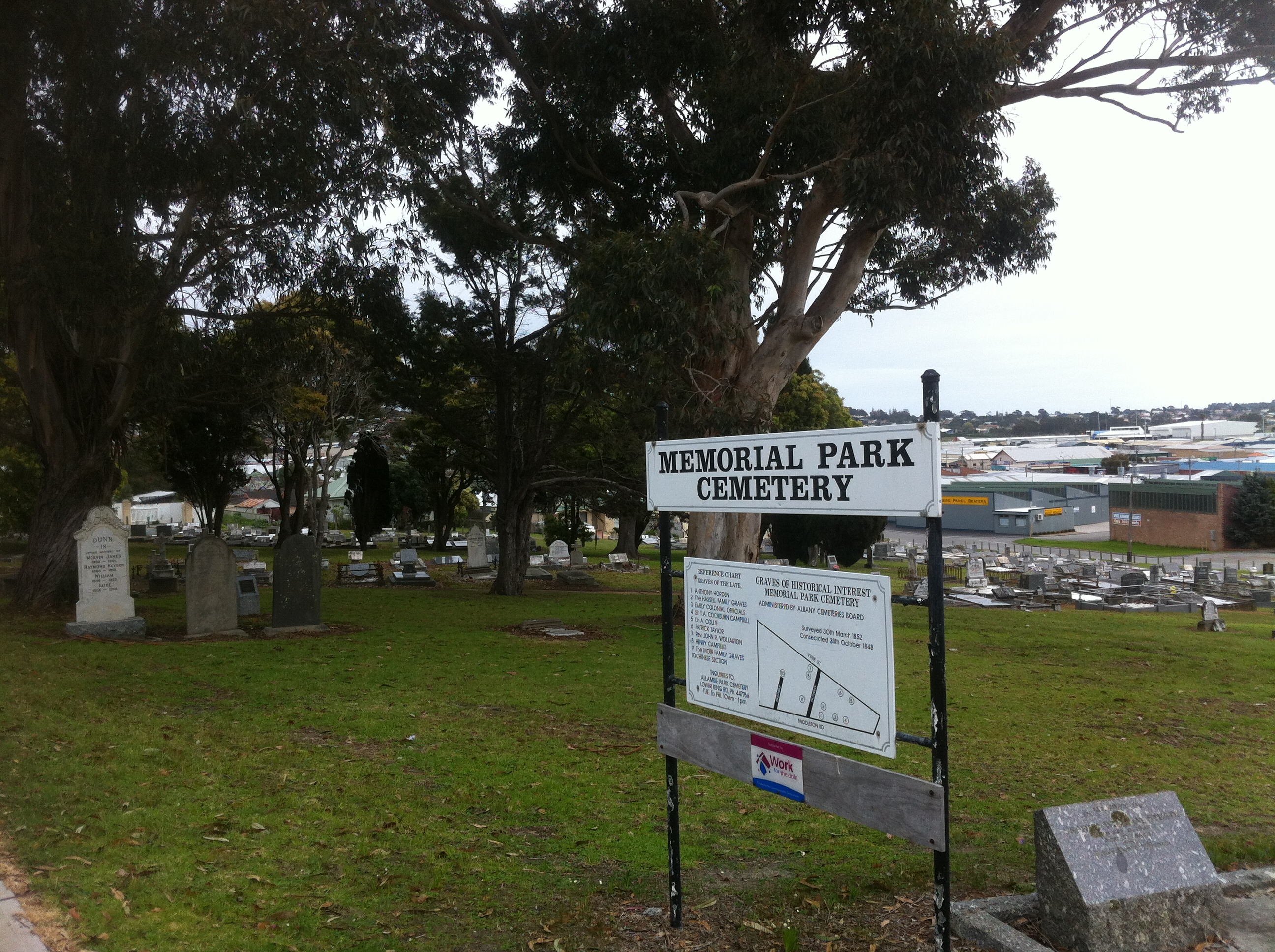
- Lower side of Memorial Park Cemetery 2015
- Interactive map of Memorial Park Cemetery

Details
- Location: Albany, Western Australia
- Coordinates: 35°01′04″S 117°53′22″E
- Find a Grave: Memorial Park Cemetery

Western Australia Heritage Register
- Official name: Albany Memorial Park Cemetery
- Type: State Register
- Designated: 14 February 2003
- Reference no.: 15756

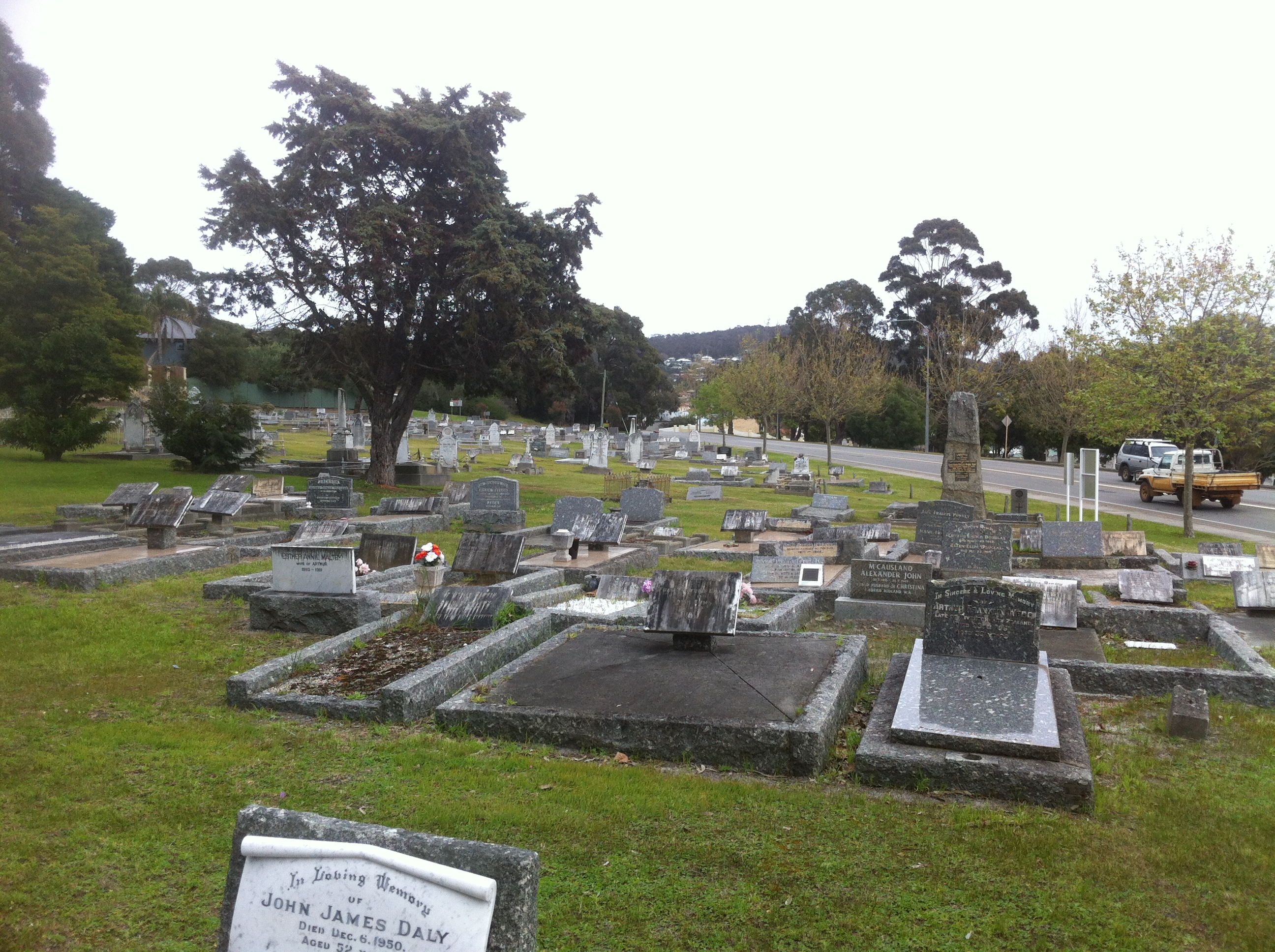
Upper side of Memorial Park Cemetery 2015

Memorial Park Cemetery also known as Pioneer Cemetery and Old Albany Cemetery is a cemetery located along Middleton Road in the city of Albany in the Great Southern region of Western Australia.

It was constructed in 1836 and is the first consecrated cemetery in Western Australia, gazetted in 1840 as a public burial ground to provide for the needs of a growing community. It was closed as a public cemetery in 1959, with a few burials being held there until 2000 and ashes placed there until 2009. Most burials now being held at Allambie Park Cemetery. It is thought to be the longest serving public cemetery in Western Australia.

The hillside cemetery occupies an area of approximately 2.5 hectares (6 acres) and is divided into denominational sections containing a total of approximately 5,000 graves. It is composed of two parts, the upper cemetery and the lower cemetery, separated by Middleton Road. Easily accessed by pedestrians the site has a number of mature native and exotic trees and a range of diversity, style and age of memorials and grave fittings on the plots.

Classified by the National Trust in 2000, the cemetery was listed on the permanent register of the Heritage Council of Western Australia in 2003.

== Notable burials ==
- Francis Bird
- Henry Camfield
- John Wollaston
- Alexander Collie
- Alexander Cockburn-Campbell
- Spencer family
- Hassell family
- William Grills Knight
- Moir family
- Robert Andrew Muir
- William Finlay (mayor)

== See also ==
- List of places on the State Register of Heritage Places in the City of Albany
