= Albany House =

Former bank building in Albany, Western Australia

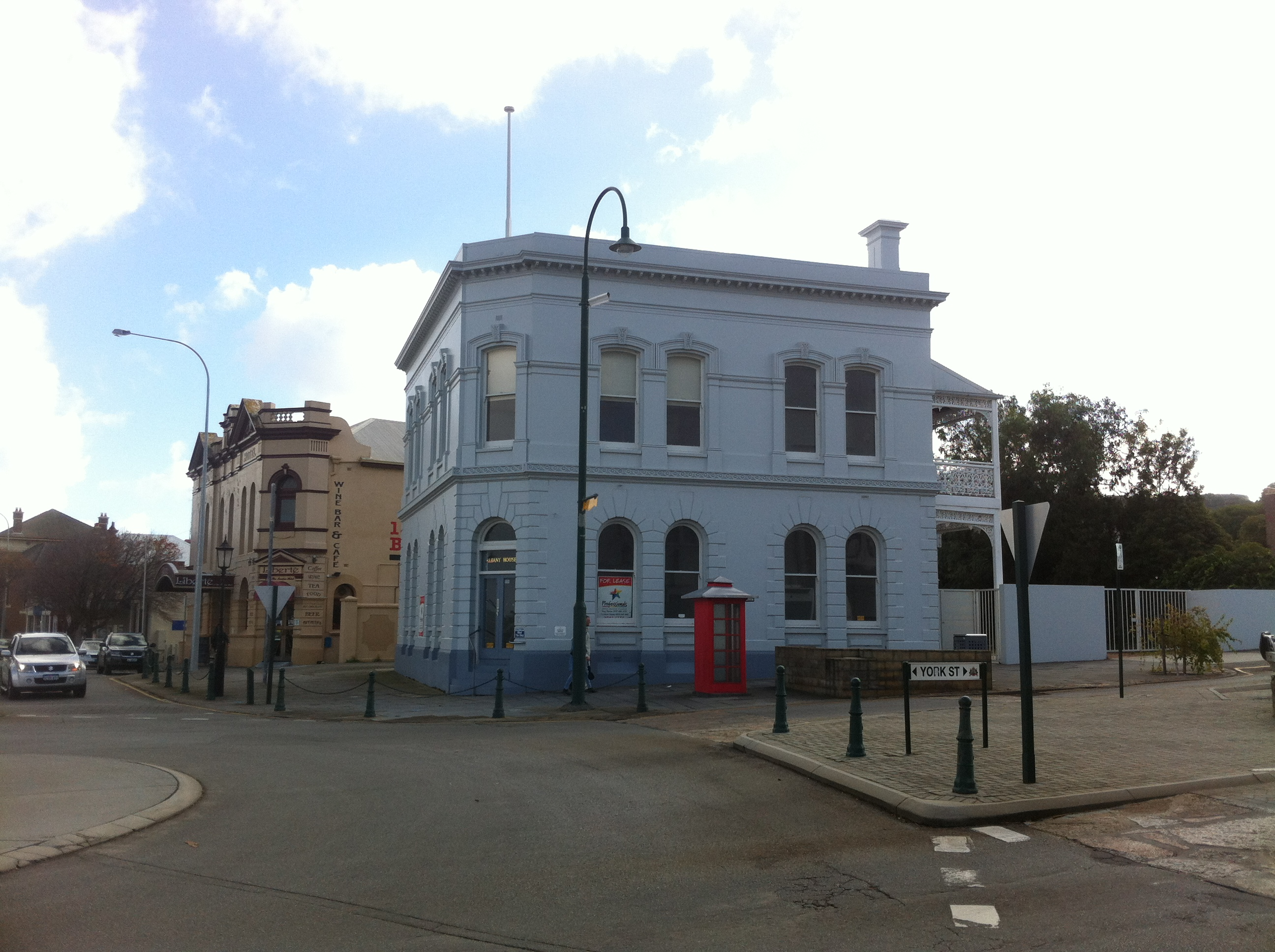
- Former names: Union Bank, QBE Insurance

General information
- Architectural style: Victorian Regency
- Location: 119-125 York Street, Albany
- Coordinates: 35.0267°S 117.8834°E
- Construction started: 1884
- Completed: 1884

Design and construction
- Architect: George Charles Inskip
- Main contractor: Charles Keyser

Western Australia Heritage Register
- Type: State Registered Place
- Designated: 2 July 1999
- Reference no.: 58

References
- Heritage Council of Western Australia

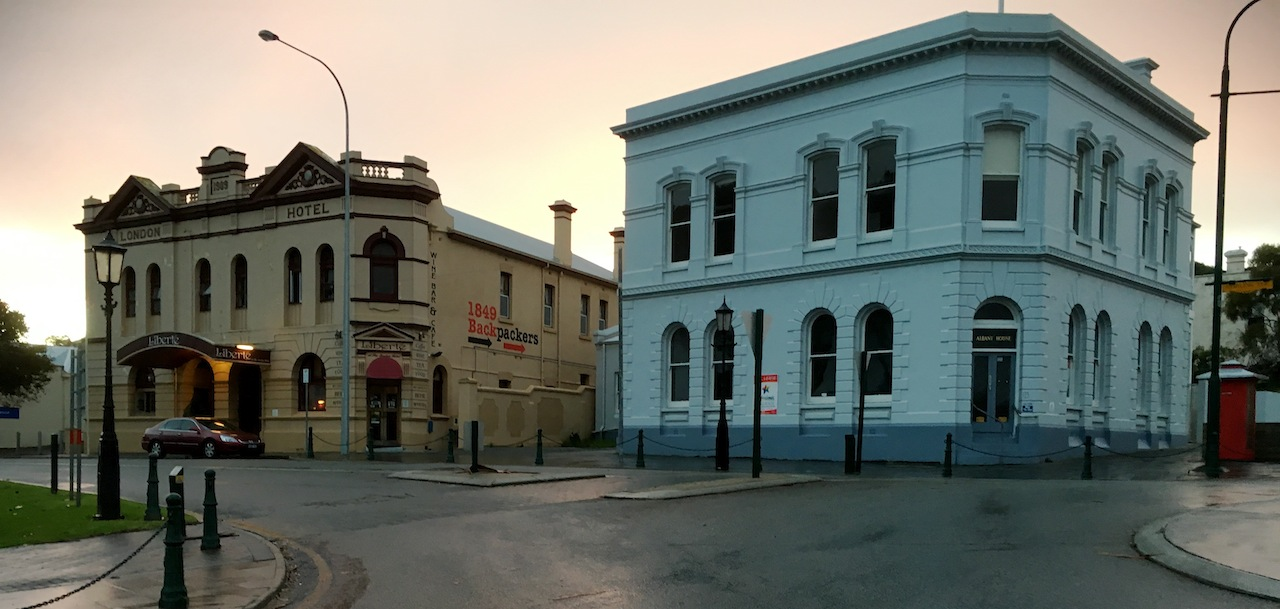
London Hotel on the left and Albany House on the right

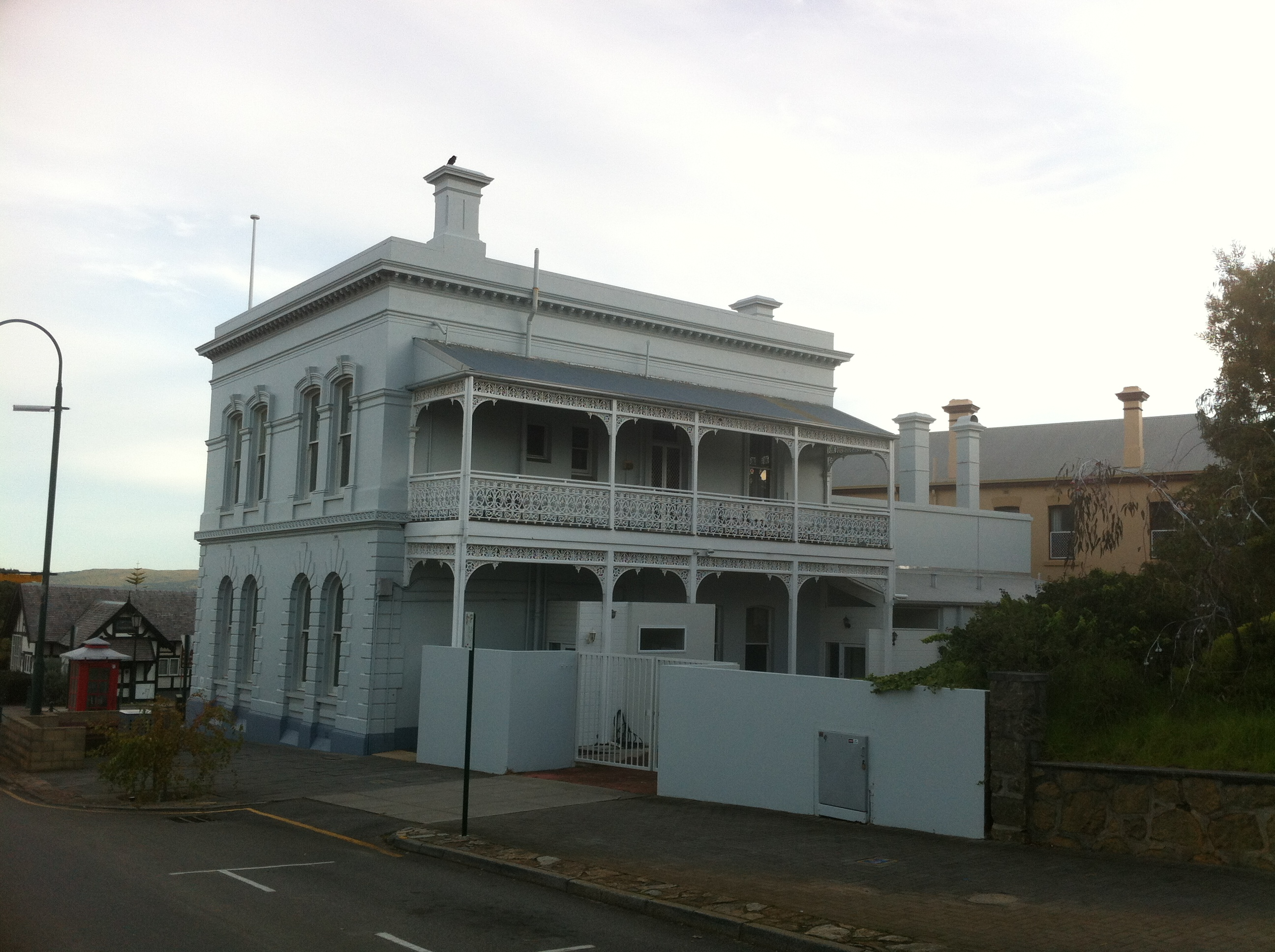
Albany House balcony from York Street

Albany House is a heritage listed building located on the corner of Stirling Terrace and York Street overlooking Princess Royal Harbour in Albany in the Great Southern region of Western Australia.

The building was originally constructed as the Union Bank of Australia building, and completed in 1884. The banking chamber occupied the ground floor while the manager's residence took up the first floor.

The two storey building was built in the Victorian Regency style; it is constructed from load-bearing masonry that has been rendered and painted. A rendered plinth at the base of the building is continuous around the main facade and is deepest at the truncated corner as the site slopes to the south. A single storey wing extends from the western side to the boundary with the London Hotel. The building has a dominant square form with a truncated corner, where the main entrance is located, at the intersection of Stirling Terrace and York Street. A decorative frieze stringcourse is found between the ground and first floors with further horizontal mouldings. The two street facades are identical and broken into bays by the pairing of the arched windows. The north facing balcony has timber flooring and a balustrade of cast iron panels. The building is topped with corrugated iron roofing concealed behind a parapet. Chimneys with moulded tops and a flagpole at the south east corner top the building.

A branch of the Union Bank was opened in 1878 by the general manager, John Franklin McMullen. The Commercial and National Banks both also had branches in the town. McMullen then acquired the present site in 1879. With the construction of the Great Southern Railway and the economic future of Albany looking secure planning started to construct new premises.

The building was designed by architect George Charles Inskip in 1884. Inskip had also designed the Union bank buildings in Perth, Fremantle. Roebourne and Geraldton. Tenders for the Albany building were called for later the same year with the foundation stone laid in August. It was built by Charles Keyser, who also constructed Vancouver House, another heritage listed building further down Stirling Terrace.

In 1945 the block was subdivided and the land behind the building fronting York Street was sold. The building had some renovations in 1950. The Union Bank and the Bank of Australasia merged in 1951 to form the Australian and New Zealand Bank. In 1970, the bank then took over the English, Scottish and Australian Bank and became the Australia and New Zealand Banking Group Ltd. and eventually moved to premises on Albany Highway. In 1973 the building was completely vacated and new premises were opened in Peel Place. Albany House was sold in 1975 to the Wyness family, then in 1976 to the Bellemore family, who renovated the building. QBE Insurance used the ground floor as offices in 1999.

In 2005 the building received a A$5,000 grant from the state government to assist with the cost of preparing a conservation plan.

== See also ==
- List of places on the State Register of Heritage Places in the City of Albany
