= Western Australian Bank, Albany Branch =

Heritage listed bank building in Albany, Western Australia

Western Australian Bank, Albany (former)
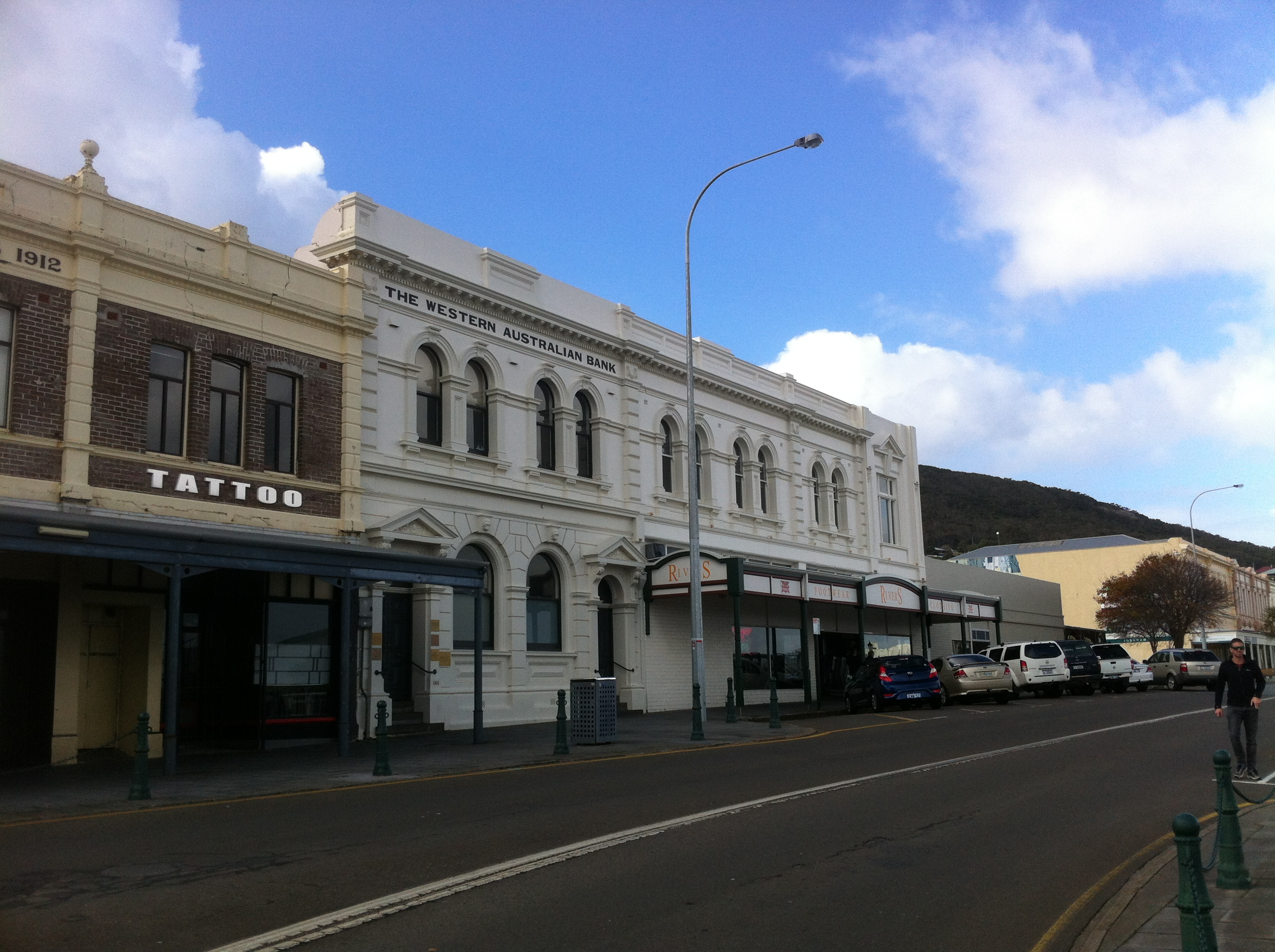
- Interactive map of the Western Australian Bank, Albany (former) area
- Former names: Bank of New South Wales, Commercial Bank, Haynes Robinson

General information
- Architectural style: Federation Academic Classical style
- Location: 142-144 Stirling Terrace, Albany
- Coordinates: 35.026777°S 117.884294°E
- Construction started: 1890
- Completed: 1891
- Cost: £6697

Design and construction
- Architect: Joseph John Talbot Hobbs
- Main contractor: J Hurst and son

Western Australia Heritage Register
- Type: State Registered Place
- Designated: 7 December 2007
- Part of: Stirling Terrace Precinct, Albany (14922)
- Reference no.: 60

References
- Heritage Council of Western Australia

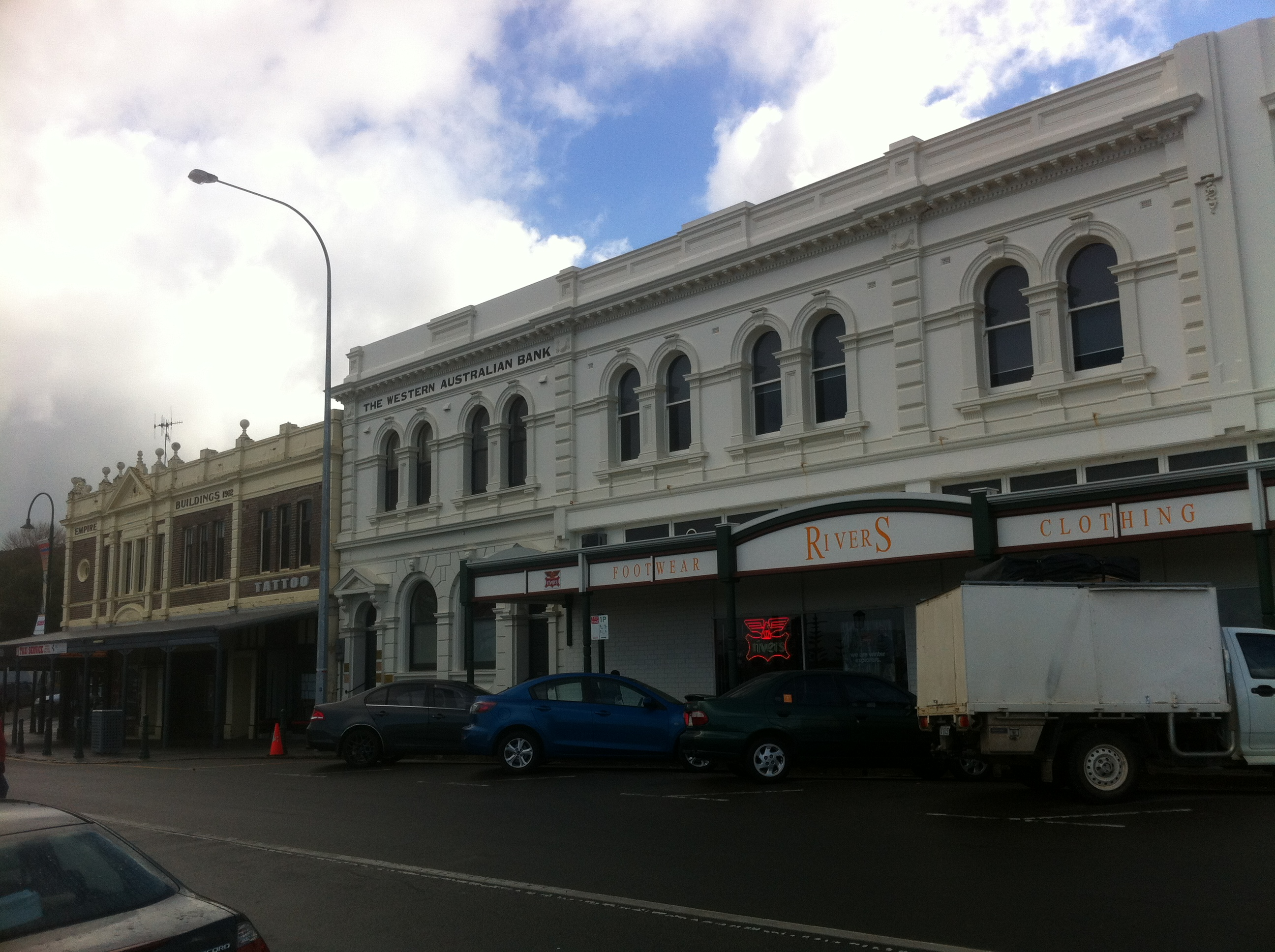
Western Australian Bank building on Stirling Terrace

The Western Australian Bank, Albany, also known as the Haynes Robinson building, is a heritage listed building located on Stirling Terrace overlooking Princess Royal Harbour in Albany in the Great Southern region of Western Australia.

It was built in the Federation Academic Classical style and originally housed the local branch of the Commercial Bank of Australia. The two storey building has many features that are identical to those of the eastern neighbouring building. The building is constructed on a rusticated base, there are two entrance doors with classically derived casements made up of plain pilasters, cornices, scrolled brackets and tympanum. A pair of arched windows are found between the doors. A deep cornice was set above the entablature, there is an open balustrade at parapet level, with piers topped with urns at each end and a raised panel buttressed by scrolls and tympanum above. In 2000, the parapet level including the urns and tympanum were removed, and the entire building was painted.

The two storey building has a symmetrical smooth rendered façade, with the lower floor finished in rendered ashlar. The paired groups of arched windows have classical pillars and prominent architraves. A number of classical motifs have been utilised to embellish the façade.

The building was built in 1890 for the Commercial Bank during the Western Australian gold rush period when prospectors would disembark at Albany then travel further north.

Plans were approved by May 1890 for construction with an estimated cost of £6000. The architect, John Talbot Hobbs, called for tenders early the following month for construction. The tender was awarded to J Hurst and son, with a bid of £6697, and they commenced construction of the building in late July of the same year. The contract also included the demolition of the existing single storey buildings on the site. Works on the building were completed in June 1891.

In 1897 the Western Australian bank had taken over the premises from the Commercial Bank.

In 2000, the Great Southern Development Commission offices were located within the building but were later moved to Pyrmont House.

Currently the building is used for office space, including by the former member of Albany and now lawyer, Kevin Prince.

== See also ==
- List of places on the State Register of Heritage Places in the City of Albany
