= Vancouver House (Albany, Western Australia) =

Heritage listed building in Albany, Western Australia

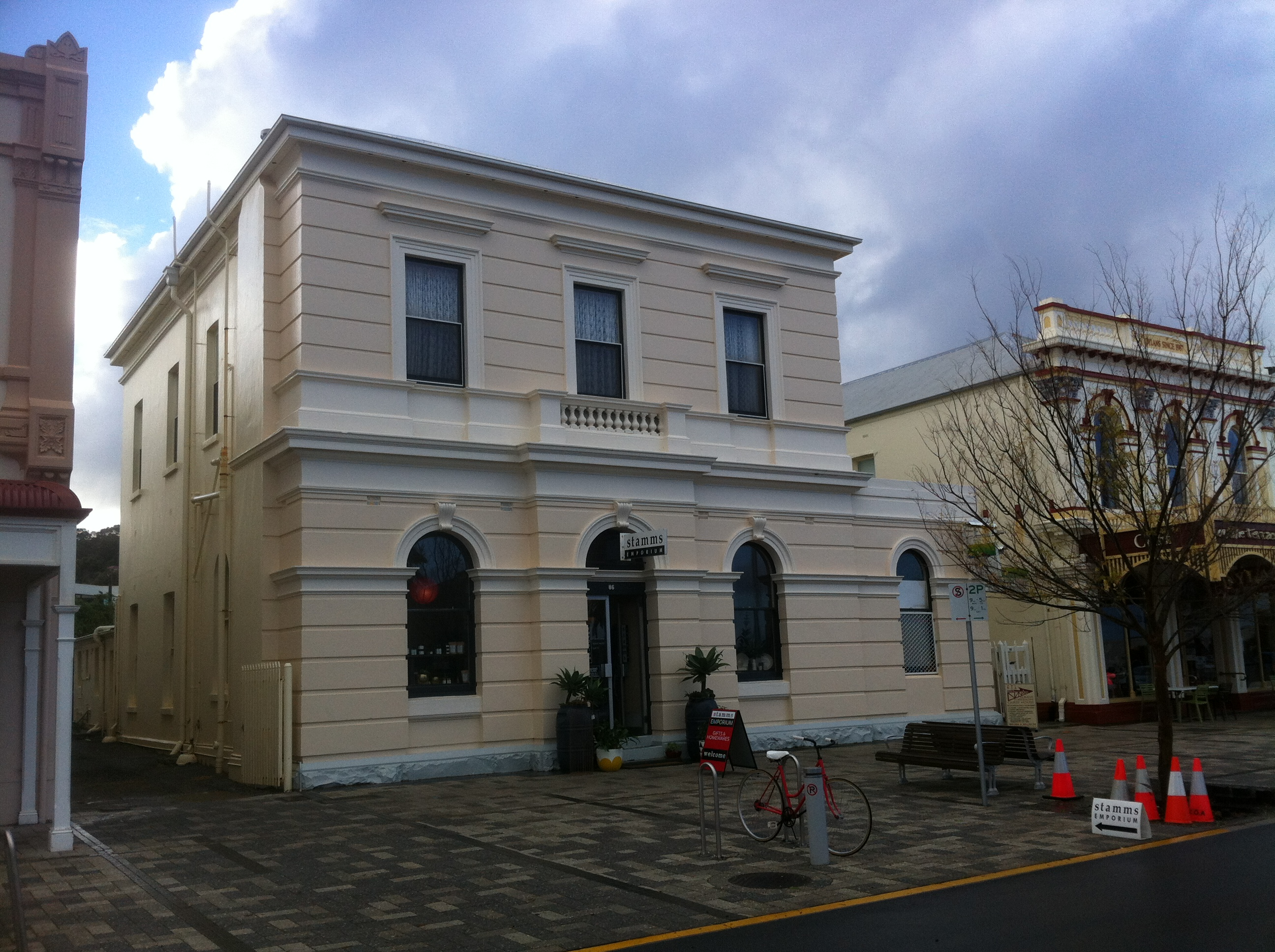
- Vancouver House on Stirling Terrace
- Interactive map of the Vancouver House area

General information
- Type: Heritage listed building
- Location: Albany, Western Australia
- Coordinates: 35.026724°S 117.88562°E

Western Australia Heritage Register
- Official name: National Bank
- Type: State Registered Place
- Designated: 7 December 2007
- Part of: Stirling Terrace Precinct, Albany (14922)
- Reference no.: 64

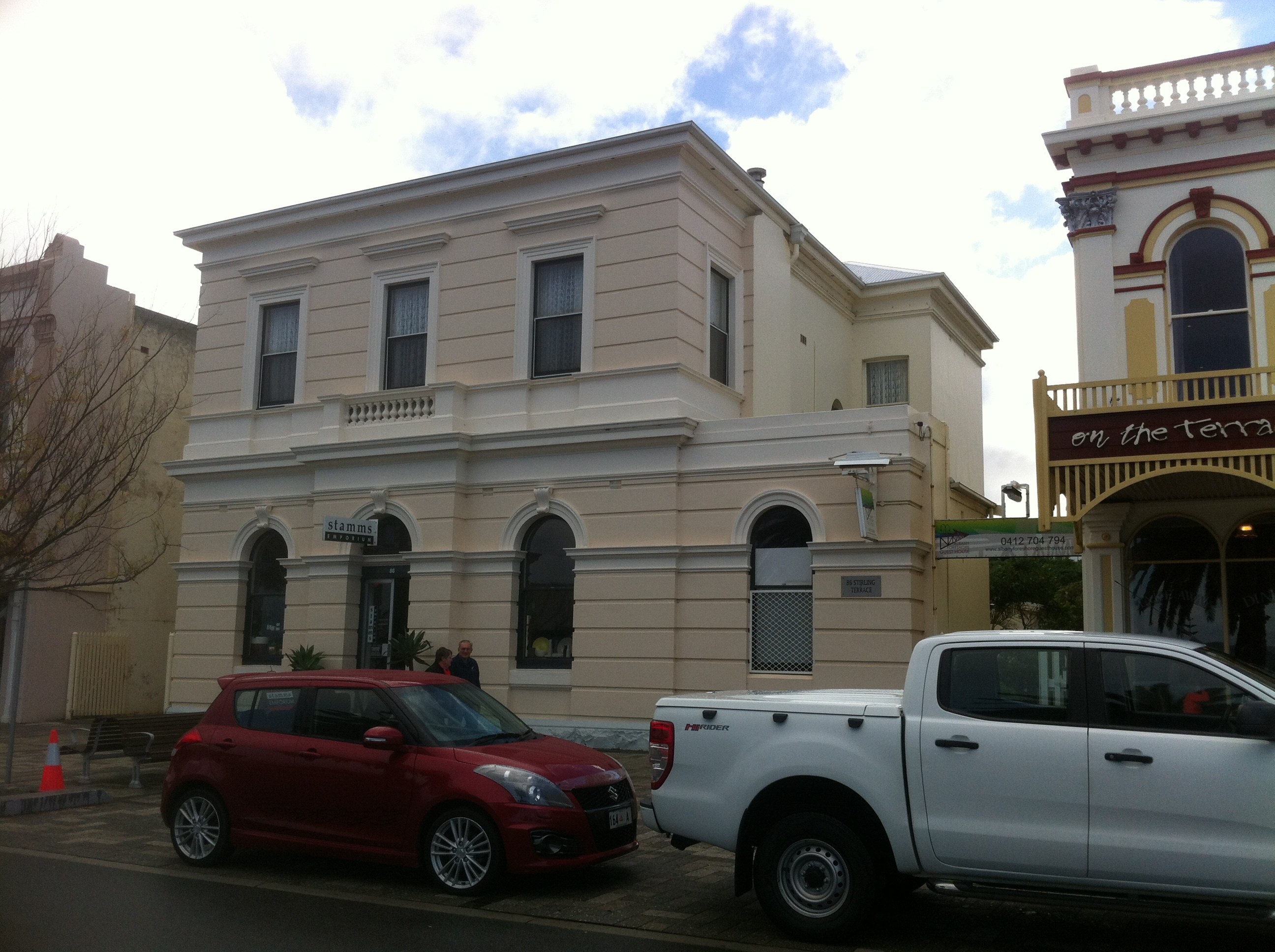
Vancouver House 2016

Vancouver House, also known as the National Bank building, is a heritage listed building located on Stirling Terrace overlooking Princess Royal Harbour in Albany in the Great Southern region of Western Australia.

The building is named after George Vancouver, who named King George Sound and Princess Royal Harbour and claimed the southern part of Western Australia for the British Crown in 1791.

Tenders were called for in February 1881, and the building was constructed in 1881 by local builder Charles Keyser, who also built Albany House located further along Stirling Terrace. It initially operated as a branch of the National Bank but later was used as a cafe and food store and became a guest house in 2000.

The building is of a Victorian free classical style and is part of a group of significant buildings along Stirling Terrace. It has two storeys with a single storey addition on the eastern side of the building. The symmetrical facade is divided into horizontal panels of stucco masonry. The portico entry bay has an arched doorway. The building is topped with a medium pitch corrugated iron roof with two moulded top chimneys.

== See also ==
- List of places on the State Register of Heritage Places in the City of Albany
