= List of mayors of Albany, Western Australia =

The City of Albany is a local government area in the Great Southern region of Western Australia. It has been led by mayors including:

1885 William Finlay, the inaugural mayor of Albany
1886 to 1888 William Grills Knight
1888 Lancel Victor de Hamel
1889 to 1890 John Moir
1891 Robert Andrew Muir
1894 to 1897 John Moir
1897 to 1899 William Grills Knight
1899 to 1907 Cuthbert McKenzie
1908 to 1912 Harry Sims
1913 to 1915 Herbert Robinson
1916 E.G. McKenzie
1917 A.F. Cuddihy
1918 to 1921 W.J.Day
1923 to 1926 Charles Wittenoom
1926 to 1931 Charles Wittenoom
1931 George William Stead
1936 to 1939 Henry John Chadwick Hanrahan
1940 to 1952 Charles Wittenoom
1953 to 1955 Denis Robinson
1985 June Hodgson
1988 to 1998 Annette Knight
1999 to 2007 Alison Goode
2007 to 2011 Milton Evans
2011 to 2023 Dennis Wellington
2023 to present Greg Stocks
