= Shire of Albany =

Former local government area in Australia

Coordinates: 35°01′22″S 117°52′53″E

Shire of Albany (former)
- Local government area
- Country: Australia
- State: Western Australia
- Region: Great Southern
- Established: 1896
- Council seat: Albany

Government
  - State electorate: Albany, Stirling
  - Federal division: Forrest

Area
  - Total: 4,280.1 km^{2} (1,652.6 sq mi)

Population
  - Total: 12,391 (1996 census)
  - Density: 2.89503/km^{2} (7.4981/sq mi)

The Shire of Albany was a local government area in the Great Southern region of Western Australia centred on (but not including) the town of Albany about 410 kilometres (255 mi) south-southeast of the capital, Perth, and covering an area of 4,280 square kilometres (1,653 sq mi).

== History ==
It was established as the Albany Road District on 10 April 1896.

A section of the district was separated to form the new Denmark Road District on 22 September 1911.

The Albany Road District was declared a shire and named the Shire of Albany with effect from 1 July 1961 following the passage of the Local Government Act 1960, which reformed all remaining road districts into shires.

It amalgamated with the Town of Albany to become the City of Albany on 1 July 1998. At the time of amalgamation, it had thirteen councillors and five wards, with Harbour Ward (five councillors) and four others (including Hassell and Millbrook) with two councillors each.
