= The Rocks, Albany =

The Rocks
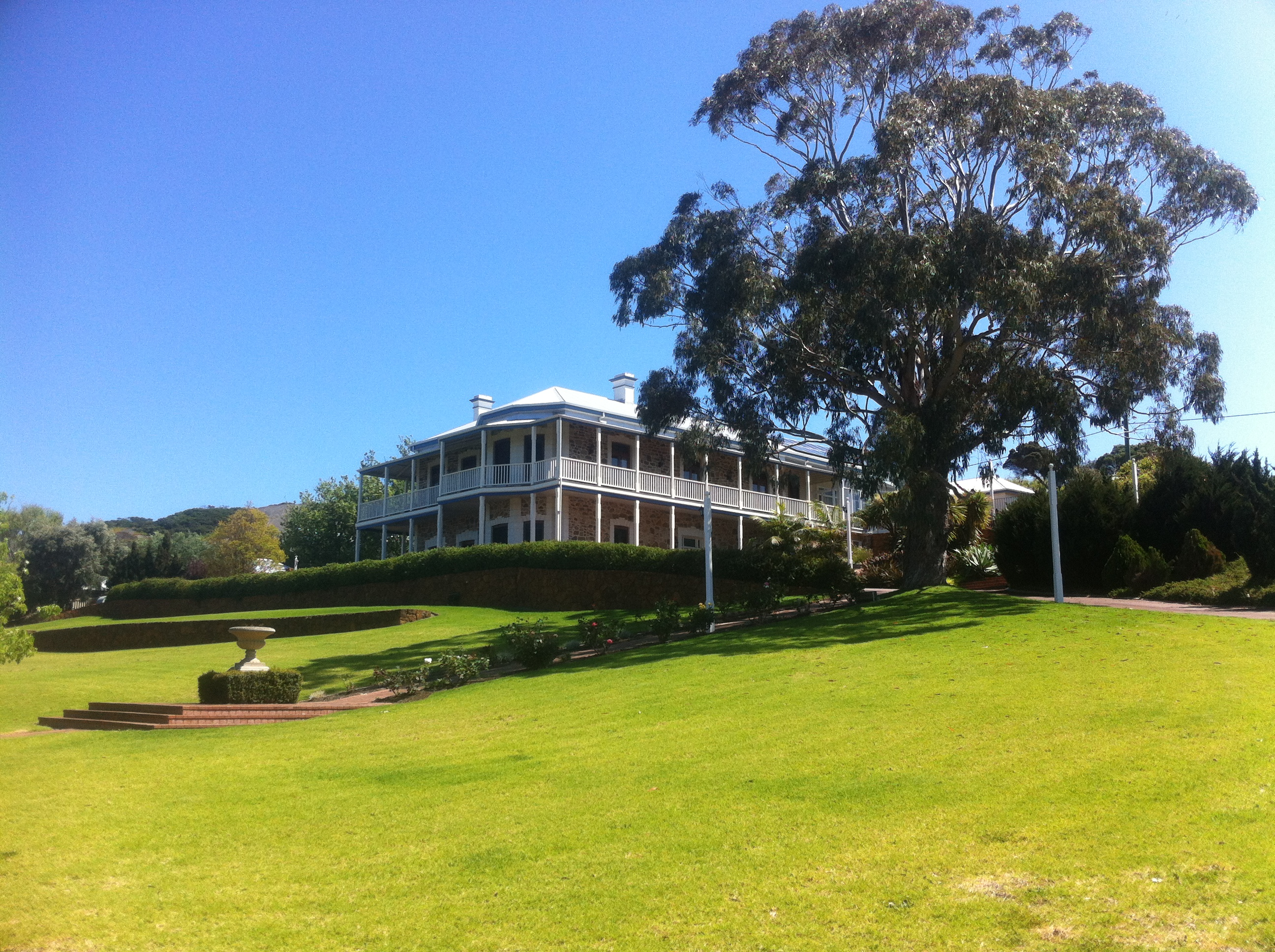
- The Rocks, view from bottom entry gate
- Interactive map of the The Rocks area

General information
- Type: Heritage listed building
- Location: Albany, Western Australia
- Coordinates: 35.02414°S 117.87717°E

Western Australia Heritage Register
- Type: State Registered Place
- Designated: 1 April 1999
- Reference no.: 28

The Rocks, also referred to as Government House or Government Cottage, is a residence in Albany in the Great Southern region of Western Australia.

The building was constructed in 1882 for William Grills Knight, a prominent local identity, and his family. Knight later served as mayor of the City of Albany from 1886 to 1888 and the family remained at the property until 1910, the last owner being his daughter, Mary Knight. The building was sold to Mr Dymes who sold to Mr Butcher in 1910, who made various improvements on the building.

The building is set on 8,196 square metres (88,221 sq ft) of manicured gardens situated on the side of Mount Melville and overlooks the town of Albany and Princess Royal Harbour.

The Government of Western Australia acquired the property in 1912 to utilize as a summer cottage for vice regal dignitaries. During World War I the house was used as a convalescent home for wounded servicemen up until 1921 when the government started using the building again for vice regal visits. By 1937 the governor no longer required the building and it then served several purposes including being used as a school, maternity and general hospital. During World War II it was once again used by returned servicemen, and became a private hospital again in 1941.

In 1944 it became a private residence and then in 1950 the building was used as a hostel for girls attending Albany Senior High School, with 30 girls taking up residence; this was later increased to 40. The Country Women's Association were managing the enterprise.

The building was classified by the National Trust in 1977, and placed on the register of the National Estate in 1980. In the early 1990s it was once again briefly used as a hospital.

The property is used as tourist accommodation and is the only five star heritage accommodation in Western Australia. The house is important as an example of the restrained architecture typical of Albany and of a large house of the period. It has a federation filigree style with seven bedroom, eight bathrooms, billiard room, library with Victorian styling and jarrah floorboards.

In 2005 the building received a A$50,000 grant from the state government to assist with the cost of conservation work including the replacement of the aluminium windows and doors with jarrah frames.

== See also ==
- List of places on the State Register of Heritage Places in the City of Albany
