= McKenzie House, Albany =

Coordinates: 35.024512°S 117.87576°E

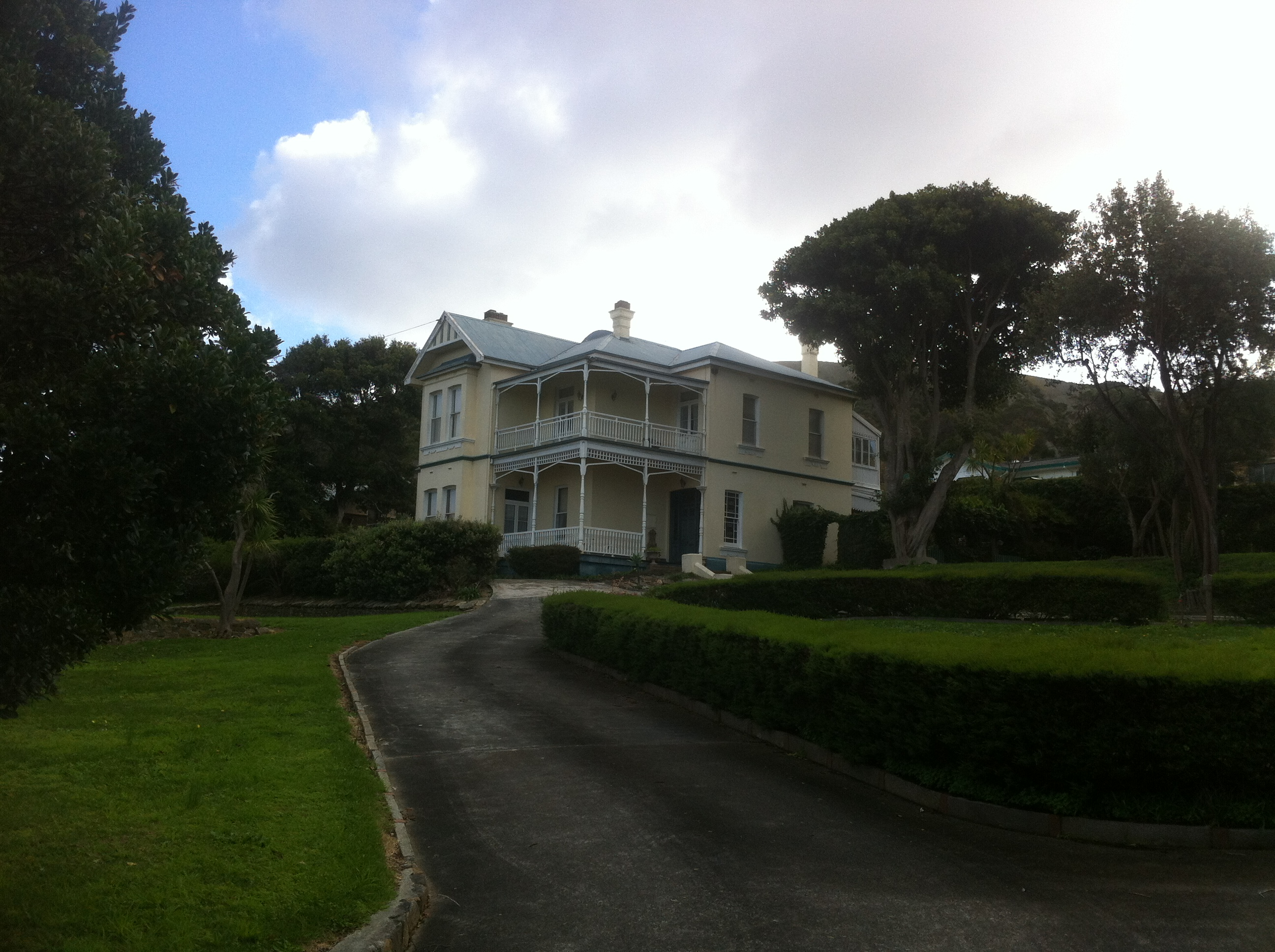
McKenzie House from Grey St

McKenzie House, also referred to as the White House, is a residence in Albany in the Great Southern region of Western Australia.

The five bedroom, two bathroom home set on 3,000 square metres (0.741 acres) of grounds has sweeping views of Princess Royal Harbour. It was on the market in 2016 for A$2.5 million.

Built in the 1880s, the two storey heritage listed house is an example of a large Federation Queen Anne style residence. The building is rendered and painted stone and brick with a corrugated iron roof, which is multi hipped and has three chimneys. A projecting wing has two protruding timber framed sash windows at each level; windows have decorative sills and moulding with a prominent timbered gable with timber infill. Both levels have verandahs with timber balustrading.

The building was home to William Finlay, the first mayor of Albany. Later several generations of the McKenzie family, prominent local shipping magnates, also owned and lived in the residence.

== See also ==
- List of places on the State Register of Heritage Places in the City of Albany
