= Albany Courthouse =

Courthouse in Albany, Western Australia

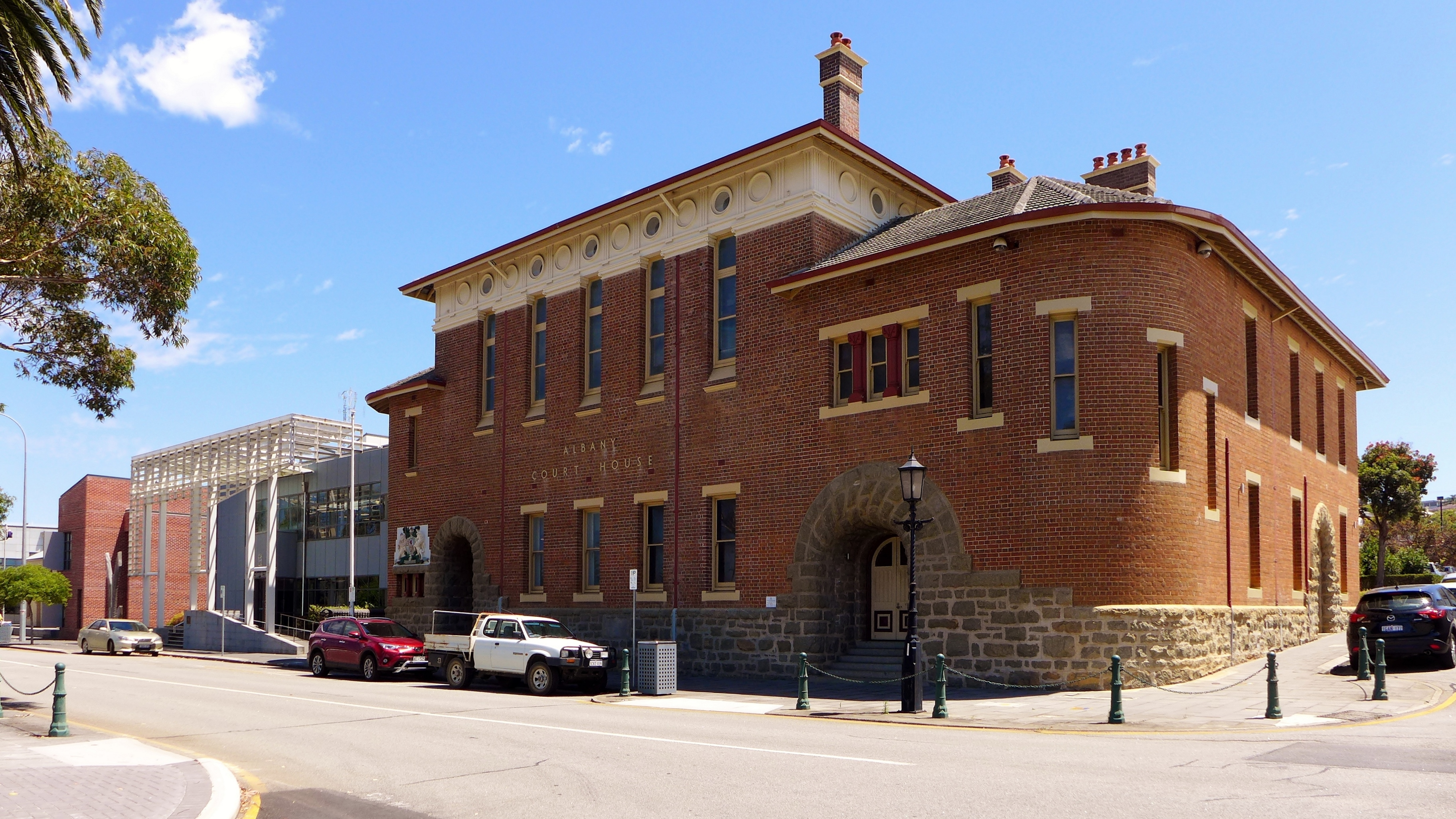

General information
- Location: 184 Stirling Terrace, Albany
- Coordinates: 35.02705°S 117.8823°E
- Construction started: 1896
- Completed: 1898

Design and construction
- Architect: George Temple Poole
- Main contractor: Charles Layton

Western Australia Heritage Register
- Official name: Albany Court House Complex
- Type: State Registered Place
- Designated: 14 February 2003
- Reference no.: 51

References
- Heritage Council of Western Australia

The Albany Courthouse is found in the Albany Courthouse Complex, also known as the Albany Justice Complex, which is a series of buildings situated on Stirling Terrace and Collie Streets in Albany in the Great Southern region of Western Australia.

Heritage buildings found on the site include the Albany Courthouse, Gaolkeepers House and Residence 1845.

The courthouse was designed by George Temple-Poole and built by Charles Layton. It was decided to build the courthouse on the site of the old state school, which had to be demolished. Building commenced in 1896 with the laying of the foundation stone on 29 December 1896 by Frederick Piesse. The building was to take nine months to complete but was delayed in 1897 when the supply of bricks was exhausted. Construction was completed on 7 February 1898 and the building was opened the acting Premier, Edward Wittenoom. It is a two storey building made from granite and red brick with rounded front corners and granite arched convolute doorways. The roof is covered with grey tiles with brick chimneys which have terracotta tops. The building initially also contained a police station and later for offices for the Public Works Department.

The court was the most expensive of the regional courts built during the gold boom, only Geraldton and Coolgardie courts, that were combined with other Government offices, having grander buildings. Even the courts in Perth had to wait until 1903 to outshine the Albany building when the Supreme Court building was completed.

In 1908 a lockup and keeper's residence were constructed behind the court; in 1920 an internal wall was removed on the ground floor between offices for batter access for the clerk of courts. A garage and wood shed were added in 1945 and the building was connected to the town sewer system in 1957.

Following the construction of a new police station in 1966 the police offices were taken over by the bailiff. A major renovation was carried out in 1978 with a second court room being added and the offices being redesigned.

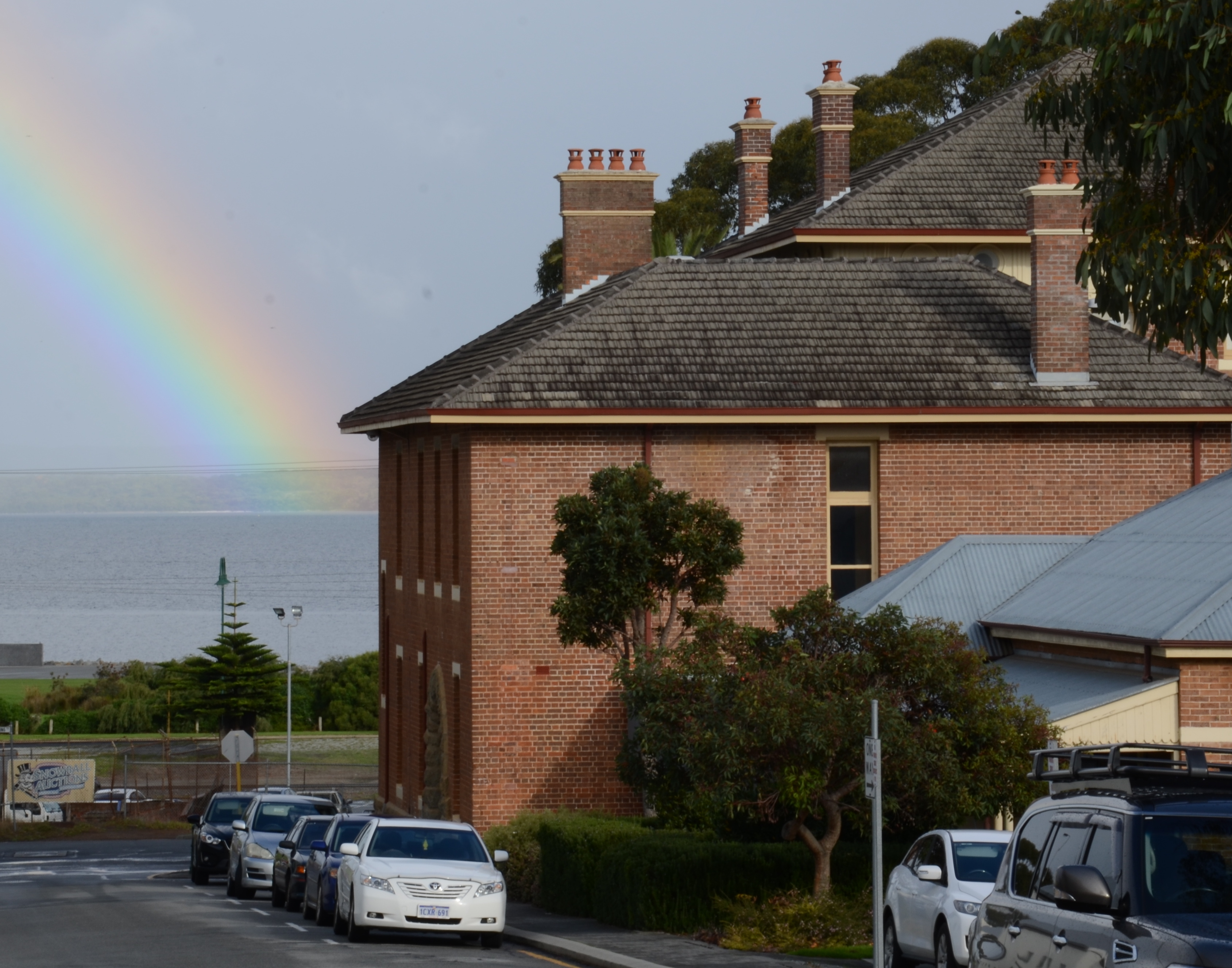
From the rear - the building in 2016

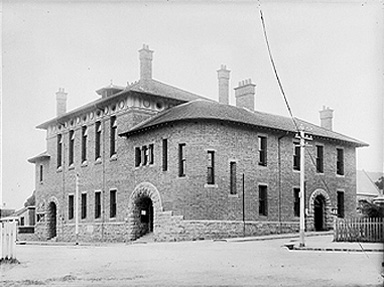
Albany Courthouse early 1900s

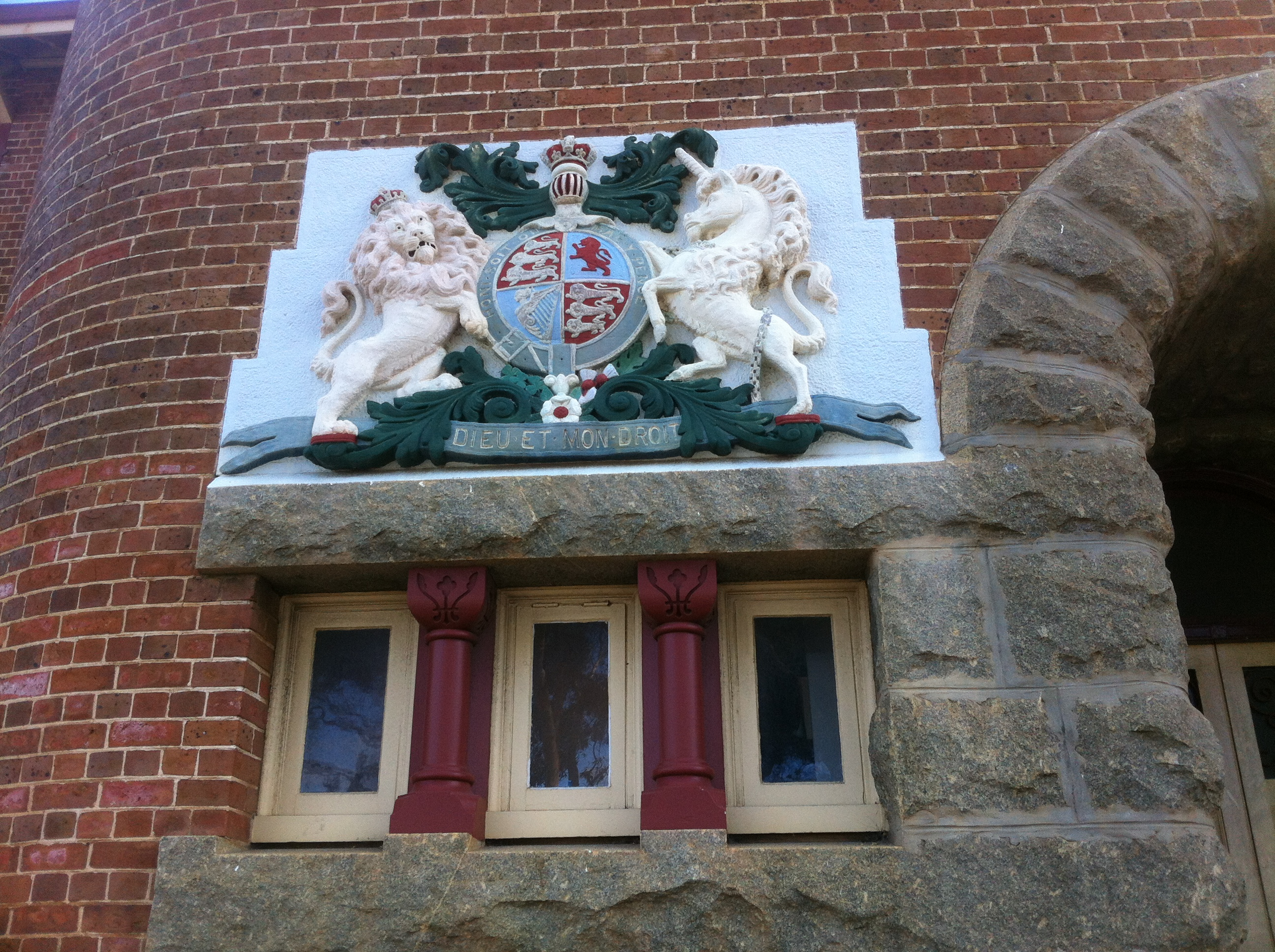
Royal coat of arms and Dieu et mon droit motto near entrance

== See also ==
- List of places on the State Register of Heritage Places in the City of Albany
