= Alexander Moir (settler) =

Australian politician

Alexander Moir (1 April 1826 – 7 January 1893) was an early settler in the Great Southern region of Western Australia.

== Life ==
Moir was born in Angus in Scotland in 1826 and arrived in Western Australia with his parents aboard the Dido from South Australia in 1850. He worked on a property at Cape Riche with his uncle George Cheyne and then moved to Albany to further expand Cheyne's business interests as a builder and merchant.

By the 1860s Moir held large tracts of grazing land around Frankland and Kojonup. In 1864 he opened a store in Albany and had various other business interests. In 1882 Glasgow House and Edinburgh House on Stirling Terrace in Albany were built for Moir. He used Glasgow House as the headquarters for his business interests. He became a municipal councillor in 1884 and eventually handed over all of his business interests to his son John Moir, who later became Mayor of Albany.
