= Empire Buildings =

Group of heritage buildings in Albany, Western Australia

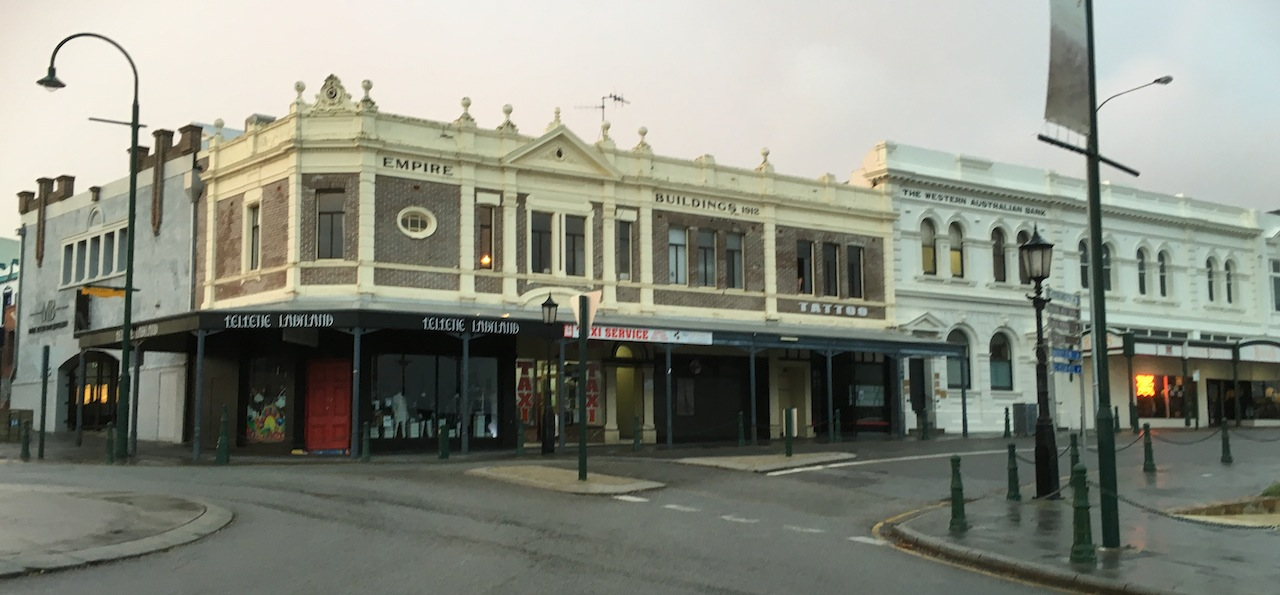
- Empire Building on the corner of York Street and Stirling Terrace
- Interactive map of the Empire Buildings area

General information
- Type: Heritage listed buildings
- Location: Albany, Western Australia
- Coordinates: 35.02672°S 117.88394°E

Western Australia Heritage Register
- Type: State Registered Place
- Designated: 7 December 2007
- Part of: Stirling Terrace Precinct, Albany (14922)
- Reference no.: 77

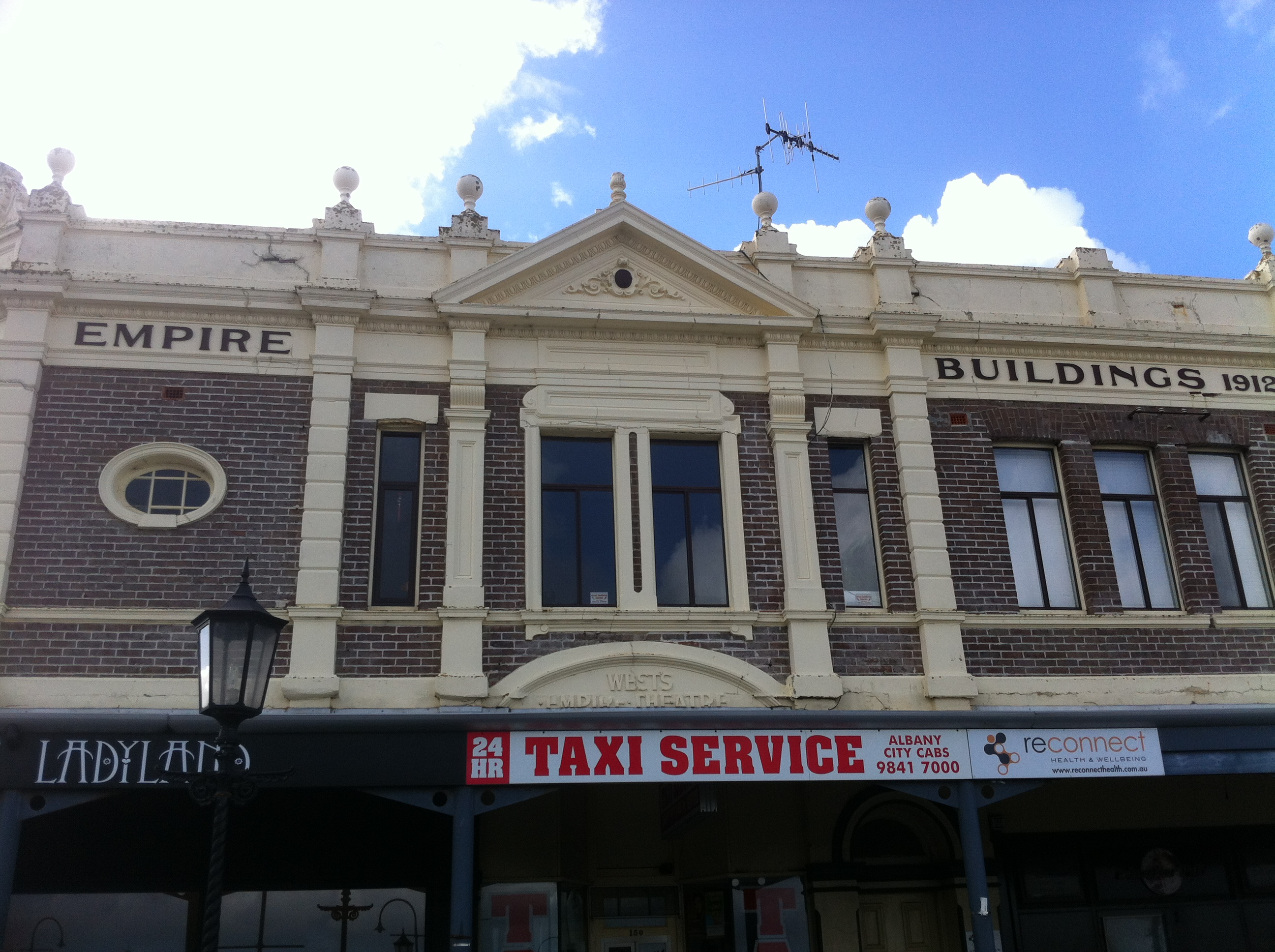
Empire Building facade in detail.

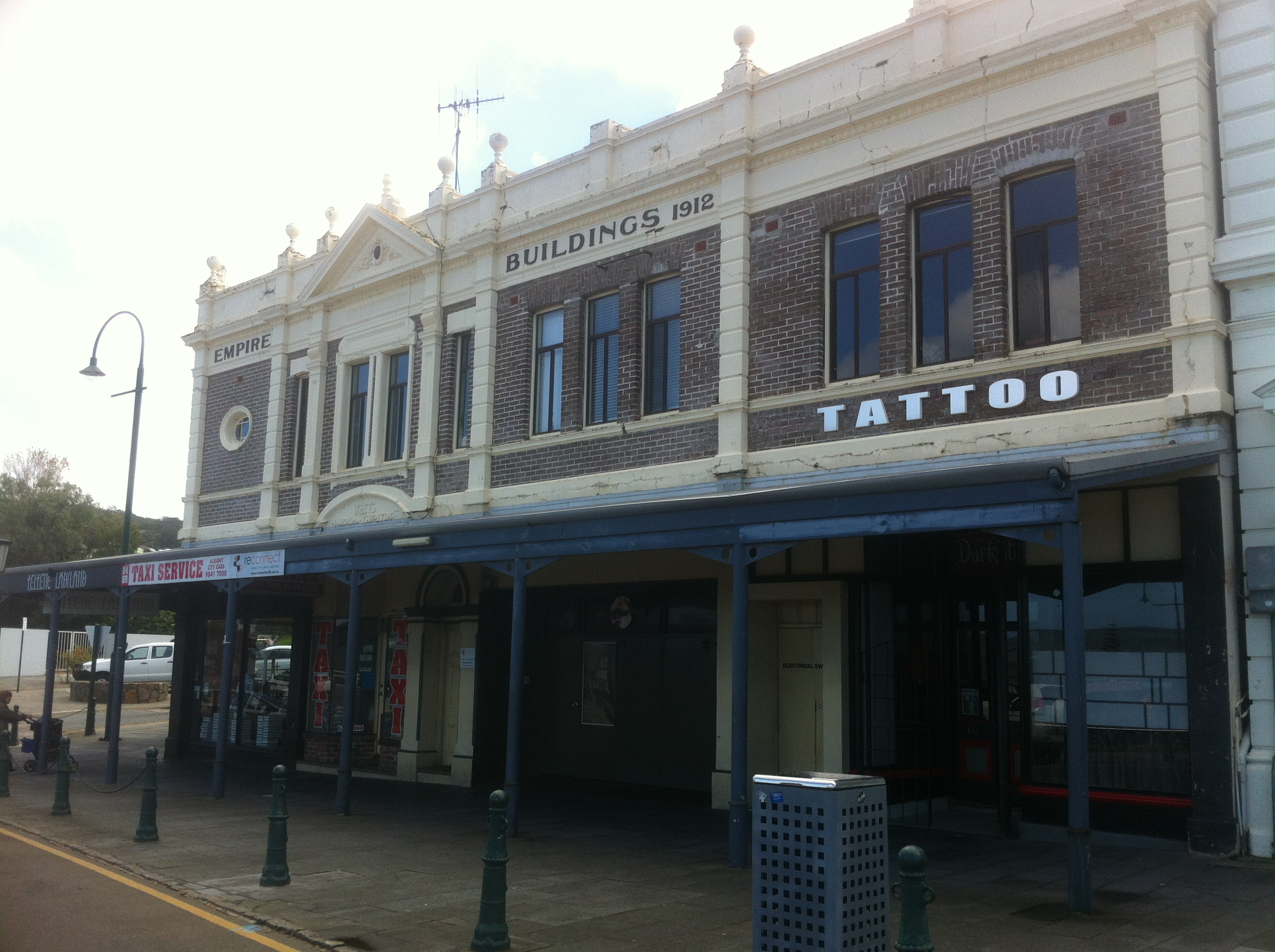
Empire Buildings facade from Stirling Terrace.

The Empire Buildings, also often referred to as the Empire Building, are a group of heritage listed buildings on the corner of Stirling Terrace and York Street overlooking Princess Royal Harbour in Albany in the Great Southern region of Western Australia.

== History ==
The buildings were constructed in 1912, and once comprised a group of shops and a cinema. The buildings have elements of Federation Free Style architectural design such as asymmetry and use of two contrasting building materials of brick and cement render.

Replacing a single storied bungalow structure that faced York Street, the Empire theatre was designed by architect Tom Anthoness and was built by J. Ashman and Warner. Initially the building held a theatre and shops. The theatre was able to hold 1,000 people. The theatre cost £5,000 and was owned and operated by West's Picture Company. It boasted refreshment stalls, a winter garden for ladies and a spacious dress circle.

Features of the two storey building include a corner entrance, asymmetrical facade, parapet wall concealing roof, informal groupings of windows, gabled pediment and decorative skyline features.

In 2000 a portion of the building was converted to a nightclub. It was closed for some time and reopened to include a bar on the ground floor in 2006.

== See also ==
- List of places on the State Register of Heritage Places in the City of Albany
