= Stirling Terrace, Albany =

Street in Albany, Western Australia

Coordinates: 35.0273°S 117.8875°E

Stirling Terrace, Albany Western Australia
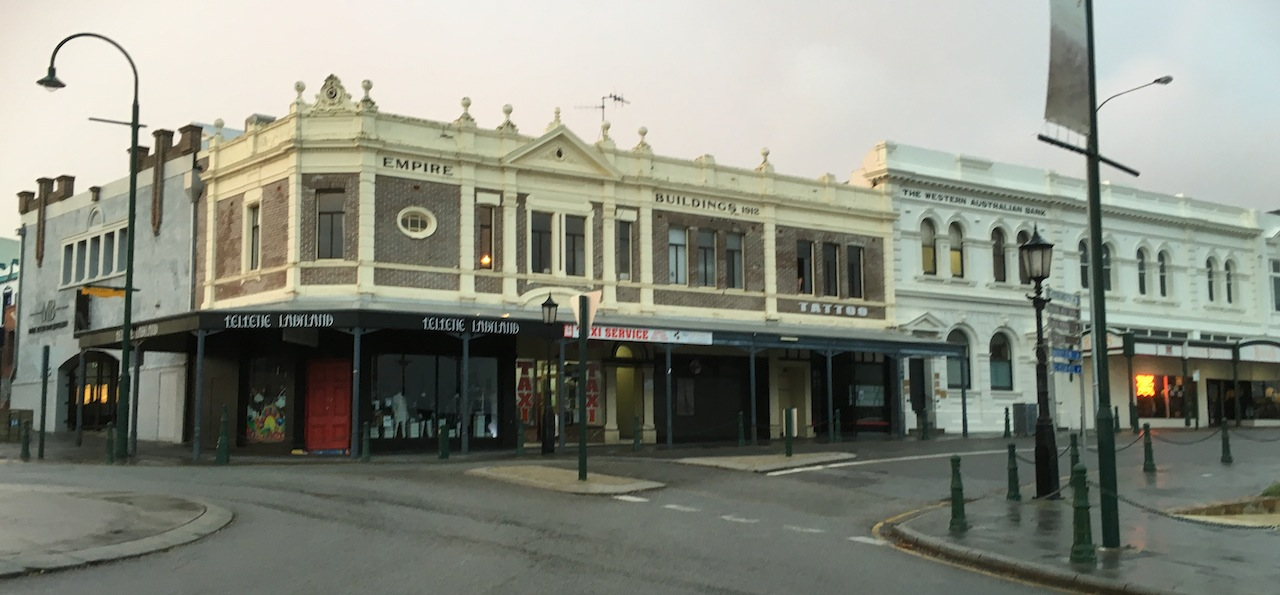
- Corner of York Street and Stirling Terrace in 2016

General information
- Type: Street
- Length: 900 m (0.6 mi)
- Route number(s): Tourist Drive 257

Major junctions
- West end: Festing Street; Residency Road (Tourist Drive 257)
- York Street; Spencer Street
- East end: Brunswick Road (Tourist Drive 257)

Location(s)
- Major suburbs: Albany

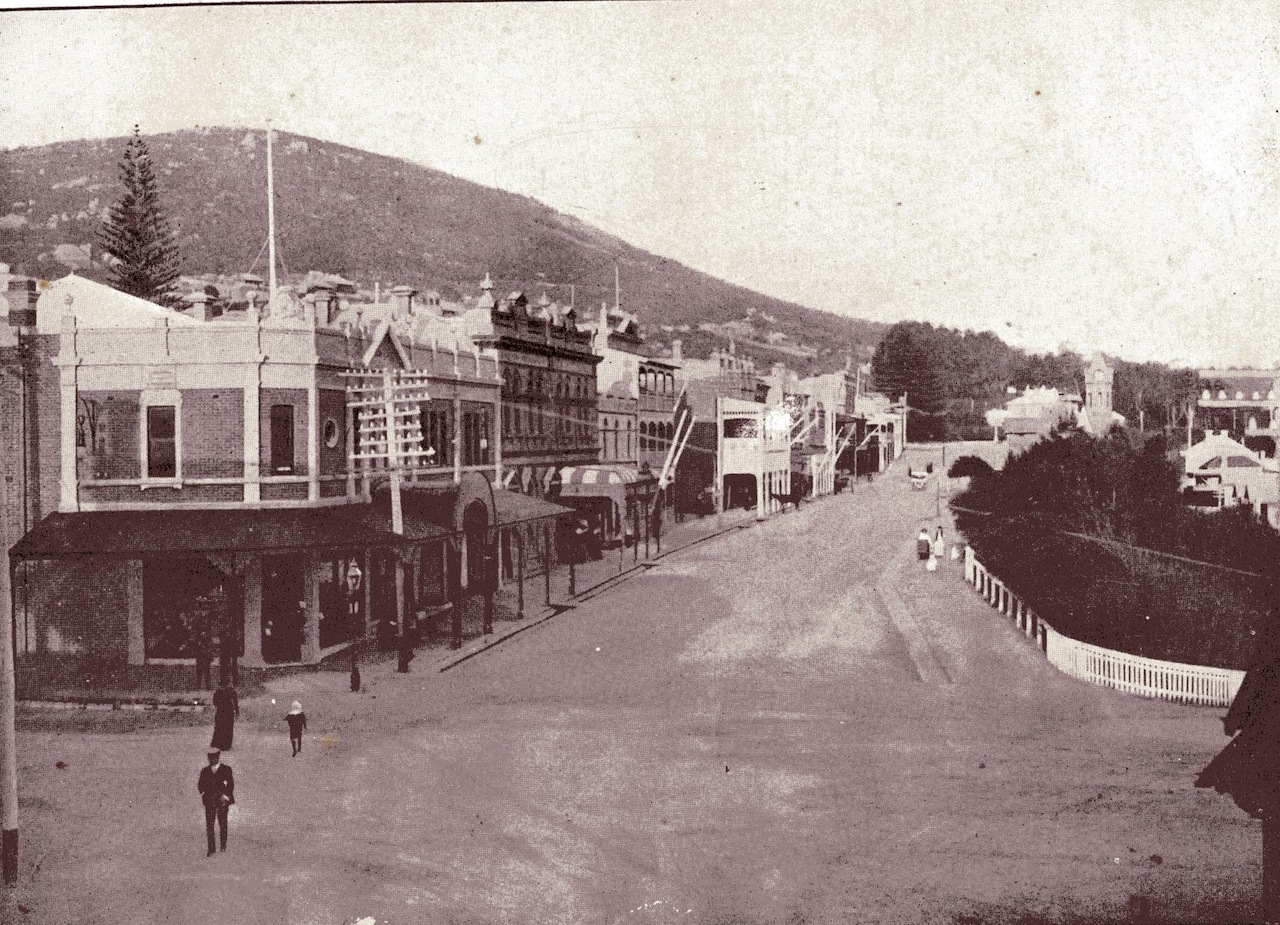
Stirling Terrace looking east in 1912, from "Alluring Albany"

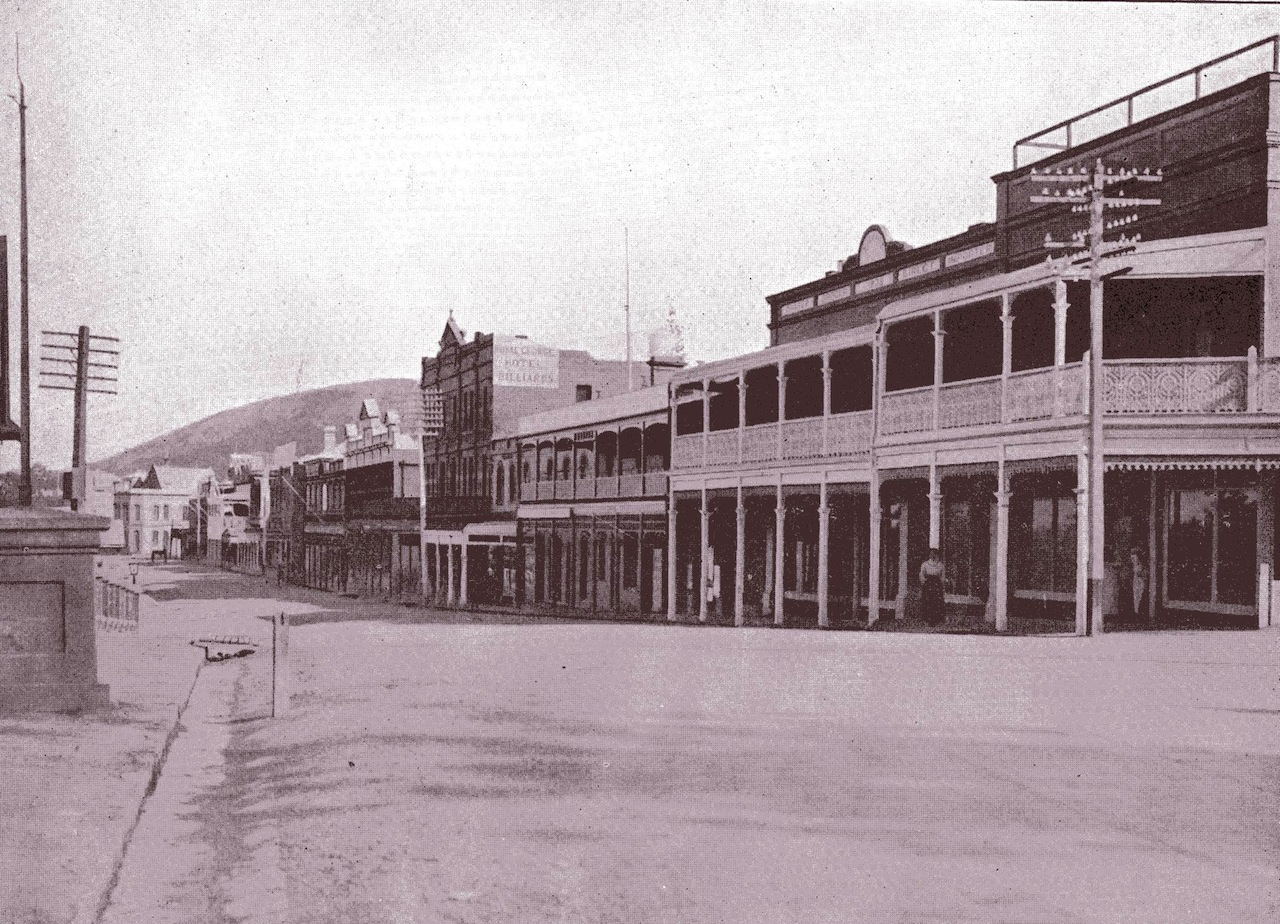
Stirling Terrace looking west in 1912, from "Alluring Albany"

Stirling Terrace, Albany is a street in the centre of Albany, Western Australia adjoining York Street.

As a historic street and part of a historic precinct it has a number of listed heritage buildings that look out over the Albany Harbour, including Argyle House.

Stirling Terrace has appeared on maps of the town since 1834 and is named after James Stirling, the first Governor of Western Australia.

The 1835 Hillman survey plan established the road as the prime location in the town, with a variety of social, commercial, leisure, institutional and service functions. The town jetty and railway station both had frontage along Stirling Terrace making it a transport hub of the town. The Empire theatre was also built along Stirling Terrace.

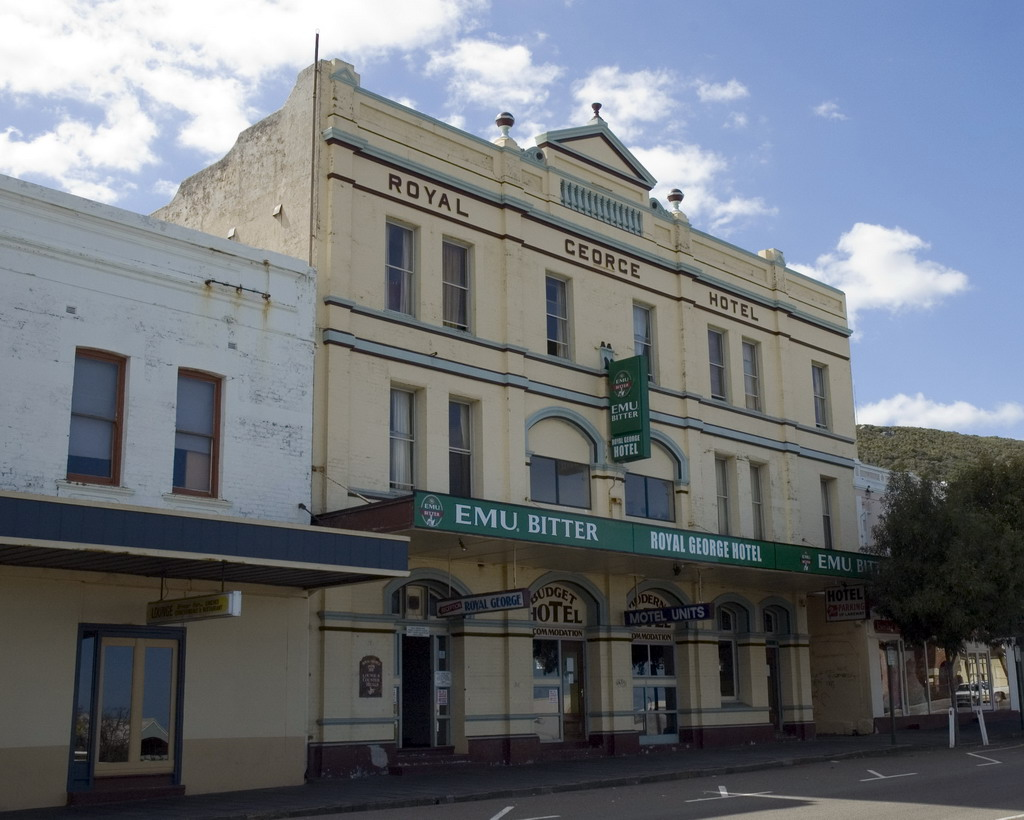
Royal George Hotel in 2006

During the 1870s and 1880s much of the frontage along Stirling Terrace to the east of York Street was filled. John Moir built a store, the Argyll buildings were erected, and a branch of the National Bank (known as Vancouver House) was constructed in 1881. Alexander Moir established Glasgow House and Edinburgh House in 1882, the Union Bank of Australia building (known as Albany House) was built in 1884, followed by the Royal George Hotel in 1885 and then the White Star Hotel. The Commercial Bank building, later a branch of the Western Australian Bank, was built in 1891.

The 1897 development of Jubilee Gardens along the slope between the upper and lower terrace made the area created a recreational centre for the area. The Jubilee Bandstand, found within the gardens, was opened in 1898.

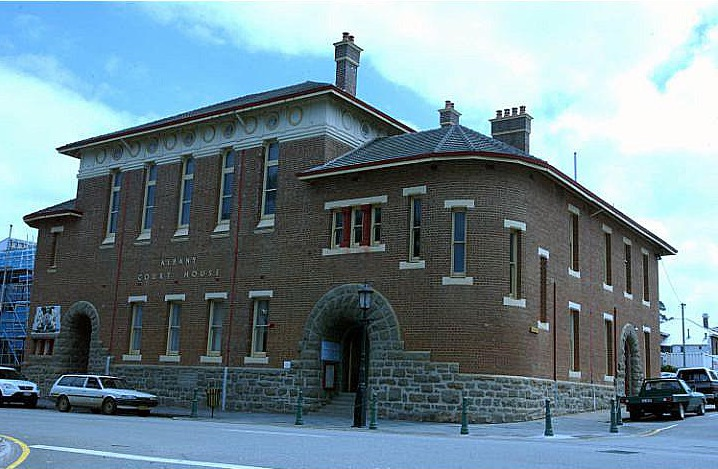
Albany Courthouse

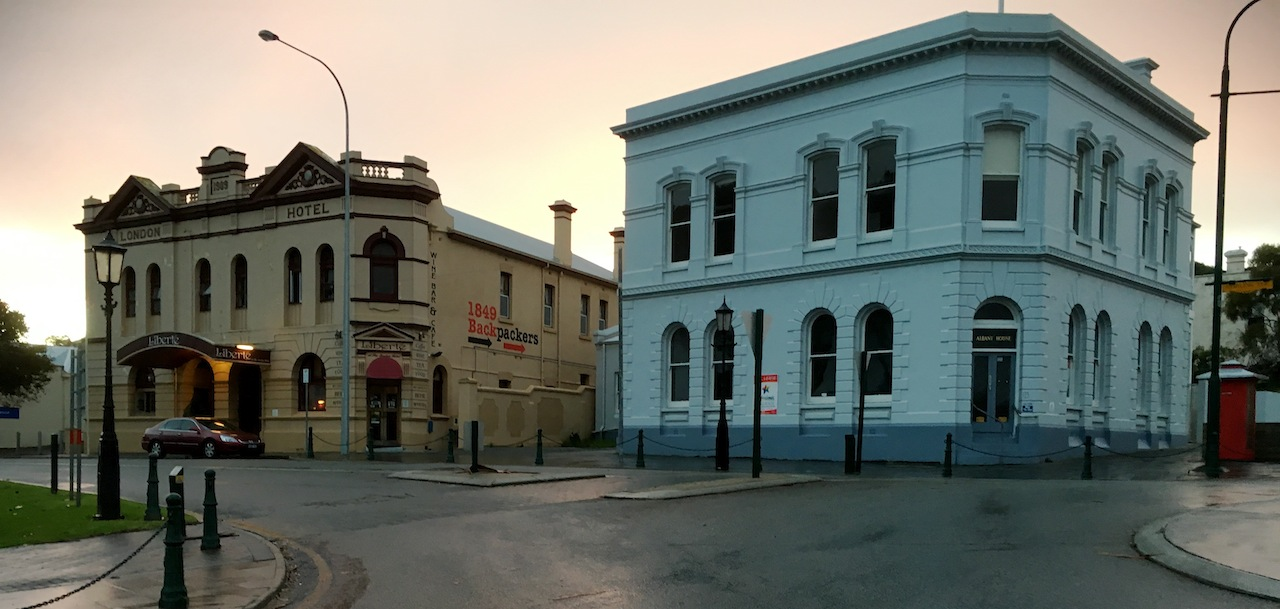
London Hotel on the left and Albany House on the right

It was the main street of early Albany and by 1900 four hotels, three banks, three department stores, shipping agencies as well as numerous other small businesses were found along the Terrace.

The laying of the foundation stone for the Albany Courthouse was held in 1896, with the building completed and opened in 1898.

The London Hotel was built along Stirling Terrace in 1909. It was built on the site of the Chusan Hotel which had stood on the site since 1849 and was rebuilt in 1871.

The Empire Buildings were constructed on the corner of Stirling Terrace and York Street in 1912, comprising a 1,000-seat theatre and shops.

To the west of the intersection with York Street is the Albany Courthouse. To the east of the intersection, there are a number of heritage properties including the Jubilee Bandstand and Albany Post Office on the southern side of the terrace and the White Star Hotel on the northern side.

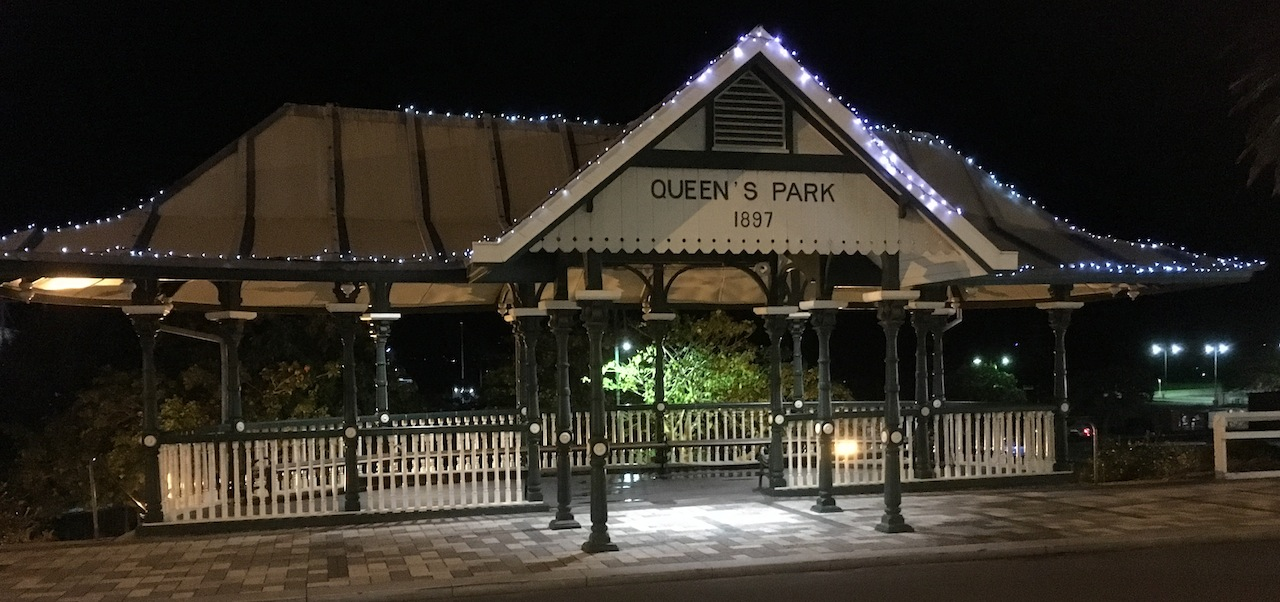
Jubilee Bandstand on Stirling Terrace at night in 2016

Like York Street, it was frequently photographed as streetscape representative of the prosperity of the town.

== Major intersections ==
LGA	Location	km	mi	Destinations	Notes
Albany	Albany	0.0	0.0	Residency Road (Tourist Drive 257) – Frenchman Bay, Mount Melville	Western terminus. Tourist Drive 257 western concurrency terminus Continues westwards as Festing Street
Albany	Albany	0.15	0.093	Collie Street	
Albany	Albany	0.30	0.19	York Street – Perth	Roundabout
Albany	Albany	0.60	0.37	Spencer Street	
Albany	Albany	0.90	0.56	Bridges Street – Mount Clarence	Eastern terminus at t-junction. Continues eastwards as Brunswick Road (Tourist Drive 257)
1.000 mi = 1.609 km; 1.000 km = 0.621 mi: Route transition

== See also ==
- List of places on the State Register of Heritage Places in the City of Albany
