= Pyrmont, Albany =

Heritage house in Albany, Western Australia

Pyrmont
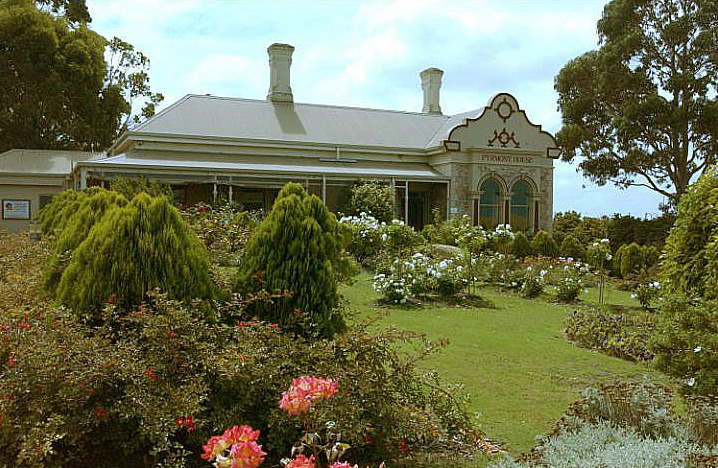
- Interactive map of the Pyrmont area
- Former names: Pyrmont House, Great Southern Development Commission

General information
- Architectural style: Cape Dutch style
- Location: 110 Serpentine Road, Albany
- Coordinates: 35.0216°S 117.8820°E
- Completed: 1858

Western Australia Heritage Register
- Type: State Registered Place
- Designated: 30 August 2002
- Reference no.: 44

References
- Heritage Council of Western Australia

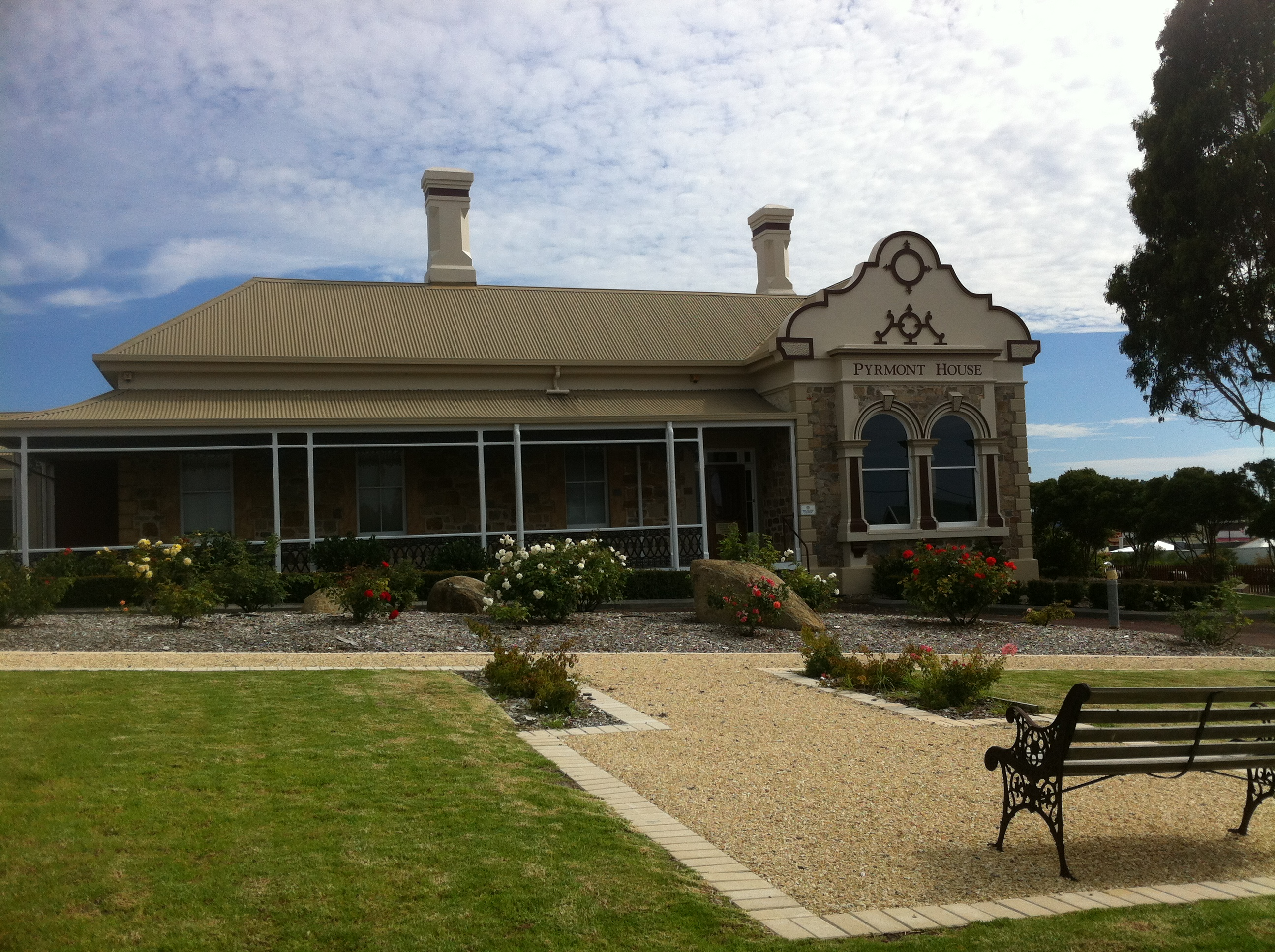
Pyrmont House front view

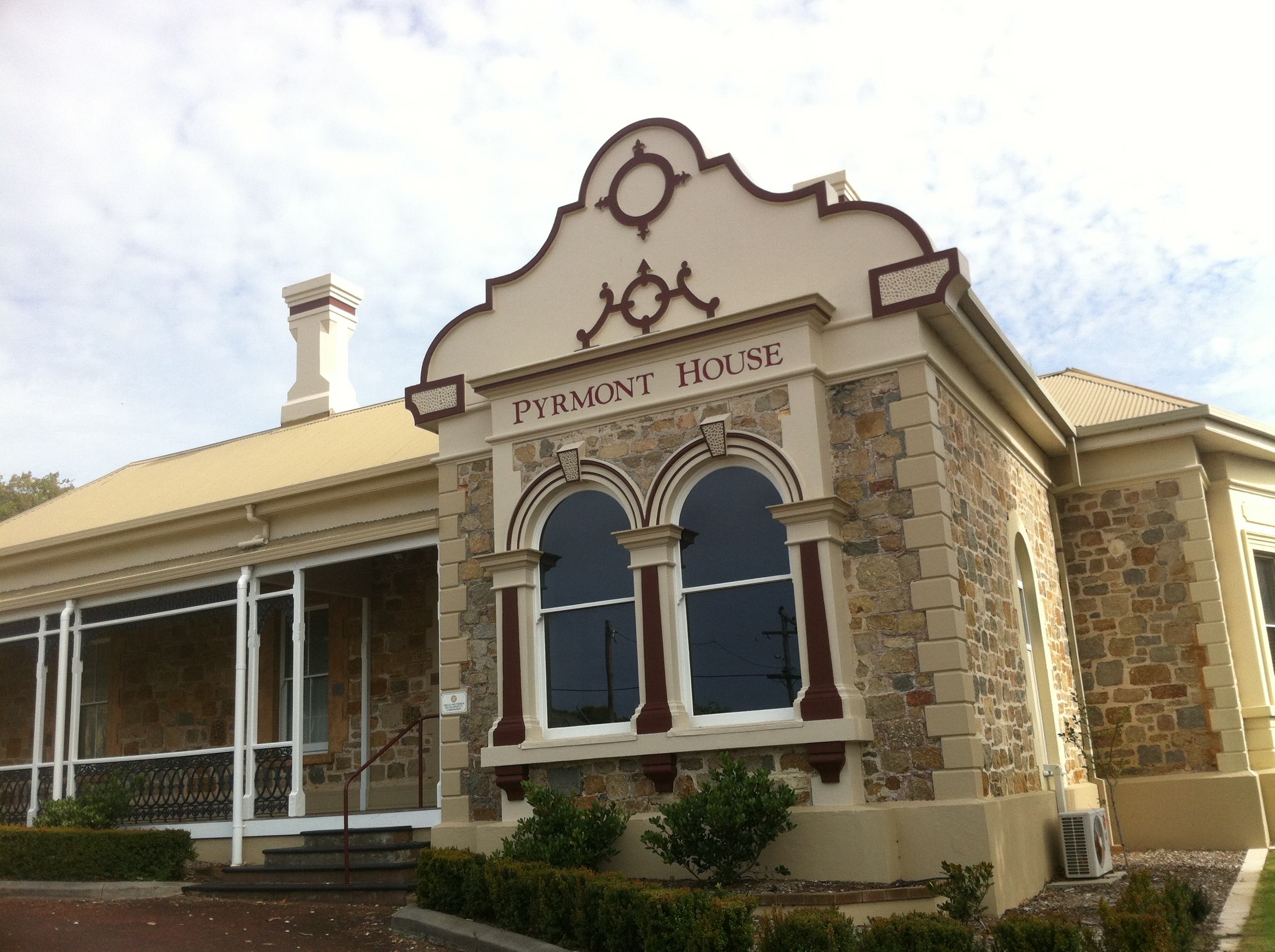
Pyrmont main facade

Pyrmont, also referred to as Pyrmont House, is a residence located on Serpentine Road in Albany in the Great Southern region of Western Australia. It is one of the oldest buildings in Albany.

== Description ==
It is built of granite and has nine bedrooms and outbuildings. The projecting wings have distinctive curvilinear parapeted gable and bay windows. The roof is made from hipped corrugated iron and topped with rendered brick decorative chimneys. Enclosed in a verandah the building is set on 3,400 square metres (0.840 acres) of low manicured gardens. Pyrmont is based on the South African Cape Dutch Colonial architectural design.

== History ==
The building was established in 1858. The name Pyrmont is taken from the small principality in Prussia where Princess Helena of Waldeck and Pyrmont (the wife of Prince Leopold, Duke of Albany) was from.

Originally constructed as a home for local businessman and representative of P&O Shipping line, Thomas Meadows Gillam, it was later occupied by his son, William. In 1887 the property was purchased by Robert Andrew Muir, who later became Mayor of Albany.

By 1898 the building was being used as a school house by Ms McPherson, who was the principal, and in 1904 was the home of a dress making business. Late the same year the place was for sale.

George Hill acquired the property in 1911 for an estimated £2000 and then 24 hours later sold it to Edward Barnett, apart from a small part of the property which was kept for future development.

Following Barnett's death in 1952 the property was placed on the market, and sold to the Country Women's Association in 1953. The CWA opened Pyrmont as a club facility early the following year. Later they also acquired the adjoining block, which once held tennis courts, and used the area to build their hall. During this time the building was used as a boarding house for young teachers and the grounds used by primary school children as a play area. By 1966 the CWA could no long afford the upkeep and Pyrmont was sold to a local car dealership, Barnesby motors, which used it as a bulk spare parts store. Over a decade later the building was so dilapidated it was mooted for demolition but community opposition prevailed and the building was eventually sold to Robert and Lucy Winlow in 1981. The Winlows restored the building and it was later converted to a reception centre and restaurant by Nilla and John Spark in 1994.

The building was classified by the National Trust in 1977, and listed on the State Register of Heritage Places in 2002.

The Great Southern Development Commission currently occupies the building with offices for 13 staff.

== See also ==
- List of places on the State Register of Heritage Places in the City of Albany
