= Robert Andrew Muir =

Australian politician

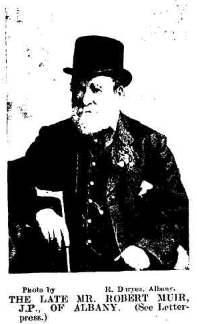
Robert Muir

Robert Andrew Muir (20 June 1821 – 18 August 1904) was a merchant and politician who served as the mayor of Albany, Western Australia.

Muir was born in Fife, Scotland on 20 June 1821; his family emigrated to Western Australia when he was a young boy. Arriving aboard Ganges on Fremantle in 1844 the family moved to Cape Riche shortly afterward. The family later took up land along the Hay River but eventually settled at the property Forest Hill near Mount Barker.

The family soon expanded their business interests and set up as merchants in Albany. The business, named A. Muir and Sons, prospered and Robert Muir took over in 1884. The family also pioneered the Eucla region setting up a sheep station in the area. In 1887 Muir purchased Pyrmont, a now heritage listed building, as his Albany residence.

He entered local politics and served as chairman of the municipal council from when it was first declared in 1871. Contesting the first mayoral election in 1885 Muir lost to William Finlay. In 1891 Muir was elected Mayor of Albany but retired at the end of his year's term due to ill health. One of his last acts was to lay the foundation stone for Oddfellow's Hall, built for the institution of which he was an honorary member.

After retiring but remaining in the district Muir died after a short illness on 18 August 1904 in Albany at an age of 83 years, and was buried at Memorial Park Cemetery.

Muir had six children; the youngest, J.W. Muir, served two terms as Mayor of Albany in 1902 and 1903.

== See also ==
- List of mayors of Albany, Western Australia
