= London Hotel, Albany =

Heritage listed hotel building in Albany, Western Australia

London Hotel
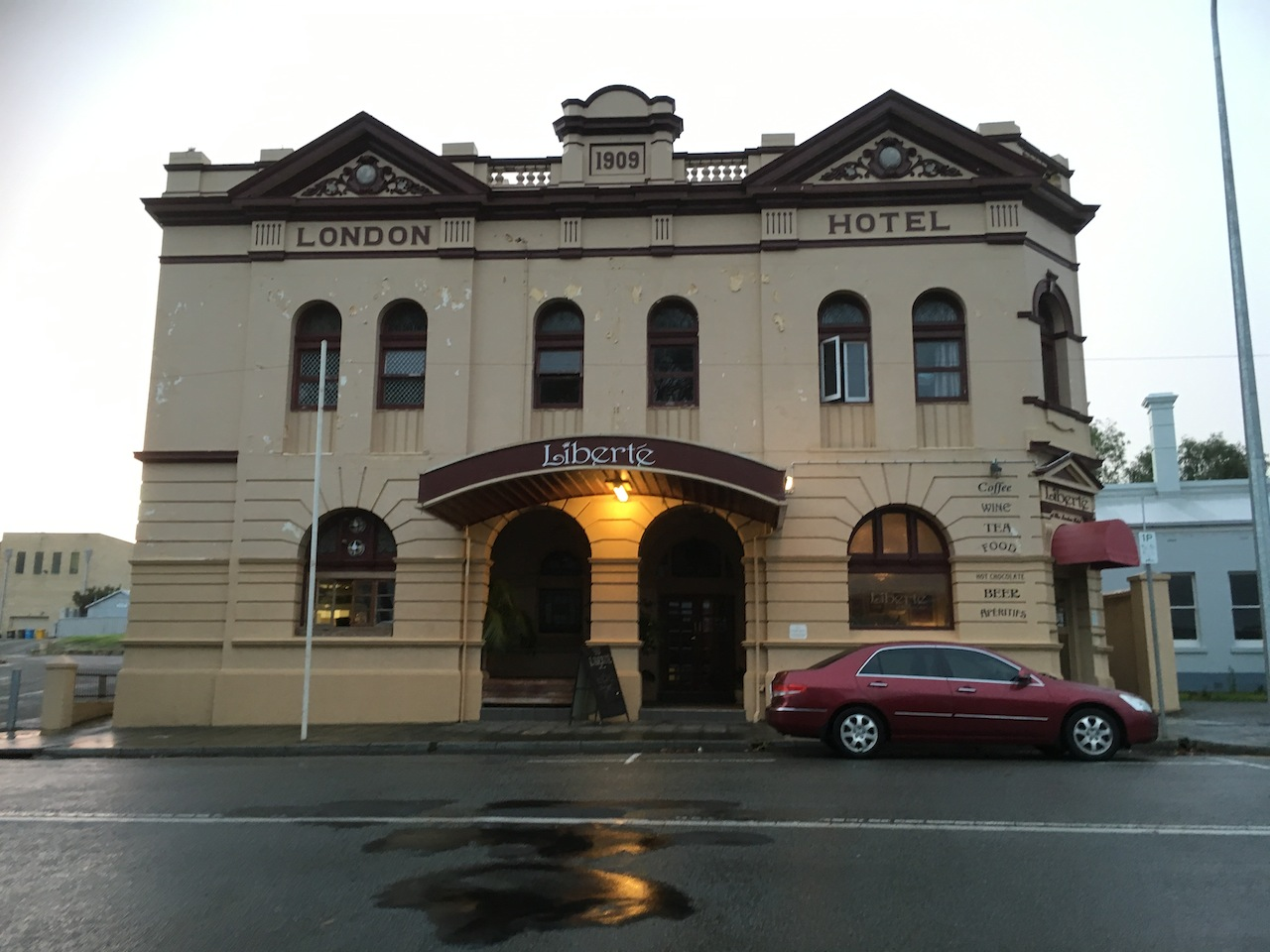
- London Hotel Albany from south

General information
- Type: Heritage listed building
- Location: Albany, Western Australia
- Coordinates: 35.0268°S 117.8831°E

Western Australia Heritage Register
- Type: State Registered Place
- Designated: 7 December 2007
- Part of: Stirling Terrace Precinct, Albany (14922)
- Reference no.: 3339

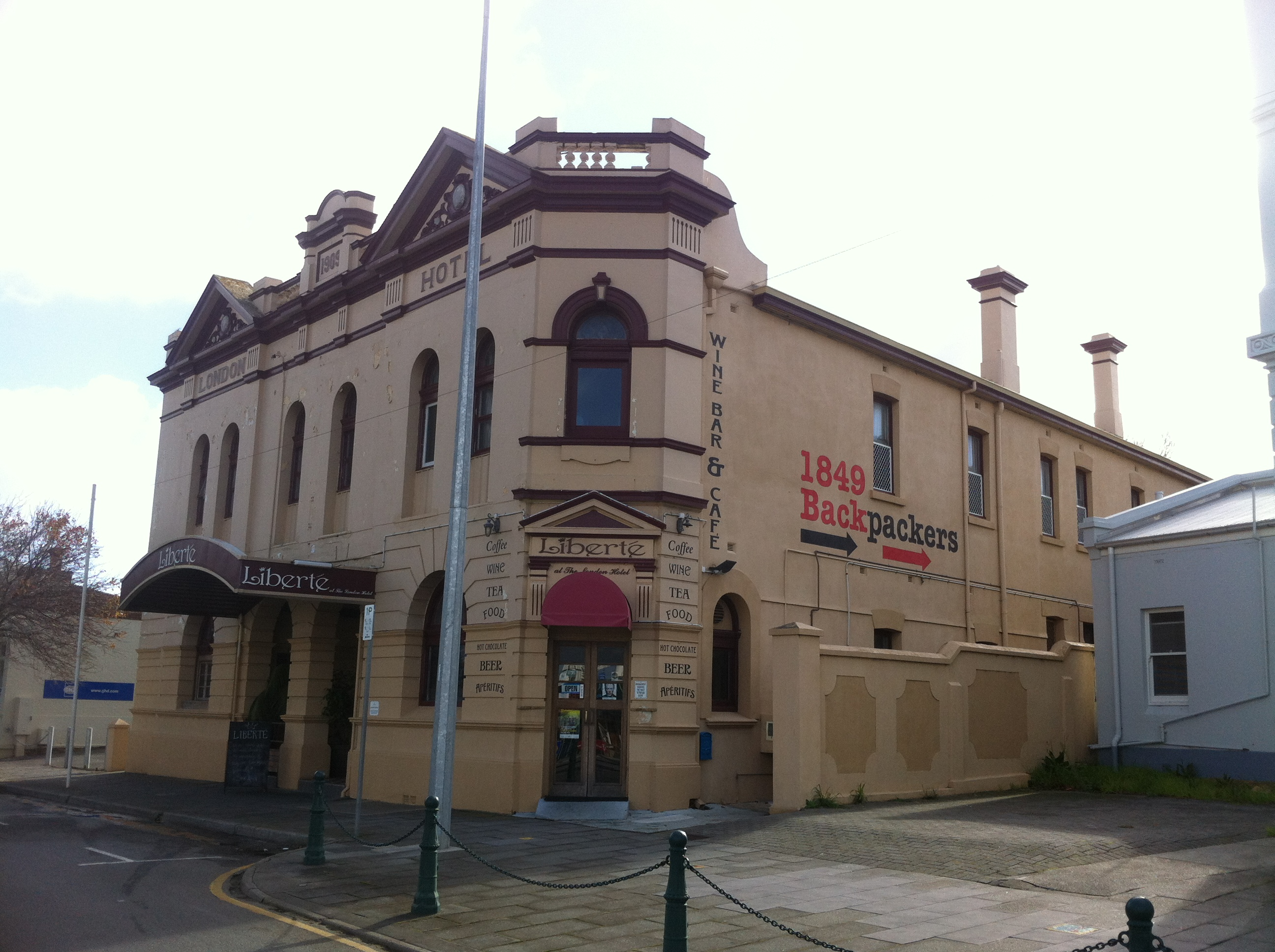
London Hotel from corner of York St and Stirling Tce

The London Hotel is a hotel on Stirling Terrace overlooking Princess Royal Harbour in Albany in the Great Southern region of Western Australia.

The current building was built in 1909 for the sum of £7,000. The building was designed by architect J. Herbert Eales. The proprietor was Harry C. Sims, with work completed by contractor A. Thompson. It was built on the site of the Chusan Hotel, which had stood on the site since 1849 and was rebuilt in 1871.

When it was constructed the two storey brick built hotel was plastered and surrounded by large spacious balconies. The entrance hall was reminiscent of an English mansion; a 22 ft (7 m) by 20 ft (6 m) drawing room opened onto the balcony, as did the dining room of similar proportions. The public bars were located on the ground floor. Sims remained the proprietor of the hotel until 1918.

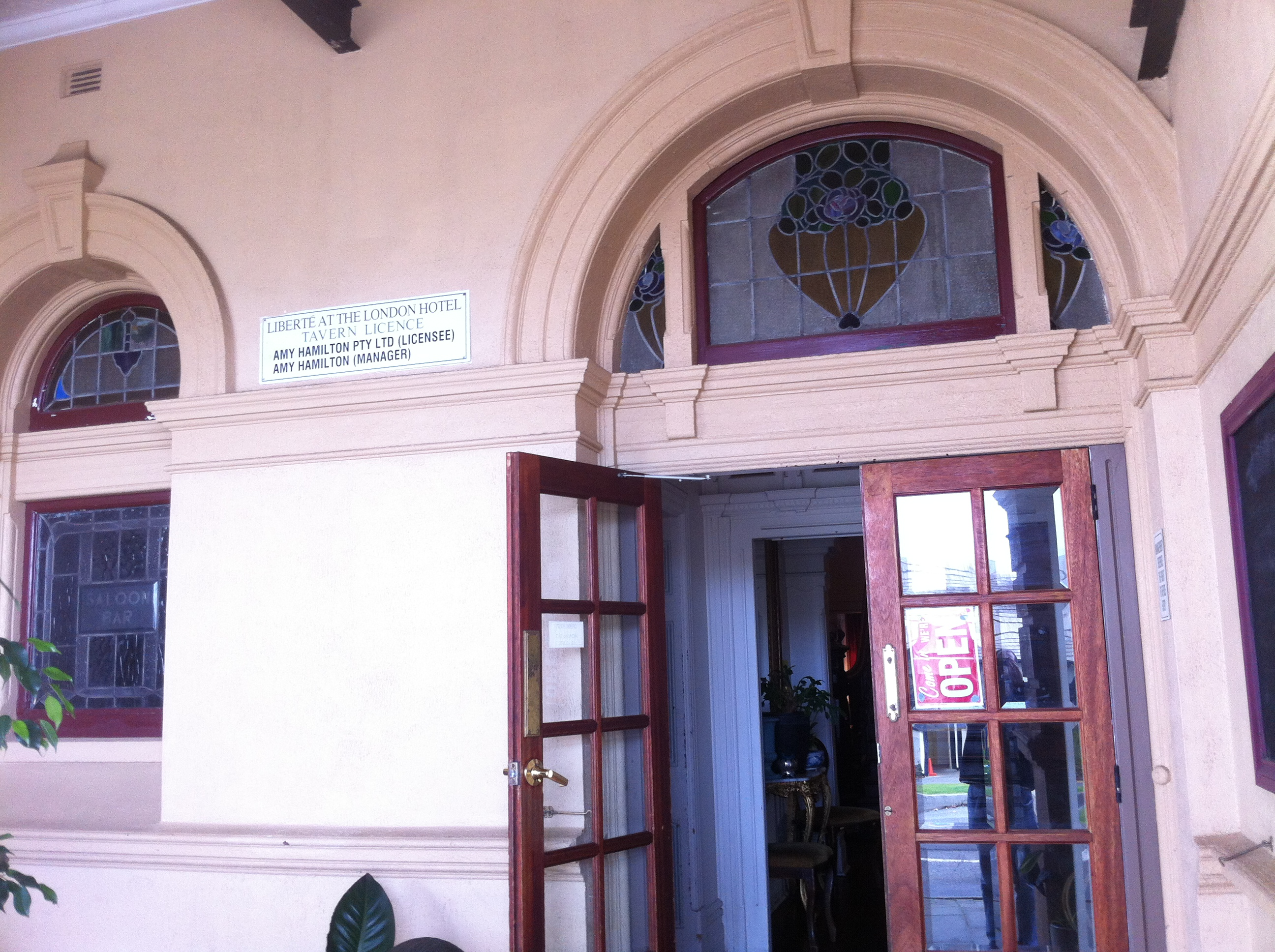
London Hotel entry

In 1930 the hotel was put up for auction and was sold to E. S. Cowan, a local resident, for £7500. Following the death of Cowan the hotel was again put up for auction in 1935 and was passed in for £4,750. The property was subsequently sold privately to Mrs R. Ruse of Mount Barker.

Kester Solomon, a professional gambler, took over the hotel in 2009 and transformed the interior, creating a European style coffee bar and a New York style cocktail bar. The hotel, now known as Liberte, has been refurbished with timber floors, regal wallpaper, mantelpieces and gilded mirrors.

== See also ==
- List of places on the State Register of Heritage Places in the City of Albany
