= William Grills Knight =

Australian politician

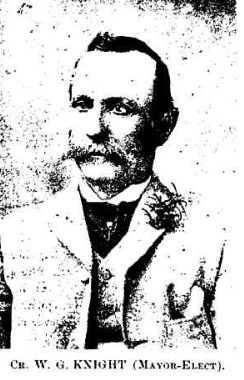
William Grills Knight in 1897

William Grills Knight (23 January 1839 – 3 May 1903) was a prominent businessman and politician who served as the mayor of Albany in the Great Southern region of Western Australia.

Knight was born 23 January 1839 in Fremantle, Western Australia to Stephen Henry Knight, a postmaster who had arrived on Parmelia in 1829 as one of the first settlers. The family moved to Albany the following year.

He married Ann Augusta McKail and together they had four children. In 1865 Knight was working as a farmer and grazier at Woodlands, a farm owned by John McKail, in the Porongurups.

The Rocks, an iconic building in Albany, was built by Grills in 1882 as his residence. The building, now used as an exclusive hotel, is heritage listed.

First elected in 1876 Knight then served as chairman from 1877 to 1879. Knight remained on the council and was elected as Mayor of Albany in 1886.

While Mayor, Knight raised the required capital to build the Albany Town Hall in 1886, which he later opened in 1888. By 1889 Lancel Victor de Hamel was elected Mayor, with Knight remaining on the council until his re-election as Mayor in 1897. He remained as Mayor until 1899 when C. M. McKenzie was elected to the position.

In 1896, Knight and his son started a shipping and station agents business in Albany.

Knight died in Albany on 4 May 1903 and was buried at Memorial Park Cemetery.

== See also ==
- List of mayors of Albany, Western Australia
