= John Moir (politician) =

Australian businessman and politician

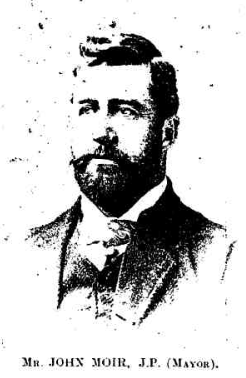
John Moir 1897

John Moir (29 July 1856 – 19 July 1939) was prominent businessman and politician who served as the mayor of Albany in the Great Southern region of Western Australia.

Born in Albany on 29 July 1856, he was the eldest son of Alexander Moir, who had arrived in Albany in 1852. Moir was sent to Perth as a child to study at Bishop's College. Arriving back in Albany at age 16 he joined his father in his business interests. By 1880 Moir's father retired and left him in charge of the family businesses. By 1882 Moir was the foundation president of the Albany Chamber of Commerce and Industry.

Moving to work briefly in South Australia Moir met and later married Edith Jane Lines in 1883. A year later they had a child, Clifford St John Moir, who died before his first birthday.

Later, returning to Albany, he contested the first mayoral election in 1885 but lost to William Finlay.

Moir built a new residence on Aberdeen Street in 1886; his wife died before the residence was completed. Moir, who was also a founding member of the Albany Club, let it be used as a club facility from 1895 until 1939 when the club acquired the building. The Albany Club building later became heritage listed.

Serving four terms as Mayor of Albany, from 1889 to 1890, and 1894 to 1897, Moir spent several years also serving on the Council.

In 1908 Moir sold off his other businesses only keeping his auctioneering branch under his name.

Moir died at Albany hospital on 19 July 1939 after a long illness, and was buried at Memorial Park Cemetery.

== See also ==
- List of mayors of Albany, Western Australia
