= William Finlay (mayor) =

Australian politician

William Finlay (22 February 1840 – 18 June 1886) was a policeman and the first mayor of Albany in the Great Southern region of Western Australia.

== Parents ==
Finlay's parents were William and Marjory (was Alcock) Finlay. His father, William Finlay (5 June 1807 – 11 June 1890) was born in Dundee, Scotland in 1807. He served in the army and rose to the rank of sergeant. William Jr. was born in 1840 in Ireland.

== Early life ==
The Finlays, both parents and three children, arrived in Western Australia aboard the convict ship Scindian in 1850. William senior was a Pensioner Guard, and the family initially settled at Freshwater Bay. Another five children were born in Western Australia over the next few years.

== Police ==
Finlay joined the police force in 1858; he served as a constable in Albany in 1864, moving to Williams in 1869, then to York in 1873 and then to Geraldton in 1874. He rose to the rank of sub-inspector in Albany in 1878.

During his time in the force he married Sarah Coppin in Busselton in 1861.

== Albany ==
Finlay resigned from the force in 1878 and was well remembered for his charitable work, administration skills and founding a local militia. He remained in Albany working as a clerk of customs and a tide waiter and also served as a municipal councillor. He was elected as the first mayor of Albany in 1885. The other candidates in the election were John Moir and Robert Andrew Muir. Finlay's home in Albany, known as McKenzie House or the White House, a grand federation style building overlooking Albany Port, is a still a local landmark.

== Death ==
William Finlay died on 16 June 1886 after a short illness. His death certificate states cause of death as "effusion on the brain". Sarah had died a few years previously. William was only 46, and left nine living children, five of whom were 16 years old or younger. One child had died in infancy in 1874.

== See also ==
- List of mayors of Albany, Western Australia
