= Lancel Victor de Hamel =

Australian politician

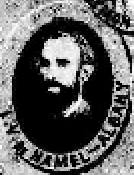
Lancel Victor de Hamel 1890

Lancel Victor de Hamel (10 September 1849 – 25 November 1894) was a publisher, solicitor and politician who represented the people of Albany in the Great Southern region of Western Australia.

== Early life ==
De Hamel was born on 10 September 1849 in London. His father, Felix John de Hamel, was a solicitor in Stoke Newington, London. Lancel followed in his footsteps and after completing his training worked as a solicitor for the Board of Trade, at Newcastle upon Tyne. He was actively involved in local politics as a conservative and a captain of the 3rd Volunteer Battalion of the Royal Northumberland Fusiliers.

He married Marion Eugenie de Manuel Hammond in 1877 in Northumberland and in the 1880s de Hamel embarked on an unsuccessful expedition to find buried treasure on a pacific island.

== Western Australia ==
De Hamel emigrated to Albany in 1886 for health reasons. In 1888 he established the Australian Advertiser, which later became the Albany Advertiser. Using the popularity of the newspaper he was elected Mayor of Albany later the same year.

De Hamel was a member of the Western Australian Legislative Council from 1889 to 1890; in 1890 he was elected as the member of Western Australian Legislative Assembly seat of Albany in the state's first parliament and remained in the position until 1894. He contested the seat of Yilgarn in 1894 but was defeated by Charles John Moran.

De Hamel opposed the government of John Forrest and was well known for his many fiery exchanges with Forrest in parliament. In 1893 he became the leader of the few diverse elements that made up the opposition. In 1892 de Hamel also started a law firm in partnership with James Montgomery Speed, with offices in Perth.

De Hamel died in Coolgardie of typhoid on 25 November 1894. He was buried in the Coolgardie Cemetery.

== Legacy ==
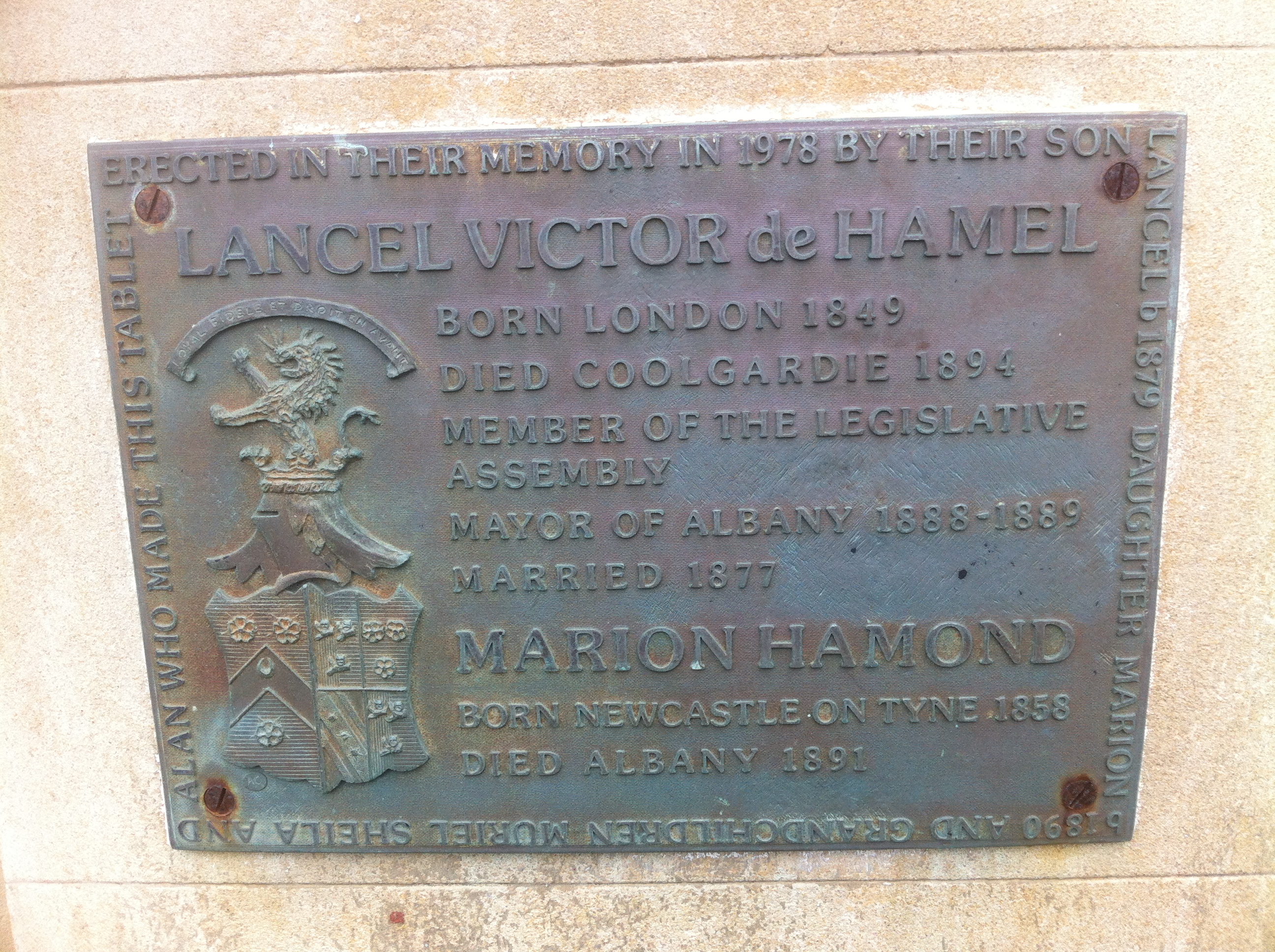
Plaque to Lancel Victor de Hamel on Albany Town Hall

The Albany Advertiser, first published by de Hamel in 1888 as the Australian Advertiser, is still in circulation. The paper is the oldest continuous-running non-metropolitan newspaper in Western Australia.

A bronze plaque to honour de Hamel was unveiled in 1978; it is found on the side of the Albany Town Hall.

The townsite of Hamel is named after him. The land the townsite occupies once belonged to de Hamel, who acquired it in the 1890s when it was opened up for settlement. The land was granted back to the government after his death.

== See also ==
- List of mayors of Albany, Western Australia
