= Folklore of Norfolk Island =

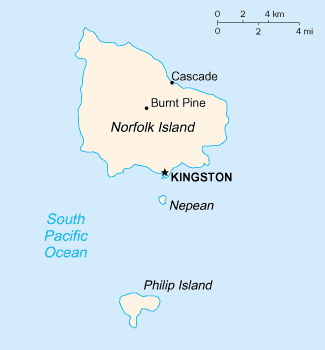
Norfolk Island's size and surrounds

Norfolk Island is an external territory of Australia in the Pacific Ocean. It was settled in 1788 as with New South Wales and despite its small population and size it has developed its own traditions and legends, some slightly different from the mainland. The island was un-populated when settled, though evidence does suggest that it was home to a population of East Polynesians centuries earlier.

== Events ==
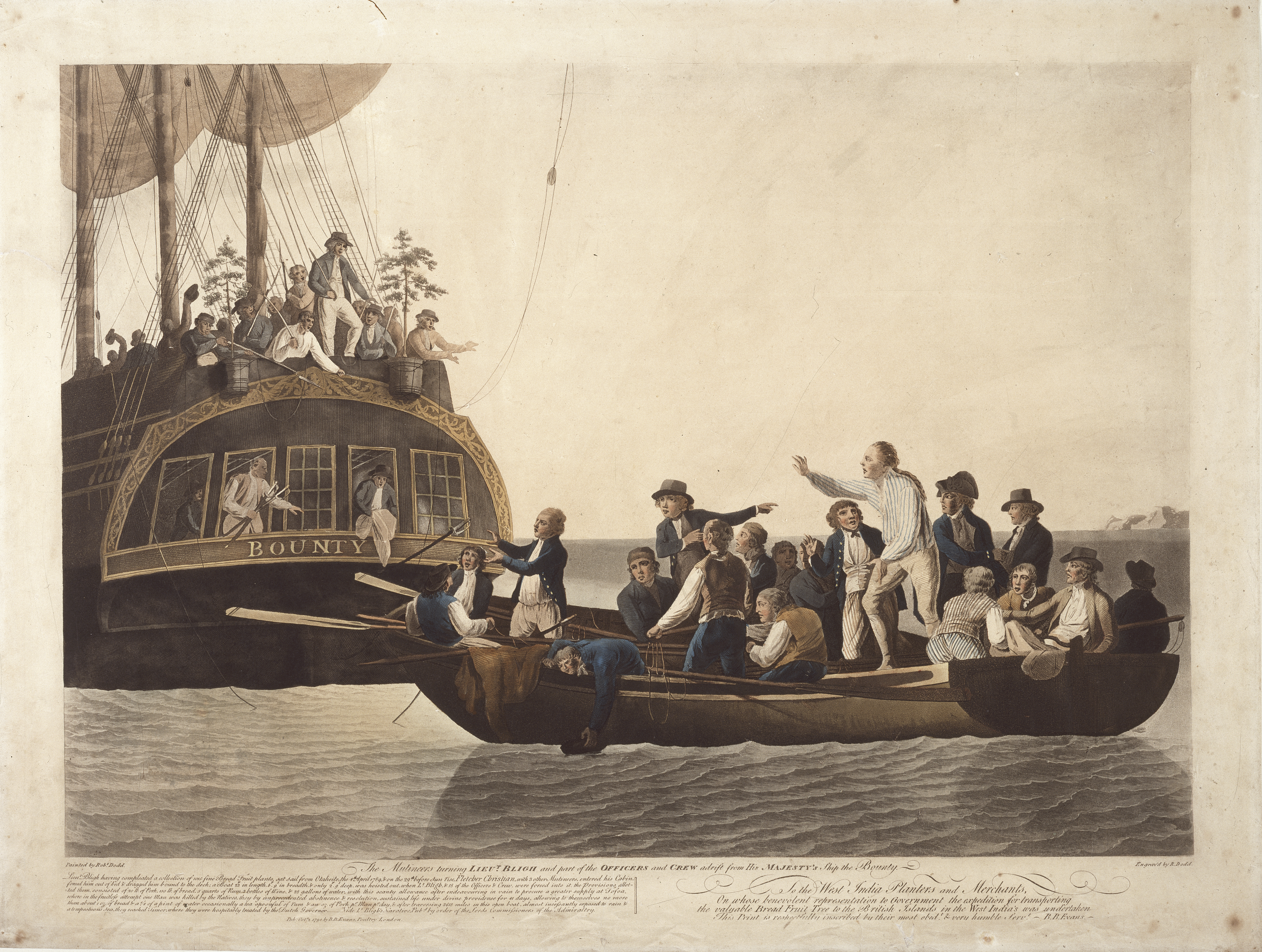
Mutiny on the Bounty

- HMS Sirius – Sometimes regarded as "Australia's famous shipwreck" Sirius was the flagship of the First Fleet and was wrecked upon the reef of Slaughter Bay.
- Mutiny on the Bounty – The mutiny of HMS Bounty. Many islanders can trace their ancestry to mutineers from the ship. Bounty Day is celebrated on the island because of these events.
- Norfolk Island convict mutinies – With Norfolk Island being a remote penal settlement, many of the convicts were treated poorly and led insurrections against the British, none more famous than the Cooking pot uprising.

== People ==
- Fletcher Christian – A master's mate on board HMS Bounty, many claim their ancestry from Christian himself.
- Phillip Parker King – Born on the island in 1791, son of New South Wales third governor Philip Gidley King. He was one of the first Australian born explorers.
- William Wentworth – Also born on the island, First native born Australian to receive recognition internationally.
- William Westwood – Led more than 1600 convicts in a rebellion against the British, due to poor treatment by Major Joseph Childs.

== Traditions ==
- Bounty Day – (See above) An annual holiday celebrated only in Norfolk Island and Pitcairn Islands, that remembers HMS Bounty.
- Foundation Day – The day that marks first settlement in 1788, in which a reenactment is held.
- Thanksgiving – The island is one of the few locations outside of North America and the only place in Australia to celebrate Thanksgiving. The tradition was brought there by American whalers in the mid-1890s.

== Other ==
Norfolk Island flag

- Canadian website The Paranormal lists Norfolk as No.4 in the world's most haunted islands.
- Norfolk Island pine – The native tree of the island, the symbolism of which is recognised on the Island's Flag.

== See also ==
- Bibliography of Norfolk Island
- Culture of Australia
- List of islands of Australia
- History of Norfolk Island
- Outline of Norfolk Island
