= Lady Franklin (barque) =

Australian barque (1841)

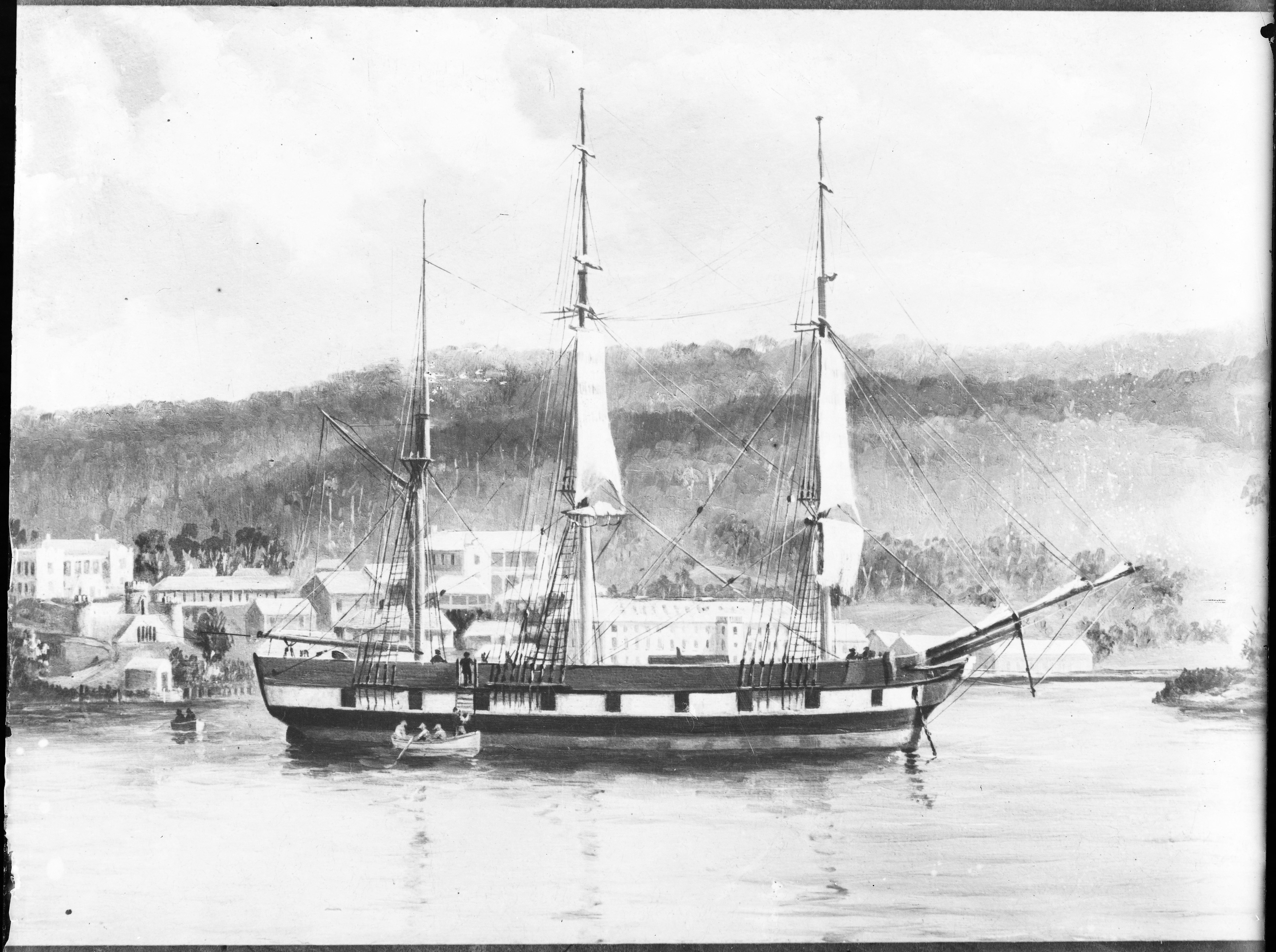
- Painting of the Lady Franklin at Port Arthur, Tasmania by Haughton Forrest in 1860s. Photograph of painting by John Watt Beattie in 1899.

History

United Kingdom
- Name: Lady Franklin
- Launched: 1841
- Renamed: Emily Dowing, 1855
- Stricken: 23 February 1898
- Fate: Broken up, 1898

General characteristics
- Class & type: Barque
- Tons burthen: 268 tons
- Length: 90 ft 0 in (27.43 m)
- Beam: 26 ft 3 in (8.00 m)
- Depth of hold: 17 ft 8 in (5.38 m)
- Propulsion: Sails
- Sail plan: Three masted barque

Lady Franklin was a 268-ton barque built at Port Arthur, Van Diemen's Land, in 1841, and was named after Jane Franklin, the wife of the governor, Sir John Franklin. The barque was best known for being seized by convicts in a mutiny in 1853.

The vessel was used mainly for the conveyance of stores between Tasmania and Norfolk Island. In July 1846 the vessel brought John Price, a formerly Police Magistrate at Hobart Town, and his family to replace Major Joseph Childs as head of the convict prison settlement on Norfolk Island. Also on board the Lady Franklin was Francis Burgess, a judge appointed to conduct the trials of nine convicts gaoled several months previously on stabbing, robbery and "unnatural offence" charges. They arrived shortly after the Cooking Pot Uprising.

On 28 December 1853 the vessel was seized by convicts. The mutineers were eventually captured in 1854. The story was dramatised for Australian radio in 1950.

In 1855 the Lady Franklin was put to public auction where it was sold to F. A. Downing for £2,049 and was renamed Emily Downing. The ship was refitted as a whaler and went on to make 23 whaling voyages from Hobart between 1857 and 1885. In 1864 the ship was sold by auction for £350 to Alexander McGregor, a Hobart shipowner and merchant.
