= Henry Beresford Garrett =

British criminal

Henry Rouse (aka Henry Beresford Garrett)
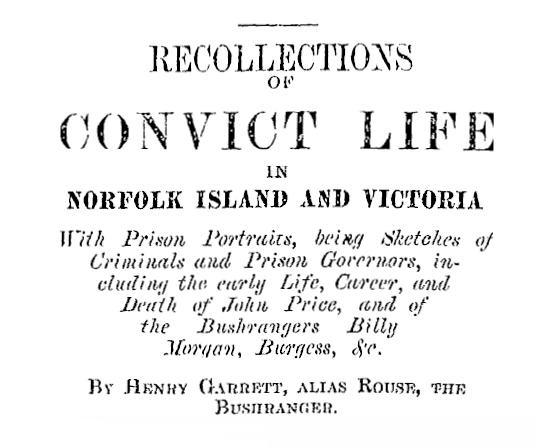
- The title heading of Henry Garrett's recollections, published serially in the Otago Witness newspaper in 1886.
- Born: c. 1818; Bottesford, England
- Died: 3 September 1885; Wellington, New Zealand
- Other names: 'Long Harry', Henry Beresford Garrett
- Occupation: Cooper
- Conviction: Armed robbery
- Penalty: Numerous sentences

Henry Beresford Garrett (c. 1818 – 3 September 1885) was a habitual criminal who served prison sentences in England, Tasmania, Victoria and New Zealand. Born Henry Rouse, he used a number of aliases including 'Long Harry' and Henry Beresford Garrett.

== Biography ==
=== Early life and crimes ===
Henry Rouse was born in about 1818 at Bottesford, Leicestershire, England, the son of tenant farmer Thomas Rouse and his wife Catherine. The fourth of five children, Rouse's mother died when he was three and thereafter the children lived with a grandmother until Thomas Rouse remarried in 1832. Later in his life Henry wrote that his father had neglected him during the period he was in the care of his grandmother. Henry Rouse had little schooling, but learnt the trade of coopering.

In January 1842 Henry Rouse was tried in the county of Leicester for assaulting a gamekeeper, and received a sentence of three months' imprisonment "and sureties". Prior to July 1845 Rouse was described as "a native of Hose", a village about 16 km south-west of Bottesford. Rouse had a fearsome reputation from his time at Hose. A decade after he had been transported to Australia the local newspaper claimed that “several parties have dreaded the return of this man, who would endanger both their lives and property”. It was asserted that Rouse had “been heard to say that he should no more mind taking the life of a man than that of a dog”. On 25 July 1845 he was sentenced to 10 years' transportation at the Nottingham County Assizes for "shop breaking". Rouse, in company with two other men, had stolen cloth to the value of £50 from a tailor in Bingham, Nottinghamshire (about 13 km north-west of Hose). He was sent from England on 25 August 1845 on board the Mayda with 198 other convicts.

=== Norfolk Island ===
Henry Rouse was initially incarcerated on Norfolk Island, arriving there in December 1845 aboard the Mayda. At the time of his arrival "mutinous disturbances" were reportedly occurring in the penal settlement, then under the administration of Major Childs. On the morning of 1 July 1846 a serious outbreak occurred (later known as the ‘cooking pot riot’) which resulted in a riot and the murders of three convict-constables and an overseer. Shortly afterwards Major Childs was replaced by John Price, formerly Police Magistrate at Hobart Town. Price's period as Commandant of the Norfolk Island penal settlement was characterised by his merciless exercise of authority. The short period that Henry Rouse lived under Price's administration left a deep impression on him. Later in his life he wrote about John Price, whom he called ‘the Demon’.

=== Van Diemen’s Land ===
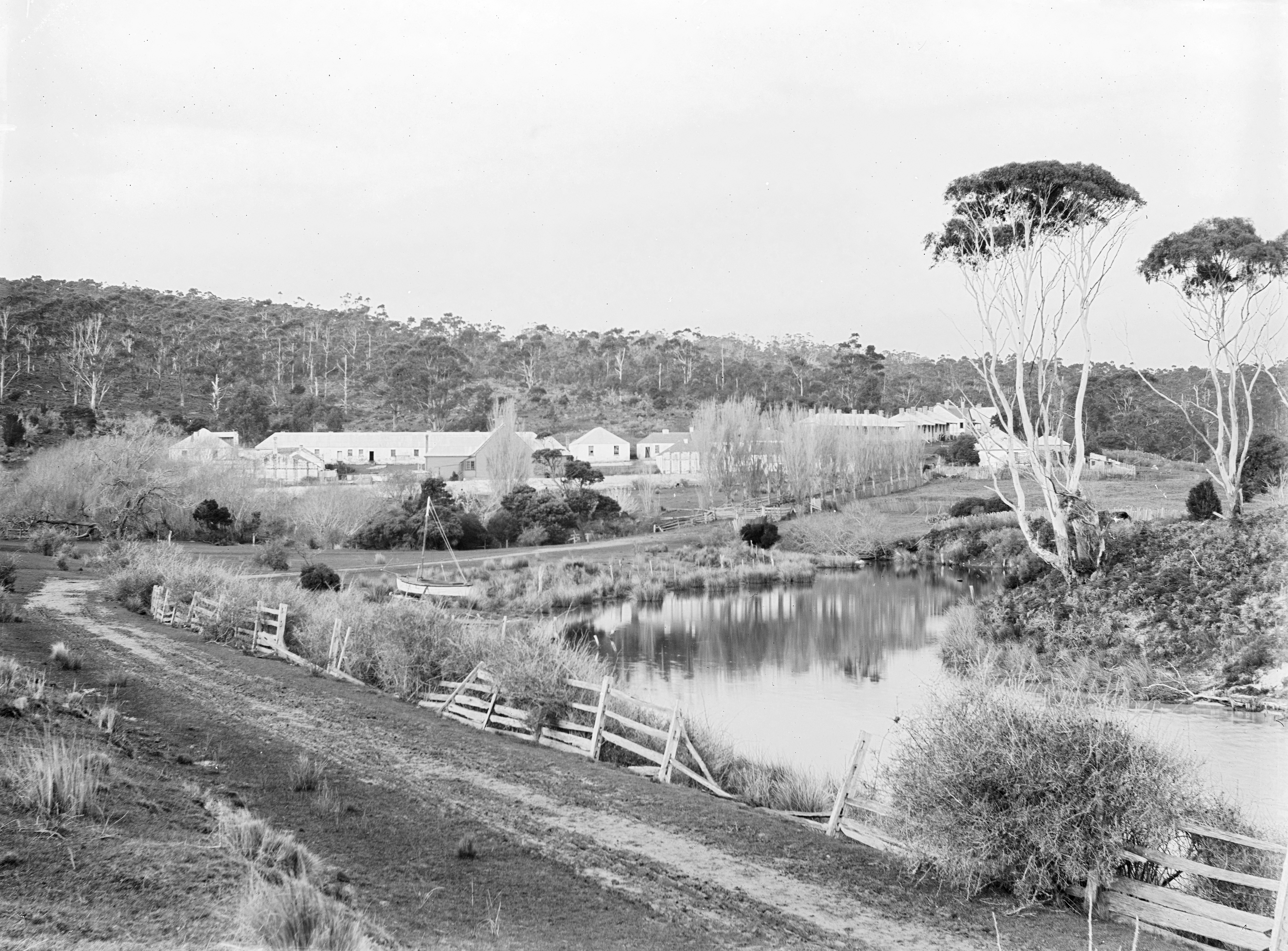
Darlington Probation Station on Maria Island, Van Diemen's Land.

In 1847 Rouse was transferred from Norfolk Island to the Hobart district of Van Diemen's Land. By mid-1848 he was confined at Cascades, on the outskirts of Hobart Town, probably at the Probation station where, amongst other activities, timber was being milled (some of it for conveyance to England). In July 1848 Rouse was given a period of hard labour for “making private clothing in Gov’t hours”. Later the same year an incident of misconduct involving “shouting & hiding in his cell” was noted on his convict record. He did, however, receive one positive notation on his record for his services as a monitor (possibly in a school-room situation at the station), probably a position he attained because he could read and write.

By February 1849 Rouse, probably in his capacity as a cooper, was assigned to John Johnson at the New Wharf, the waterfront precinct of Hobart Town. Henry Rouse absconded from his master in August 1849, but was captured soon afterwards. In October an extra eighteen months were added to his sentence and he was sent to the Darlington Probation Station on Maria Island, off the east coast of Tasmania. The Probation Station on Maria Island was in its last few years of operation and by 1850 it had closed.

By July 1850 Henry Rouse was assigned to Thomas Jennings in Hobart Town. However, on July 18 he was discharged and returned to Government control when he was discovered “out after hours” and being suspected of involvement in a robbery at Johnston's stores. The next day Rouse absconded, but he was probably caught soon afterwards. In February 1851 he applied for a ticket-of-leave but it was refused. Rouse was assigned to John Darley at New Norfolk and then in March 1851 to Joseph Jennings at New Town (about 2 miles north of Hobart Town). In October 1851, amongst the items advertised as lost property at the Central Police Office (“a large proportion taken from prisoners of the Crown”), was a silver watch by Breguet which had been recovered from “Henry Rouse, a pass-holder”.

=== The Ballarat bank robbery ===
By the early 1850s Henry Rouse had managed to cross Bass Strait and was living in the Colony of Victoria, initially working as a cooper in Geelong. Whether he arrived as a free man or as an escaped convict is not known, but the latter seems likely with his ‘Rouse’ surname no longer being used.

About this time he took the name Henry Garrett when he lived with an 'actress' on the Ballarat goldfields.

In October 1854 Henry Rouse, now calling himself Henry Garrett (and known as ‘Long Harry’), was living in a tent at the Big Gravel Pits at Ballarat. Garrett joined with three other men – John Boulton and Henry Marriott, both living at Ballarat, and Thomas Quinn, a stonemason from Geelong – and devised a plan to rob the Bank of Victoria in Bakery Hill, Ballarat. They instituted their plan in the middle of the day on Monday, 16 October 1854. Carrying revolvers without powder or shot, but with paper in the muzzles and new caps to appear as if they were loaded, the four men hid themselves in the bush at the back of the bank. After observing there were no customers in the bank, the four men entered the building and locked the door. Boulton had calico with eye-holes to conceal his identity and the other three had black crêpe cloth over their faces. They bailed up the two employees and tied and gagged them. After collecting an amount of money and gold from the bank, the four separated, leaving the scene by different routes and meeting later on in Garrett's tent. After they had tallied their stolen haul, they found they had notes, sovereigns and silver to the value of £14,300 as well as 350 ounces of gold.

=== London ===
Garrett and his wife travelled overland to Sydney before sailing in December 1854 to England on the Dawstone, they arrived at Deal on 12 April 1855, and immediately travelled by railroad to London. The following day the Garrett sold to Messrs. Samuels and Montague, bullion dealers, Cornhill, 499 ounces of gold dust for £1,975 claiming he struck it rich on the Bendigo goldfields.

What Garrett could not have known was his accomplice Quin had turned Queens evidence and a warrant was issued and waiting for him to turn up. London detective Henry Webb arrested Garrett the next day as he was walking down the Oxford Street. His room was searched and two revolvers and a dagger were found.

Garrett was returned to Melbourne for trial and sentenced in November 1855 to 10 years hard labour. He was confined on the prison hulks President and Success, that were moored in Hobsons Bay. The conditions were appalling on the hulks.

Released in 1861, Garrett boarded a ship and moved to New Zealand.

=== New Zealand ===
Garrett arrived in Dunedin on the Kembla on 7 October 1861 en route for the Otago goldfields. Garrett and several companions carried out highway robbery of fifteen men, they stole gold and property worth some £400 at the foot of the Maungatua range, on the track between Gabriels Gully and Dunedin. Garrett fled to Sydney where he was arrested in December, sent back to Dunedin and sentenced to eight years gaol in May 1862.

Released in February 1868 and sent back to Victoria by the Otago police. The Victorians didn't want him so they sent him back and he returned to Dunedin, where he worked as a cooper in a brewery. In November 1868 he was arrested while burgling a seed merchant, he had also broken into a chemist's shop. He received 10 years' gaol for each burglary, to be served consecutively.

=== Final years ===
Released from Lyttleton goal April 1882 after being transferred from Dunedin Goal in 1881 because of failing health, he again worked as a cooper. Habits of a lifetime were impossible to break and in November 1882, he was caught thieving and sentenced to seven years. He died of chronic bronchitis on 3 September 1885 while serving his sentence in Wellington Goal.

== The Codrington Revingstone mis-association ==
Some websites claim that Henry Rouse (Garrett) was the bushranger who styled himself ‘Codrington Revingstone’ and committed several armed mail-robberies in the early 1850s along Portland Bay between Portland and Belfast (now Port Fairy). However, this association is factually incorrect. At the time of Revingstone's first robbery in June 1850 Henry Rouse was either incarcerated on Maria Island or had been assigned to Thomas Jennings in Hobart Town. Codrington Revingstone's exploits are described in the article about the township of Codrington (now a rural locality), which was named after the bushranger.

== Bibliography ==
- Hill, R. S., Policing the colonial frontier, 2 vols. Wellington, 1986.
- Tonkin, L., The real Henry Garrett, Dunedin, 1980.
