= Norfolk Island convict mutinies =

Series of armed uprisings

Norfolk Island convict mutinies were a series of armed uprisings by convicts on the penal colony of Norfolk Island, Australia. All were unsuccessful.

== 1826 rebellion ==
1826 convict rebellion
| Date | 25 September 1826 |
| Location | Norfolk Island |
| Result | Unsuccessful escape attempt |

Belligerents
| Convict insurgents | (United Kingdom of Great Britain and Ireland) British Army |

Commanders and leaders
| "Black" John Goff | Vance Young Donaldson |

Strength
| over 50 | |

Casualties and losses
| 3 convicts hanged | 1 soldier killed |

The first convict rebellion took place in September 1826.

It was led by "Black" John Goff. He arranged for two convict decoys to make an escape attempt; they were followed by several soldiers. While this happened, fifty convicts seized and bound their overseers, robbed the stores for provisions and put three boats to sea. One soldier was killed, bayoneted to death, while others were wounded.

The convicts sailed to Phillip Island where they were eventually re-captured, although some eluded the authorities for up to six months.

The ringleaders – Goff, William Moore and Edward Watson – were tried and hanged in Sydney in 1827. The Chief Justice said when passing sentence on John Goff:

You... have detailed to the Court a long complaint of the hardships you have undergone, of your love of liberty, and of the degree of violence which you thought yourself justified in using to obtain it. By your own statement your whole life has been one career of crime... It is within the recollection of this Court, how near you were, at no distant period, to have been consigned to the grave, and happy would it have been for you had your career then terminated without the additional crime of the blood of a fellow creature being added to the list... With respect to the general harsh treatment of which you complain on Norfolk Island, what are men sent there for? It is within the knowledge of the Court that they are never sent except for crimes of the deepest dye; and is it then to be supposed that they are sent there to be indulged, to be fed with the fruits of the earth and that they are not to work in chains? No, the object in sending men there is not only as a punishment for their past crimes, but to serve as a terror to others; and so far from it being a reproach, as you have stated it, it is a wise project of the Government in instituting that settlement for the punishment of the twice and thrice convicted felon, as a place of terror to evil doers, and in order to repress the mass of crime with which the Colony unhappily abounds.

== Capture of Wellington ==
Capture of Wellington
| Date | 21 December 1826 |
| Location | Norfolk Island |
| Result | Mutiny successful though later captured |

Belligerents
| Convict insurgents | (United Kingdom of Great Britain and Ireland) |

Commanders and leaders
| John Walton | |

Strength
| 66 convicts | |

Casualties and losses
| 2 killed 5 executed | |

On 21 December 1826, the ship Wellington was seized by the 66 convicts it was taking to Norfolk Island. Twenty of the ship's crew and soldiers were kept prisoners. Soldiers had kept firing through the bulk head into the hold until it became apparent that crew members were in danger of being injured.

The convict Walton appointed himself captain of the vessel, Douglas as first mate and "Flash Jack" Edwards as second mate and Clay as steward. A gale sprang up and the sailors were asked to help work on the ship. They refused at first but changed their mind with the consent of the captain.

=== Re-capture ===
Wellington then sailed to the Bay of Islands in New Zealand, where they were recaptured by a whaler, The Sisters under the command of Captain Duke.

Due to their merciful treatment of the captured ship's guards and crew, only five of the prisoners were executed, although 23 were condemned to hang.

== 1827 uprising ==
1827 Uprising
| Date | October 1827 |
| Location | Norfolk Island |
| Result | Unsuccessful uprising |

Belligerents
| Convict insurgents | (United Kingdom of Great Britain and Ireland) British Army |

Commanders and leaders
| Patrick Clynch | Thomas Wright |

There was an attempted uprising in 1827 with an attempt made on the life of new commandant Thomas Wright by Patrick Clynch.

Clynch was later captured and then shot.

Wright was later arrested for ordering Clynch's murder and put on trial. He was acquitted.

== 1830 escape ==
1830 Escape
| Date | 19 June 1830 |
| Location | Norfolk Island |
| Result | Unsuccessful escape |

Belligerents
| Convict insurgents | (United Kingdom of Great Britain and Ireland) British Army |

Commanders and leaders
| | Lt Borough |

Strength
| 11 convicts | |

Casualties and losses
| 11 convicts drowned (presumed) | |

In 1830 there was a successful escape of eleven convicts from the island on a newly constructed whaleboat. They went to Phillip Island, where they robbed a visiting botanist, Mr. Cunningham of provisions.

Lt Borough took charge of a boat and took off after the felons but was forced to turn back as darkness began to fall and the rough seas.

The convicts that took to sea and were never heard of again – it is presumed they all drowned.

== 1834 rebellion ==
1834 Convict Rebellion
| Date | 15 January 1834 |
| Location | Norfolk Island |
| Result | Rebellion crushed |

Belligerents
| Convict insurgents | (United Kingdom of Great Britain and Ireland) British Army |

Commanders and leaders
| | Captain Foster Fyans |

Strength
| over 100 | |

Casualties and losses
| 6 dead 13 convicts executed | 1 soldier dead 1 guard dead |

In January 1834 a serious insurrection occurred on Norfolk Island, involving over a hundred convicts who made a series of concerted attacks against their guards, with the ultimate aim of taking control of the island and effecting an escape by the next Government vessel to arrive with supplies.

On the morning 15 January 1834 about 30 men, following a pre-arranged plan by pretending sickness, fell out of various of the Camp and Longridge gangs and went to the hospital. They entered the hospital and secured those there by locking them in a room, and then proceeded to break off their irons. From the hospital the mutineers waited for the gaol-gang to be turned out for work under an armed guard. As this occurred the insurrectionists rushed from the hospital behind the gaol and attacked the rear rank of the guard. After a short struggle during which two or three muskets were wrested from the soldiers, six of the mutineers were killed or wounded and the guard “succeeded in dispersing and finally in securing them”.

The trial of those charged as "principals and accessories" of the insurrection commenced on 12 July 1834 before Justice William Burton. At the conclusion of the trial on July 22, thirteen men were convicted of mutiny and sentenced to death.

On 10 September 1834 two clerics and the New South Wales hangman left Sydney for Norfolk Island aboard the brig Governor Phillip, to carry out the executions of the thirteen convicted mutineers. Seven of the men were hanged on Monday, September 22, and the remaining six the following day.

- Robert Douglas - 22 September 1834 - Hanged for mutiny
- Henry Drummond - 22 September 1834 - Hanged for mutiny
- James Bell - 22 September 1834 - Hanged for mutiny
- Joseph Butler - 22 September 1834 - Hanged for mutiny
- Robert Glennie - 22 September 1834 - Hanged for mutiny
- Walter Burke - 22 September 1834 - Hanged for mutiny
- Joseph Snell - 22 September 1834 - Hanged for mutiny
- William McCulloch - 23 September 1834 - Hanged for mutiny
- Michael Andrews - 23 September 1834 - Hanged for mutiny
- William Groves - 23 September 1834 - Hanged for mutiny
- Thomas Freshwater - 23 September 1834 - Hanged for mutiny
- Henry Knowles - 23 September 1834 - Hanged for mutiny
- Robert Ryan - 23 September 1834 - Hanged for mutiny

== 1842 rebellion ==
On the morning of 21 June 1842, a convict work party aboard the Governor Phillip at Cascade were let out to start unloading the launch of the brig, as they had to make way for a ship that had arrived from Sydney. After seeing that only a sergeant and two soldiers were on deck, the convicts overpowered them and held the Governor Phillip for roughly half an hour before the soldiers trapped below deck were able to retake the brig. Five mutineers and one soldier were killed in the affray, and another two soldiers were severely wounded. Three of the soldiers that were initially confined below deck were also scalded badly when the convicts poured boiling hot water through gaps in a hatch that they had bolted shut.

At trial, one of the convicts was released for saving a soldier who had been thrown overboard. Five other convicts were put to death, one of whom received a reprieve and was instead transported for life. The other four convicts were hanged in November. The Australian reported, "We heard several of those employed about the gaol remark that they had never witnessed men come to the scaffold so firm, yet in so resigned and devotional a state of mine."

== 1846 rebellion ==
1846 Convict Rebellion
| Date | 1 July 1846 |
| Location | Norfolk Island |
| Result | Rebellion crushed |

Belligerents
| Convict insurgents | (United Kingdom of Great Britain and Ireland) British Army |

Commanders and leaders
| William "Jackey Jackey" Westwood | Joseph Childs |

Strength
| 1,600 | |

Casualties and losses
| 12 convicts executed | 4 officials killed |

There was a final rebellion of convicts in 1846. It was led by William "Jackey Jackey" Westwood, a bushranger who had recently been sent to Norfolk Island. He was known as the "Gentleman Bushranger".

Joseph Childs took over the running of Norfolk Island in 1844, ushering in a far harsher regime than his predecessor. He greatly reduced prisoners' privileges and in May 1846 ordered prisoners to hand in their tins and knives and other utensils. In response, Westwood led an uprising of convicts which resulted in an overseer and three constables being killed. However, the mutiny was suppressed by the colony's military.

Westwood was sentenced to death with 11 others and was executed on 13 October 1846.

The governance of Joseph Childs was blamed for causing the mutiny. He was replaced by John Price.

== See also ==
- Folklore of Norfolk Island
