= Henry Garrett =

Henry Garrett may refer to:

- Henry Garrett (psychologist) (1894–1973), American psychologist and segregationist
- Henry Garrett (actor) (fl. 2007), English actor
- Henry Beresford Garrett (1818–1885), New Zealand cooper and criminal
- Henry L. Garrett III (born 1939), U.S. Secretary of the Navy
- Hank Garrett (born 1931), American actor and comedian
