= William Westwood (bushranger) =

English bushranger in Australia (1820–1846)

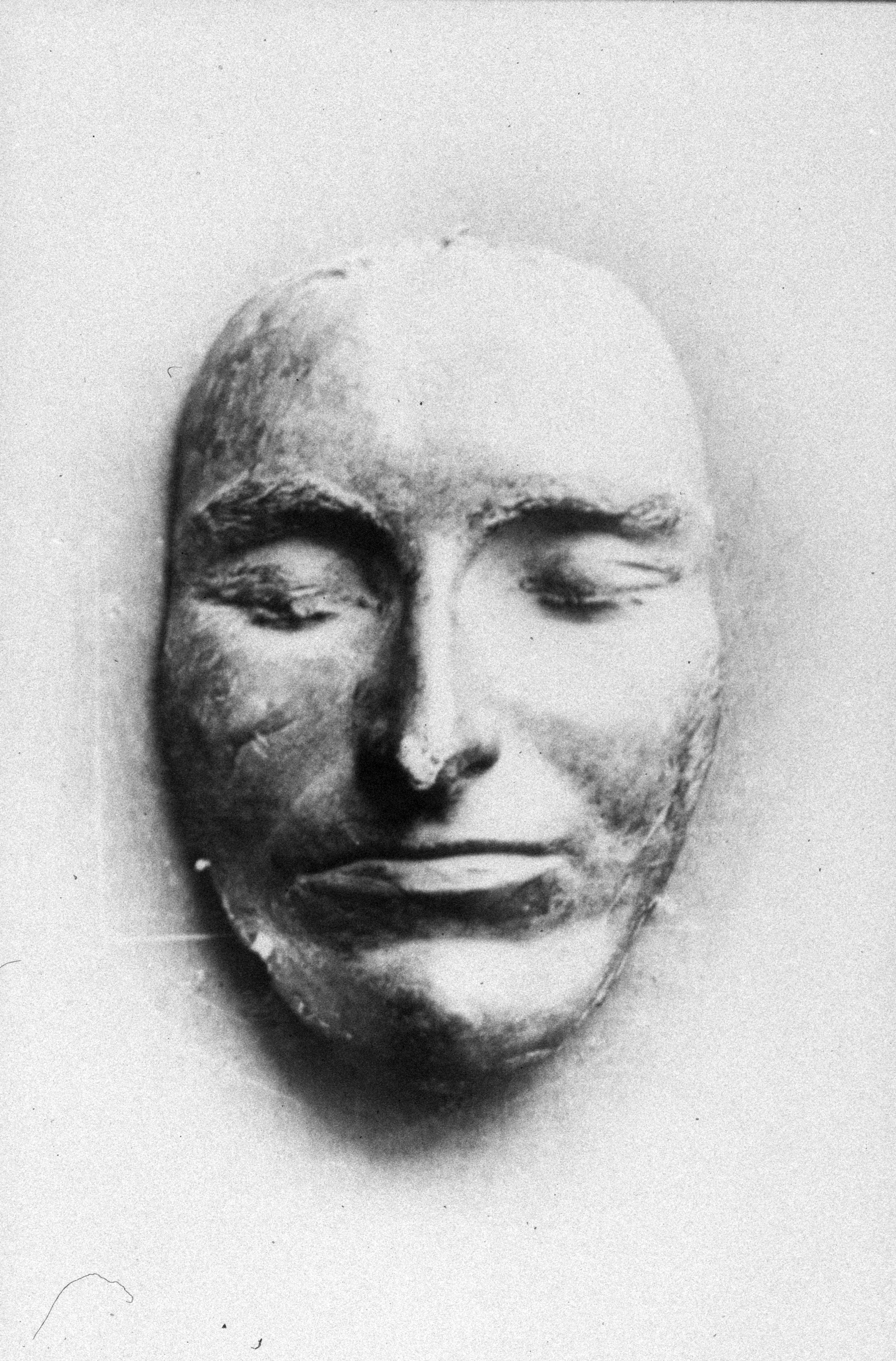
- Westwood's death mask
- Born: August 7, 1820; Manuden, Essex, England
- Died: October 13, 1846 (aged 26); Norfolk Island
- Other names: Jackey Jackey; Gentleman bushranger
- Occupation: Bushranger
- Parents: James Westwood; Ann Westwood
- Conviction: Murder
- Penalty: Death by hanging

William Westwood (7 August 1820 – 13 October 1846), also known as Jackey Jackey, was an English-born convict who became a bushranger in Australia.

Born in Essex, Westwood had already served one year in prison for highway robbery before his transportation at age 16 to the penal colony of New South Wales on a conviction of stealing a coat. He arrived in 1837 and was sent to Phillip Parker King's station near Bungendore as an assigned servant, but grew to resent working there due to mistreatment from the property's overseer. In 1840, after receiving 50 lashes for attempting to escape, Westwood took up bushranging. The following year, troopers captured Westwood at Berrima, where he was convicted of armed robbery and horse stealing and sentenced to life imprisonment at Darlinghurst Gaol. Westwood escaped again and continued bushranging until his re-capture in July 1841. Sent to Cockatoo Island, he led a failed mass escape, and was transported for life in 1842 to Port Arthur, Van Diemen's Land.

Westwood tried to escape from Port Arthur two times and received 100 lashes for each attempt. He successfully escaped in 1843 by swimming the channel; two other convicts who accompanied him were eaten by sharks. His new bushranging career ended that November when he was captured and sentenced to twelve months' hard labour and solitary confinement. The following year, William Champ, Port Arthur's new commandant, promoted Westwood to his boat crew, and approved his removal to Glenorchy on probation after the convict rescued two drowning men. Within several months, he returned to bushranging, and after his capture in September 1845 outside Hobart, was transported for life to Norfolk Island. There, in response to commandant Joseph Childs' confiscation of the prisoners' cooking utensils, Westwood led the 1846 Cooking Pot Uprising, during which he murdered three constables and an overseer. He was captured and executed along with eleven other convicts.

In the days before his execution, Westwood wrote an autobiography at the suggestion of Thomas Rogers, a religious instructor, who later had it published in The Australasian. Westwood also wrote a letter to a prison chaplain who had once befriended him, detailing the severe treatment of Norfolk Island prisoners by the authorities, and decrying the brutality of the convict system as a whole. It was published widely in the press and cited by activists campaigning for the end of penal transportation to Australia.

== Family and early years ==
William Westwood was the eldest child of James and Ann Westwood and was born on 7 August 1820, in Manuden, Essex, England. He was baptised on 27 August 1820 in the Church of St Mary the Virgin. On 10 March 1835 William and Benjamin Jackson, both aged fourteen, appeared at the Essex Lent Assizes in Chelmsford charged with highway robbery. They were accused of stealing a bundle of clothes from Ann Saunders on the road near Manuden. William was found guilty and sentenced to twelve months imprisonment with hard labour in Chelmsford Gaol. His accomplice, Benjamin Jackson was sentenced to be whipped, and discharged.

Released from gaol in 1836 William soon fell into bad company. On 3 January 1837 William, aged 17, together with James Bird, aged 21, appeared at the Essex Quarter Sessions in Chelmsford. The two were charged with stealing a greatcoat belonging to John Rickett that he had left in a stables in Manuden overnight. Westwood and Bird took the stolen coat to a clothes shop owned by John Warner in Hare Street, Hertfordshire where they sold it for 6 shillings. In need of a replacement coat Rickett called at John Warner's shop the following day where his stolen coat was offered to him. Westwood and Bird were quickly identified as the culprits and arrested by Constable Charles Moss. At their trial Bird was acquitted but William was found guilty and, because this was his second offence, sentenced to transportation for 14 years.

On 2 February 1837 William was delivered to the prison hulk Leviathan in Portsmouth Harbour where he was held before being transferred to the ship Mangles which sailed for NSW on 18 March 1837. He arrived in Sydney on 9 July 1837. He had several tattoos on his arms and a scar on his face.

== Transportation to Australia ==
Upon arrival in Sydney, Westwood was assigned to Phillip Parker King at his property, 'Dunheved' in Rooty Hill (near Penrith in western Sydney). In late December 1837 he was sent to the family property, 'Gidleigh' near Bungendore, New South Wales. The overseer of this location mistreated Westwood, not providing sufficient food and clothing. He tried to run away from his employer on more than one occasion, but each time was recaptured, beaten, and then put back to work. After stealing wheat, Westwood was sentenced to six months working on the roads in a chain gang on 19 April 1838. Once again escaping and being caught, Westwood publicly received 50 lashes on 4 February 1839.

== Bushranging ==
In September 1840 Westwood escaped for good, being known as Jackey Jackey, with Paddy Curran. Westwood was "out 7 months in the bush under Arms" and avoided being captured by hiding in the mountains. One of their first robberies occurring at the 11-mile turnoff in Carwoola. Curran did not have the same beliefs and views on robbery as Westwood. Together they robbed Phillip Parker King's house and Curran, tempted by revenge, raped King's wife. Westwood did not approve of this at all so beat Curran up, stole his horse, guns, and ammunition, and declared that if they ever met again, Westwood would kill him. Jackey Jackey was a very courteous robber, never actually hurting any of his victims. He mainly stole racing horses (to ensure a quick getaway), clothing, guns, ammunition, money, and necessities of living. Along with not hurting his victims, he would never dare to be rude to women which is why he had threatened to kill Curran. Jackey Jackey often showed up in a suit to a robbery, being declared the "Gentleman Bushranger." He was captured only twice, but escaped both times. A sign was posted across Australia calling for him to be caught, dead or alive.

== Capture and recapture ==
Early in January 1841, Jackey Jackey was captured by a party of five civilians which included the priest of Bungendore at an inn near Berrima. While waiting to be transferred, he escaped from the lock-up at Bargo, taking the firearms and ammunition of one of the police. A day or two after his escape he stuck up Mr. Francis McArthur, and took from the carriage a valuable horse. He then proceeded to Gray's Inn, about two miles from Berrima, when he was set upon by Mr. Gray, who was assisted by his wife and daughter, Miss Gray displaying remarkable bravery in the encounter. A carpenter named Waters also joined in the attack, and felled the bushranger by a blow on the head with a shingling hammer, and then captured him. Mr. Gray received the £30 reward which had been offered by the Government for Jackey Jackey's capture, and Waters, who was a convict, received a free pardon. Curran was captured later that year and hanged at Berrima.

On 8 April 1841, he appeared at Berrima Circuit Court charged with stealing in a dwelling house and putting in bodily fear; robbing with firearms, and horse stealing. Jackey Jackey was taken to Darlinghurt Jail and sentenced to life imprisonment. Escaping for a short period he succeeded in evading the police and was not heard of again till he called at the toll gate on the Parramatta road, about three miles out of Sydney. He asked the tollkeeper if he had ever heard of Jackey Jackey. "Oh, yes", replied the man, "but he is a long way off; he ain't to coming to Sydney, they would catch him if he did." Westwood then drew his pistol from his waist, and told the scared toll keeper that he was Jackey Jackey, and that he had spent the past three days in Sydney. The incident ended by Jackey Jackey giving the old man a bottle of rum.

On 12 July 1841 Westwood was reported to have committed a robbery at Paddy's River. On Tuesday evening, 13 July 1841, Westwood entered Edward Gray’s Black Horse Inn, near the crossroads ten miles from Berrima. He took charge of the firearms at the inn and had ordered the till to be taken out when he was set upon by the publican Gray and two other men, a ticket-of-leave holder named Francis McCrohan and Joseph Waters, an assigned convict. McCrohan struck 'Jackey Jackey' several blows with a hammer, the second of which felled him. He was then chained to a cart and conveyed to Berrima Gaol, where he was placed in irons.

After his re-capture Westwood was sent to Cockatoo Island, Port Jackson. While at Cockatoo Island, he and twenty-five other convicts, attempted to escape by swimming to the mainland, but the gang were followed by the police in their boat and all captured. As a result, he was shipped to Port Arthur on the Governor Phillip. En route, Jackey Jackey once again tried to escape from the ship's hold and take over the ship on the way to the port. Shortly after arriving at Port Arthur he escaped, but after nine days' starvation on that inhospitable place, he was captured as one of the convicts who had escaped with him, Frank Bailey, had been shot.

Twelve months afterwards he again succeeded in making his escape to the mainland, but was again captured and placed in Hobart Town gaol, from where as a last resort, he was sent over to Norfolk Island, "the penal colony of penal colonies".

The next year W. T. Champ promoted Jackey Jackey to be on a boat crew of his. After rescuing two men from drowning, Jackey Jackey was removed from Port Arthur to probation at Glenorchy in May 1845. Temptation got the best of him, though, and Jackey Jackey stole guns and ammunition. Jackey Jackey was tried on 4 September 1845, in the Hobart Supreme Court. He was sentenced to life in prison on Norfolk Island.

== Norfolk Island ==
=== Cooking Pot Uprising ===
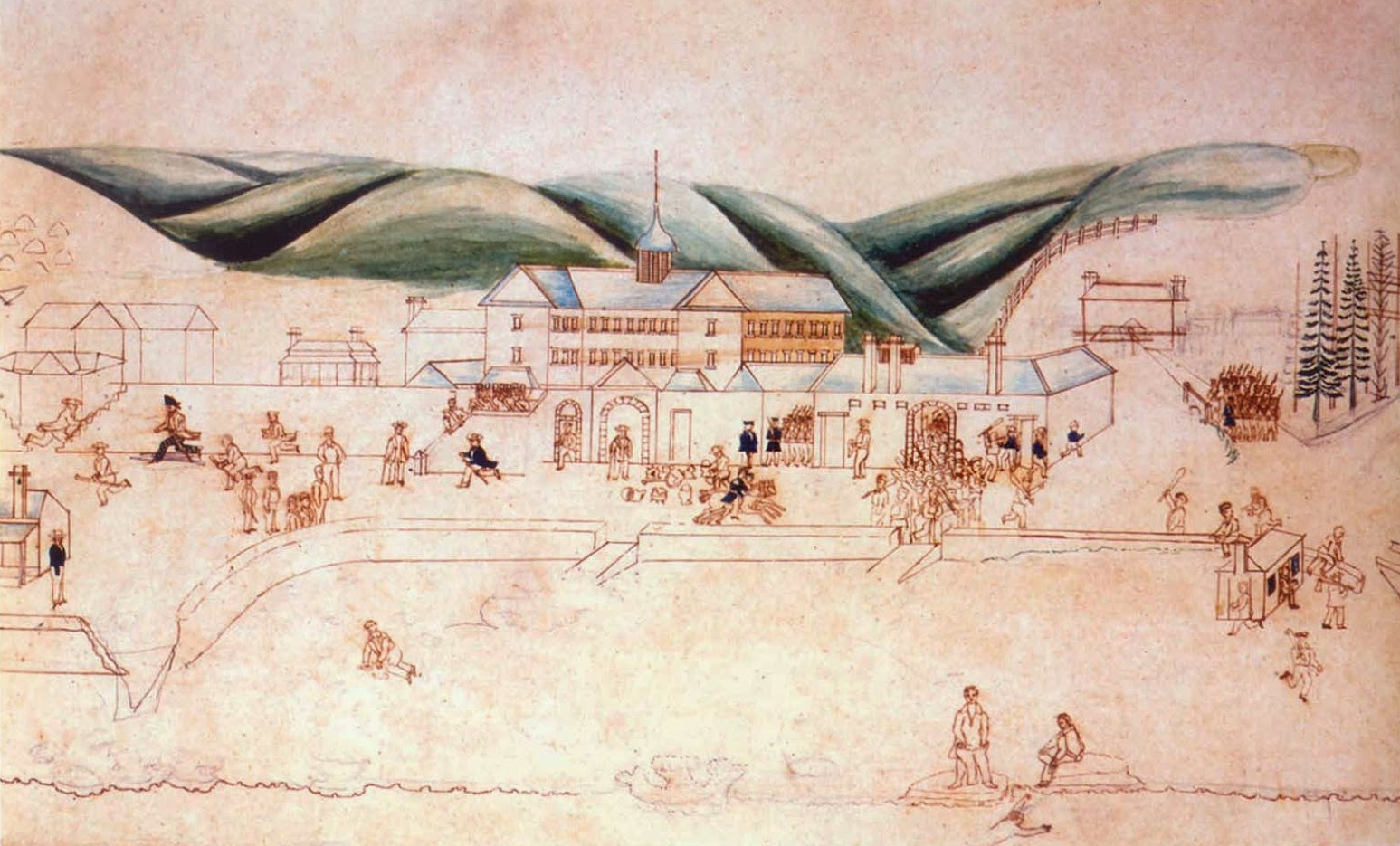
Watercolour drawing of the Cooking Pot Uprising

In February 1844, Major Joseph Childs took over the command of the convict prison settlement at Norfolk Island where he began a regime of harsh, rigid discipline that ended with mutiny, massacre, and the execution of 12 men.

His predecessor, Captain Maconochie, had been of a more kindly disposition. He had looked on his prisoners as human beings and had given them some little interest in life by allowing them to have small farm plots in which they could grow sweet potatoes and other vegetables. Maconochie also shortened hours of labour, holidays were granted to those convicts whose behaviour was considered satisfactory, and each prisoner was allowed to cook his own meals in saucepans and kettles specially provided.

Major Childs decided to alter all this. Gradually, over a period of two years, he withdrew the privileges that had made the men relatively contented under Maconochie. He abolished the private farm plots. He lengthened the daily hours of work and he withdrew holidays for good behaviour. He cut down the prisoners' rations. And then, on the memorable first day of July, 1846, he announced the abolition of the last little privilege—the last vestige of privacy that had given the men a feeling that they were individuals.

Major Childs issued a proclamation that food was to be served in bulk, that no personal cooking was to be permitted, and that kettles and saucepans held by prisoners were to be handed in.

The next day, after a compulsory prayers parade, the convicts went in a body to the lumber yard to read the new proclamation. There were indignant cries. Gathering in rough military formation they marched to the Barrack Yard, stormed the store, and seized every utensil within reach. Westwood hushed them. "Now, men", he said, "I've made up my mind to bear this oppression no longer. But, remember, I'm going lo the gallows. If any man funks, let him stand out. Those who want to follow me—come on!"

And so the mutiny began. Westwood, his face transformed with rage, struck at a constable who was watching the proceedings. He felled him, and his mates, their pent-up fury now finding a savage outlet, struck at him with knives, sticks, pitchforks—with any weapons they could find.

Then they hurried to the cook house. Here they found Stephen Smith, the mess overseer. Jackey Jackey attacked him. "For God's sake don't hurt me, Jackey!" he cried out. "Remember my wife and children!" "Damn your wife and children;" said the livid young convict, and knocked him senseless. When the others had finished with him he was a mutilated corpse. The convicts moved on in a wildly rushing mass about 1,600 strong, to the Barrack Yard gate, where they pushed aside a sentry and an overseer who tried to halt them. Their one thought now was to get to Government House, where the main target of their wrath was Mr. Barrow, the Stipendiary Magistrate. As they passed by the lime kiln Jackey Jackey, now wielding an axe, ran over to a hut, forced open the door, and killed two policemen, one of whom was asleep in his bed.

As they moved down the road towards Government House, they were confronted by a line of soldiers, muskets at the ready. As though the force of their passion had suddenly been spent, the convicts halted, and then began to retreat towards the lumber yard, where their weapons were taken from them, and they were returned to their cells.

At only 26 years old, Jackey Jackey was finally tried with 11 of the most prominent leaders of the mutiny and all were hanged on 13 October 1846. Jackey Jackey was buried in unhallowed ground.

== Legacy ==
=== Cultural depictions ===
In 1844, Melbourne writer Thomas McCombie published a supposedly true-life account of Westwood in Tait's Edinburgh Magazine. The following year, he collaborated with playwright James McLaughlin in dramatising the story for the theatre. Titled Jackey Jackey the NSW Bushranger, it was not performed publicly until 1852, due to the colonial government's fear that plays about bushrangers would encourage anti-authoritarian attitudes.

Westwood features as a character in Mary Theresa Vidal's 1850 novel The Cabramatta Store: A Tale of the Australian Bush.

== See also ==
- List of convicts transported to Australia
