= John Parnham =

English cricketer and umpire

Personal information
- Full name: John Thomas Parnham
- Born: 6 September 1856; Bottesford, Leicestershire, England
- Died: 18 February 1908 (aged 51); Church, Lancashire, England
- Batting: Unknown
- Bowling: Slow left-arm orthodox

Domestic team information
- Years: Team
- 1883–1889: Marylebone Cricket Club

Career statistics
| Competition | First-class |
|---|---|
| Matches | 8 |
| Runs scored | 178 |
| Batting average | 19.77 |
| 100s/50s | –/– |
| Top score | 90* |
| Balls bowled | 457 |
| Wickets | 16 |
| Bowling average | 18.37 |
| 5 wickets in innings | 2 |
| 10 wickets in match | 1 |
| Best bowling | 7/25 |
| Catches/stumpings | 3/– |
- Source: Cricinfo, 10 September 2019

John Thomas Parnham (6 September 1856 – 18 February 1908) was an English first-class cricketer and umpire.

Parnham was born at Bottesford, Leicestershire. He made his debut in first-class cricket for a United Eleven against the touring Australians in 1882 at Tunbridge Wells. The following season he made three first-class appearances, playing twice for the Marylebone Cricket Club (MCC) against Oxford University and Cambridge University, and once for The Rest against a combined Nottinghamshire and Yorkshire cricket team at Bradford. He played once in 1885 for the MCC against Sussex, before playing for the North in the North v South fixtures of 1886 and 1887. His final first-class appearance came in 1889, for the MCC against Cambridge University at Fenner's. An all-rounder, he scored a total of 178 runs at an average of 19.77, with a high score of 90 not out for the North in 1886. With his slow left-arm orthodox bowling, he took 16 wickets at a bowling average of 18.37. His best figures of 7 for 25 came on his first-class debut for the United Eleven, with Parnham taking 5 for 101 in the Australians first-innings and 7 for 25 in their second-innings. Besides playing, Parnham stood as an umpire in three first-class matches during the 1880s, before later standing in four matches in the 1903 Minor Counties Championship. He died in February 1908 at Church, Lancashire.
