= Linden Park Cricket Club =

UK cricket club

Coordinates: 51°7′45″N 0°15′7″E

Linden Park Cricket Club (LPCC) is a cricket club based at Higher Cricket Ground, Fir Tree Road, Royal Tunbridge Wells, Kent, England.

The club has a senior section which runs five Saturday league teams, with the top two sides playing in the Kent League, the 3rd, 4th and 5th sides playing in the Sussex Cricket League. It also runs two Sunday sides, one of which plays in a development league for part of the season, and a midweek side.

The club also has a junior section which fields five sides each week across the age ranges Under 9s to Under 15s.

== Location ==
For over 100 years the Higher Ground cricket pitch, overlooked by the Wellington Rocks, has been a jewel in the centre of the Common. Situated in the centre of Tunbridge Wells, the Common provides a tranquil open space amidst the hustle and bustle of this beautiful and historic spa town.

The beauty of its location and its friendly welcome mean that LPCC is one of the highlights on the fixture list for all of its visiting teams. On a typical summer weekend, an estimated 3,000 people realise that there is no better place than one of the many benches around the ground to slow down and relax in the sun to the sound of leather on willow.

== History ==
Cricket has been played on Tunbridge Wells Common for over 200 years with the first recorded game taking place in 1782 between Tunbridge Wells and Groombridge. In 1876 Lewis Luck formed a cricket club known as Tunbridge Wells Juniors, initially playing near the present Nevill Ground. Following the opening of the Linden Park estate the club moved to the Lower Ground and changed their name to Linden Park Cricket Club. In 1898 the club moved to the present location on the Higher Ground, where it remains today.

In 1882 a United England XI (W G Grace captain) played Australia at the Higher Ground. The visitors were bowled out for 49 by a team including local legend John Harvey.

In 1927 LPCC played against a Frank Woolley XI with 6,000 spectators.

On 19 June 1941, 1,500 people watched LPCC beat a British Empire XI but the following year the "Empire fought back", beating LPCC.

On 6 May 1949 a match against Kent saw Les Ames make 91 out of 226 but unfortunately the team was bowled out for 71 in reply.

Further matches against Kent and visiting academy and national sides (including West Indies) took place in the following years.

== Development of youngsters ==
The club's most important role is to encourage, assist and develop junior cricket in Tunbridge Wells. Its links to local schools are important and it is committed to this going forward. The club welcomes players of all standards and ages from 7 upwards. A team of qualified coaches under Brian Gasking manages teams at Under 9, 11, 13 and 15 who each have a full programme of both competitive matches and friendlies where the emphasis will be on ensuring "everyone takes an active part". Every Friday evening from April to September the cricket pitch is full of children playing as up to 130 boys and girls turn up to enjoy coaching where the emphasis is on learning – with fun. Their parents seem to enjoy it too as in most weeks many stay throughout the evening chatting and enjoying a well-earned drink in the beautiful surroundings of the Common.

== Pavilion ==
A central feature of the local community with over 300 players of all ages, Linden Park Cricket Club and its welcoming 130-year-old clubhouse provided a quintessential sense of British history complementing the beautiful Georgian and Victorian architecture of the town. However, in 2006 the club's Pavilion was destroyed in an arson attack. Fixtures for the season were in place, pre-season practice was completed, the days were getting longer, the sides for the first matches were selected and the pitches were cut. Everything was in place – but at around 3 am on 14 April, "Good Friday", and the day before the first game of the season, an alarm was raised – vandals had broken into the pavilion and set fire to it. Unfortunately, though a beautiful old structure designed to fit into the surroundings, the structure was 130 years old and made out of wood. Despite the best efforts of the fire services, the building was completely wrecked. Changing, showering, cooking and bar facilities, not to mention somewhere to hide from the rain, the very heart of the club had been taken away in just a couple of hours. The match the next day (15 April) had to be cancelled.

However, that was the only one to be cancelled all season. Members and friends all helped and opposing teams demonstrated huge understanding and support for the club's plight. Emergency equipment was found. Mowers and groundskeeping tools and storage containers to put them were organised. Portable units for changing and the all-important bar were found. The Club did not live in the lap of luxury but it did survive.

After a mammoth fundraising effort covering nearly two years, the rebuilding of the clubhouse commenced in 2007 in time for the 2008 summer, a real 'Phoenix from the Ashes' moment for the local community.

== Recent years ==
Since the rebuild of the Pavilion and its opening on 13 July 2008, the club's membership has increased, particularly at junior level where the club has a huge base. Onfield results have also improved with three promotions in a row for both the Saturday Kent League sides, meaning that for the 2013 summer both will play in the second tier of the Kent League - the highest level the club has reached for several decades.

2012 also saw a promotion for the Saturday 4th team, and for the Sunday Development League team.
