= Higher Common Ground =

Cricket ground in Royal Tunbridge Wells, England

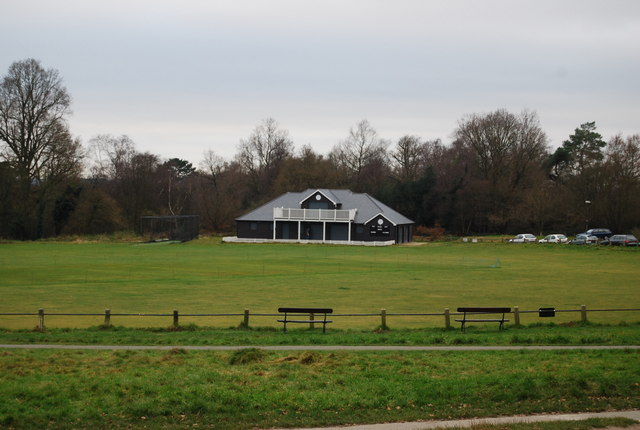
- Higher Common Ground in December 2008
- Interactive map of Higher Common Ground

Ground information
- Location: Tunbridge Wells, Kent
- Country: England
- Coordinates: 51.129°N 0.253°E
- Establishment: 1782 first recorded match
- Owner: Manor of Rusthall
- Operator: Tunbridge Wells Commons Conservators
- Tenants: Linden Park Cricket Club

Team information
Tunbridge Wells Cricket Club	(1833–1931)
Kent County Cricket Club	(1845–1884)
South of England	(1854–1883)
Linden Park Cricket Club	(1906–present)
- As of 3 December 2017; Source: CricketArchive

Higher Common Ground is a cricket ground on Tunbridge Wells Common in the town of Royal Tunbridge Wells in Kent. It was used as a ground by Kent County Cricket Club in the 19th century and is the home ground of Linden Park Cricket Club.

The ground is located in the central area of Tunbridge Wells Common, close to the Wellington Rocks, an outcrop of Ardingly Sandstone laid down in the Lower Cretaceous period. It is on Fir Tree Road, around 250 metres (0.16 mi) from the A264 road to the north and 500 metres (0.31 mi) from the A26 road to the south and east. The centre of Tunbridge Wells is 600 metres (0.37 mi) east of the ground.

== Establishment ==
Cricket has been played on the Tunbridge Wells Common since at least the 18th century and the first recorded match on the ground took place in 1782. In 1839 Tunbridge Wells Cricket Club were given permission to improve the ground and cricket began to be played more formally on the ground. The ground was enlarged in 1859 and in 1875.

== Cricketing history ==
The first first-class cricket match was held on the ground in 1844, when a team of Married cricketers played a Single's team. Kent County Cricket Club first used the ground in 1845 and county matches were played on the ground until 1880 with Kent playing 28 matches in total on the ground, 18 of them against Sussex.

A total of 36 first-class matches were held on the ground, including five featuring the South of England between 1854 and 1883 and one match in 1882 when a United Eleven, captained by WG Grace, played the touring Australians. The ground stopped being used as a first-class venue due to concerns over the condition of the pitch which was "regularly trampled by the public and grazing animals". After the match against the Australian team in 1882, in which Australia were bowled out for 49 runs, reports suggested that "fencing is required to keep the cows out", although the match report in The Times makes no mention of the pitch being a factor in their low score, blaming instead the "carelessness" of the Australian captain Billy Murdoch and crediting the fine bowling of the Leicestershire born professional John Parnham who took 12 wickets in the match.

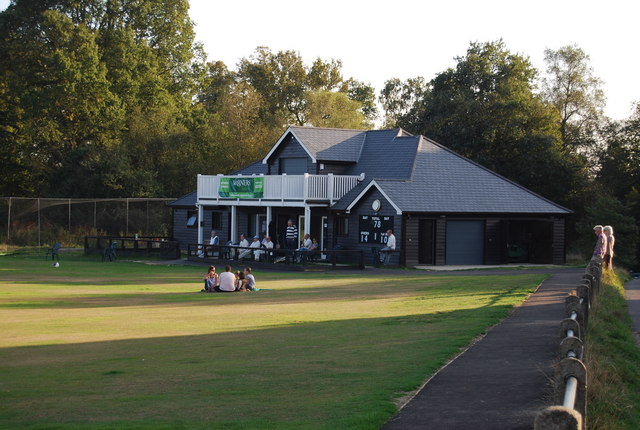
The new pavilion at the ground, September 2009

The ground has been used since 1906 by Linden Park Cricket Club. The club plays in the Kent Cricket League and fields a number of teams at weekends as well as using the ground for junior and midweek cricket.

The first cricket pavilion was built at the ground in 1922 and replaced with a new building in 2008. The Common is also the site of another cricket ground, the Lower Cricket Ground around 0.8 miles (1.3 km) north-west of the Higher Common Ground alongside the A264, which is home to Rusthall Cricket Club. It was first used for cricket in 1850 and improved in 1885.

== Records on the ground ==
A total of 36 first-class matches have been played on the ground, 28 of them featuring Kent as the home team.

- Highest total: 405 by Kent against Sussex, 1878
- Lowest total: 36 by Kent against Sussex, 1858
- Highest partnership: 129, 2nd wicket by W Barnes and W Flowers, for MCC against Kent, 1879
- Highest individual score: 127, L Hall, for North of England against South of England, 1883
- Best bowling in an innings: 8/34, (Note: J Dean took eight wickets for Sussex against Kent in 1851 but the number of runs conceded in the innings is unknown due to an incomplete score card.) J Wootton, for Kent against Surrey, 1880
- Best bowling in a match: 13/42, J Jackson, for North of England against South of England, 1857
