= The Priory Belvoir Academy =

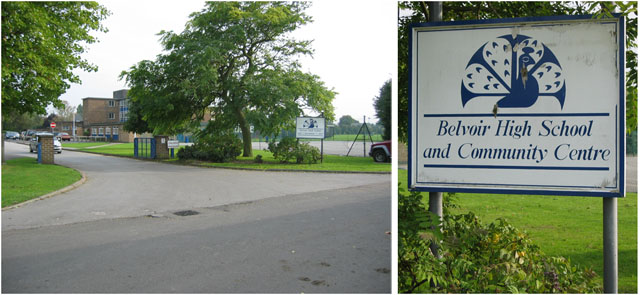

Location
- Barkestone Lane; Bottesford, Leicestershire, NG13 0AX; England
- Coordinates: 52.9372°N 0.8077°W

Information
- Type: Academy
- Department for Education URN: 138819 Tables
- Ofsted: Reports
- Headteacher: Levon Newton
- Gender: Mixed
- Age: 11 to 16
- Enrolment: 645
- Website: https://www.belvoiracademy.co.uk/

The Priory Belvoir Academy (formerly Belvoir High School) is a mixed secondary school located in Bottesford in the English county of Leicestershire. The school previously also operated Melton Vale Post 16 Centre in Melton Mowbray. It was founded in 1960.

== History ==
Originally a middle school, Belvoir High School changed its intake in 2008 and became a secondary school for pupils aged 11 to 16. It was converted to an academy in October 2012, as part of the Belvoir and Melton Academy Trust. In 2017, the Belvoir and Melton Academy Trust was discontinued and Belvoir High School became part of The Priory Federation of Academies Trust. the school was then renamed The Priory Belvoir Academy.

As of 2019, the school's most recent Ofsted inspection was in 2018, and the judgement was Good.

=== Melton Vale Post 16 Centre ===
Melton Vale Post 16 Centre (MV16) is a sixth form centre located in Melton Mowbray in Leicestershire.

From 2012 to 2017 it was part of the Belvoir and Melton Academy Trust. In 2017 it became part of the Nova Academy Trust.

As of 2018, the centre's most recent Ofsted inspection was in 2015, and the judgement was Outstanding.

== Notable former pupils ==
=== Belvoir High School ===
- Robert Harris, novelist
- Sean Lamont, rugby player
