= Cooking Pot Uprising =

1846 penal colony riot in Norfolk Island, Australia

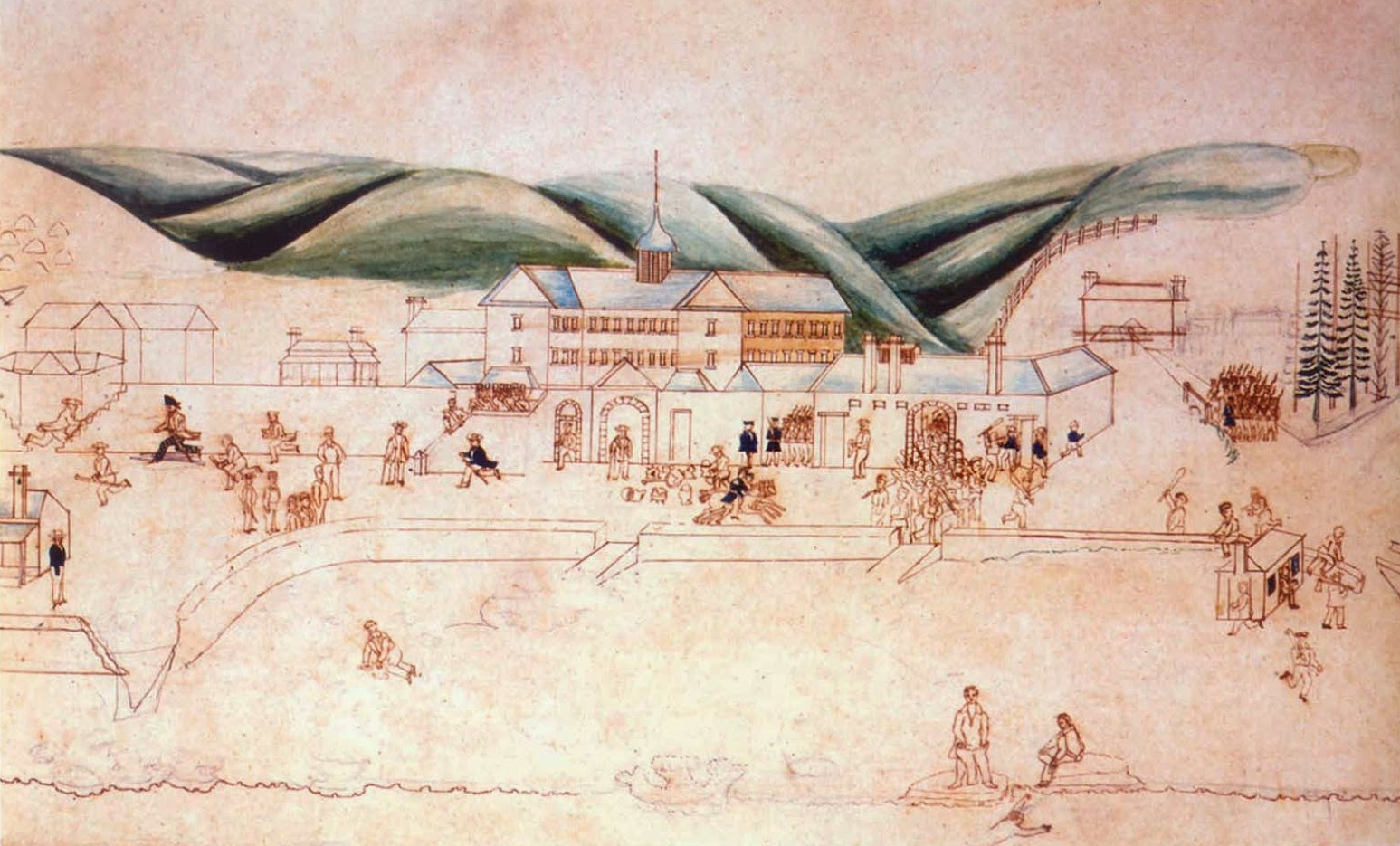
- A depiction in watercolour of the Cooking Pot Uprising
- Date: 1 July 1846
- Location: Norfolk Island
- Also known as: Cooking Pot Riot
- Cause: Confiscation of cooking vessels
- Participants: Convicts, led by William Westwood
- Deaths: John Morris (convict constable); Stephen Smith (overseer); Thomas Saxton (convict constable); John Dinon (convict constable)
- Convicted: 13 convicts
- Sentence: Death

The Cooking Pot Uprising or Cooking Pot Riot was an uprising of convicts led by William Westwood in the penal colony of Norfolk Island, Australia. It occurred on 1 July 1846 in response to the confiscation of convicts' cooking vessels under the orders of the Commandant of the penal settlement, Major Joseph Childs.

== Background ==
In February 1844, Major Childs assumed control of the convict prison settlement on Norfolk Island, implementing a regime characterised by severe discipline. This ultimately culminated in a mutiny, resulting in a massacre and the subsequent execution of thirteen men.

Childs' predecessor Captain Alexander Maconochie had regarded his prisoners as human beings and permitted them to have small garden plots in which they could grow sweet potatoes and other vegetables. Maconochie also shortened hours of labour, granted holidays for good behaviour and provided saucepans and kettles for prisoners to cook food.

Over a period of two years, Major Childs withdrew those privileges, abolishing private garden plots, lengthening daily hours of work and ending holidays for good behaviour. He cut down the prisoners' rations and in June 1846 prohibited personal cooking, ordering all kettles and saucepans held by prisoners to be handed in, and commanding that all the provisions should henceforth to be prepared at the general mess-house (known as the cookhouse).

The convicts held on Norfolk Island at this time were made up of doubly-convicted colonial prisoners and those who had been sentenced to transportation for 15 years or life in the United Kingdom. Amongst the colonial prisoners (known as 'old hands') were many inveterate law-breakers who had engaged in activities such as bushranging, cattle-thieving, robberies, burglary and piracy. These were the ‘flash-men' of the settlement who displayed extreme contempt for authority and scorned the punishments that were meted out. The elite amongst this set of hardened criminals was a group known as ‘the Ring' who dominated the other prisoners and were contemptuous of the guards and overseers who supervised them day-to-day.

The colonial prisoners normally prepared and ate their meals in the lumber-yard, adjacent to the cookhouse. On 30 June 1846 William Foster, Superintendent of Colonial Prisoners, ordered the collection and removal of cooking vessels from the lumber-yard, to be carried out in the evening after the prisoners were locked in their barracks. The subsequent search of the lumber-yard yielded a large number of cooking articles, which were placed in the Convict Barracks store.

== Rebellion ==
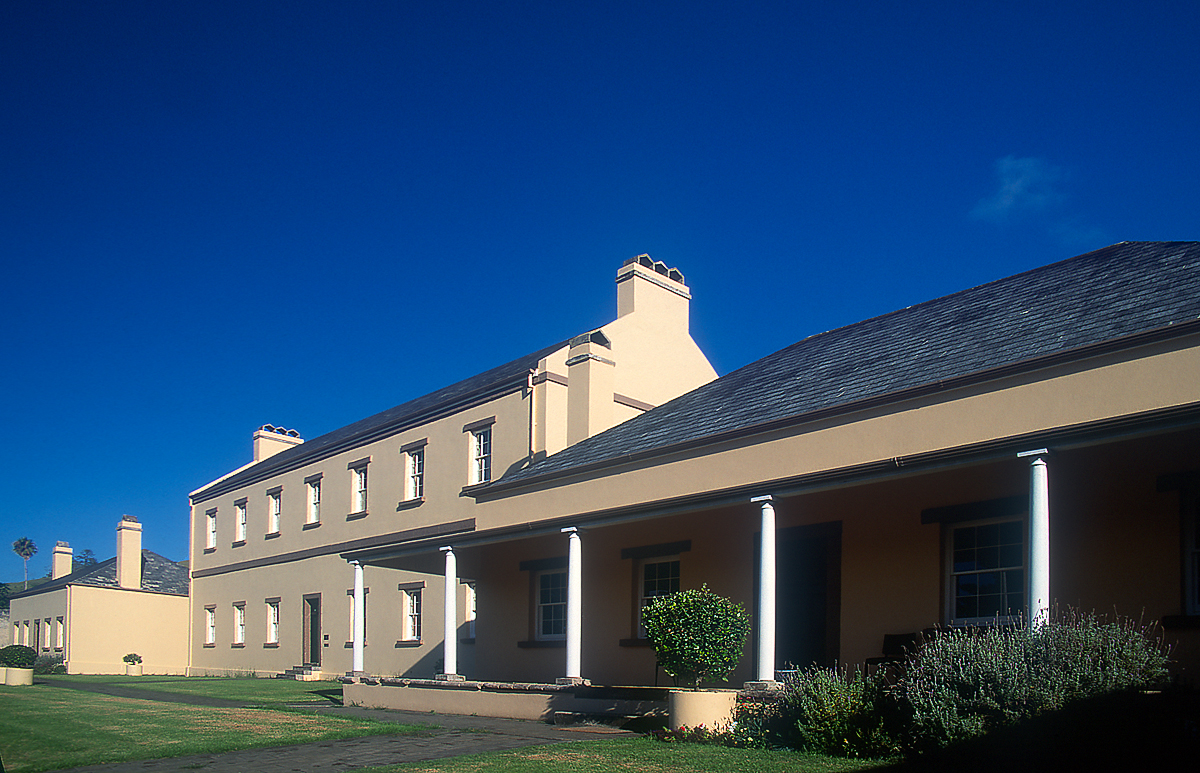
Convict barracks of the former penal settlement on Norfolk Island.

On the morning of 1 July 1846 the 'turn-out' bell rang and the convicts were assembled in the prison barrack-yard for prayers. After the prayers were read, the men were marched to the lumber-yard where they were to take their breakfast. They were accompanied by Patrick Hiney, Assistant Superintendent of Convicts, who took the muster. A group of men of 'the Ring' surrounded Hiney and complained that the kettles and cooking pans had been taken away. Hiney left the group and went to the nearby cookhouse and told the overseer, Stephen Smith, he thought trouble was brewing.

When Hiney left the cookhouse he found that a great number of the prisoners were in an agitated state. Hiney walked over to William Westwood, a former bushranger from Van Diemen's Land known as 'Jackey-Jackey'. As he began talking to Westwood, the surrounding body of prisoners, including Westwood, made a rush out of the lumber-yard to the Convict Barracks store where they retrieved the cooking utensils that had been confiscated the previous evening. What then followed was a short period of relative calm as the men returned to the lumber-yard and began cooking their breakfasts over wood fires. Hiney left to tell the overseers and constables to prepare to march the convicts to their work stations.

The period of calm was suddenly broken when somebody cried out: "Come on, we will kill the -----", and a group of men led by Westwood, grabbing pieces of wood and axes, ran for the gates of the lumber-yard. Convict Constable John Morris was stationed by his hut at the gate and was killed by Westwood with an axe blow to his head. Two other constables were knocked to the ground by the mob. The mob then rushed to the cookhouse and brutally murdered the overseer, Stephen Smith, beaten about his head with wooden billets and repeatedly stabbed with a large carving fork.

William Westwood was then reported to have shouted: "Come on you -----; follow me and you follow to the gallows". About sixty of the men rushed out of the lumber-yard following Westwood, while the rest of the prisoners remained in the yard, “fearful of the outcome of this explosion of hate and killing”. Westwood and his mob reached the first of a row of huts near the Lime-kilns (about a hundred yards from the lumber-yard) where two convict constables were asleep after coming off night-duty. Westwood entered the hut and killed John Dinon with two savage axe-blows to the sleeping man's head. Thomas Saxton woke to the noise but before he could rise, he also received a fatal blow from the axe. Then a cry went up: "Now for the Christ-killer", the prisoners' name for the hated Stipendiary Magistrate, Samuel Barrow, who was notorious for his harsh punishments and "arbitrary assertions of authority".

By this time, however, the military had been alerted to the rebellion and Captain Conran and about twenty men of the 11th Regiment were advancing towards the lumber-yard. The mob at the lime-kiln hut, seeing the armed soldiers coming, ran back to the lumber-yard hoping to merge back into the larger body of prisoners (numbering about 500). The soldiers arrived at the lumber-yard and restored order by force of arms. The prisoners were then ordered by Captain Conran to pass out of the yard one at a time, each being searched for weapons and inspected for blood on their hands or clothing. While the search was in progress additional soldiers arrived under the command of Major Harold. When it was William Westwood's turn to come out of the lumber-yard he walked over to the Major, his hands, face and shirt covered in blood, and said: "I suppose it's me you want". Those suspected of being implicated in the murders (about sixty in all) were placed in a bunch and kept under guard and the rest of the prisoners were removed to the barrack-yard.

== Aftermath ==
A difficulty arose as to where the sixty men implicated in the rebellion and murders could be securely confined. The Old Gaol on Norfolk Island was not large enough to hold them and a new jail was still under construction. It was decided to secure them in the boat-shed, a stone building opposite the settlement's guard-house. The conduct of the men chained up in the boat-shed was described as “outrageous”, behaving “more like demons than human beings” and occasionally breaking into song. Although the prisoners were securely fastened by a chain passing through their leg-irons, during their confinement stones were removed from the side of the boat-house in an attempt to break out.

On the afternoon of the uprising a Commission to investigate the insurrection was held by Major Harold, Captain Hamilton of the Royal Engineers and Samuel Barrow, the Stipendiary Magistrate. They took evidence from those who had witnessed the events and others who had been on duty at the time. During the ensuing weeks Magistrate Barrow conducted preliminary trials which reduced the number of accused principal participants of the mutiny to twenty-seven. These prisoners were transferred to the Old Gaol to await their trial.

Within ten days of the insurrection the brig Governor Phillip arrived at Norfolk Island from Van Diemen's Land with a cargo of stores for the settlement. The ship had departed before news of the mutinous outbreak reached the colony. Amongst the official despatches was one informing Major Childs that his replacement, John Price, formerly Police Magistrate at Hobart Town, was shortly to arrive at the island. The Lady Franklin sailed from Hobart Town with John Price and his family on board, departing before the Governor Phillip arrived back with the news from Norfolk Island. Also on board the Lady Franklin was Francis Burgess, a judge appointed to conduct the trials of nine convicts jailed several months previously on stabbing, robbery and "unnatural offence" charges. When they arrived at Norfolk Island the new Commandant and Judge Burgess were informed that rather than just nine, there were dozens of men to be tried.

The trials of the nine oldest cases began on July 22, conducted by Judge Burgess, and were concluded on the following day. However, the business of the Court was unable to proceed any further when the judge became seriously ill with dysentery, to the extent that his "life at one period was despaired of". Burgess returned to Hobart Town on the Lady Franklin and the trials of the mutineers were delayed until the arrival on the island of another judge.

On July 31 another murder occurred in the tense atmosphere of the penal settlement. At the Lime-kilns two prisoners named Liddle and McCarthy murdered a sub-overseer named Adam Clarke. They beat the old man to death with shovels and were in the process of throwing his body into the burning kiln when one of the overseers drew his pistol and prevented them from doing so.

Major Childs departed from Norfolk Island on 19 August 1846 aboard the Government schooner Marys, arriving in Sydney twelve days later on his way back to England.

== Trials and executions ==
The new judge, Fielding Browne, departed from Hobart Town for Norfolk Island on September 3. By this stage the accused prisoners numbered fourteen, considered to have been the ringleaders of the mutiny. The trial of the fourteen men – William Westwood, John Davies, Samuel Kenyon, Dennis Pendergrast, Owen Commuskey, Henry Whiting, William Pearson, James Cairns, William Pickthorne, Lawrence Kavenagh, John Morton, William Lloyd, William Scrimshaw, and Edward McGinnis – commenced on 23 September 1846. The trial was held in the schoolroom at the prisoners' barracks in front of a jury of seven army commissioned officers. The men were charged with murder and aiding and abetting murder and all pleaded not guilty. Witnesses gave evidence for the Crown over several days concerning John Morris' murder and in the end twelve of the accused were found guilty and sentenced to hang. Two of the fourteen, John Morton and William Lloyd, were acquitted.

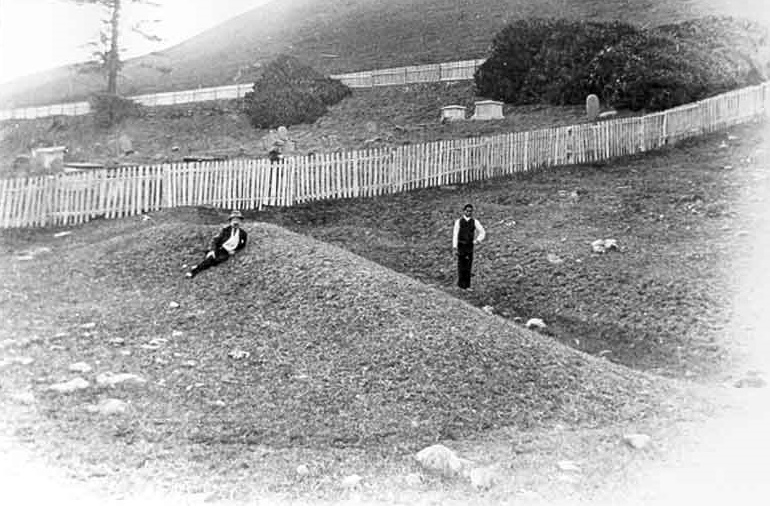
'Murderers' Mound', the last resting place of the ringleaders of the 1 July 1846 mutiny (photographed in about 1900).

The convicted men were attended by ministers of religion during their confinement. The three Protestants (Westwood, Whiting and Pickthorne) were attended by the Anglican minister, Rev. Thomas Rodgers and the Roman Catholic prisoners by Fathers Murray and Bond. Before he was executed William Westwood declared "as a dying man" to Rev. Rodgers that four of the twelve condemned men – Kavenagh, Whiting, Pickthorne and Scrimshaw – were innocent of the charges. Westwood was reported to have claimed: "I never spoke to Kavenagh on the morning of the riots; and these other three men had no part in the killing of John Morris, as far as I know of".

The executions were carried out on the morning of Tuesday 13 October 1846, in two batches of six. The gallows were erected in front of the new jail, the structure of the scaffold consisting of two beams, from which the ropes were hanging, with trapdoors that fell from each side of the centre. The first six men executed at eight o'clock were Westwood, Davis, Pickthorne, Kavenagh, Commuskey and McGinnis. An armed force of 30 soldiers were in attendance and the executions were supervised by Captain Blatchford, Superintendent of Convicts. At ten o'clock the remaining six prisoners were hanged. After each set of executions the bodies were placed in rough wooden coffins, loaded onto two bullock carts and taken to a disused saw-pit outside the cemetery where they were buried. The location of the burials, in unconsecrated ground outside the cemetery fence, is known on the island as 'Murderers' Mound'.

Subsequent to the trial of the accused ringleaders of the July 1 riot, William 'Doggie' Brown was charged with the murder of the overseer, Stephen Smith, and found guilty. Brown was executed on October 19, the thirteenth execution from the events of that day.

== Convict executions ==
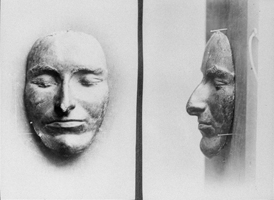
Death mask of William Westwood

=== 13 October 1846 ===
- William Westwood ('Jackey-Jackey') – aged 26 years.
- John Davies (or Davis)
- Samuel Kenyon – 29 years (born in 1817); convicted of housebreaking at the Lancaster Assizes, 21 years transportation; arrived at Sydney, New South Wales, aboard the Eden in November 1840; in April 1841 convicted at Sydney of absconding from an Iron Gang, robbery and possessing a firearm; sentenced to life on Norfolk Island.
- Dennis Pendergast
- Owen Commuskey – aged 22 years (born in 1824); shoemaker; convicted of larceny (stealing a roll of tobacco) in December 1842 in county Monaghan, Ireland, seven years transportation; arrived at Van Diemen's Land in November 1843 aboard the Orator, assigned to a station gang at Broadmarsh; absconded, probation extended February 1844; convicted of armed assault in March 1844 at Oatlands, sentenced to death, commuted to four years on Norfolk Island.
- Henry Whiting – aged 22 years.
- William Pearson
- James Cairns – 18 years (born in 1828); convicted of burglary at Liverpool Borough Quarter Sessions, sentenced to ten years transportation; arrived at Van Diemen's Land in November 1841 aboard the Lord Goderich; assigned to a work gang at Point Puer (a boys' reformatory prison near Port Arthur); in January 1846 Cairns was convicted of feloniously stabbing Thomas Brown with intent to murder, sentenced to death, commuted to life on Norfolk Island.
- William Pickthorne – aged 27 years; in October 1845 William Pickthorne and one other were convicted at Oatlands, Van Diemen's Land, of breaking and entering a dwelling at Campbell Town and stealing two table covers and “other articles”, sentenced to transportation for life.
- Lawrence Kavenagh – aged about 41 years.
- William Scrimshaw – aged 27 years (born in 1820 in Liverpool, England); convicted at Worcester Quarter Sessions in July 1832 for stealing a coat, sentenced to seven years transportation; arrived in January 1834 in Van Diemen's Land on the Southworth, assigned to Port Arthur; freed by servitude and returned to England; seaman on the ship Britannia; arrested and convicted in May 1842 in Sydney, New South Wales, for stealing a watch, sentenced to 14 years and sent to Van Diemen's Land, assigned to Port Arthur; in August 1844 Scrimshaw and five others stole a whale-boat and absconded from Port Arthur, rowed to Adventure Bay and robbed Richard Griffiths' whaling station at knife-point; they were eventually captured at Port Sorell after a journey of nearly four hundred miles; each were convicted in January 1845 of robbery and “putting in bodily fear”; sentenced to death, commuted to life, sent to Norfolk Island.
- Edward McGinniss

=== 19 October 1846 ===
- William Brown ('Doggie')

== Victims ==
- John Morris (convict constable) – a native of Launceston, county Cornwall in England; he had previously been a convict overseer at Port Arthur where (as claimed by Martin Cash) "he rendered himself notorious for his cruelty and treachery to prisoners."
- Stephen Smith (free overseer)
- Thomas Saxton (convict constable) – arrived at Norfolk Island as a convict (convicted for life at the Derby Quarter Sessions); he departed from England on 26 August 1843 aboard the Maitland with 195 other convicts, arriving at Norfolk Island on 7 February 1844; by June 1846 Saxton held the position of Convict Constable at the penal settlement.
- John Dinon (convict constable) – born in 1820 at Tuamgraney, county Clare, Ireland; enlisted in the British Army in March 1837 (19th Regiment of Foot) and posted to Malta in 1840; court-martialled in August 1842 for striking a sergeant, sentenced to transportation for life; imprisoned at Plymouth aboard the convict hulk Stirling Castle; transported to Norfolk Island aboard the Maitland, arriving in February 1844; to serve probation for 30 months; by June 1846 Dinon held the position of Convict Constable at the penal settlement.

== See also ==
- History of Norfolk Island
- Norfolk Island convict mutinies
