= Abraham Fleming =

English writer and clergyman (c. 1552–1607)

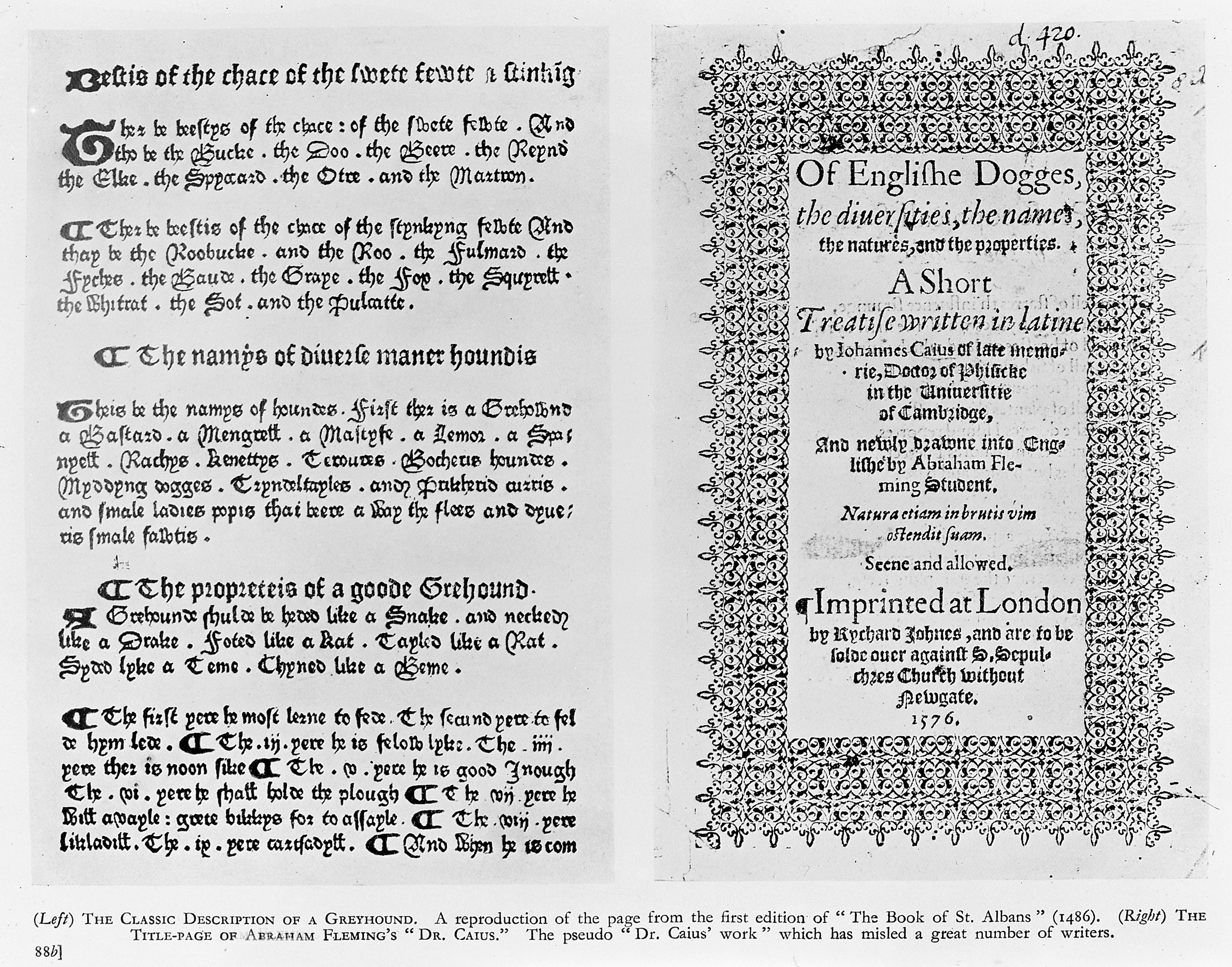
Of English Dogges, 1576

Abraham Fleming (Flemyng, c. 1552–18 September 1607) was an English clergyman. He was a prolific writer and translator, who contributed to others' texts. He was also an editor and poet, serving as a chief to the second edition of Holinshed's Chronicles (1587). Fleming was a manuscript collector. By the 1730s, Fleming's collection was owned by Francis Peck. Its subsequent fate is unclear.

== Life ==
Most likely to have been born in Holborn, London, between 1548 and 1552, Fleming matriculated at Peterhouse, Cambridge as a sizar (a poor student performing duties in return for his tuition) in November 1570, and graduated with a B.A. in 1582. It is likely that Fleming interspersed his studies at Cambridge with extended visits in London to write and translate popular texts on a range of themes, some of which remain in print today. He began his career in spectacular style, becoming the first person to translate a complete Virgilian text (the "Bucoliks" or Eclogues) into English in 1575. He followed this the same year with another complete translation of "Bucoliks", this time in verse. Later in his career Fleming was called upon by other authors to write recommendations for their books and worked alongside notable authors such as George Whetston, Barnabe Googe and Reginald Scot; many of Elizabethan London's leading printers called on Fleming to edit or embellish pre-production texts and he established a network of contacts. He is best known for his once disputed but now acknowledged role as chief editor of and major contributor to the second edition of Holinshed's Chronicles (1587).

Throughout his life Fleming was a godly Protestant. He took holy orders in August 1588 and was ordained deacon and priest by Dr Richard Fletcher at Peterborough Cathedral. Almost as soon as he was ordained Fleming became chaplain to Charles Howard, Lord High Admiral of England, and not chaplain to Catherine Countess of Nottingham as previously thought, although among his papers were prayers said to the Howard family when they were together; in the 1590s Fleming was called as a witness in a court case and stated his occupation as chaplain to Lord Howard. Another error in previous articles about Fleming was that he was an antiquary; he was never a member of the Society of Antiquaries and while he did amass a collection of manuscripts, his motivation for collecting them was not consistent with those of an antiquary. As well as performing the duties of a private chaplain, Fleming was a curate at St Nicholas's Church, Deptford assisting Reverend Thomas Macander (who buried Christopher Marlowe on 1 June 1593, and possibly Fleming assisted with this burial). Between 1589 and 1606 he preached eight times at St Paul's Cross, further evidence that he was a trusted "establishment man"; the sermons are now lost. On 19 October 1593 he was collated by Archbishop John Whitgift to the rectory of St Pancras, Soper Lane, London. He took his work as a rector as seriously as he did his writing; Fleming saw his parish through at least two plagues.

Fleming died at Bottesford, Leicestershire, on 18 September 1607, while on a visit to his brother Samuel, the rector of that parish, and was buried under the chancel inside the church. Despite Fleming's humble origins, his coffin was interred with those of the earls of Rutland. A memorial plaque bearing an epitaph poem written by Fleming marks the approximate site. He was survived by his brother Reverend Samuel Fleming and his sister Hester. Perhaps Fleming's greatest legacy is the fifty known books that he wrote, translated or contributed to.

== Selected works ==
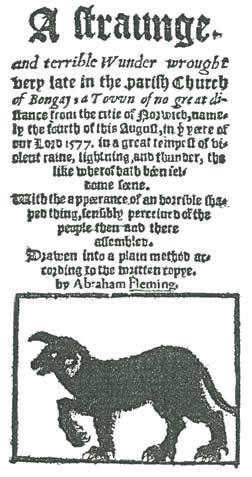
A straunge and terrible Wunder

Most of his manuscript collections were in 1732 in the possession of Francis Peck, who intended to print them in the second volume of his Desiderata Curiosa. They cannot now be traced. Fifty-nine titles are listed in Cooper's 'Athenae Cantabrigienses', including:

- 'Virgil's Eclogues, translated into English Verse,' London, 1575, and with the 'Georgics,' 1589.
- 'The Bukolikes of P. Virgilius Maro . . . Drawne into plaine and familiar English Verse,' London, 1575.
- 'A Panoplie of Epistles, or, a Looking-Glasse for the Vnlearned. Conteyning a perfecte plattforme of inditing letters of all sorts,' London, 1576; a translation from the Latin.
- 'A Register of Hystories,' from the Greek of Aelianus, London, 1576.
- 'Of English Dogges,' from the Latin of John Caius, London, 1576.
- 'A Straunge and Terrible Wunder wrought very late in the Parish Church of Bongay .... the fourth of this August 1577, in a great tempest of violent raine, lightning, and thunder . . . With the appearance of a horrible-shaped Thing, sensibly perceived of the people then and there assembled,' London, 1577; reprinted, London, 1826.
- 'Of all Biasing Starrs in Generall,' from the Latin of Frederick Nause, bishop of Vienna, London, 1577.
- 'Historie of Leander and Hero,' written by Musaeus. Translation, published about 1577.
- 'Jerom of Ferrara his meditations, on the 51 & 31 Psalms; translated and augmented,' London, n. d., and 1588. Licensed in 1578.
- 'A Paradoxe, proving by reason and example that baldnesse is much better than bushie haire, &c. Written by that excellent philosopher Synesius, or (as some say) Cyren. A prettie pamphlet to pervse, and replenished with recreation. Englished by Abraham Fleming. Herevnto is annexed the pleasant tale of Hemetes the Heremite, pronounced before the Queens Maiestie. Newly recognised both in Latine and Englishe, by the said A.F., ' London, 1579. The tale of Hermetes is, with a few verbal changes, that which George Gascoigne presented to Queen Elizabeth.
- 'Fred. Nawse, his generall Doctrine of Earthquakes,' translated, London, 1580. The translator has added a history of earthquakes in England from the time of William the Conqueror to the last earthquake on 6 April 1580.
- 'A Memoriall of the Famous Monumentes and Charitable Almes Deedes of the Right Worshipfull Mr. Willm. Lambe . . . who deceased the xxi. of April 1580,' London, 1580.
- 'The Footpath to Felicitie,' London, 1581, reprinted in 'The Diamond of Deuotion,' 1586.
- 'A Monomachie of Motives in the mind of man: Or a battell between Vertues & Vices of contrarie qualitie,' newly Englished, London, 1582.
- 'Verborvm Latinorvm cvm Graecis Anglicisqve conivnctorvm locupletissimi Commentary,' London, 1583.
- Poetical translations for Reginald Scot's 'Discoverie of Witchcraft,' 1584.
- 'A Shorte Dictionarie in Latine and English,' London, 1586 and 1594.
- 'The Diamond of Deuotion; cut and squared into sixe severall pointes: namelie (1) The Footpath of Felicitie; (2) A Guide to Godlines; (3) The Schoole of Skill; (4) A Swarme of Bees; (5) A Plant of Pleasure; (6) A Grove of Graces. Full of manie fruitfull lessons auailable vnto the leading of a godlie and reformed life,' London, 1586.
- 'The Historie of England, . . . &c. By Raphael Holinshed. Now newlie digested, &c. by Abr. Fleming.' In the first volume of Holinshed's 'Chronicles,' 1587. The third volume of the same edition was enlarged by Fleming with interpolations from the collections of Francis Thynne, the abridgment of R. Grafton, and the summary of John Stow.
- 'The Bucoliks of Publius Virgilius Maro, Prince of all Latine Poets . . . Together with his Georgiks or Ruralls, otherwise called his husbandrie, conteyning foure books. All newly translated into English verse,' London, 1589, dedicated to Archbishop John Whitgift. This version of the 'Bucolics' is not the same as that published by Fleming in 1575.
- Historical and miscellaneous articles in manuscript enumerated in Peck's Desiderata Curiosa.
- 'The conduit of comfort Containing sundrie comfortable prayers, to the strengthening of the faith of a weak Christian.' London 1579 and 1624 .
