= Bottesford, Leicestershire =

Village in North Leicestershire, England

Coordinates: 52.9375°N 0.8020°W

Bottesford
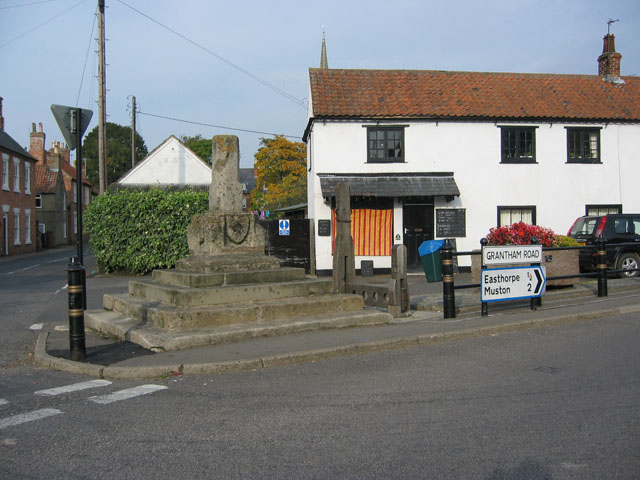
- Bottesford Market Cross

- Location within Leicestershire
- Population: 3,587 (2011)
- OS grid reference: SK8038
- Civil parish: Bottesford
- District: Melton
- Shire county: Leicestershire
- Region: East Midlands
- Country: England
- Sovereign state: United Kingdom
- Post town: NOTTINGHAM
- Postcode district: NG13
- Dialling code: 01949
- Police: Leicestershire
- Fire: Leicestershire
- Ambulance: East Midlands
- UK Parliament: Melton and Syston

Bottesford is a village and civil parish in the Borough of Melton, Leicestershire, England, close to the boundaries with Nottinghamshire and Lincolnshire.

== Location ==
Bottesford is about 15 miles (24 km) east of Nottingham, 13 miles (21 km) north of Melton Mowbray and 7 miles (11 km) west of Grantham. The village is the largest in the Vale of Belvoir; it is near Belvoir Castle, home of the Duke and Duchess of Rutland. It had a population of 3,587 at the 2011 census, estimated in 2018 at 3,382. It borders smaller parishes in Leicestershire, Lincolnshire and Nottinghamshire, such as Redmile, Sedgebrook, Orston and Elton on the Hill.

The local amenities include a post office, a railway station, a library, a church, a convenience store, three restaurants and three pubs: The Bull Inn, The Rutland Arms, and The Thatch.

== Name ==
Bottesford derives its name from the Anglo-Saxon "Ford belonging to the botl" (house). The ford was over the River Devon. Bottesford is listed in the 1086 Domesday Book as "Botesford", in the hundred of Framland. Historically, Bottesford was closely associated with the Earls and Dukes of Rutland.

== History ==
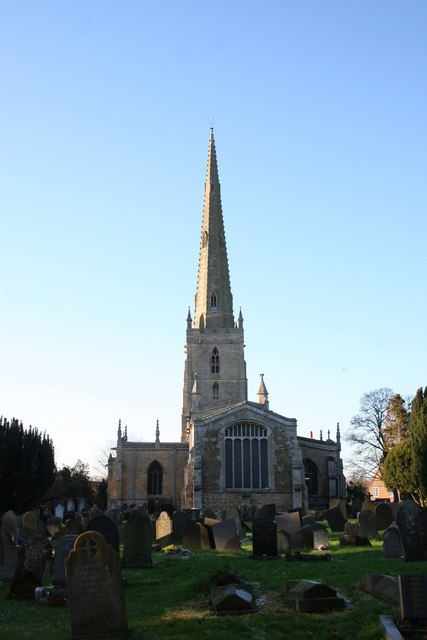
St Mary's Church

The village was built along the River Devon (pronounced Dee-von) and named after the ford at the centre of the village. St Mary the Virgin's Church, sometimes known as the "Lady of the Vale", is a large medieval church at the centre of the village. Like many churches, this was built over centuries in mixed architectural styles. The lower part of the chancel dates from the 12th century, with the remainder added over the next 300 years. The nave roof was finally completed in 1740. The octagonal crocketed spire is thought to be the tallest in the county, at 210 feet (64 metres). There are two gargoyles on the south transept. A headstone to Thomas Parker and a table tomb in the churchyard are both Grade II listed, as are the gate piers and gates to the churchyard to the north. The church is the burial place of several earls of Rutland. One Rutland tomb is famous for an inscription that attributes a death to witchcraft by the Witches of Belvoir. Most of the church dates from the 15th century, but the chancel was rebuilt in the 17th century to accommodate the Rutland monuments. These fill the chancel and give a view of changing aristocratic taste in the 16th and 17th centuries. After the Manners family gained the dukedom of Rutland in 1703, they built a mausoleum in the grounds of Belvoir Castle, the family home, where all the dukes have been buried.

There is a local website covering many sides of Bottesford's local history, including mounting evidence of occupation in Roman times and earlier. Bottesford was the venue of one of the country's early friendly societies, thought to have been founded in the 1750s. It provided members with sickness and funeral benefits for over 200 years. Eleven contributors from the history group produced in 2009 a book on the local history since 1850.

From December 1941, there was a Second World War RAF Bomber Command airfield to the north near Long Bennington, called RAF Bottesford. Initially it hosted No. 3 Group RAF; then after serving USAAF's IX Troop Carrier Command for D-Day, it was used by No. 5 Group from late 1944. It is no longer used as an airfield, but the runways can still be seen.

Entertainers Laurel and Hardy stayed for Christmas 1952 at the Bull Inn, where the landlady was Stan Laurel's sister Olga. They were appearing at the Empire Theatre in Nottingham at the time. There is a plaque recording this on the building.

There were two brickyards at Beckinthorpe in the 19th century, one also producing the unique Bottesford Blue pantiles to be seen on some local buildings. Local employment declined in the 20th century. The four pubs, six restaurants, at least 16 retailers and 20 odd small producers and service providers today are one-person or family concerns. Not so the earlier building firm of William Roberts Ltd. Joseph William Roberts (1917–2009) was born and bred in Sutton-cum-Granby, then schooled in Granby, Nottinghamshire and in Bottesford. He moved to the latter and started his firm in 1937, aged 20. It employed over 500 people at one time and branched out as a funeral undertaker.

== Character and appearance ==
The village is somewhat unusual in Leicestershire. Its buildings reflect the traditions of neighbouring Nottinghamshire and Lincolnshire, as well as local influences, using local materials, initially locally quarried ironstone, but latterly local bricks and distinctive roofing tiles.

There are several open areas in the village, notably an area to the north-east of the churchyard, the churchyard itself, and an area of trees to the south of Devon Lane. Trees form a major part of the street scene in most of Bottesford.

The River Devon flows through the village, almost encircling the church. Along its banks in the centre of the village, the soil is a pebbly material known locally as running sand. Views within the village tend to be intimate and enclosed, though the wider Grantham Road provides a slightly extended view out of the village towards Grantham.

Bottesford's many listed buildings include the grade I listed 13th-century Church of St Mary the Virgin. There are two scheduled monuments within the village: Fleming's Bridge and the stone cross in the Market Place. The stocks and whipping post are Grade II listed. One of the Grade II listed buildings, Providence Cottage in Rectory Lane, is dated 1723 in burnt bricks on the eastern elevation, where the initials REH set into wall. The roof is now pantiled, but the slope suggests it was thatched in times gone by. The Duke of Rutland's Almshouse, also Grade II listed, was begun in 1590 and was a home for elderly local men called bedesmen (i. e. almsmen; originally, chantrymen), having once been a hospital. The building has two M-shaped roofs of differing pitches, both with concrete tiles dating from 1985. The Rectory, Grade II listed, is an ironstone and brick building dated 1708, enlarged in the 19th century and altered in 1988. It stands in Rectory Lane behind wrought iron gates, amid large, landscaped gardens, and has a slate roof. The police station, in Queen Street, is likewise Grade II listed and dates from 1846. It is in red brick with a slate roof and three bays. The central bay projects under a pediment and the building is an early example of a purpose-built police station. Market Street is the location of the Grade II listed Dr Fleming's House, which was once a terrace of women's almshouses built in ironstone and mainly rebuilt in brick in the late 18th century. A stone plaque over a door reads "Dr. Fleming's Hospital 1620". There are several Grade II listed properties in High Street, including the Thatched Restaurant, set back from the road in spacious grounds and the only remaining thatched building in the village.

There are many other listed buildings within the conservation area.

== Governance ==
Bottesford is in the Melton borough of Leicestershire and in the Melton and Syston constituency. The current Member of Parliament is the Conservative Edward Argar.

The civil parish includes the villages of Bottesford, Easthorpe (directly adjacent to Bottesford), Muston and Normanton. The parish council has nine members.

== Transport ==
The village is served by Bottesford railway station on the Nottingham, Grantham and Skegness line. There are also No. 24 and 26 buses, which run to Melton Mowbray at least every two hours, and other services to Grantham and Bingham.

The village was bypassed by the A52 road in February 1989 at a cost of £3 million at the time.

== Landmarks ==
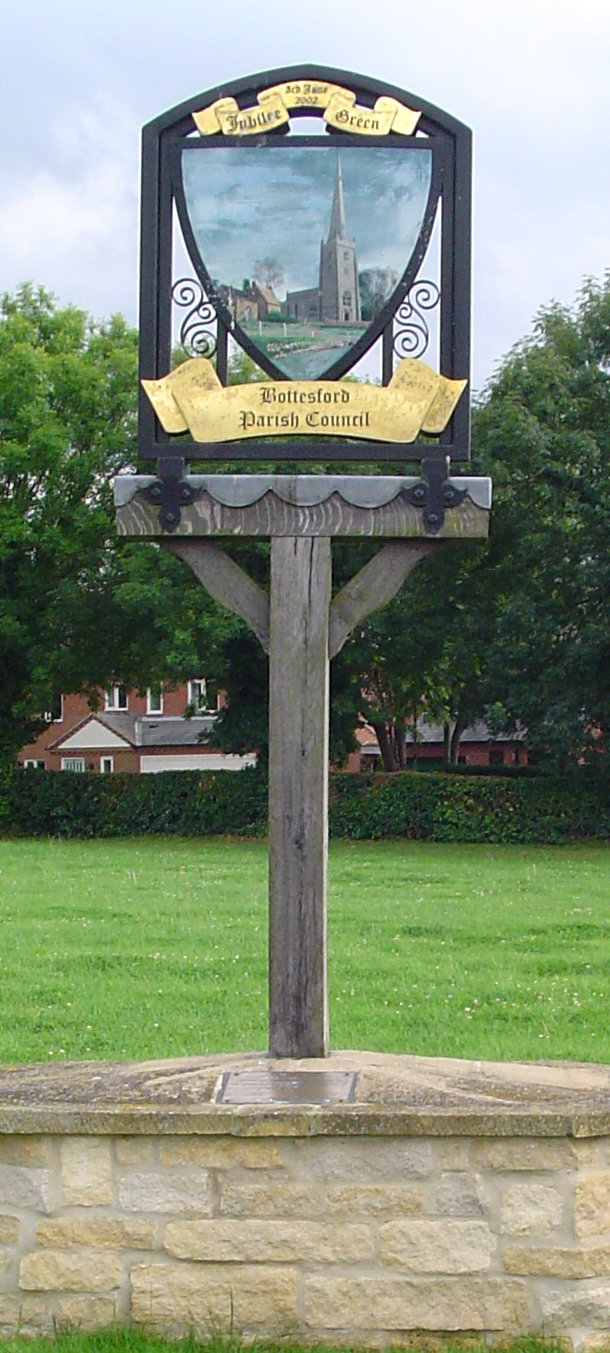
Village sign in Bottesford

The Victory Commemoration (or VC) Hall is the local name for Bottesford Old Village Hall. The name came about because some of the funds used to buy up the original hall came from leftover money raised in the village during the Second World War to send parcels to those serving in the armed forces.

A new village hall was built in 2003, mainly funded by a grant from Awards for All (Lottery) and local contributions. To mark the celebration of the Golden Jubilee of Elizabeth II in 2002, several large developments in Bottesford include the creation of a memorial green. One of the 2010 Low Carbon Awards given by the Royal Institute of British Architects went to a house in Bottesford designed by architects Allan Mulcahy.

== Clubs and groups ==
The clubs in the village include two for badminton, a bowling club, a cricket and social club, four football clubs, several sections of the Scout and Guides movement, and many other associations and events such as a youth club catering for 11 to 19-year-olds and a skate park. The village has several charity groups raising funds mainly to provide for new facilities locally. One group raising funds in Bottesford in particular is the Vale of Belvoir Lions.

Local community information has appeared since 2002 in the Village Voice newsletter, which is delivered free to every house.

== Education ==
Bottesford has a playgroup and a primary school – Bottesford Primary School – and a secondary school – The Priory Belvoir Academy. The latter had its first group of year 10s in 2008, having expanded from being a middle school that year. This initially controversial change was hailed as a success after the schools inspectorate Ofsted rated Belvoir as Outstanding in its 2010 inspection report. It was rated Good in leadership, behaviour, teaching and achievement, and Outstanding in sixth-form provision in its most recent Ofsted report.

There is a public library in the Old School, Grantham Road.

== Places of worship ==
There are Church of England churches in Bottesford (St Mary's) and Muston (St John the Baptist). The poet George Crabbe (1754–1832) moved to Muston Rectory from Stathern in 1789, remaining as incumbent of Muston and of West Allington, Lincolnshire, until 1792. His Natural History of the Vale of Belvoir was a pioneering study of the district.

Bottesford Methodist Church in Devon Lane belongs to the Grantham and Vale of Belvoir Methodist Circuit. The Baptist Church is in Queen Street.

== Notable people ==
In birth order

- Thomas Manners, 1st Earl of Rutland (died 1543), courtier and soldier, was buried in Bottesford.
- Abraham Fleming (died 1607), cleric, writer and translator, died in Bottesford. His brother Samuel was Rector here in 1581–1620.
- Edward Manners, 3rd Earl of Rutland (died 1587), public official, was buried in Bottesford, as were the other earls of Rutland up to John Manners, 8th Earl of Rutland (died 1679), politician.
- Joan Flower (died 1619) of Bottesford and her daughters Margaret (executed 1619) and Philippa were among the ostensible Witches of Belvoir and tried as such.
- Henry Beresford Garrett (baptised Henry Rouse in Bottesford in 1818), committed several violent crimes in New Zealand and Australia.
- William Antliff (born 1848), a Derbyshire county cricket player, was born in Bottesford.
- John Parnham (born 1856), a professional cricketer active in the 1880s, was born in Bottesford.
- Willie Young (born 1951), a Scottish footballer who appeared 237 times for Arsenal F.C., now owns a dog kennels in Bottesford.
- Robert Harris (born 1957), novelist and broadcaster, attended Belvoir High School.
- Luke Wright (born 1985), an England all-round cricketer, was born in Bottesford.

== Crime victim ==
Ten-year-old Rosie May Storrie of Bottesford was murdered during a house party in Normanton on 30 December 2003, two days after she had made her first stage appearance as a dancer in a pantomime. She was found by other guests smothered and partly stripped, and died in hospital 36 hours later. A fellow guest, Paul Smith of Sedgebrook, aged 18, was convicted of the murder. Smith, who had been diagnosed with Asperger syndrome and had a history of violence against girls, was sentenced to life imprisonment with a minimum term of fourteen years.

The Rosie May Storrie Memorial Fund established by her parents raised over £270,000 towards charity work with children, notably a Rosie May Children's Home at Boossa, Galle, Sri Lanka.
