= Manuden =

Village in Essex, England

Coordinates: 51.9188856°N 0.1671845°E

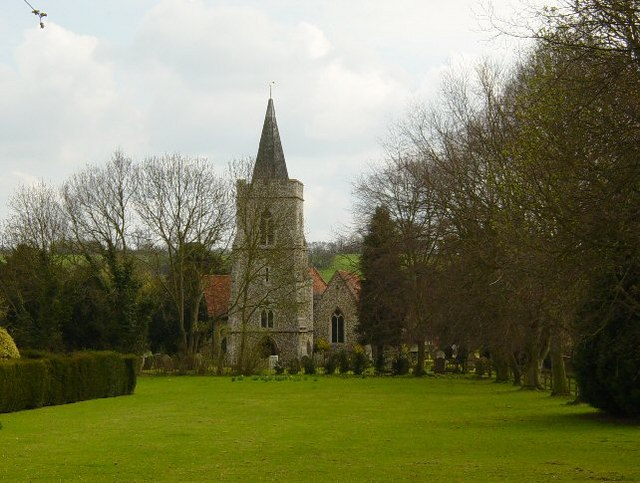
- St. Mary the Virgin, Manuden

- Location within Essex
- Population: 721 (Parish, 2021)
- OS grid reference: TL491266
- Civil parish: Manuden
- District: Uttlesford
- Shire county: Essex
- Region: East
- Country: England
- Sovereign state: United Kingdom
- Post town: BISHOP'S STORTFORD
- Postcode district: CM23
- Dialling code: 01279
- Police: Essex
- Fire: Essex
- Ambulance: East of England
- UK Parliament: Saffron Walden

Manuden is a village and civil parish in the Uttlesford district of Essex, England. It is located around 3 1/2 miles (6 km) north of Bishop's Stortford, its post town, which is in the neighbouring county of Hertfordshire, and around 8 miles (13 km) south-west of Saffron Walden. It has a parish council. At the 2021 census the parish had a population of 721.

Manuden is mentioned in the Domesday Book of 1086 as one of the settlements within Clavering hundred.

Part of Manuden is designated as a conservation area, with several listed buildings in and around the village.

The local church is St Mary the Virgin. A tablet within the church commemorates the Jacobean statesman and diplomat William Wade, who spent his retirement at Battles Hall in the village, and is buried in the church.

There is a primary school in the village. In 2010, Manuden County Primary School topped the league table for English schools at KS2 with all pupils attaining level 5 in both English and maths.

There are several active village organisations, including a local history society, junior football club and a cricket club.

== See also ==
- The Hundred Parishes
