= Thomas Rogers (deacon) =

Thomas George Rogers (1806–1903) was an Australian clergyman best known for his criticism of the convict settlement on Norfolk Island. He was the inspiration for the character Reverend North in the book For the Term of His Natural Life.
