= John Giles Price =

Australian convict administrator

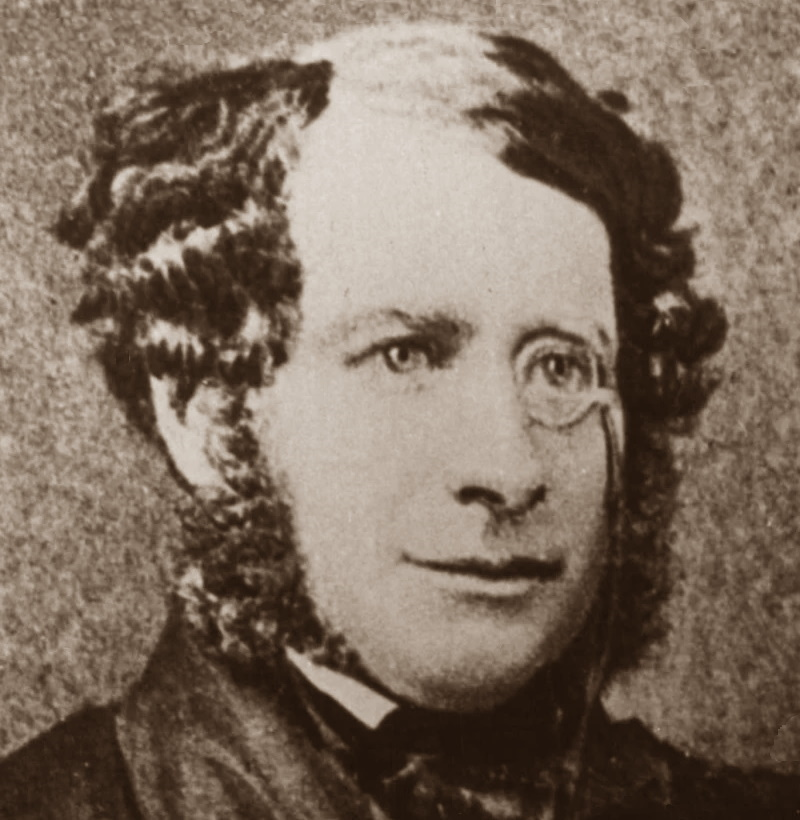
- Born: 20 October 1808; Trengwainton, Cornwall, England
- Died: 27 March 1857; Williamstown, Victoria, Australia
- Occupation: Colonial administrator

John Giles Price (20 October 1808 – 27 March 1857), was a colonial administrator in Australia. He served as the Civil Commandant of the convict settlement at Norfolk Island from August 1846 to January 1853, and later as Inspector-General of penal establishments in Victoria, during which he was "stoned to death" by angry and disgruntled prisoners.

Price had aristocratic connections which aided him in securing the position. Although he was initially seen as restoring order after an incompetent predecessor, Price scoffed at the idea of rehabilitation for convicts. An enthusiasm for flogging for trivial breaches of discipline and extreme corporal punishments of his own devising led to his regime being denounced. He left to farm, but was given responsibility for another prison in which his strongly punitive measures provoked a violent reaction.

== Biography ==
=== Early life ===
John Giles Price was born in October 1808 at Trengwainton, Cornwall, the fourth son of Sir Rose Price (1st Baronet) and his wife Elizabeth, daughter of Charles Lambart (and sister of Frances, wife of the second Earl Talbot). His family had been major slave-owners in Jamaica during the eighteenth century; John's father Rose Price was the grandson of Sir Charles Price, at one time probably the richest man on the island, owning 1,800 slaves and 26,000 acres of sugar cane. Price studied at Charterhouse public school and Brasenose College, Oxford without taking a degree.

Price’s father owned extensive landed estates in Cornwall and Jamaica. Sir Rose Price died in September 1834 and his will was disputed by Charles, the eldest surviving son, subsequent to which the whole of the estate was submitted for arbitration to the Court of Chancery. As the third eldest surviving son, John Price became dissatisfied with the delay in resolving his inheritance and the uncertainty of his prospects. He determined “to make an independent start in the world” and successfully applied for an amount of one thousand pounds from the estate in order that he might “carve out his own fortunes”. Price decided to use these funds to become a landholder in the Australian colony of Van Diemen’s Land.

=== Van Diemen's Land ===
John Giles Price arrived at Hobart Town in May 1836 bearing letters of introduction from influential relatives. The temperate rainforests in the region near the mouth of the Huon River “attracted his attention to their luxuriant growth, and the quality of their timbers”. Price purchased land on the Huon River, about 30 miles south-west of Hobart (near the present town of Franklin) and remote from the more settled districts. With the convict labour assigned to him he began felling timber. Price prepared boards of the local conifer, now known as Huon pine (Lagarostrobos franklinii), to be tested by a Scottish shipwright who confirmed their “future value for ship-planking”. By 1838 Price had a timber gang at work on his estate. Around the same time, Price was leasing land in Lindisfarne, a suburb on the eastern shore of the River Derwent where he was growing crops, building a residence for himself, and operating a lime quarry, presumably the one at in the adjacent suburb of Geilston Bay which was referred to as "Mr. Price's quarry" in several contemporary references (e.g. this 1843 account, which locates the quarry at "James's Bay", an old name for Geilston Bay).

In June 1838 Price married Mary, eldest daughter of Major James Franklin (1st Bengal Cavalry) and the niece of Sir John Franklin, Lieutenant-Governor of Van Diemen's Land from 1836 to 1843. The couple eventually had eight children (four boys and four girls), two of whom died as children.

In January 1839 Price was appointed Assistant Police Magistrate and Muster Master of convicts at Hobart Town. Soon after his appointment Price attracted controversy when he observed a man, who was driving a horse and cart, applying the whip in a severe manner to the animal. The man was summoned for the offence to appear at the Police Office where Price “acted as accuser, witness, and judge”. A newspaper report of the case commented that the actions of the Assistant Police Magistrate indicated “a degree of imprudence, and savours a little of the love of shewing power – a weakness which beginners ought to contend against”. By August 1841 Price had been appointed to the position of Police Magistrate. In November 1842 the Colonial Times newspaper, referring to John Price, stated that “the severity with which the holders of tickets-of-leave are treated by the Police Magistrate of Hobart Town has long been a matter of painful notoriety”. Towards the end of his tenure on the Bench of Magistrates Price was described as “our active and well-drilled and drilling Police Magistrate”. In April 1846 Price applied for a leave of absence for reasons of health, with Dr. Bedford warning that "he should absent himself from business or else he will be laid up seriously". The leave was granted but circumstances intervened before Price could take advantage of it.

On 6 July 1846 John Price was appointed Civil Commandant of the Norfolk Island penal settlement, to replace Major Joseph Childs who had been suspended after a serious mutinous disturbance on the island. In mid-July 1846 a testimonial was presented to John Price, including a subscription of £150 contributed by the "influential gentlemen" of Hobart Town, in “admiration of the manner in which he had performed his duties”.

=== Civil Commandant on Norfolk Island ===
John Price and his family sailed for Norfolk Island on 22 July 1846. One of John Price's first duties was to arrange for the trial of 26 convicts alleged to have been involved in murders during the 'cooking pot uprising' of 1 July 1846 at the end of Childs' administration. Twelve convicts were hanged in October, and five others shortly after. The executions broke the power of the feared 'Ring' clique of inmates. Price was a tall burly man who affected an extravagant style of dress and used underworld slang. He openly announced his intention was to break the inmates and went among them with few guards to emphasise his dominance, although he also carried two pepper-box pistols.

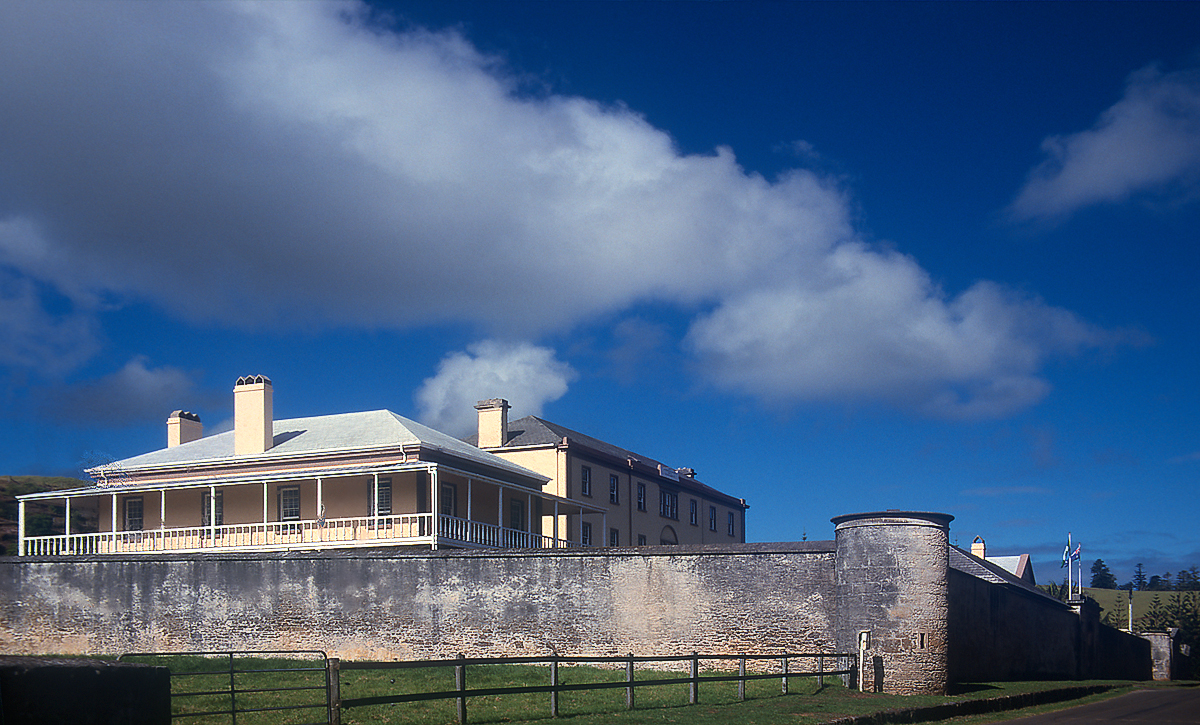
Norfolk Island gaol (photographed in 2007).

Price's ability to speak the argot of the criminal underworld made a deep impression on convicts and some thought he must have actually been imprisoned himself. A critic, Reverend Thomas Rogers, said that he would disguise himself as a constable and move around Hobart, seeking disorderly characters. Hazzard claims that "he seemed to know, with terrifying accuracy, the way a criminal's mind worked, and this, coupled with his merciless administering of the Law, gave him an almost hypnotic power over them".

Backed by Governor Denison, Price was answerable to no one but himself and he invented a series of punishments to cow his wards. Routine work cutting coral was done while chained to 36lb weights. Inmates were subject to flogging for the slightest infraction, and putting balm on a flogged man's wounds became an offence. His innovative corporal punishments included much use of restraints such as a cage over the head with a prong that immobilised the tongue and made breathing difficult, or an all encompassing steel frame that men were kept in for more than a week.

By 1852, public disquiet caused Denison to privately remonstrate with Price. Hughes' claims that, in Hobart "the suspicion that the commandant was out of control, that the island's remoteness from Hobart had permitted some cancer of his soul to metastasise wildly, could not entirely be allayed". He hints at a connection between Price's unspecified illness in 1846, and "the morbid ferocities of his rule".

Price "ruled by terror, informers and the lash" according to one modern writer, a contemporary historian noted the "merciless exercise of his authority". Bishop Robert Willson, following his third visit to the island in 1852, described the harsh punishment of the convicts. He observed "the state of the yard, from the blood running down men's backs, mingled with the water used in washing them when taken down from the triangle – the degrading scene of a large number of men … waiting their turn to be tortured, and the more humiliating spectacle presented by those who had undergone the scourging … were painful to listen to". When Willson asked Price to explain the increased use of corporal punishment, the commandant "defended his use of flogging, to which he professed great aversion, as necessary to enforce obedience to regulations, especially those controlling the use of tobacco".

Price returned to Hobart in January 1853 as the British government intended to abandon Norfolk Island.

=== Inspector-General of Penal Establishments ===
In January 1854 Price was appointed as the Inspector-General of Penal Establishments in the colony of Victoria.

In November 1856 an article was published in The Age newspaper critical of Price's management of the Penal Department. The Inspector-General's "avowed principles of penal discipline" were summarised as: "first, that the reformation of a criminal is hopeless; and secondly, that extreme severity is the only method by which criminals can be governed". It was claimed that Price "considers himself as having been specially chosen by our Government for the purpose of carrying out his system, in all its dreadful mercilessness". The article concluded that Price's methods "cannot be tolerated in this civilised community" and urged the Government to subject "Price and his system to a rigid public scrutiny".

=== Death ===
On 26 March 1857 Price visited prison hulk convicts working in a quarry at Williamstown. Accompanied by a small number of guards, the Inspector-General went toward the men but his party was quickly surrounded by about a hundred inmates. Price had been standing on the tramway of the bayside quarry where the prisoners were working, hearing complaints about rations, when he was attacked. A number of the prisoners overpowered him and “dragged him down the side of the earthwork opposite the Bay, out of sight of the guard, felled him to the ground, and battered his head with large stones”. His guards broke and ran from a barrage of rocks. Price also tried to escape but he was knocked down and severely battered with the iron bars and hammers of the workers. He died the next day.

Price’s body was placed in a lead coffin and remained in the Williamstown Stockade until the day of the funeral. At noon on Monday 30 March 1857 the coffin was conveyed by boat to Sandridge Pier and thence to Melbourne. A procession was formed at Prince's Bridge and passed through Swanston, Collins and Elizabeth streets to the Melbourne General Cemetery. The hearse was preceded by Price’s three sons in a "mourning carriage". Other mourners included the Governor of Victoria, "the warders of the various penal establishments, members of the Yeomanry Corps, and a long retinue of friends of the deceased in carriages, horseback, and on foot". A reference to Price’s funeral in The Age newspaper described it thus: "upon the whole it was eminently formal and official – not eliciting a scintilla of popular sympathy". On the day of the funeral, Justice Robert Molesworth "offered to adjourn the Supreme Court in order to let the bar attend the procession if they pleased; but not a single gentleman rose from his seat".

At the following inquest, fifteen convicts were tried for murder and seven were hanged. The seven executed convicts were: Thomas Williams, Henry Smith (alias Brennan) and Thomas Moloney (hanged on 28 April 1857); Francis Brannigan, William Brown and Richard Bryant (hanged on 29 April 1857); and John Chisley (hanged on 30 April 1857).

== Literary legacy ==
Price has, in Hughes' opinion, "remained one of the durable ogres of the Australian imagination", featuring in Price Warung's tales and as the basis for the cruel commandant Maurice Frere in Marcus Clarke's For the Term of his Natural Life (1885). Hazzard calls him "a rock of a man against whom some might lean with confidence; others he might crush without pity", while his biographer concludes that "he was a man of great personal strength and considerable courage, and was capable of sentimental as well as merciless deeds".

Price is featured as the villain in T.S. Flynn's historical novel, Part an Irishman: The Regiment, published in 2016.
