= Francis Burgess =

Australian politician

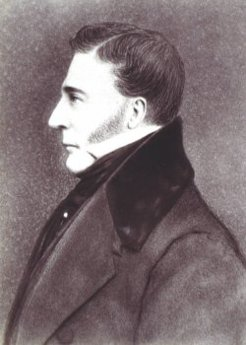
- Born: 1793; Leicester
- Died: 24 February 1864 (aged 70–71)
- Occupation: Barrister, police commissioner, magistrate, judge, politician
- Awards: Waterloo Medal
- Position held: Member of the Tasmanian Legislative Council (1843–1859)

Francis Burgess (1793–1864) was an English barrister, the first police commissioner for Birmingham, England, and subsequently chief police magistrate of Van Diemen's Land (from 1856 known as Tasmania), and served as a Member of the Van Diemen's Land Legislative Council.

== Early years ==
Burgess was born in 1793, the son of Bridget, (née Scott) and Francis Burgess of St. Martin's parish, Leicester.

He joined the 54th Regiment aged 18, as an ensign, serving in Holland in 1813, and at the Battle of Merxem, where he was wounded. He was then commissioned as a lieutenant. Just before the Battle of Waterloo, he was added to General George Johnstone's staff at Braine-le-Comte, and as a result received the Waterloo Medal. Placed on half-pay in 1817, he took up agriculture in Warwickshire, then trained in law, becoming a member of the Honourable Society of the Middle Temple, and being called to the bar in 1835.

== Career ==
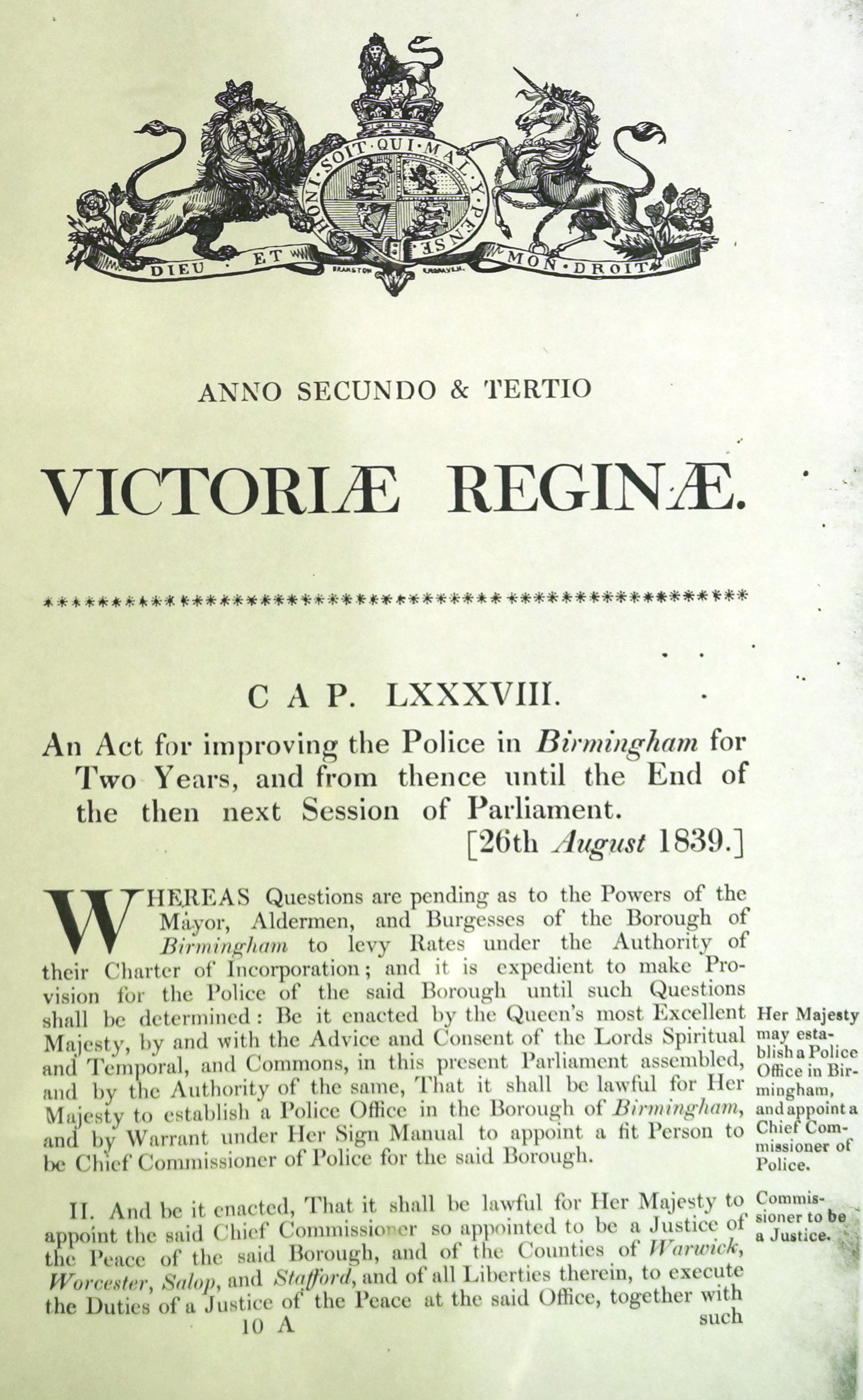
Birmingham Police Act, 1839

Burgess began work as a revising barrister in Northamptonshire. On 1 September 1839 he was appointed—under a special act of parliament, the Birmingham Police Act—as the first police commissioner for the (then) borough of Birmingham, reporting directly to the Government in London, at a salary of £900 a year. He developed innovate techniques for policing the borough; he introduced its first mounted patrols, and deployed plain-clothes officers at events where pickpockets were likely to operate.

On 12 August 1842 a new Police Act transferred responsibility for the police to Birmingham Town Council. Burgess was succeeded by Richard Stephens, as the first Superintendent of the Birmingham Borough Police.

Burgess was then appointed chief police magistrate of Van Diemen's Land, based at Hobart, on the recommendations of Sir Robert Peel and Sir James Graham; he succeed Captain Matthew Forster. The appointment was announced in the London Gazette on 19 May 1843. He sailed, with his wife and family, from Sheerness on the barque Asiatic, arriving in Hobart on 23 September. At the time, Tasmania had a large population of criminals, due to Transportation. Upon arrival he was appointed to the Van Diemen's Land Legislative Council, and was gazetted a member of the island's executive council in October 1843.

He was appointed a judge in the criminal court of Norfolk Island in June 1846, but by September had returned to Hobart due to ill health. The end of transportation resulted in a June 1854 proposal to abolish his position as police magistrate. This duly happened in August 1857, and he was awarded a pension of £170, whereas his salary had been £760. He also lost his automatic seat on the recently renamed Tasmanian Legislative Council, but was returned in October 1856 by election, representing the electoral division of Cambridge as an independent. In November 1857, he was offered a position as serjeant-at-arms, which he declined. He resigned his legislative council seat upon becoming a stipendiary magistrate at Richmond in 1859, retiring to his home nearby, Belmont, in March 1862.

== Personal life ==
Burgess was married to Amelia, née Husbands, in 1818. She and several of their six children accompanied him to Tasmania. They included:

- Ellen (1821–1908), an artist.
- Murray (1824?–1906) inspector of schools, secretary to the Council of Education, Shakespearean scholar, elocutionist and theatre critic
- Gordon Walter Haines (1833?–1876) surveyor of the Tasmanian Lake district

His oldest son Francis Jacques, a captain in the 74th Regiment of Bengal Native Infantry, was killed in the Indian Rebellion of 1857.

Burgess died at Belmont on 24 February 1864; his funeral took place in Hobart on 1 March. Two other daughters predeceased him. Amelia died on 14 September 1881.
