= Joseph Childs =

Commandant of Norfolk Island and royal marines officer (1787–1870)

Major Joseph Childs (1787–1870) was a British Royal Marines officer and penal administrator; he was commandant of the second convict settlement at Norfolk Island, from 7 February 1844 to August 1846.

== Early life and military career ==
Joseph Childs was born at Roche, Cornwall in 1787.

Childs was commissioned as a Second-Lieutenant in the Plymouth Division of the Royal Marines on 21 April 1809 and served aboard H.M.S. Gibraltar during the Napoleonic wars. During the War of 1812 against the United States Childs served with the 1st Battalion, Royal Marines commanded by Lieutenant Colonel Richard Williams. In 1813 he participated in landings on Craney Island and Kent Island during the Chesapeake Bay campaign.

Joseph Childs married Anne Trickey on 20 September 1819 at Stoke Damerel, Devon. The couple had several children.

Childs attained the ranks of Lieutenant in 1827, Adjutant in 1836 and Captain in 1837. He served in Syria in 1840.

== Commandant of Norfolk Island ==
In 1843 the Colonial Secretary in England, Lord Stanley, decided to replace Alexander Maconochie as Commandant of the penal settlement on Norfolk Island. It had been determined that Maconochie’s progressive methods of penal administration had proved to be unsuitable and what was required "was a course of even more severe discipline". Captain Joseph Childs of the Royal Marines, a man reputed to be a strict disciplinarian, was chosen by Stanley to fill the role. Childs was promoted to Brevet-Major and appointed Superintendent and Commandant of Norfolk Island. The new appointee had no experience of living in a penal colony and was soon to learn that "men trained only to the discipline of the gaol-yard were a totally different proposition from a corps of marines".

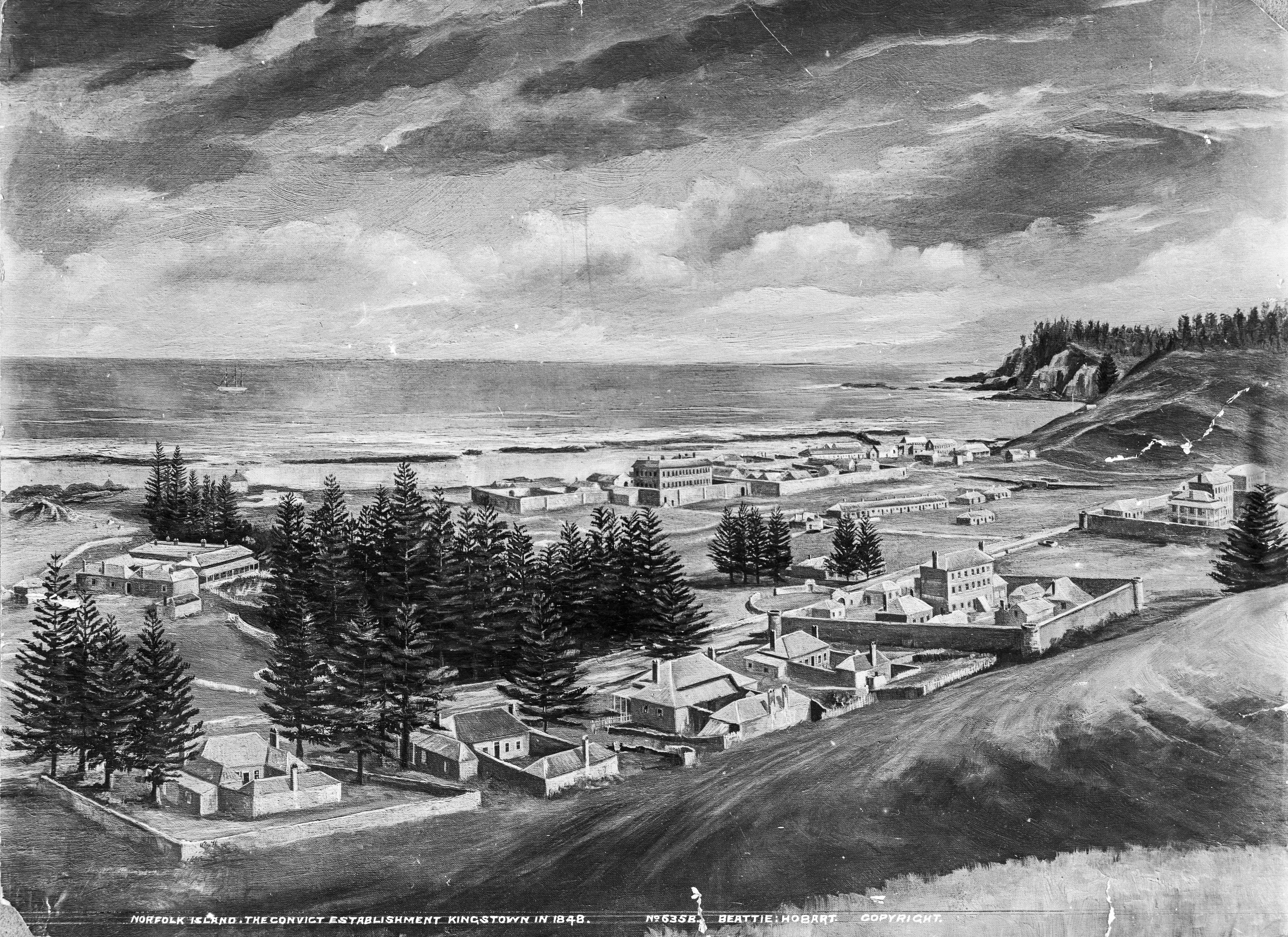
The Norfolk Island convict settlement in 1848.

Major Childs sailed from England aboard the Maitland, together with a detachment of the 58th Regiment and 195 prisoners being transported directly from England to Norfolk Island. The vessel docked at Sydney in January 1844 where Childs met with Governor Gipps and received his instructions. While Major Childs was in Sydney a newspaper editorial summarised what was expected of him under his new command: "That officer is called upon to enforce scrupulous order and minute discipline, to put down all overt outrages upon morals, and yet to temper military rigour with that amount of mercy which it may be possible to exercise". The Maitland arrived at Norfolk Island on 7 February 1844 where Childs was greeted by the man he was replacing. After the hand-over of duties Maconochie left for Hobart Town aboard the Maitland. The administrative responsibility for the penal settlement on Norfolk Island was then in the process of being transferred from New South Wales to the government of Van Diemen’s Land. The process was completed by September 1844, after which Childs reported to Sir John Eardley-Wilmot, Lieutenant-Governor of Van Diemen’s Land.

A comment in the Colonial Times newspaper of Hobart Town reveals the widespread belief that the administration of Joseph Childs would bring about a distinct change in the treatment of the convicts on Norfolk Island. On the news of the departure of a group of convicts to the island in late April 1844, the newspaper observed: "The colony has been relieved of a considerable number of the most incorrigible of the prisoners… where we learn the 'worst than death system' has re-commenced in all its glory". The convicts held on Norfolk Island at this time were made up of doubly-convicted colonial prisoners and those who had been sentenced to transportation for 15 years or life in the United Kingdom. Amongst the colonial prisoners (known as 'old hands') were many inveterate law-breakers who had engaged in activities such as bushranging, cattle-thieving, robberies, burglary and piracy. These were the 'flash-men' of the settlement who displayed extreme contempt for authority and scorned the punishments that were meted out. The elite amongst this set of hardened criminals was a group known as 'the Ring' who dominated the other prisoners and were contemptuous of the guards and overseers who supervised them day-to-day.

A visiting magistrate reported that while Childs was "a most amiable benevolent gentleman and honorable officer" what was needed to avoid anarchy and insubordination was "an officer of experience in, or capacity for, government, judgement, energy, decision and firmness".

In August 1845 Samuel Barrow arrived on Norfolk Island as a Stipendiary Magistrate. Barrow was a barrister of the Middle Temple in London, aged in his late twenties. In a letter to Lord Stanley one of the clergymen on the island, Rev. Beagley Naylor, described Barrow as "a bumptious brutal fellow whose arbitrary assertions of authority... caused great resentment among the free officials". Naylor also repeated the belief that discontent among the convicts could in large measure be ascribed to Barrow's "harsh punishments and brutal methods of his convict police".

In September 1845 it was reported that "things are in a very unsatisfactory state – in fact verging to mutiny" at the Norfolk Island penal settlement. The account concluded: "It is confidently asserted that Major Childs cannot be permitted to retain much longer his present appointment". By the end of 1845 "mutinous disturbances" were reportedly occurring on the island.

The rations for prisoners had "always been notoriously bad at Norfolk Island", essentially consisting of salt beef and maize meal. However, the men had for many years been allowed the indulgence of growing sweet potatoes on plots of land reserved for their use. On 1 January 1846 a public order was posted proclaiming that henceforth all the garden plots were to be taken away from the prisoners. The men refused to work unless there was extra rations to compensate for the loss of the sweet potatoes. Major Childs tried to placate them with promises of additional rations of peas and flour, though the loss of their garden beds remained a source of resentment for the prisoners.

On the morning of 1 July 1846 a serious outbreak occurred (later known as the ‘cooking pot riot’) after the prisoners' cooking vessels were confiscated during the previous evening, in an effort to more closely control the distribution of rations. A group of prisoners, resentful of the action, broke into the store-room and retrieved the articles. A core group of agitated convicts, about sixty in number, then sought out those they held responsible, resulting in a riot and the murders of three convict-constables and an overseer. The mutiny was quickly suppressed by force of arms and the rioters put in chains.

Within ten days of the insurrection the brig Governor Phillip arrived at Norfolk Island from Van Diemen’s Land, having departed before news of the mutinous outbreak reached the colony. Amongst the official despatches was one informing Major Childs that his replacement, John Price, formerly Police Magistrate at Hobart Town, was to shortly arrive at the island. The Lady Franklin sailed from Hobart Town with John Price and his family on board, departing before the Governor Phillip arrived back with the news from Norfolk Island. Major Childs departed from Norfolk Island on 19 August 1846 aboard the Government schooner Marys, arriving in Sydney twelve days later. He left Sydney for London on 14 January 1847 aboard the Trafalgar.

Thirteen convicts were convicted of murder and aiding and abetting murder and hanged by Childs' successor, John Price, who considered Childs responsible for the state of affairs that led to the revolt. A Scottish journal article at the time blamed the situation on Childs' "utter imbecility".

On 5 May 1847 in the House of Commons in England, Joseph Hume successfully moved "an Address for copies of the official report of the outbreak at Norfolk Island in July 1846, and of proceedings thereon; Criminal Returns of Norfolk Island from February 1844, when the late Superintendent Major Childs assumed the command".

== Later life ==
After returning to England Joseph Childs continued to serve in the Royal Marines. At the time of the 1851 Census Joseph Childs and his wife Anne were living in the parish of Stoke Damerel, Devonport in county Devonshire. He was promoted to Lieutenant-Colonel in 1852. In July 1855 Childs was promoted to Colonel-Commandant of the Plymouth Division.

On 31 March 1857 Joseph Childs retired with the honorary rank of Major-General. At the 1861 Census he was living in Launceston, Cornwall, recorded as a widower and a lodger in the household of Sarah Smith, aged 75 years. At the time of his death Childs was recorded as a Major-General of the Royal Marines Light Infantry "on the Retired List". Joseph Childs died on 2 January 1870 at Liskeard, Cornwall, aged 83 years.
