= List of convicts transported to Australia =

Penal transportation to Australia began with the arrival of the First Fleet in 1788 and ended in 1868. Overall, approximately 165,000 convicts were transported to Australia.

== Convicts ==
=== A ===
- Esther Abrahams (c. 1767–1846), English wife of George Johnston, transported to New South Wales in 1788 for theft

=== B ===
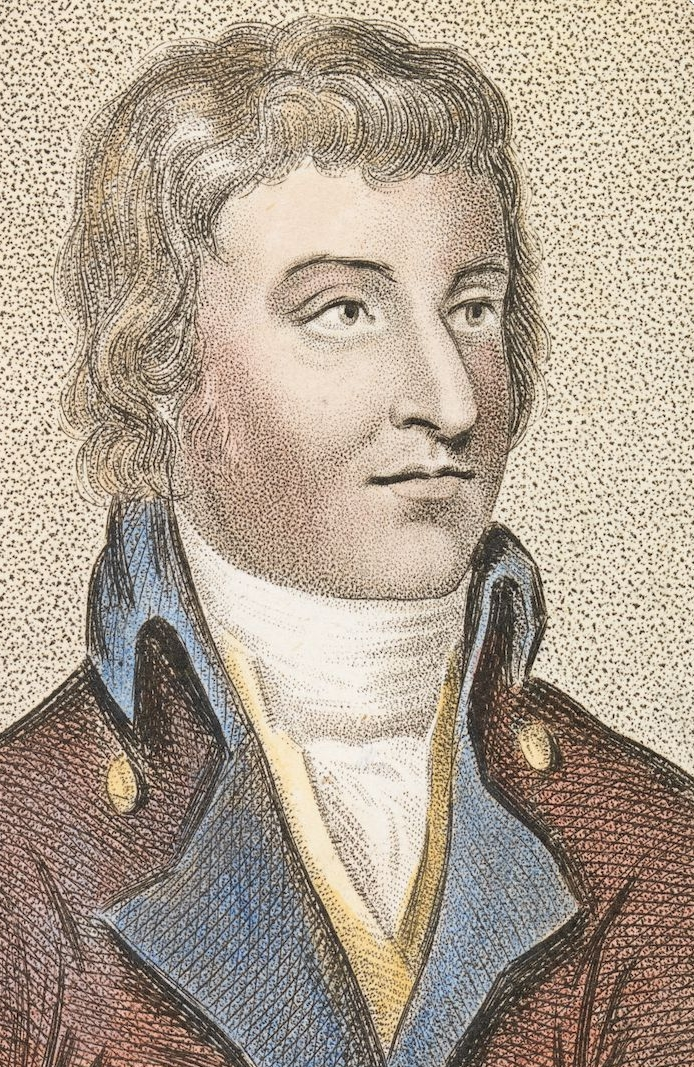
George Barrington

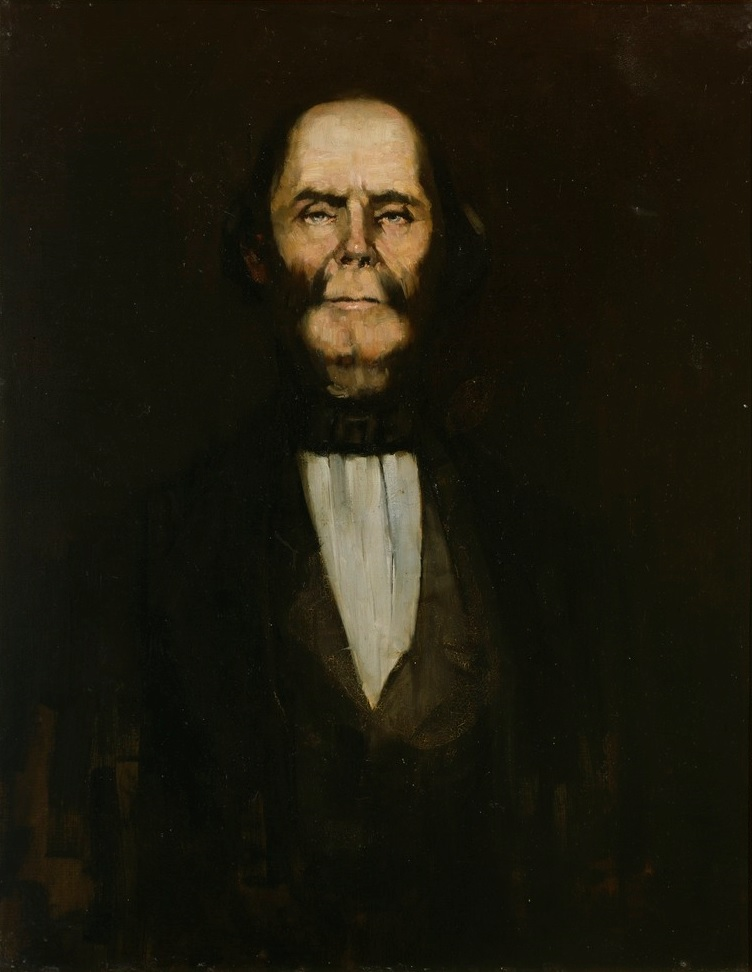
William Buckley

- Joseph Backler (1813–1895), English artist, transported to New South Wales in 1832 for forgery
- William Bannon (1826–1904), Irish soldier, transported to Van Diemen's Land in 1849 for theft
- George Barrington (1755–1804), Irish author and socialite, transported to New South Wales in 1788 for pickpocketing
- Thomas Barrett (c. 1754–1788), English artist, transported to New South Wales in 1788 for mutiny
- John Baughan (1754–1797), English carpenter, transported to New South Wales in 1788 for theft
- Sarah Bellamy (1770–1843), English maid, servant and weaver, transported to New South Wales for theft
- Andrew Bent (1790–1851), English printer and publisher, transported to New South Wales for burglary
- James Blackburn (1803–1854), English architect and engineer, transported to Van Diemen's Land for forgery
- William Bland (1789–1868), English politician and inventor, transported to Van Diemen's Land for manslaughter
- Solomon Blay (1816–1897), English hangman, transported to Van Diemen's Land for forgery
- James Bloodsworth (1759–1804), English builder, transported to New South Wales for theft
- Billy Blue (c. 1767–1834), Jamaican boatman, transported to New South Wales for theft
- Thomas Bock (1790–1855), English artist, transported to Van Diemen's Land for administering drugs to a young woman
- Ruth Bowyer (c. 1761–1788), English First Fleeter, transported to New South Wales for theft
- Matthew Brady (1799–1826), English bushranger, transported to Van Diemen's Land for theft
- Richard Browne (1776–1824), Irish artist, transported to New South Wales for forgery
- Mary Bryant (1765–?), Cornish escapee, transported to New South Wales for highway robbery
- William Bryant (c. 1757–1791), Cornish escapee, transported to New South Wales for impersonating a Royal Navy seaman
- William Buckley (1780–1856), English escapee, transported to New South Wales for possessing a roll of stolen cloth
- Knud Bull (1811–1889), Norwegian artist, transported to Van Diemen's Land for forgery
- Richard Burgess (1829–1866), English bushranger, transported to New South Wales for highway robbery
- Robert Francis Burns (1840–1883), Irish murderer, transported to Western Australia for theft

=== C ===
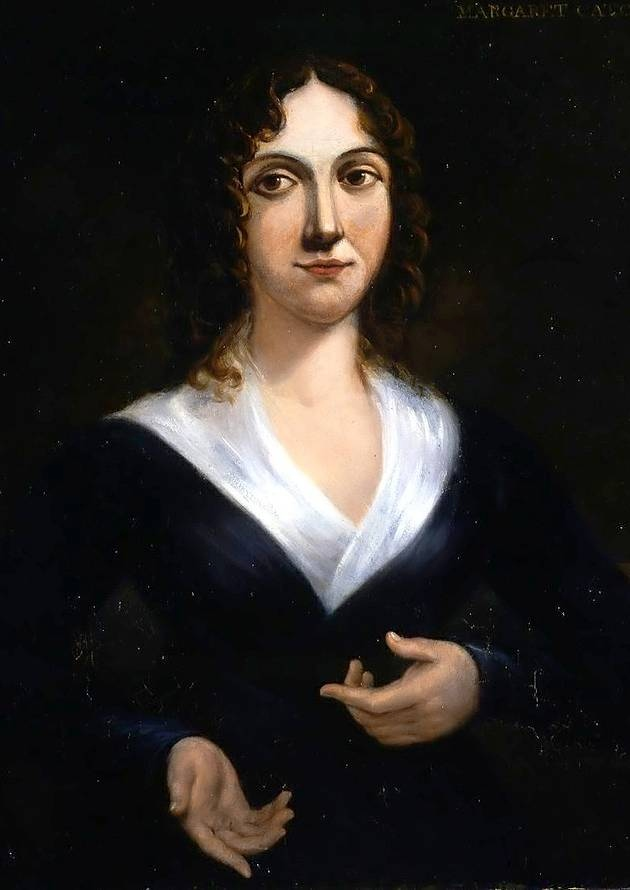
Margaret Catchpole

- John Cadman (1772–1848), English publican, transported to New South Wales for horse theft
- John Caesar (c. 1763–1796), Madagascan or West Indian bushranger, transported to New South Wales for theft
- Elizabeth Callaghan (1802–1852), Irish wife of explorer John Batman, transported to New South Wales for forgery
- John Casey (?–1882), Irish rebel, transported to New South Wales for insurrection
- Martin Cash (1808–1877), Irish bushranger, transported to New South Wales for shooting at a man
- Denis Cashman (1842–1897), Irish Fenian, transported to Western Australia for treason
- Margaret Catchpole (1762–1819), English adventuress and chronicler, transported to New South Wales for horse theft
- Alfred Chopin (1846–1902), English photographer, transported to Western Australia for receiving stolen goods
- William Clackson (c. 1799–?), Scottish shoemaker and activist, transported to New South Wales for his role in the Radical War
- Daniel Connor (1831–1898), Irish businessman and politician, transported to Western Australia in 1853 for sheep stealing
- Daniel Cooper (1785–1853), English businessman, transported to New South Wales for theft
- William Cuffay (1788–1870), English Chartist leader, transported to Van Diemen's Land for sedition and "levying war" against Queen Victoria

=== D ===
- David Davies (1812–1874), Welsh poet and rebel, transported to Van Diemen's Land for his role in the Rebecca Riots
- John Davies (1813–1872), English journalist and newspaper proprietor, transported to Van Diemen's Land in 1830 for receiving stolen goods
- Edward Davis (1816–1841), Jewish bushranger, transported to New South Wales for theft
- James Davis (1807–1889), Scottish escapee, transported to New South Wales for theft
- Ann Dinham (1827–1882), English innkeeper, transported to Van Diemen's Land for theft
- James Dixon (1758–1840), Irish priest, transported to New South Wales in 1800 for his role in the Irish Rebellion of 1798
- Jack Donahue (1804–1830), Irish bushranger, transported to New South Wales for intent to commit a felony
- Aimable Duperouzel (1831–1901), French farmer, transported to Western Australia for robbery

=== E ===
- Edward Eagar (1787–1866), Irish lawyer and merchant, transported to New South Wales for forgery
- Edmund Edgar (1804–1854), English artist, transported to New South Wales in 1826 for theft
- Ralph Entwistle (c. 1805–1830), English bushranger and leader of the Bathurst rebellion, transported to New South Wales for theft
- John Eyre (1771–?), English artist, transported to New South Wales for housebreaking

=== F ===
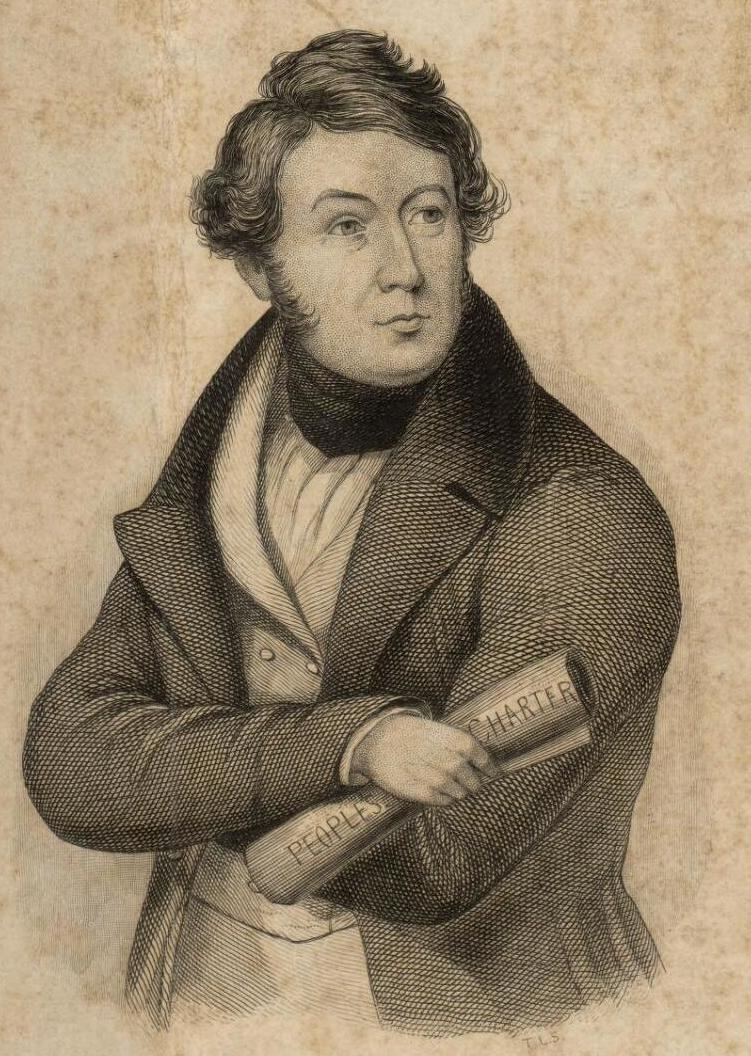
John Frost

- Gilburri (1814–1902), Irish Fenian, transported to New South Wales in 1838 for desertion
- Thomas McCarthy Fennell (1841–1914), Irish Fenian, transported to Western Australia in 1868 for treason
- William Field (1774–1837), English businessman, transported to New for receiving stolen goods
- John Frost (1784–1877), Welsh Chartist, transported to Van Diemen's Land for his role in the Newport Rising
- Henry Fulton (1761–1840), Irish clergyman and schoolmaster, transported to New South Wales for his role in the Irish Rebellion of 1798

=== G ===
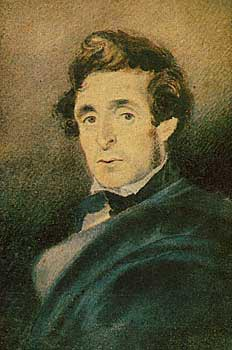
William Buelow Gould

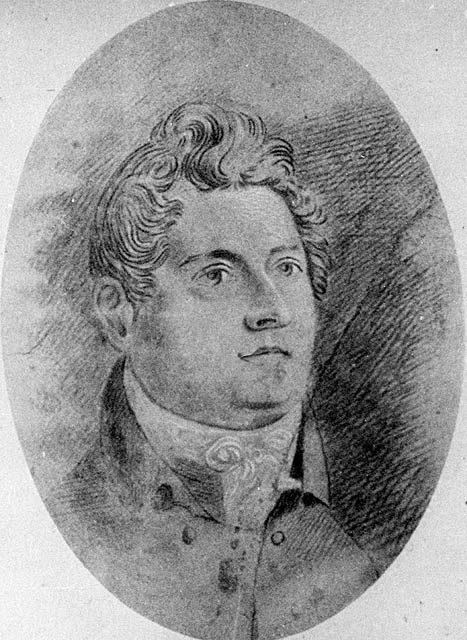
Francis Greenway

- Henry Beresford Garrett (c. 1818–1885), English bushranger, transported to Norfolk Island for assault
- Joseph Gerrald (1763–1796), West Indian-born political reformer, transported to New South Wales for sedition
- James Goodwin (c. 1800–c. 1835), English escapee and explorer, transported to Van Diemen's Land for theft
- John Guard (c. 1791–1857), English whaler, transported to New South Wales for theft
- William Buelow Gould (1801–1853), English artist, transported to Van Diemen's Land for theft
- Francis Greenway (1777–1837), English architect, transported to New South Wales for forgery
- William Henry Groom (1833–1901), English politician, transported to New South Wales for embezzlement

=== H ===
- Laurence Hynes Halloran (1765–1831), Irish poet and schoolmaster, transported to New South Wales for forgery
- Dorothy Handland (1706–?), English rag dealer, transported to New South Wales for perjury
- Henry Browne Hayes (1762–1832), Irish knight and adventurer, transported to New South Wales for kidnapping
- Daniel Herbert (1802–1868), English artist and stonemason, transported to Van Diemen's Land for highway robbery
- Joseph Holt (1756–1826), Irish farmer and rebel leader, transported to New South Wales for his role in the Irish Rebellion of 1798
- William Horton (1817–1864), English publican, transported to New South Wales for larceny of a coat
- George Howe (1769–1821), English poet and printer, transported to New South Wales for shoplifting
- Michael Howe (1787–1818), English bushranger, transported to Van Diemen's Land for highway robbery
- Ralph Hush (1779–1860), English farmer, transported to New South Wales for theft
- William Hutchinson (1772–1846), English businessman, transported to New South Wales for theft
- Mary Hyde (1779–1864), English businesswoman, transported to New South Wales for theft

=== J ===
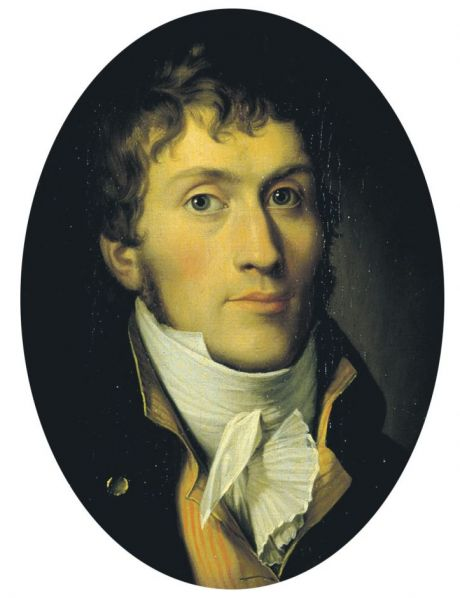
Jørgen Jørgensen

- Mark Jeffrey (1825–1903), English criminal, transported to New South Wales for burglary
- Joseph Bolitho Johns (c. 1826–1900), English bushranger, also known as Moondyne Joe, transported to Western Australia for theft
- George Jones (c. 1815–1844), English bushranger, transported to Van Diemen's Land for theft
- William Jones (1809–1873), Welsh Chartist, transported to Van Diemen's Land for his role in the Newport Rising
- Jørgen Jørgensen (1780–1841), Danish adventurer, transported to Van Diemen's Land for theft

=== K ===
- Henry Kable (1763–1846), English businessman, transported to New South Wales for theft
- Lawrence Kavenagh (c. 1805–1846), Irish bushranger, transported to Van Diemen's Land for burglary
- John Knatchbull (c. 1791–1844), English naval captain, transported to New South Wales for theft

=== L ===
- Solomon Levey (1794–1833), English merchant, transported to New South Wales for theft
- Simeon Lord (1771–1840), English businessman, transported to New South Wales for theft
- George Loveless (1797–1874), English labourer, transported to New South Wales as one of the Tolpuddle Martyrs
- Nathaniel Lucas (1764–1818), English carpenter, transported to New South Wales for theft
- Joseph Lycett (1774–c. 1825), English artist, transported to New South Wales for forgery
- John Lynch (1813–1842), Irish serial killer, transported to New South Wales for false pretense
- Samuel Lyons (1791–1851), English businessman, transported to New South Wales for theft

=== M ===
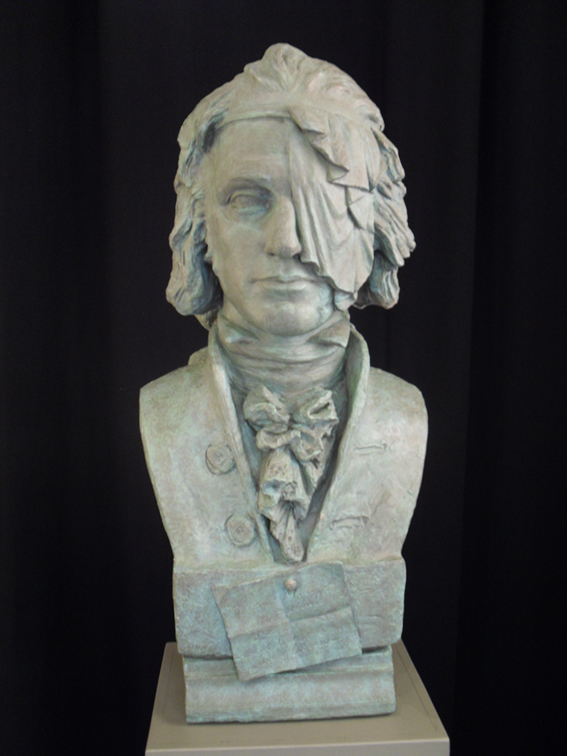
Thomas Muir

- Francis MacNamara c. 1810–1861), Irish poet, also known as Frank the Poet, transported to Van Diemen's Land for larceny
- John Martin (1812–1875), Irish nationalist, transported to Van Diemen's Land for sedition
- Terence MacManus (1811–1861), Irish nationalist, transported to Van Diemen's Land for treason
- Maurice Margarot (1745–1815), English political reformer, transported to New South Wales for sedition
- Valentine Marshall (1814–1874), English farmer, transported to Van Diemen's Land for his role in the Reform Act Riots
- Thomas Francis Meagher (1823–1867), Irish nationalist, transported to Van Diemen's Land for treason
- George Mealmaker (1768–1808), Scottish political reformer, transported to New South Wales for sedition
- James Meehan (1774–1826), Irish surveyor, transported to New South Wales in 1800 for his role in the Irish Rebellion of 1798
- John Mitchel (1815–1875), Irish nationalist and author, transported to Van Diemen's Land for treason
- Enoch Moore (1779–1841), Canadian rebel, transported to Van Diemen's Land for his role in the Rebellions of 1837
- Molly Morgan (1762–1835), English landowner, transported to New South Wales for theft and arson
- Thomas Muir (1765–1799), Scottish political reformer and escapee, transported to New South Wales for sedition

=== N ===
- Isaac Nichols (1770–1819), English businessman and postman, transported to New South Wales for theft

=== O ===
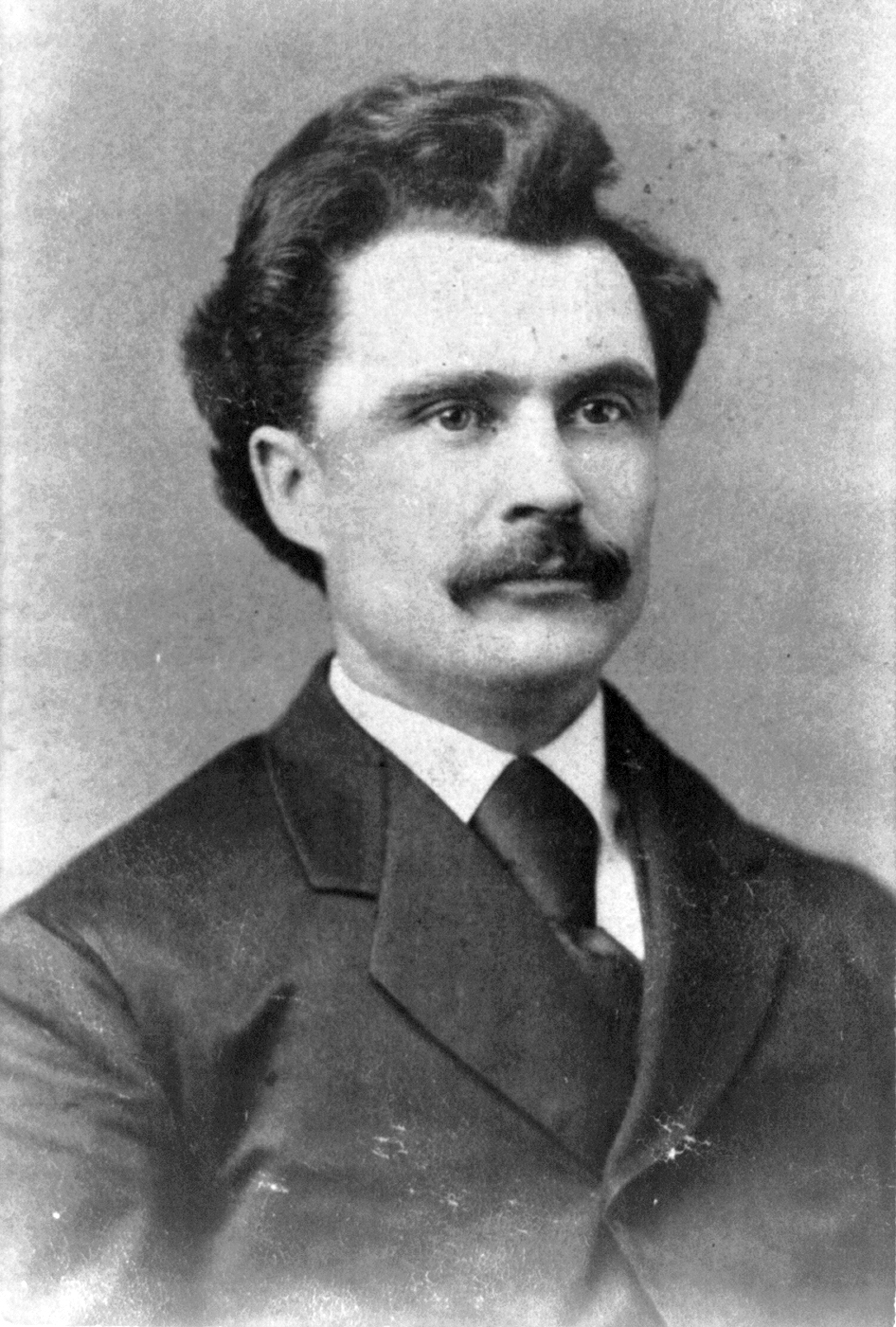
John Boyle O'Reilly

- William Smith O'Brien (1803–1864), Irish nationalist, transported to Van Diemen's Land for treason
- Kevin Izod O'Doherty (1823–1905), Irish nationalist, transported to Van Diemen's Land for treason
- Patrick O'Donoghue (–1854), Irish nationalist, transported to Van Diemen's Land for treason
- Cornelius O'Mahony (1840–1879), Irish scholar and Fenian, transported to Western Australia in 1868 for his role in the Fenian Rising
- John Boyle O'Reilly (1844–1890), Irish Fenian, poet and author, transported to Western Australia for his role in the Fenian Rising
- James Oatley (c. 1769–1839), English watchmaker, transported to New South Wales for theft

=== P ===
- Thomas Fyshe Palmer (1747–1802), English political reformer, transported to New South Wales for sedition
- Thomas Pamphlett (c. 1788–1838), English castaway, transported to New South Wales for theft
- Robert Pate (1819–1895), English army officer, transported to Van Diemen's Land for attacking Queen Victoria
- Alexander Pearce (1790–1824), Irish escapee and cannibal, transported to Van Diemen's Land for theft
- Joseph Potaski (1764–1824), Polish soldier, transported to Van Diemen's Land for theft
- Elizabeth Pulley (1762–1837), English servant, transported to New South Wales in 1788 for burglary

=== R ===
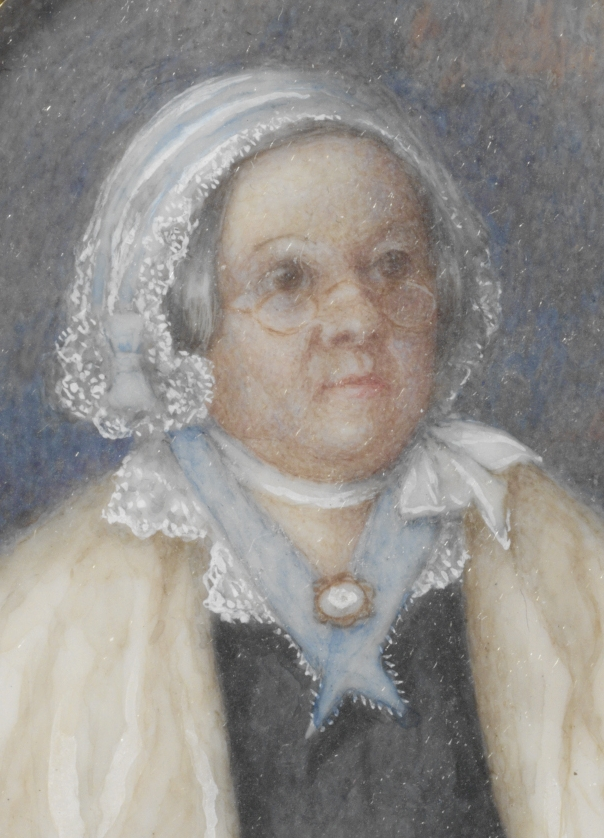
Mary Reibey

- Elizabeth Read (c. 1820–1884), English prostitute, transported to Van Diemen's Land in 1841 for theft
- Richard Read Sr. (c. 1765–c. 1829), English artist, transported to New South Wales for possessing forged banknotes
- William Redfern (1774–1833), English surgeon, transported to New South Wales for mutiny
- Leopold Redpath (1816–1891), English clerk, transported to Western Australia for fraud
- Mary Reibey (1777–1855), English businesswoman, transported to New South Wales in 1792 for horse theft
- John Richardson (c. 1797–1882), English explorer and botanist, transported to New South Wales for larceny
- Hannah Rigby (c. 1794–1853), English embroiderer, transported multiple times for theft
- Michael Massey Robinson (1744–1826), English poet, transported to New South Wales for extortion
- Charles Rodius (1802–1860), German artist, transported to New South Wales for theft
- Anthony Rope (1756–1843), Norfolk farmer, transported on First Fleet to New South Wales for theft
- James Ruse (c. 1759–1837), Cornish farmer, transported to New South Wales for housebreaking

=== S ===
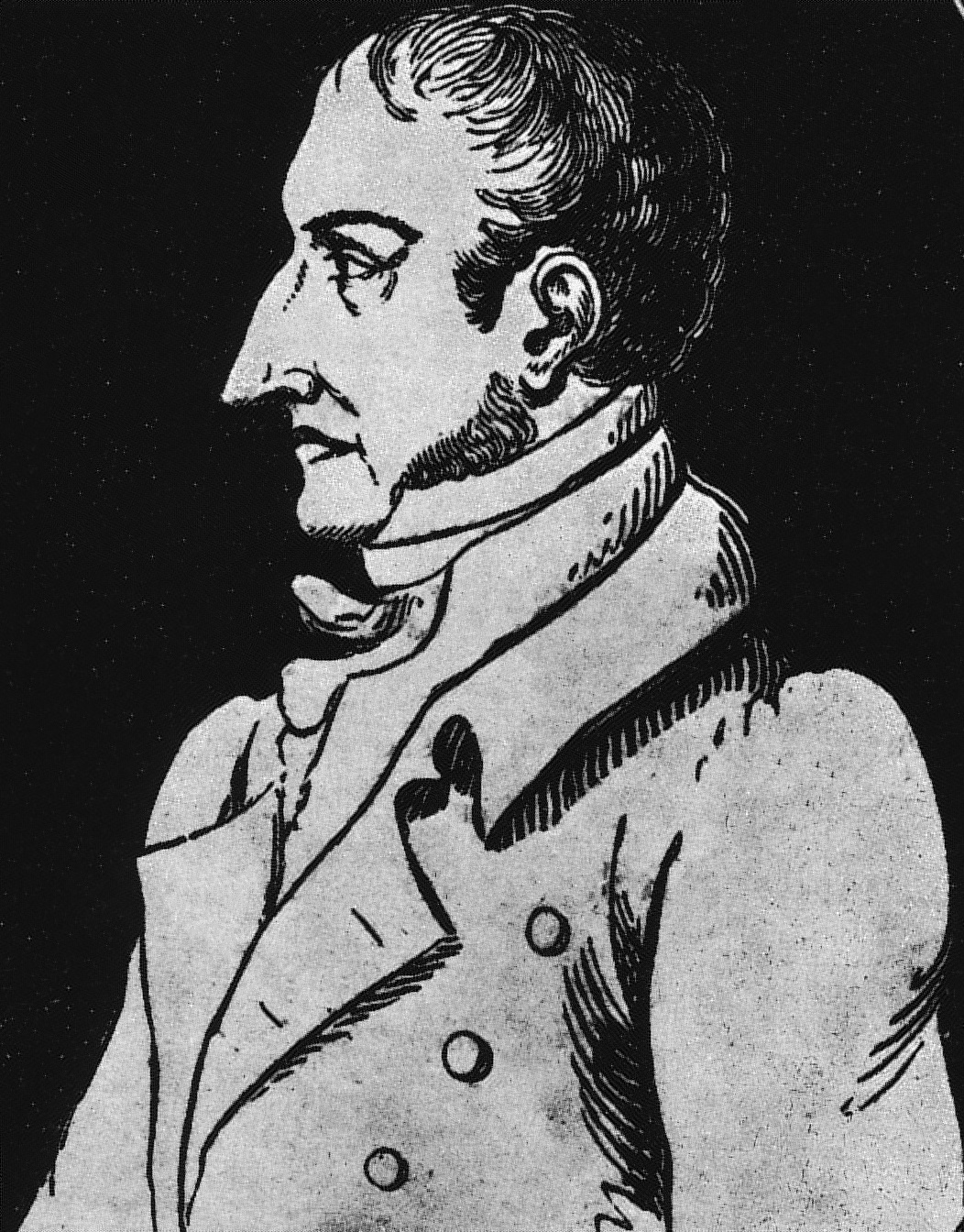
Ikey Solomon

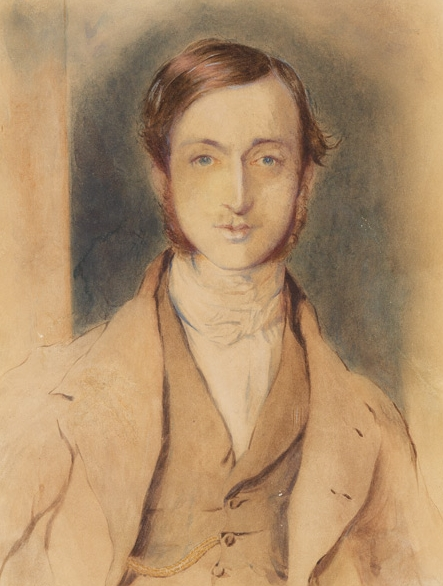
Thomas Griffiths Wainewright

- Joseph Samuel (c. 1780–1806), English escapee, transported to Van Diemen's Land for robbery
- Henry Savery (1791–1842), English novelist, transported to Van Diemen's Land for forgery
- Shoni Sguborfawr (1811–1858), Welsh rebel, transported to Norfolk Island for his role in the Rebecca Riots
- Robert Sidaway (1758–1809), English philanthropist, transported to New South Wales for theft
- William Skirving (c. 1745–1796), Scottish political reformer, transported to New South Wales for sedition
- Emanuel Solomon (1800–1873), English businessman and politician, transported to New South Wales for larceny
- Ikey Solomon (c. 1787–1850), English criminal, transported to Van Diemen's Land for receiving stolen goods
- Vaiben Solomon (1798–1860), English businessman and politician, transported to New South Wales for larceny
- James Squire (1754–1822), English brewer, transported to New South Wales for highway robbery
- Elizabeth Steel (c. 1760–1795), English deaf person, transported to New South Wales for theft
- Owen Suffolk (1829–?), English poet and bushranger, transported to New South Wales for forgery

=== T ===
- John Tawell (1784–1845), English chemist and murderer, transported to New South Wales for forgery
- Hohepa Te Umuroa (c. 1820s–1847), Maori warrior, transported to Van Diemen's Land for his role in the New Zealand Wars
- Samuel Terry (c. 1776–1838), English philanthropist, transported to New South Wales for theft
- Andrew Thompson (c. 1773–1810), Scottish farmer, magistrate, transported to New South Wales for theft
- William Tucker (c. 1784–1817), English sealer, transported to New South Wales for theft

=== U ===
- James Underwood (1771–1844) English shipbuilder, distiller and merchant, transported to New South Wales in 1790

=== V ===
- James Hardy Vaux (1782–?), English author and serial thief, transported to New South Wales on three separate occasions

=== W ===
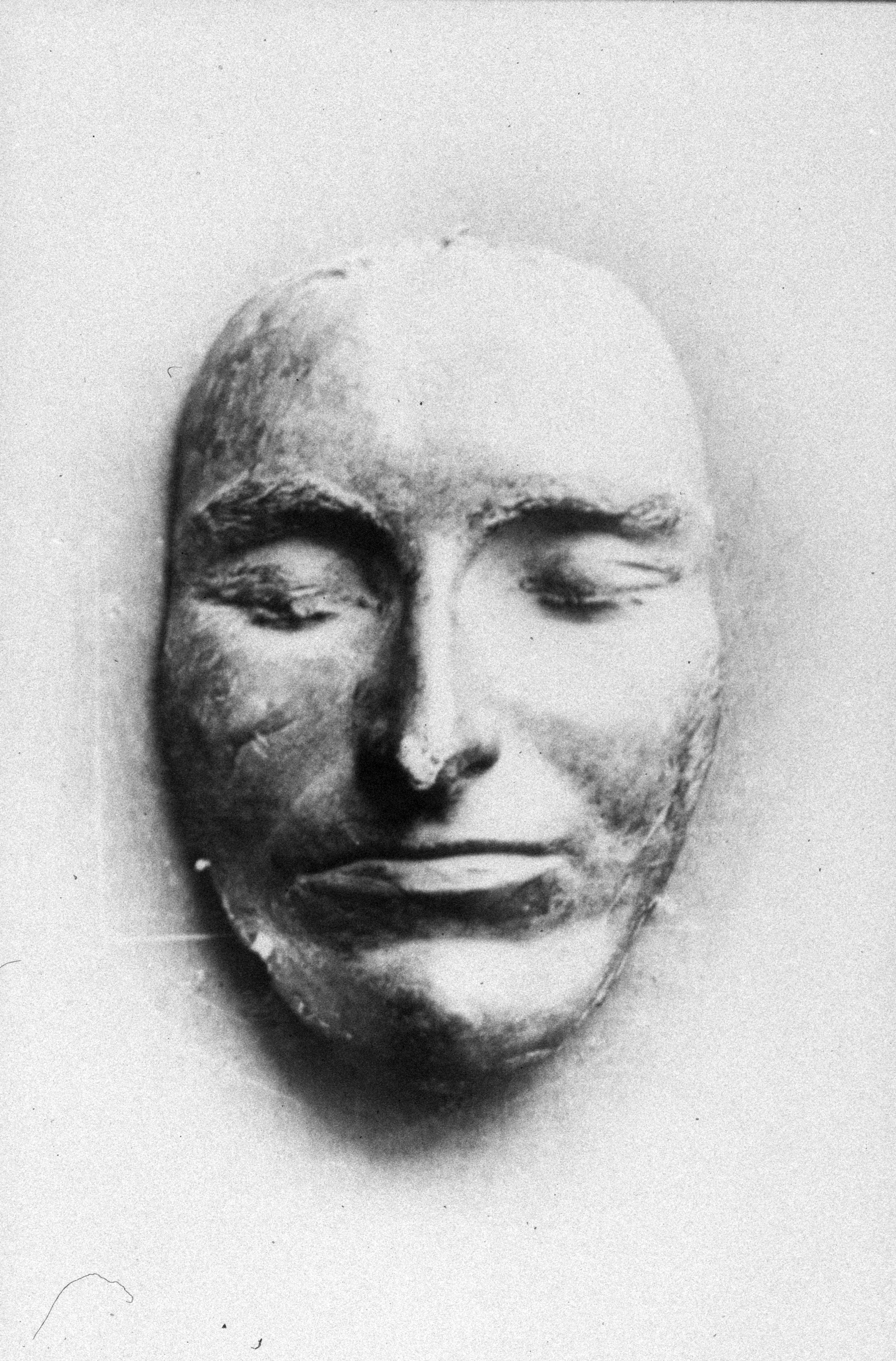
William Westwood

- Thomas Griffiths Wainewright (1794–1847), English artist, journalist and alleged serial killer, transported to Van Diemen's Land for forgery
- James Walsh ( 1833–1871), English artist, transported to Western Australia for theft and forgery
- Thomas Watling (1762–c. 1814), Scottish artist, transported to New South Wales for forgery
- William Westwood (c. 1830–1846), English bushranger and leader of the Cooking Pot Uprising, transported to New South Wales for stealing a coat
- Joseph Wild (c. 1759–1847), English explorer, transported to New South Wales for burglary
- Henry Wildman (1838–?), English explorer, transported to Western Australia for burglary
- Frances Williams (c. 1760–1801), Welsh woman, transported to New South Wales then Norfolk Island for burglary
- John Williams (c. 1820–?), English boatman, transported to Van Diemen's Land in 1852 for theft
- Zephaniah Williams (1795–1874), Welsh Chartist, transported to Van Diemen's Land for his role in the Newport Rising
- James Wilson (1836–1921), Irish Fenian, transported to Western Australia for desertion and mutiny
- Solomon Wiseman (1777–1838), English merchant and ferryman, transported to New South Wales for theft

== See also ==
- List of convicts on the First Fleet
