= Charles Rodius =

German-born artist and architect (1802–1860)

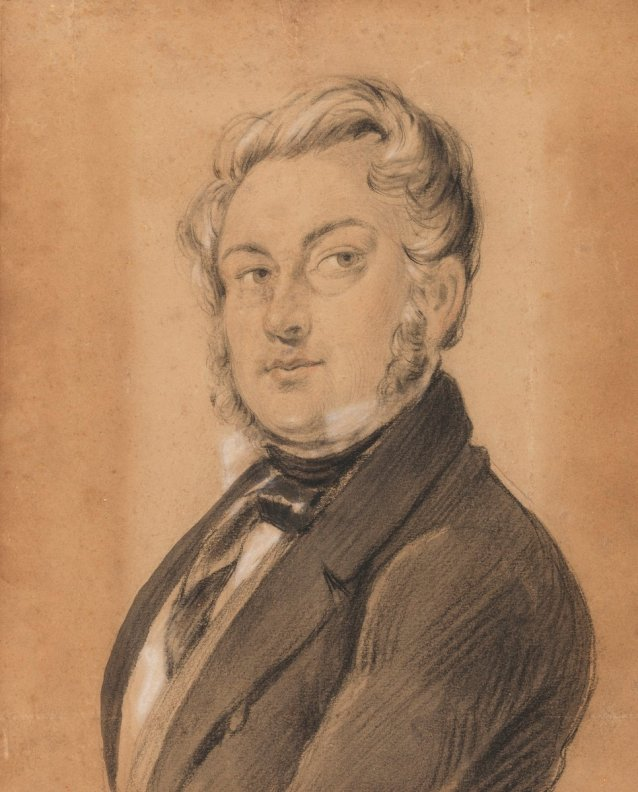
- Self-portrait, c. 1849
- Born: Joseph Meyer; 1802; Cologne, Germany
- Died: 9 April 1860 (aged 57–58); Sydney, New South Wales, Australia

Charles Rodius (born Joseph Meyer, 1802 – 9 April 1860) was a German-born artist, printmaker and architect. Trained in France before moving to England, he was transported as a convict to the Australian penal colony of New South Wales for theft in 1829.

While not as well known as other convict artists, such as Joseph Lycett and Thomas Griffiths Wainewright, Rodius has received praise for his works, and he is represented in several major Australian galleries.

== Early life and education ==
Rodius was born in 1802 in Cologne, Germany; other sources give Hamburg as his place of birth as part of the large Jewish population of that city. As a teenager he moved to Paris, France, where he studied art and worked as a teacher of "music, painting, drawing and languages in families of the first distinction".

He move to London in 1927 where he changed his name to Charles Rodius. There he was charged in early 1829 with stealing a perfume bottle, tickets, an opera glass and a handkerchief from a woman's purse. Rodius defended himself, arguing that the items were gifts from some of his female students. He was nonetheless convicted and sentenced to seven years' transportation to the Australian penal colony of New South Wales. At the time of his trial, he was described as "a young foreigner, dressed in a most fashionable style".

== Transportation to Australia ==
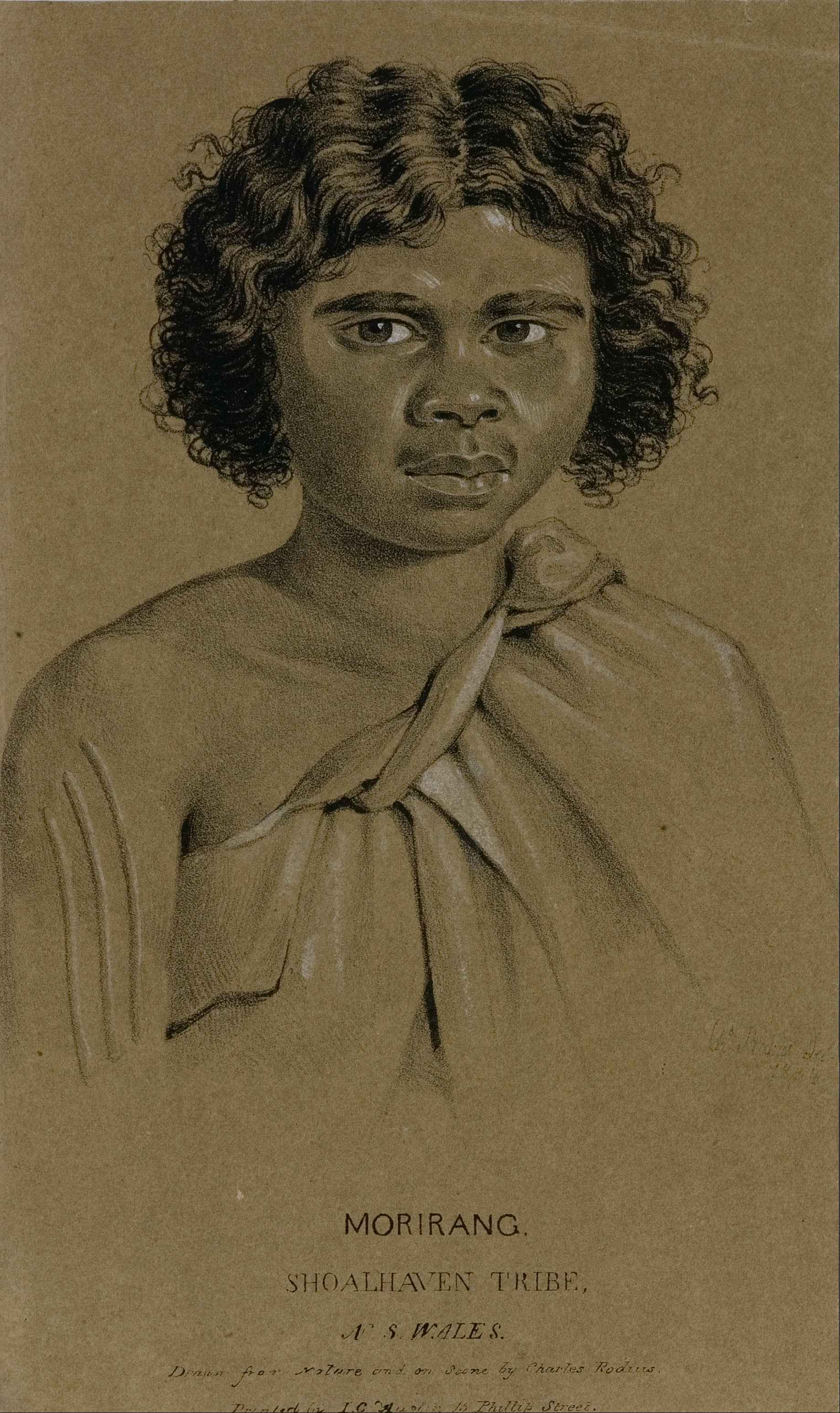
Morirang, Shoalhaven Tribe, New South Wales, 1834, Art Gallery of South Australia

Rodius arrived in New South Wales aboard the convict ship Sarah in December 1829. Like Thomas Bock, Joseph Lycett, and other transported convicts with artistic abilities, Rodius's skills as a draughtsman were utilised by the colonial authorities and he was assigned to the Department of Public Works in Sydney. He taught drawing to civil and military officers and helped to devise plans for proposed colonial buildings. Rodius was also commissioned as a portraitist by members of the colony's elite, such as Chief Justice Francis Forbes and merchant Alexander Brodie Spark. Having established himself as an artist with the reputation of a dandy, Rodius, with the support of his patronage, was granted a ticket of exemption in 1832—the year he began to earn his own living as an artist—which was changed to a ticket of leave two years later.

== Work as an Artist ==
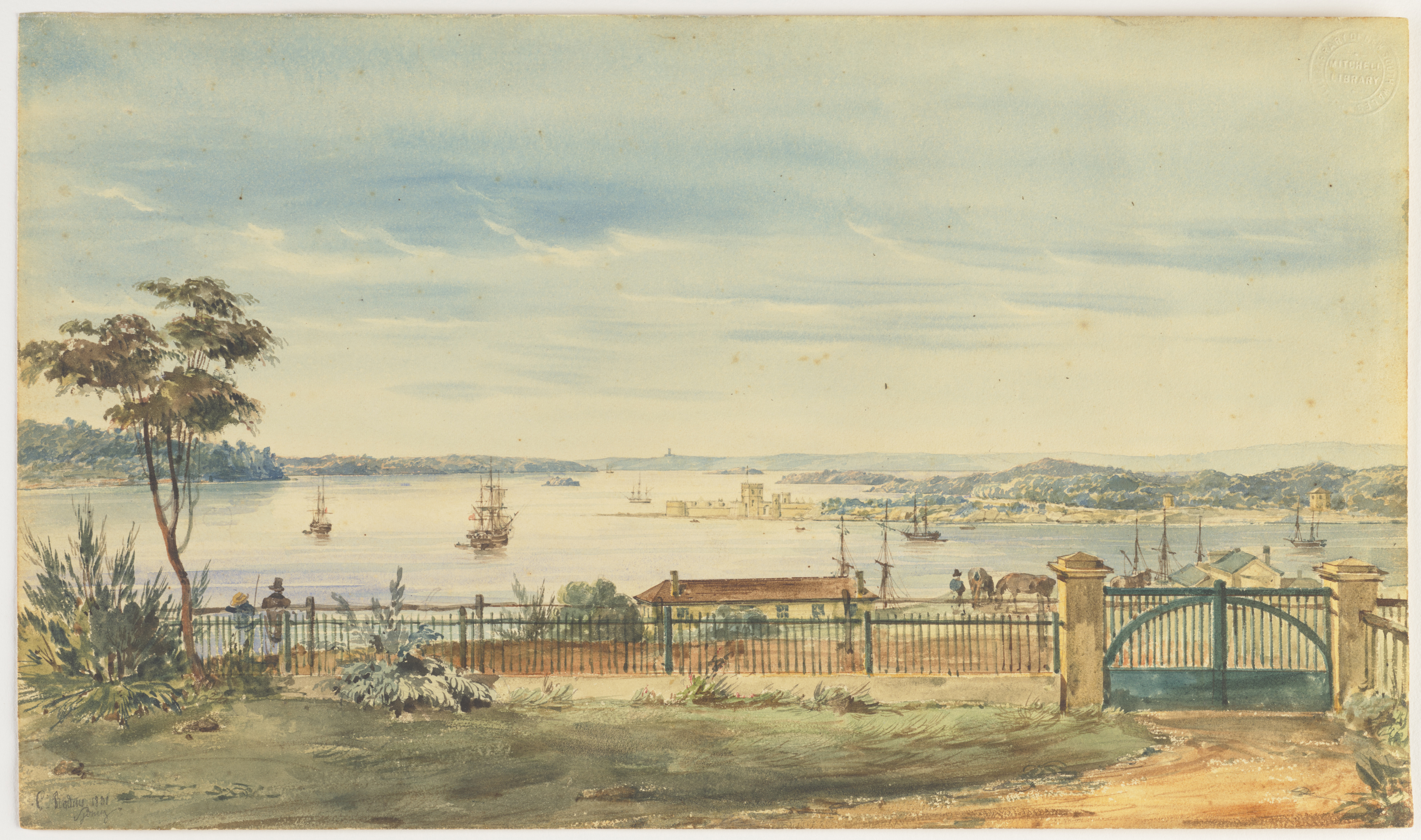
View of Sydney harbour, 1831

Rodius remained in Australia where he continued to create portraits of well-known colonial identities, including explorer and fellow German Ludwig Leichhardt. According to National Portrait Gallery curator Joanna Gilmour, it was Rodius's portraits of Indigenous Australians that "demonstrated his true dexterity" as an artist. While, in Gilmour's opinion, some of the images hint at caricature, others, such as his images of Aborigines from the Shoalhaven district, "are disarming in their softness and sensitivity". Art critic Christopher Allen calls Rodius's Aboriginal portraits, which include Bungaree and his wife, Cora Gooseberry, honest, lucid, and respectful, not a caricature in any way. These works were widely disseminated by the artist as lithographs, sold at a price intended to "place these interesting copies within the reach of all classes".

Rodius suffered a stroke in the late 1850s, leaving him paralysed on one side, and on 9 April 1860 he died "of infirmity" at Sydney's Liverpool Hospital.

His first wife was Maria Bryan, seamstress, and they had a son, Charles Prosser, born 27 August 1834. His second wife was named Harriet and they are supposed to have married 14 December 1838. She died just 4 days later. His third wife was Elizabeth Harriet Allen and they married 1 April 1841. He was survived by his third wife who remarried in 1863.

His works were shown in a group exhibition at the National Portrait Gallery, Canberra, and the Tasmanian Museum and Art Gallery, Hobart, in 2012 The State Library of New South Wales held the first ever retrospective of his works in 2023–2024.

== See also ==
- List of convicts transported to Australia
- Australian art
