= Corroboree (disambiguation) =

A corroboree is a generic word for a meeting of Australian Aboriginal peoples.

Corroboree may also refer to:

- Corroboree (ballet), a ballet written in the 1940s
- Waiata (album), a 1981 Split Enz album entitled Corroboree in Australia

== See also ==
- Corroboree 1949, a show of Aboriginal culture mounted by Bill Onus
- Corroboree 2000, a two-day reconciliation event at the Sydney Opera House held in May 2000
- Corroboree at Newcastle (c. 1818), a painting attributed to convict artist Joseph Lycett
- Corroboree Park, Canberra, ACT
- Corroboree Rock Conservation Reserve, protected area in the Northern Territory of Australia
