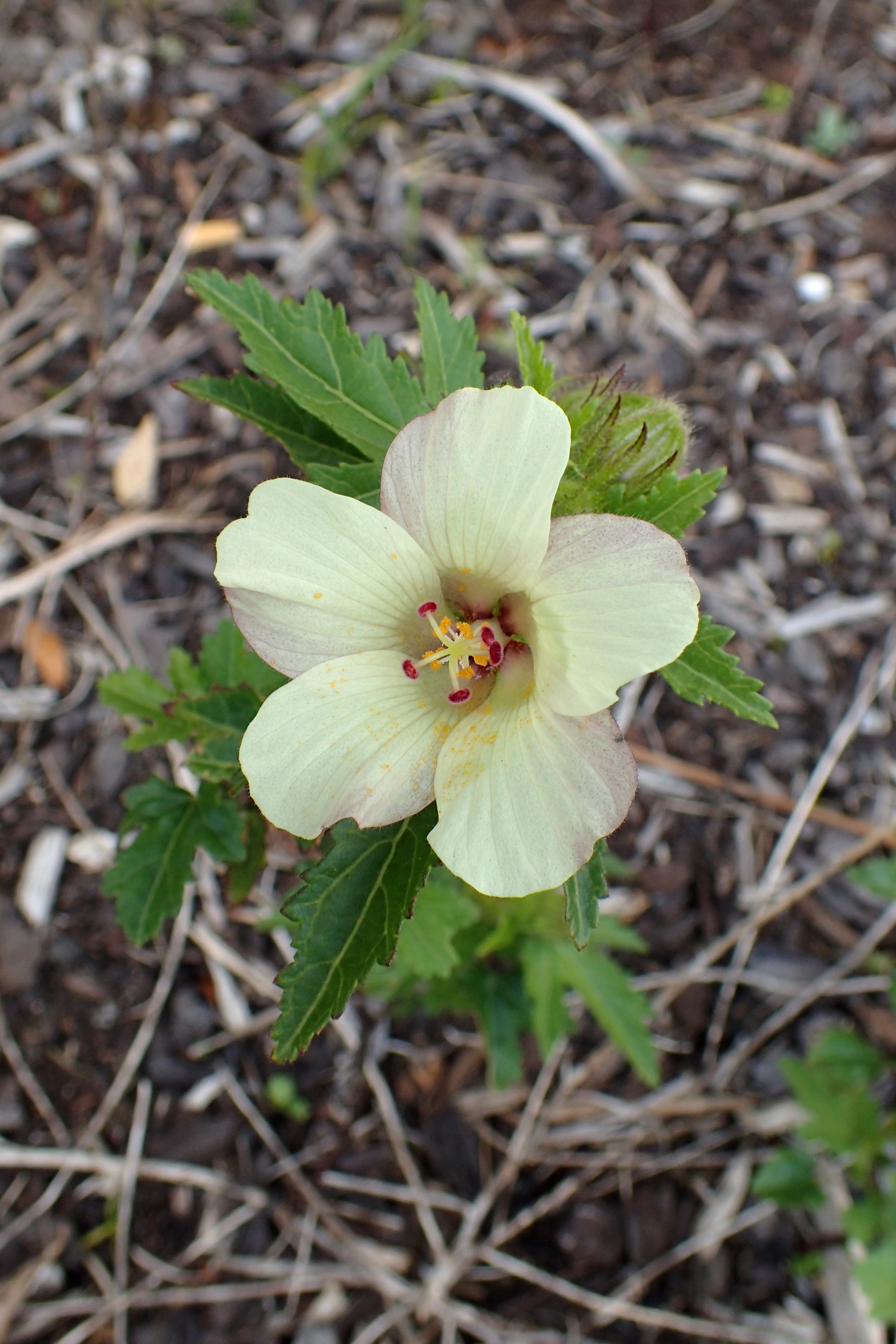

Scientific classification
- Kingdom: Plantae
- Clade: Tracheophytes
- Clade: Angiosperms
- Clade: Eudicots
- Clade: Rosids
- Order: Malvales
- Family: Malvaceae
- Genus: Hibiscus
- Species: H. richardsonii

Binomial name
- Hibiscus richardsonii Sweet ex Lindl.

Synonyms
- Hibiscus aff. trionum (AK 218967; North Island); Hibiscus trionoides G.Don

= Hibiscus richardsonii =

Species of flowering plant

Hibiscus richardsonii, commonly known as puarangi in New Zealand, is a species of flowering plant, a hibiscus, in the mallow family, Malvaceae. It is rare in New Zealand, and more commonly seen in eastern New South Wales in Australia. The species was named in honour of the plant collector and convict, John Richardson.

== Distribution and habitat ==
It is native to parts of Australia and New Zealand. In Australia it is found in coastal and subcoastal areas of New South Wales, from the Clarence River district in the north of the state to the Bermagui district in the state's south. In New Zealand it is found on the eastern side of the North Island, from the northern end of the island (Te Paki Ecological District) to Hicks Bay, including the Cavalli, Great Barrier and Mayor / Tuhua islands.

== See also ==
- Puarangi
