= Puarangi =

Puarangi is the common name for several species of hibiscus found in New Zealand.

- Hibiscus diversifolius, also known as swamp hibiscus, and prickly hibiscus. Native to New Zealand and numerous other countries. Petals are pale yellow with a maroon base, making a maroon centre to the flower.
- Hibiscus richardsonii. Native to New Zealand and New South Wales, Australia. Petals are entirely pale yellow.
- Hibiscus trionum. Naturalised in New Zealand – historically considered native, until the native H. richardsonii was recognised as a separate species. Petals are pale yellow with a maroon base, making a maroon centre to the flower.
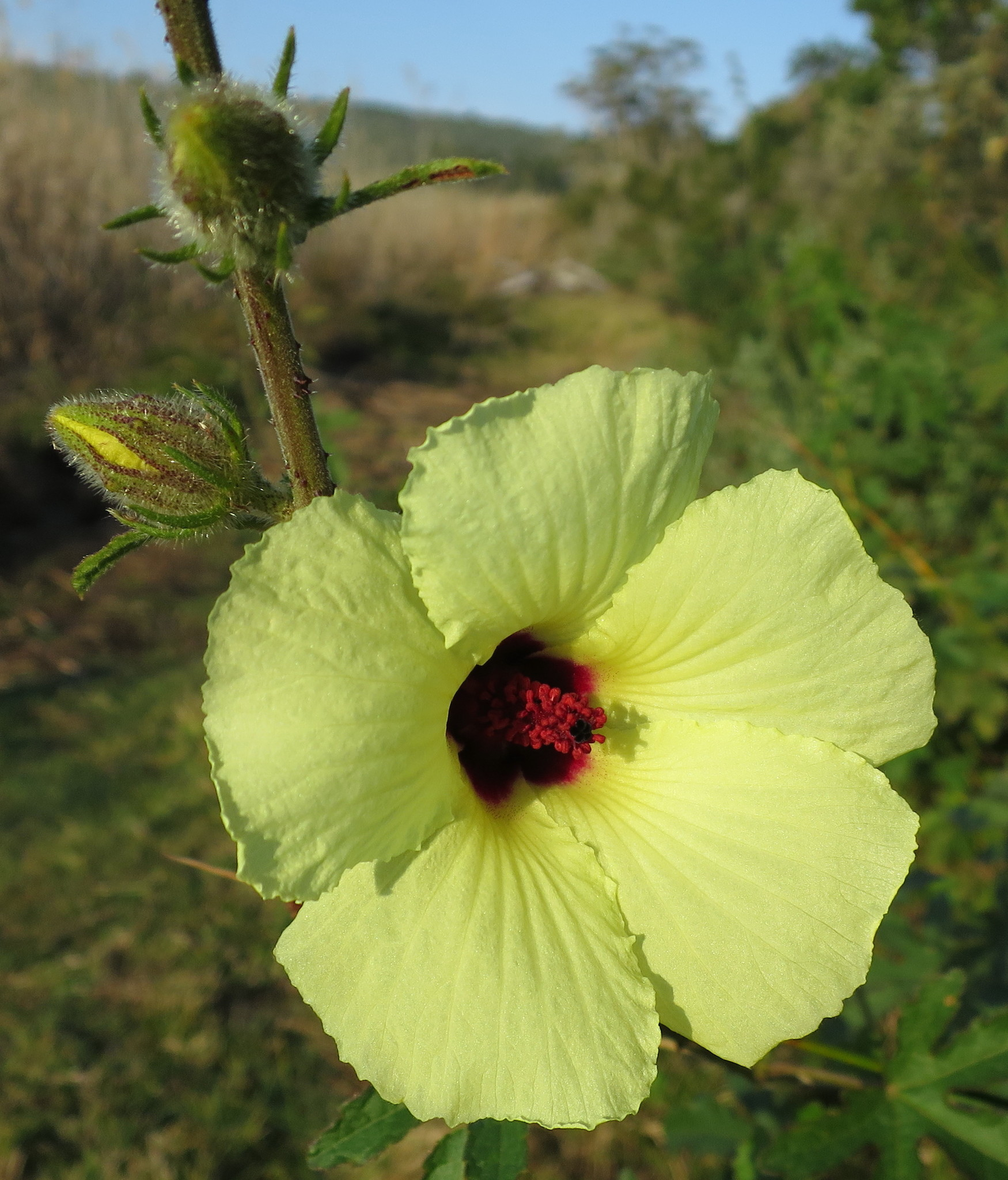
Hibiscus diversifolius

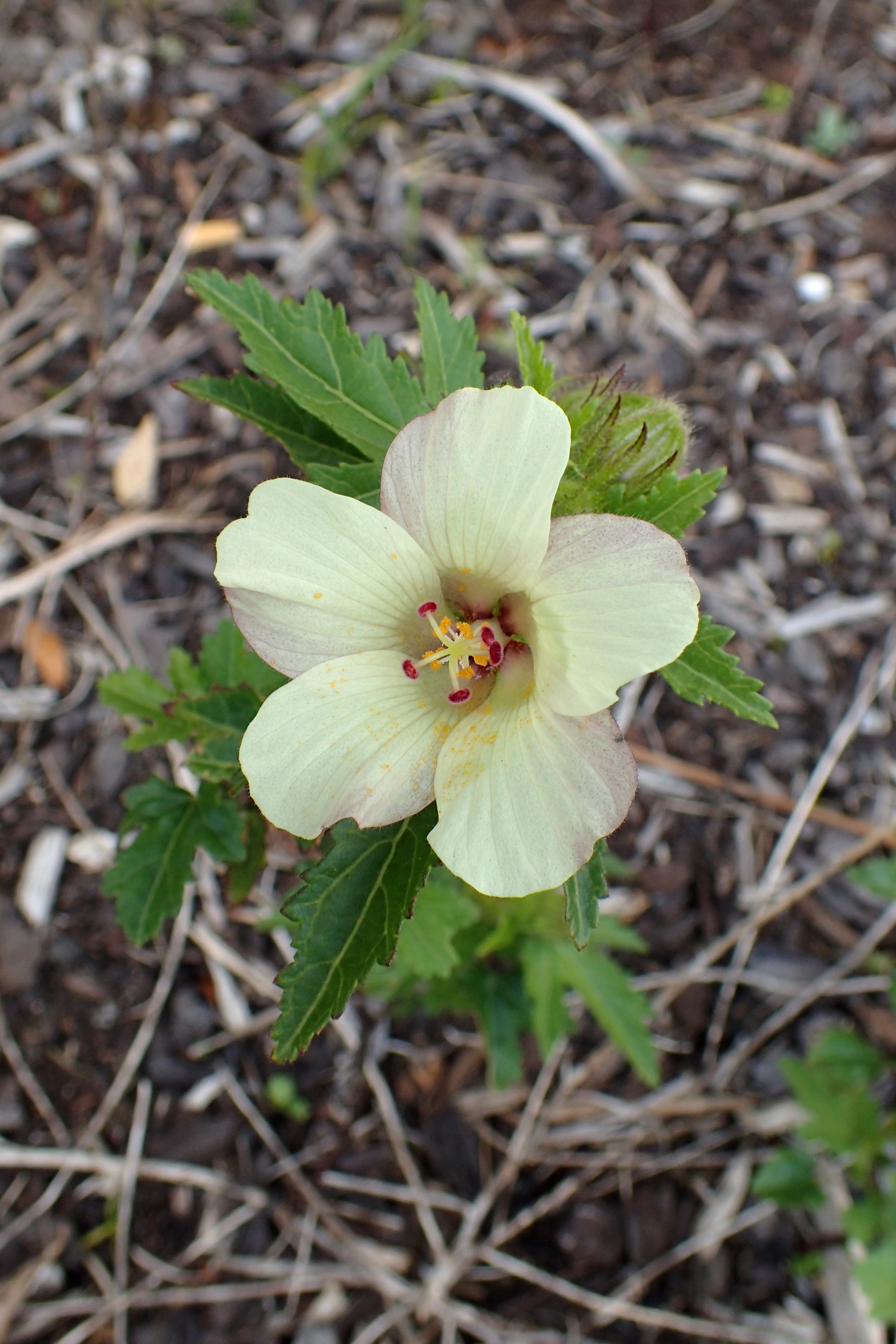
Hibiscus richardsonii

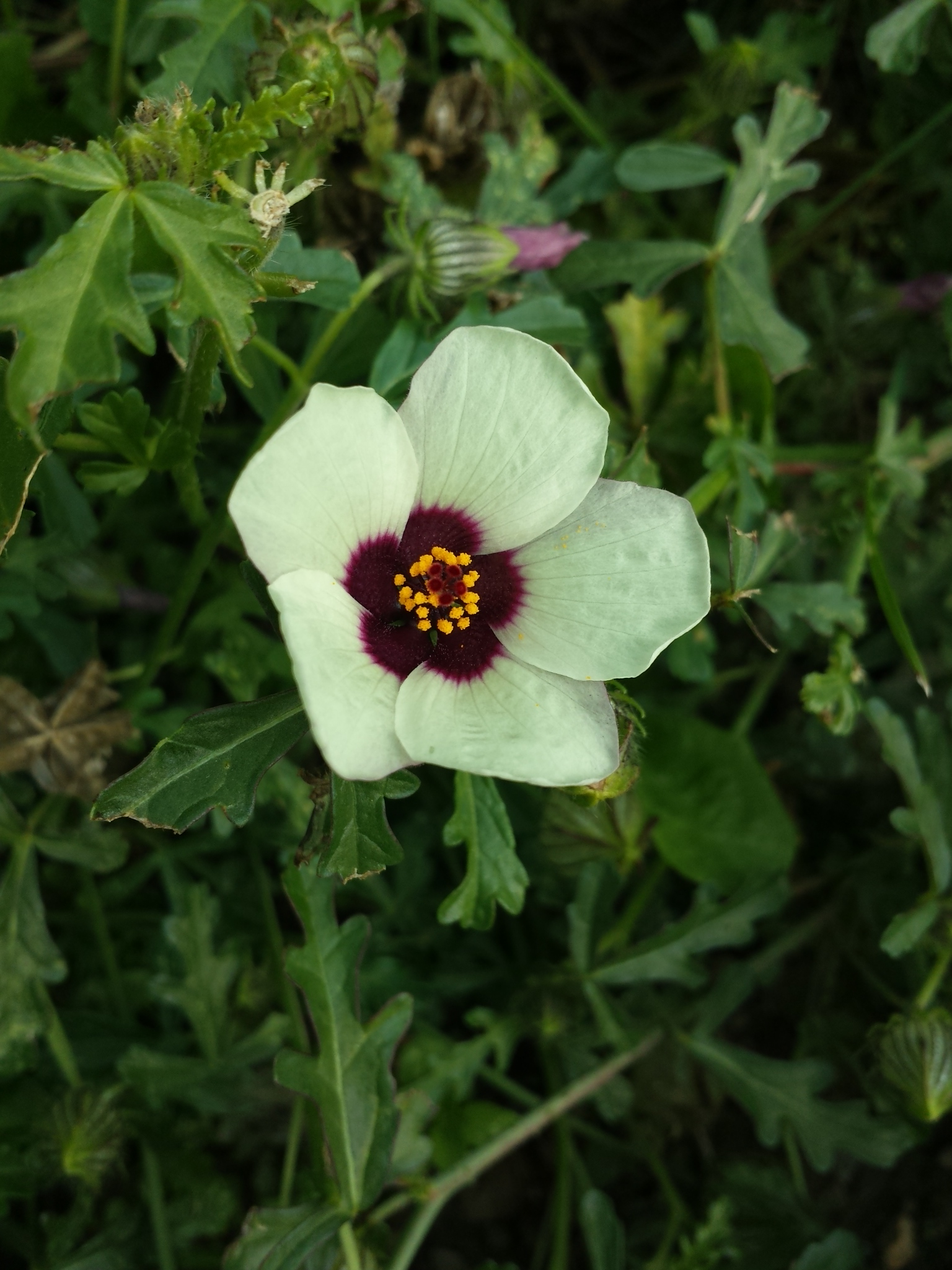
Hibiscus trionum
