= Edmund Edgar =

English painter

- Born: 1804; England
- Died: 21 June 1854 (aged 49–50); Sydney, New South Wales, Australia

Edmund Bults (1804 – 21 June 1854), better known by his alias Edmund Edgar, was an English-born painter, engraver and lithographer who was transported as a convict to the British penal colony (now the Australian state) of New South Wales.

== Life ==
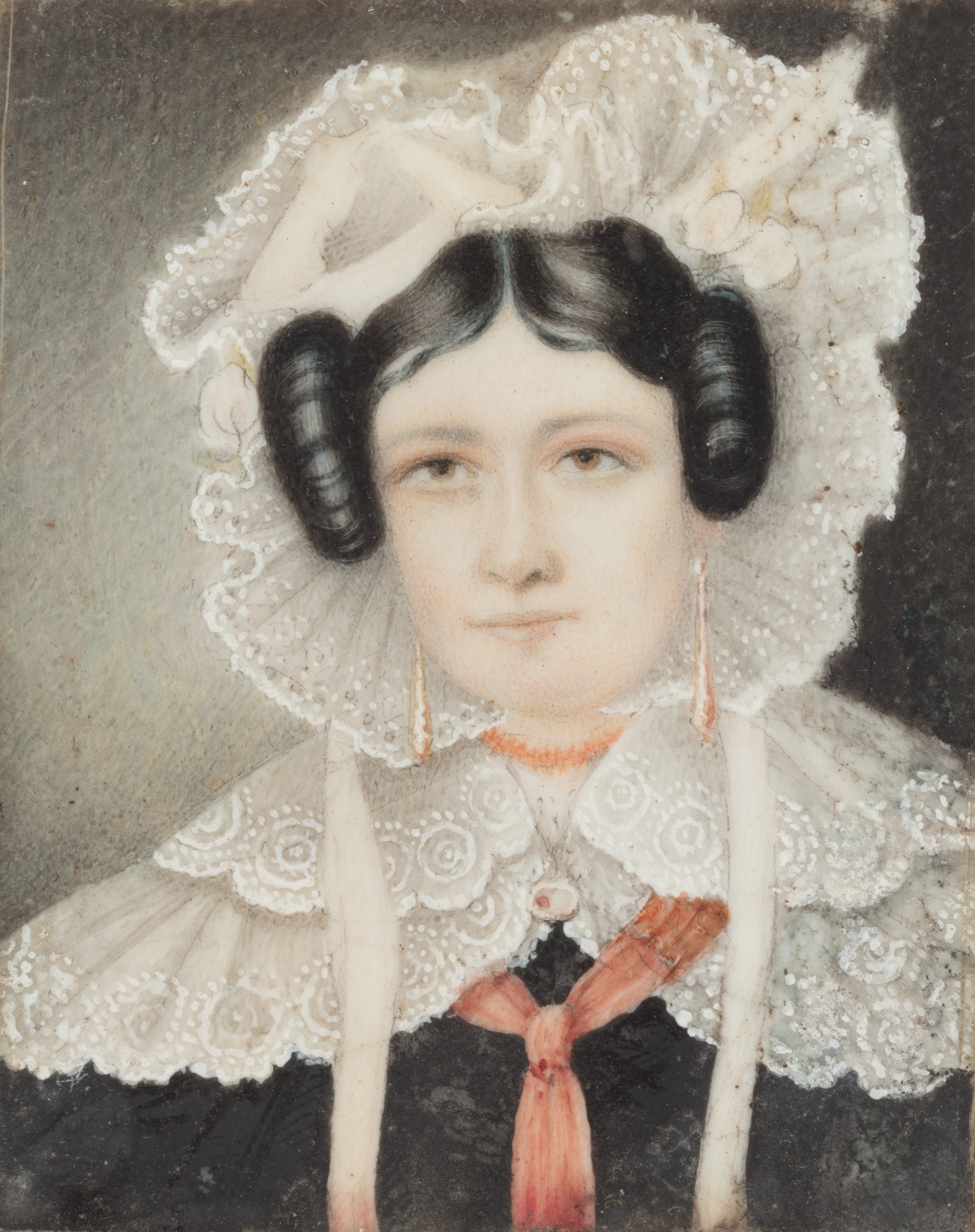
Edgar is known for his portraits of members of Sydney's ex-convict emancipist class, including that of Mary Ann Turner (pictured), painted in 1835 (Sydney Living Museums).

Born in England in 1804, Edgar worked as a house painter, engraver and lithographer in London. In 1825, at London's Old Bailey, he was convicted of robbery and initially sentenced to death, but due to his "respectable" connections, his skills as an artist, and also possibly his "elegant appearance", Edgar was instead transported for life to the penal colony of New South Wales, Australia. He arrived in Sydney aboard the convict ship Marquis of Huntly on 13 September 1826, and was quickly assigned to leading colonial artist Augustus Earle, who regarded the convict as sufficiently talented to join him at his lithographic press and help produce Views in Australia—an album containing the first lithographic views printed in the colony.

After working for Earle, Edgar was sought after by a succession of employers, including engraver and copperplate printer John Carmichael, and schoolmasters John Gilcrist and Dr Wilks, both of whom employed him as a drawing master and teacher of penmanship. In October 1828, Edgar's work was interrupted when he began a three-month stint in an iron gang for being "drunk & in a disorderly house at a late hour of night".

Receiving his ticket of leave in 1843, Edgar was conditionally pardoned in 1844, and from then on he seems to have focused on painting portrait miniatures, many of his subjects being emancipists (ex-convicts) and their children. While he is known to have established a studio in Argyle Street, in The Rocks, little else has been confirmed about the final decade of Edgar's life. He ended up destitute and a resident of the Sydney Benevolent Asylum, where he died on 21 June 1854. Decades later, Samuel Elyard, one of his former pupil's at Gilcrist's academy, remembered Edgar as a man of "kind disposition" who was "glad to impart a knowledge of Art to anyone who had a taste for it", and who "painted miniatures very nicely, and had he kept steadily to his profession, would perhaps have been an eminent artist".

== Gallery of works ==
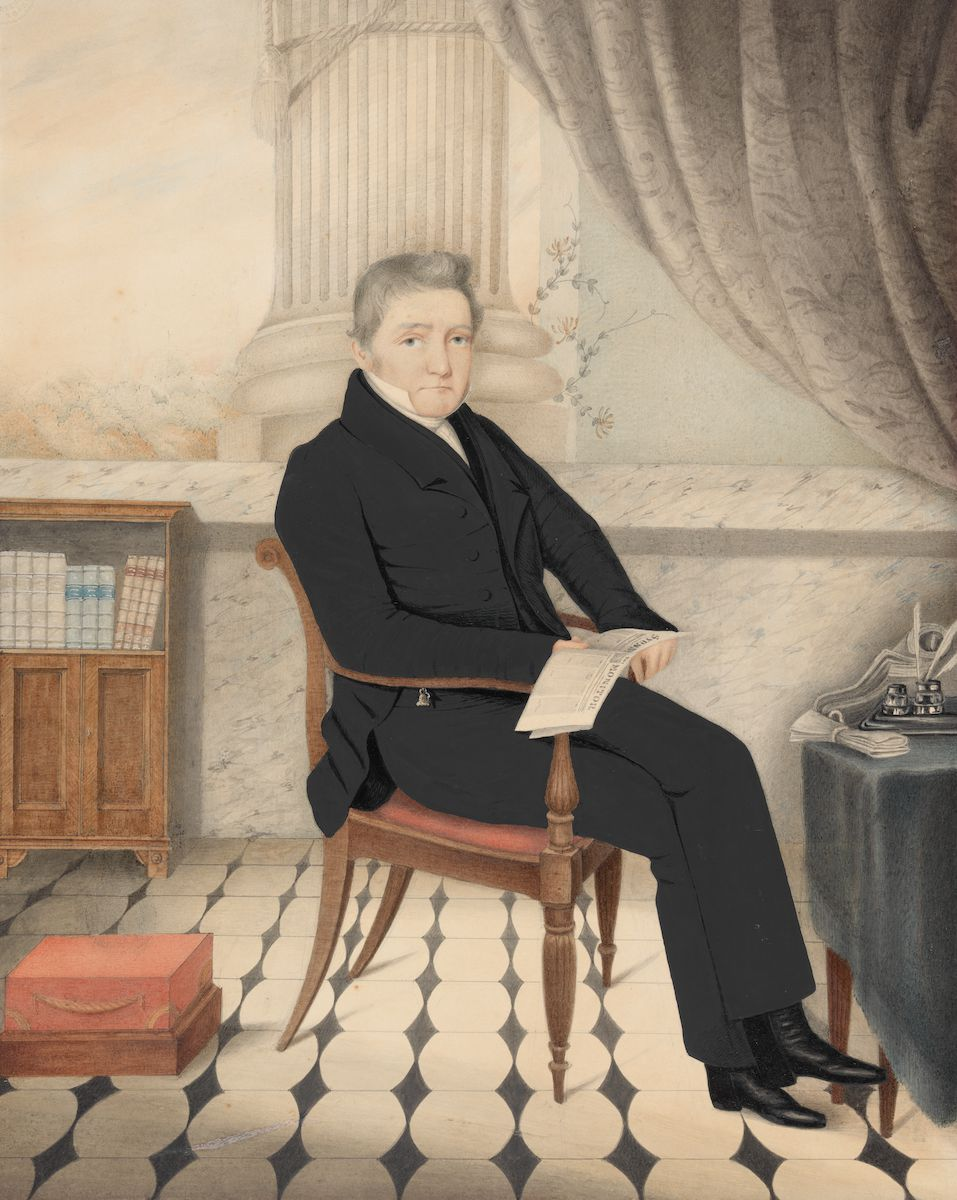
Richard Fitzgerald, c. 1838, National Portrait Gallery

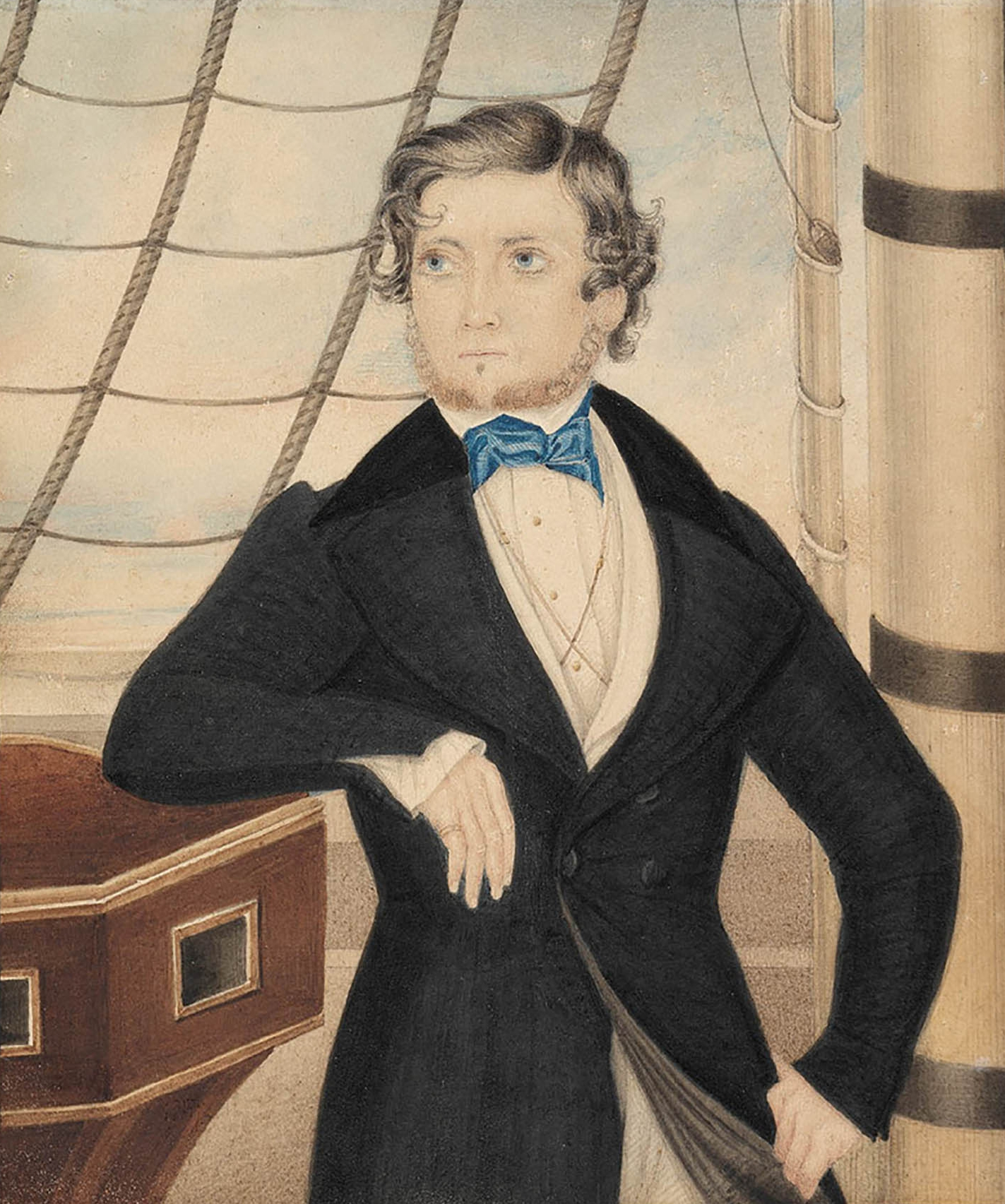
Portrait of an Unidentified Man, 1842, State Library of New South Wales

== See also ==
- List of convicts transported to Australia
- Australian art
