= John Richardson (convict) =

Australian convict and botanist

- Born: John Matthew Richardson; April 28, 1797; Slinfold, Sussex, England
- Died: July 28, 1882 (aged 85); Singleton, New South Wales, Australia
- Occupation(s): Convict, botanical collector
- Known for: Participating in several expeditions

John Matthew Richardson (28 April 1797 – 28 July 1882) was an Australian convict who accompanied several exploring expeditions as a botanical collector.

== Biography ==
Richardson was born in England on 28 April 1797 at Slinfold in Sussex. He worked as a nurseryman at Horsham, Sussex, until convicted in March 1816 of larceny and sentenced to seven years' transportation. Transported to Australia, he arrived in Sydney in September 1817, and was probably assigned to work in the government gardens there. By 1821 he had earned a full pardon, and that year he was sent back to England in charge of a collection of plants and seeds. However, in March 1822 he was convicted of house-breaking. He was sentenced to death, but this was remitted to transportation for life, and he was once more transported to Australia. Arriving at Hobart in November 1822, he was assigned work as a gardener, until the New South Wales colonial botanist Charles Fraser arranged for him to be transferred to Sydney so that he could oversee the government gardens there.

How Richardson spent the years 1823 to 1826 is not clear. Hall (1984) states that he was a member of John Oxley's expeditions of 1823 and 1824; but Short (1990) considers this merely a possibility, despite quoting a statement by Thomas Mitchell asserting that he did, and noting that Richardson provided seed from the Port Macquarie region to an English nursery before 1825. It is also possible that Richardson accompanied William Baxter to King George Sound in 1824.

In February 1826, Richardson, by then married, was sent to take change of the garden of a new settlement at Fort Dundas on Melville Island. In August that year he is recorded as having accompanied the Mermaid on a visit to Timor to obtain seeds. When the settlement failed in 1829, Richardson returned to Sydney. The following year his wife died, and a year after that his ticket of leave was revoked for bad behaviour. He was assigned to a settler at Cooks River, until he was sent to work on an Iron Gang on Mount Gibraltar near Bowral in 1834. The same year he absconded and was recaptured. In 1836 he was appointed botanical collector to Thomas Mitchell's third expedition. During Mitchell's expedition Richardson discovered many new plants, of which John Lindley described 68 as new species. In his private journal, Mitchell never once refers to Richardson by name, but mentions the "collector" four times; and even "collector" is purged from the published version of the journal, Mitchell replacing it with even vaguer language such as "we". Yet, despite giving Richardson no recognition in his journal, Mitchell subsequently recommended Richardson receive a conditional pardon for his "indefatigable" efforts.

Richardson continued to collect botanical collections, providing specimens for the Sydney Botanic Gardens and the Australian Museum. In later life he moved to Singleton, remarried, and eventually died on 28 July 1882 at the age of 85.

== Legacy ==
Richardson's name is commemorated in the plant species names Hibiscus richardsonii and Alyxia richardsonii (now A. ruscifolia), both of which were raised from seed collected by Richardson. He is also the collector of the type specimen of Acacia calamifolia.

On 10 July 2002 a kauri pine was planted in his honour at the Darwin Botanic Gardens.

== See also ==
- List of convicts transported to Australia
