= Richard Browne (painter) =

Australian convict artist and illustrator (1776–1824)

- Born: 1771; Dublin, Ireland
- Died: 11 January 1824 (aged 52–53); Sydney Australia
- Occupations: Artist, illustrator

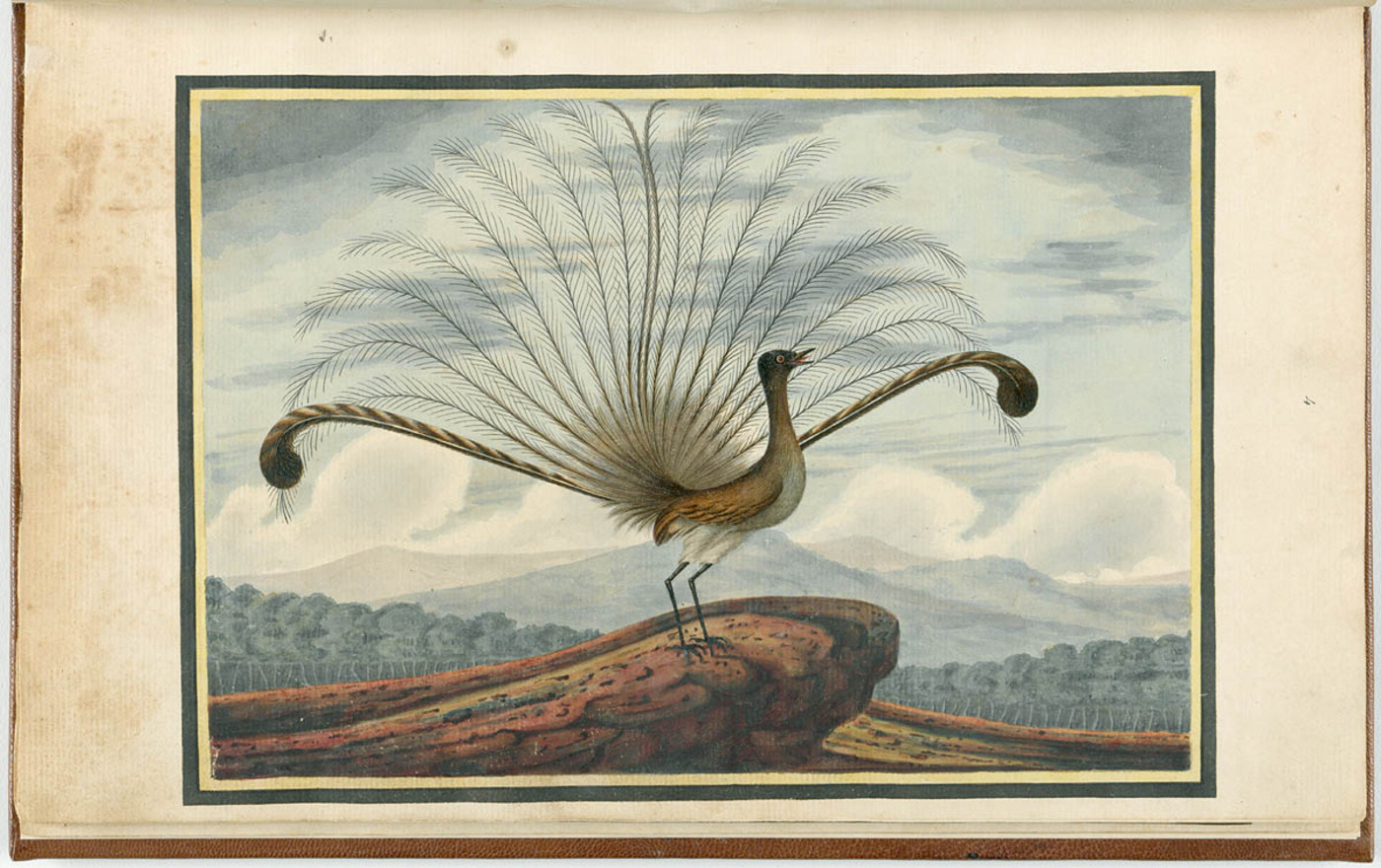
Lyrebird, painted by Richard Browne ca. 1813

Richard Browne (1771 – 11 January 1824) was an artist and illustrator who was transported from his native Ireland to what was then the colony of New South Wales, Australia. After his sentence was completed in Newcastle in 1817 he lived in Sydney selling watercolour illustrations of natural history subjects — particularly birds — and of Indigenous Australians.

== Early life ==
Richard Browne was born in Dublin, Ireland in 1771. He was convicted and then transported in 1810, possibly for the crime of forgery.

== Life in New South Wales ==
Richard Browne arrived at Sydney in July 1811 on the Providence.

=== Newcastle ===
In October 1811 he was sent to Newcastle for committing a second offence and remained there until 1817. During this period he married, or formed a liaison with, fellow convict Sarah Coates who had been transported on the Wanstead in 1814. They had at least two daughters who were born in Newcastle: Mary P. (born c.1815) and Eliza (born c.1816).

=== Sydney ===
After 1817, Richard Browne spent the rest of his life in Sydney, where he was designated 'free by servitude’.

== Career as an artist ==
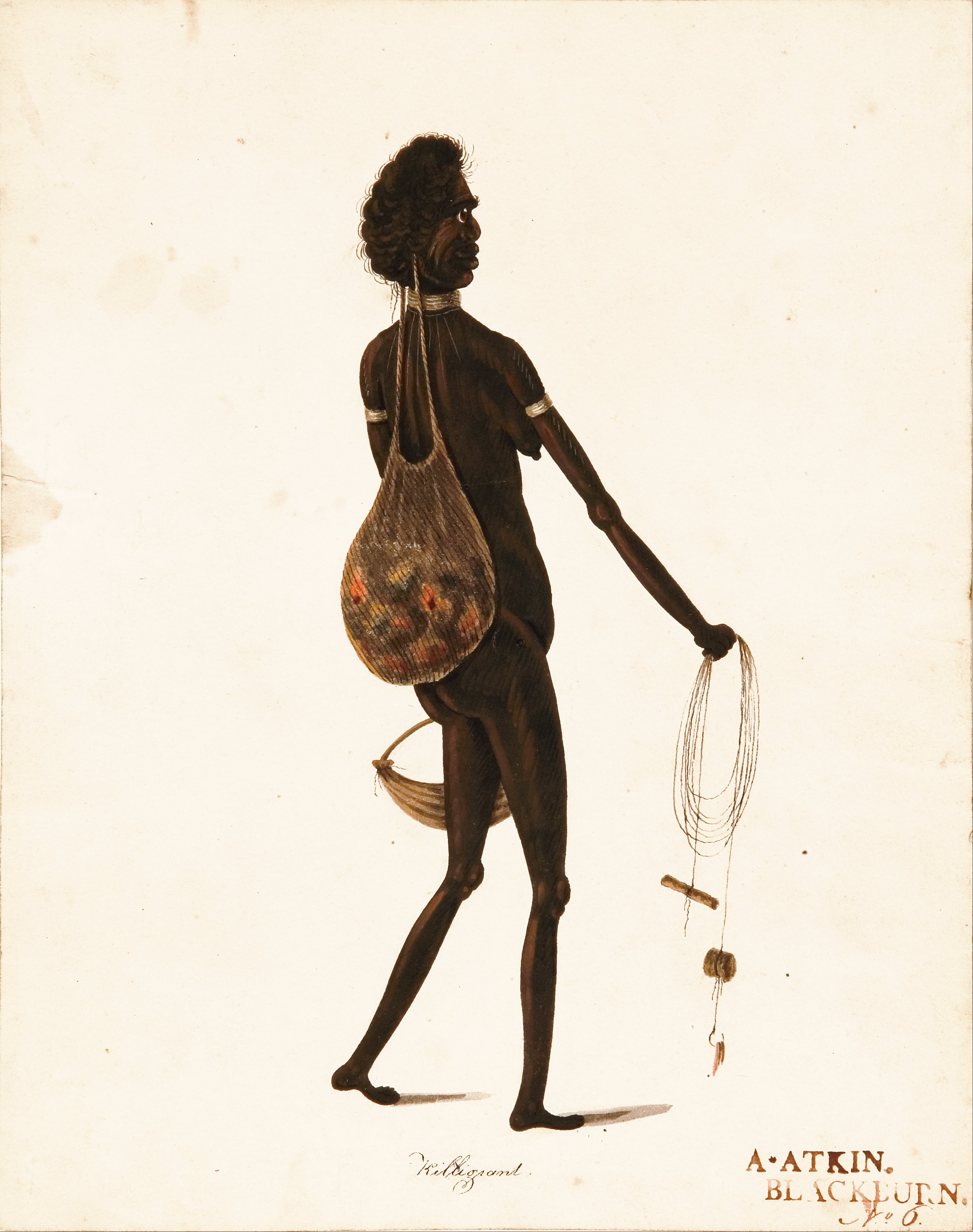
Richard Browne Killigrant ca. 1820

In Newcastle, Browne met the commandant of Newcastle Lieutenant Thomas Skottowe. Skottowe was interested in natural history and commissioned Browne to create drawings of his collections to illustrate a manuscript entitled, Select Specimens From Nature of the / Birds Animals &c &c of New South Wales, Collected and Arranged by Thomas Skottowe Esqr. The Drawings By T.R. Browne. N.S.W. Newcastle New South Wales 1813. (held State Library of New South Wales) As with Joseph Lycett, Browne contributed many of the original watercolours for Major James Wallis' An historical account of the Colony of New South Wales which were engraved by Philip Slaeger.

Richard Browne's most characteristic work is from the emancipist part of his life between 1817 and 1821. His illustrations from this period focus on the Indigenous peoples of the Sydney area. Several of these are included in A collection of portraits, predominantly of Aborigines of New South Wales and Tasmania, ca. 1817–1849. In these illustrations Browne employed a more exaggerated caricature style which owed much to the silhouette portrait tradition. These illustrations were often sold as souvenirs in Sydney and appear to have reflected the demand of the time.

== Personal life and Death ==
Richard Browne had 6 children, Mary, Eliza, Esther, Anne, Sarah and William (born posthumously). He died in Sydney on 11 January 1824, according to the burial register of Sydney's St Philip's Church.
