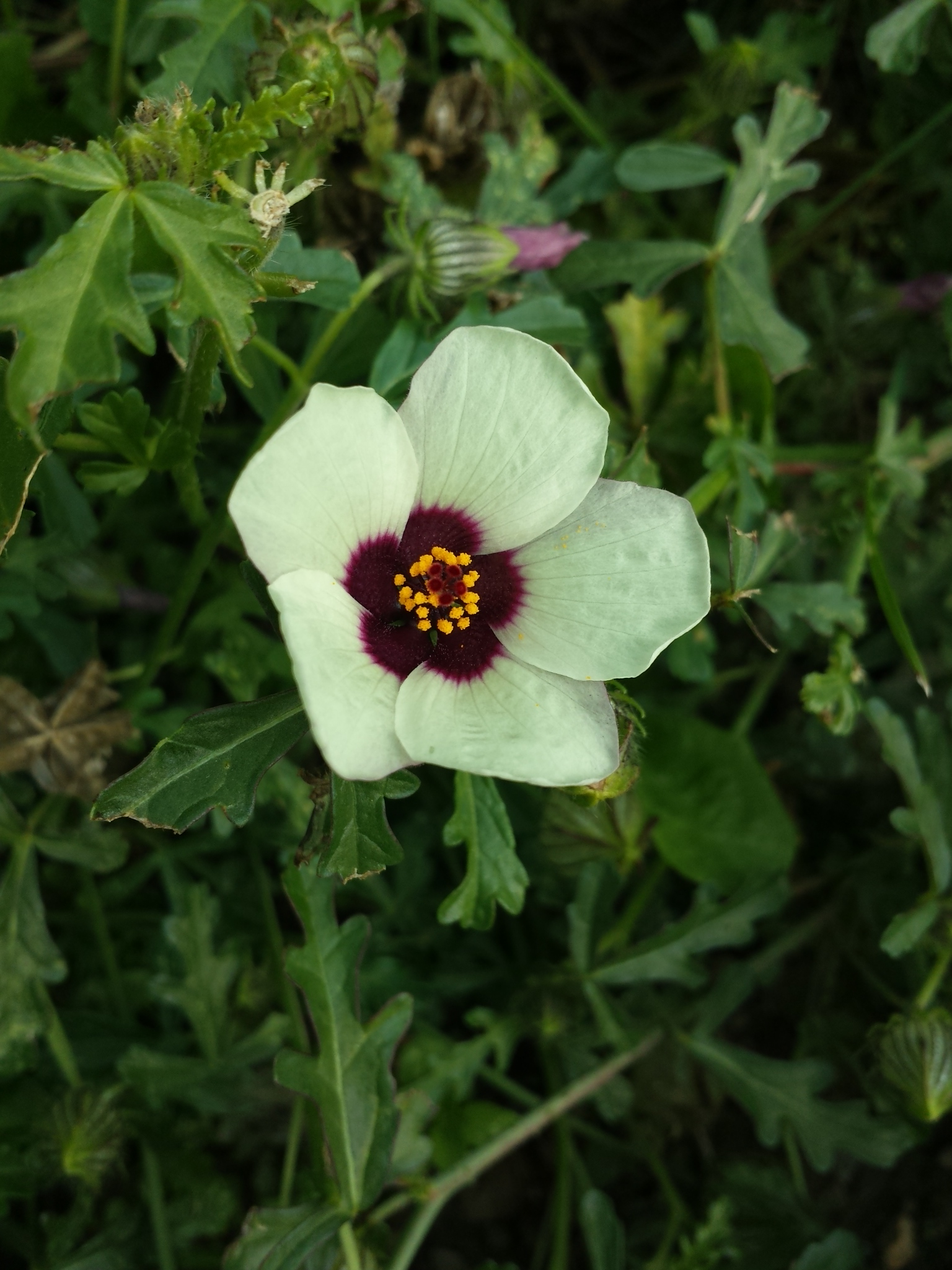

Scientific classification
- Kingdom: Plantae
- Clade: Embryophytes
- Clade: Tracheophytes
- Clade: Spermatophytes
- Clade: Angiosperms
- Clade: Eudicots
- Clade: Rosids
- Order: Malvales
- Family: Malvaceae
- Genus: Hibiscus
- Species: H. trionum

Binomial name
- Hibiscus trionum L.

Synonyms
- Hibiscus dissectus Wall.; Hibiscus vesicarius Cav.; Ketmia trionum (L.) Scop.; Trionum annuum Medik.; Trionum trionum (L.) Wooton & Standl.

= Hibiscus trionum =

Species of flowering plant

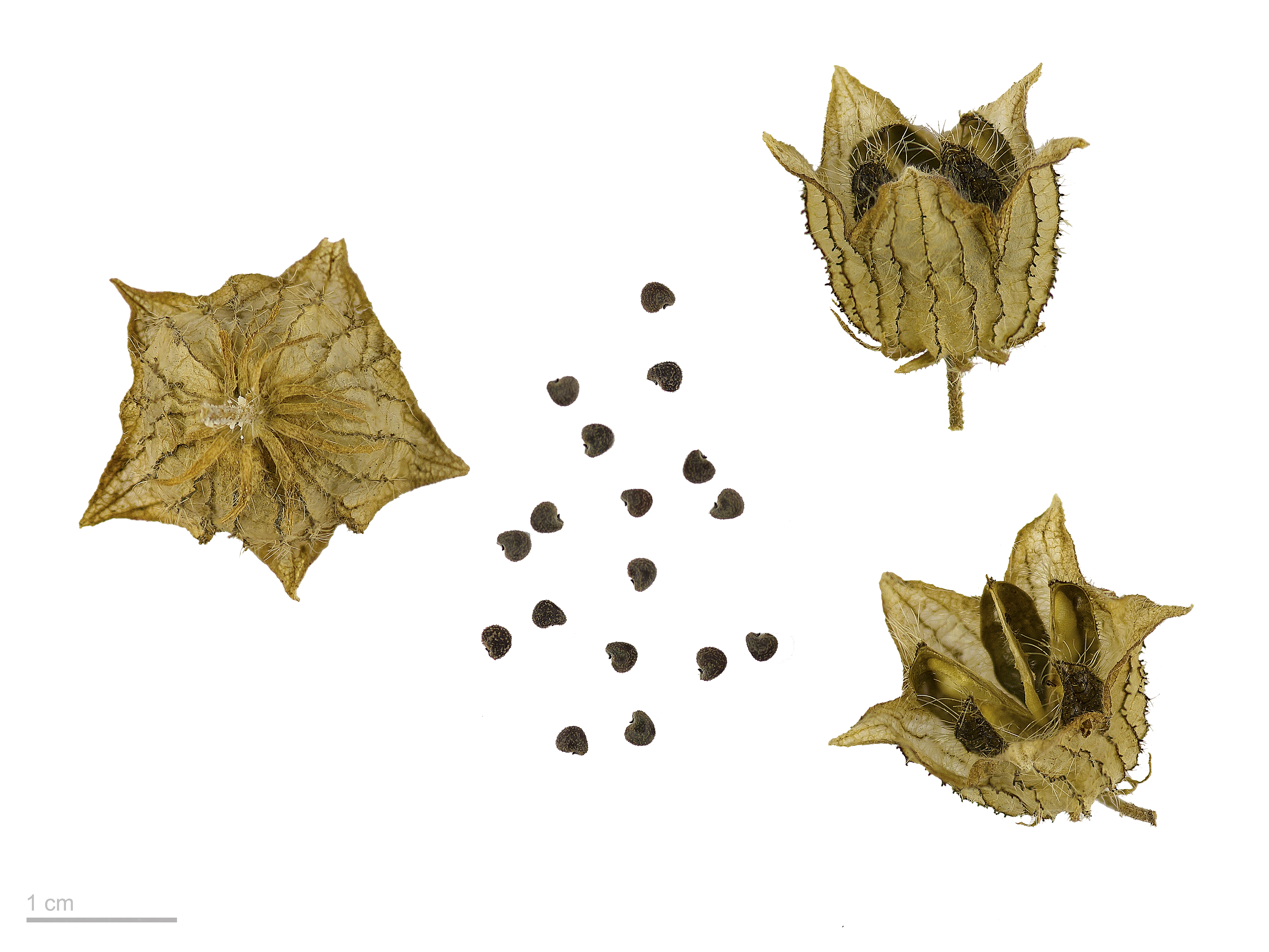
Hibiscus trionum – MHNT

Hibiscus trionum, commonly called flower-of-an-hour, bladder hibiscus, bladder ketmia, bladder weed, puarangi and venice mallow, is an annual plant native to the Old World tropics and subtropics. It has spread throughout southern Europe both as a weed and cultivated as a garden plant. It has been introduced to the United States as an ornamental where it has become naturalized as a weed of cropland and vacant land, particularly on disturbed ground.

== Description ==
The plant grows to a height of 20–50 centimetres (8–20 in), sometimes exceeding 80 cm (30 in), and has white or yellow flowers with a purple centre. In the deeply pigmented centre of the flower, the surface features striations, which have been the subject of controversy about whether they act as a diffraction grating, creating iridescence.

The pollinated but unripe seedpods look like oriental paper lanterns, less than 25 mm (1 in) across, pale green with purple highlights.

The flowers of Hibiscus trionum can set seed via both outcrossing and self-pollination. During the first few hours after anthesis, the style and stigma are erect and receptive to receive pollen from other plants. In the absence of pollen donation, the style bends and makes contact with the anthers of the same flower, inducing self-pollination. Although outcrossing plants seem to perform better than self-pollinating plants, this form of reproductive assurance might have contributed to the success of H. trionum plants in several environments.

=== Photonic properties ===
Initial studies showed that artificial replicas of the flower surface produced iridescence that bees could recognise. Later work suggested that the irregularities of the plant cells and surface resulted in the periodicity of the striations being too irregular to create clear iridescence and thus suggested that the iridescence is not visible to man and flower visiting insects. More recent papers have presented evidence that the flower is both visibly and measurably iridescent, and the striations have been shown to be sufficiently irregular to generate particularly strong scattering of light at short wavelengths, producing weak iridescence and a 'blue halo' (of which the halo is the dominant visible effect). It has also been demonstrated that the blue scattering increases the foraging efficiency of bumblebees in laboratory environments, although it remains unknown whether this effect translates to a meaningful advantage in the field.

== Gallery ==
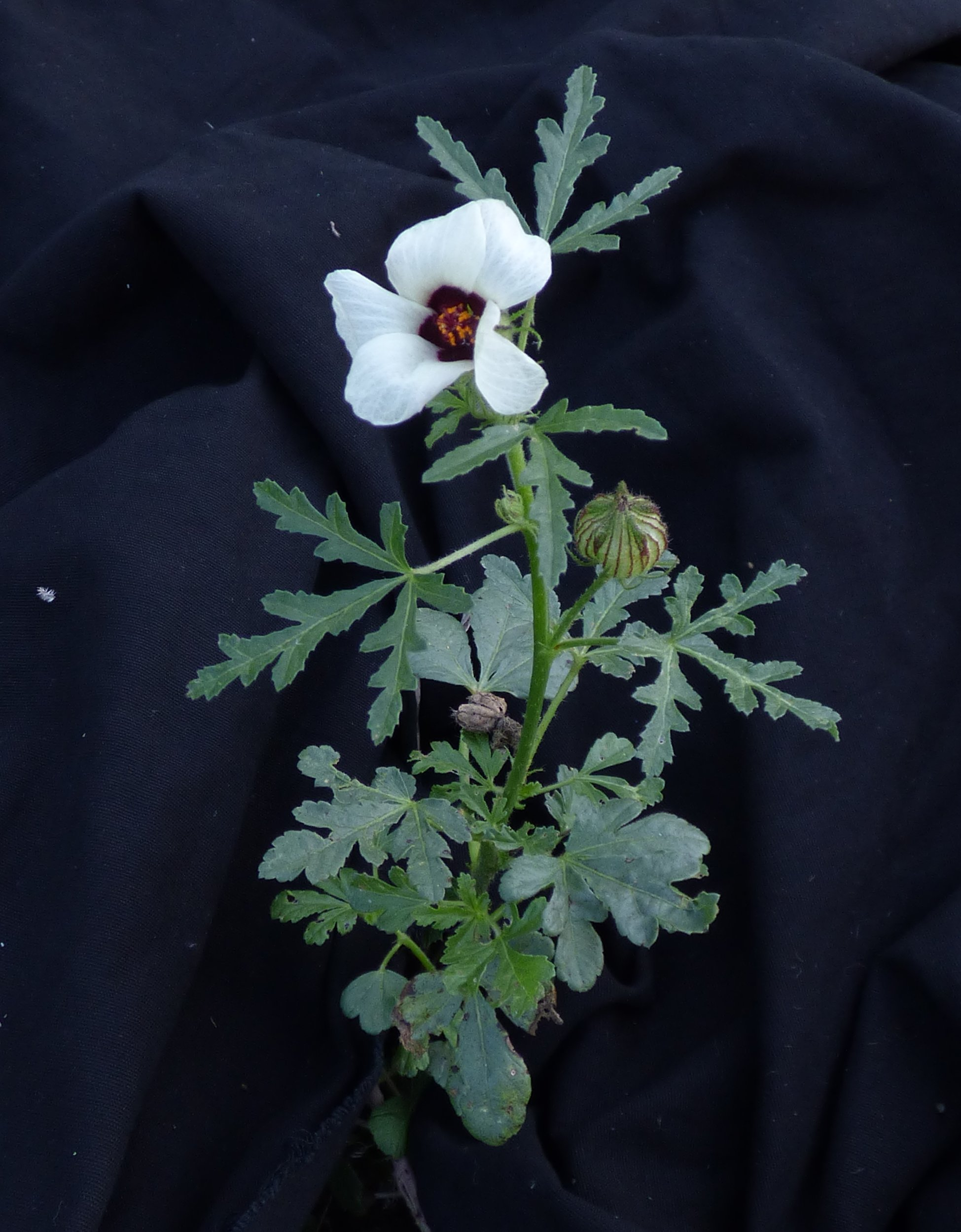
Flowering Hibiscus trionum specimen

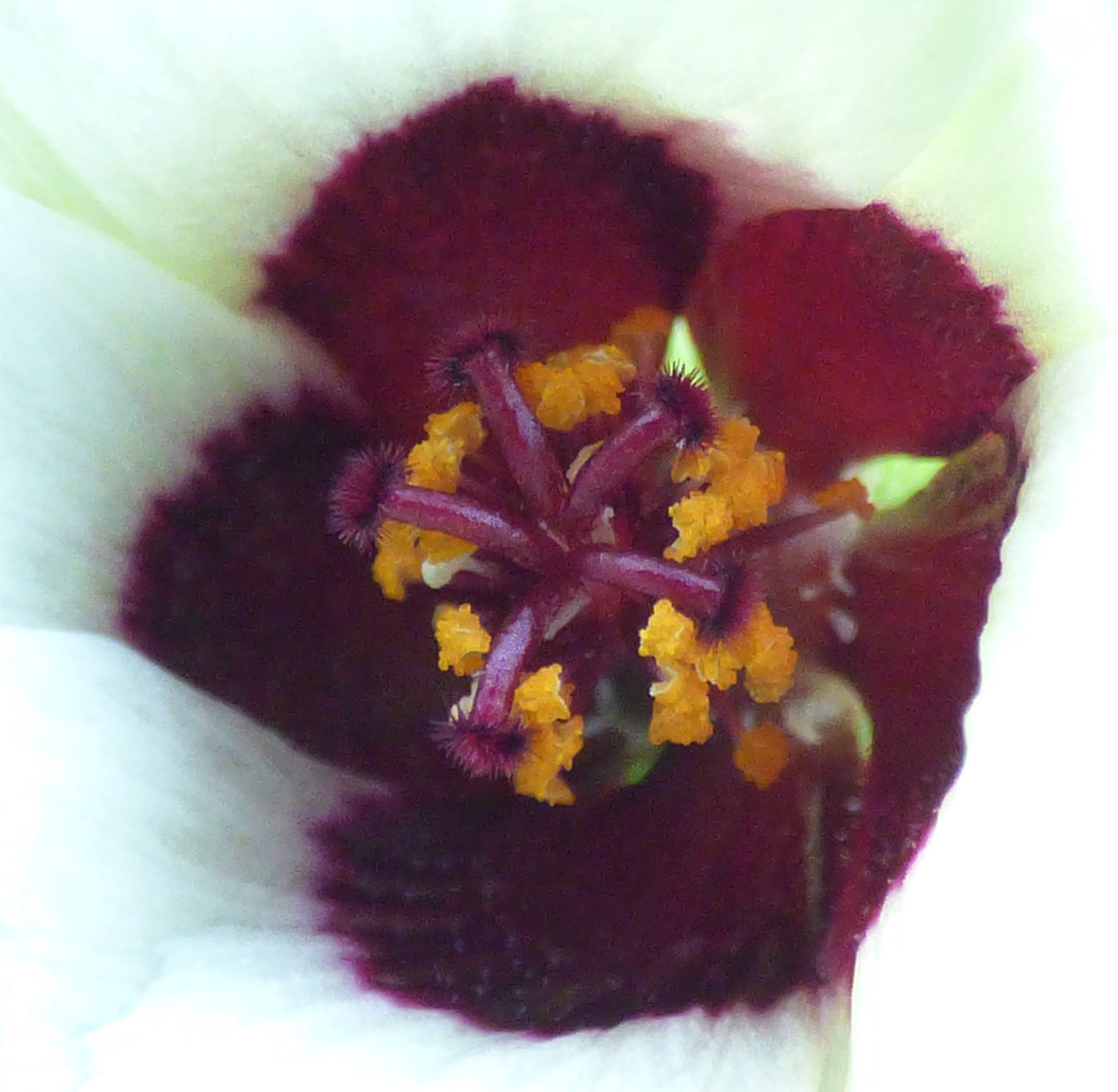
Detail of Hibiscus trionum flower

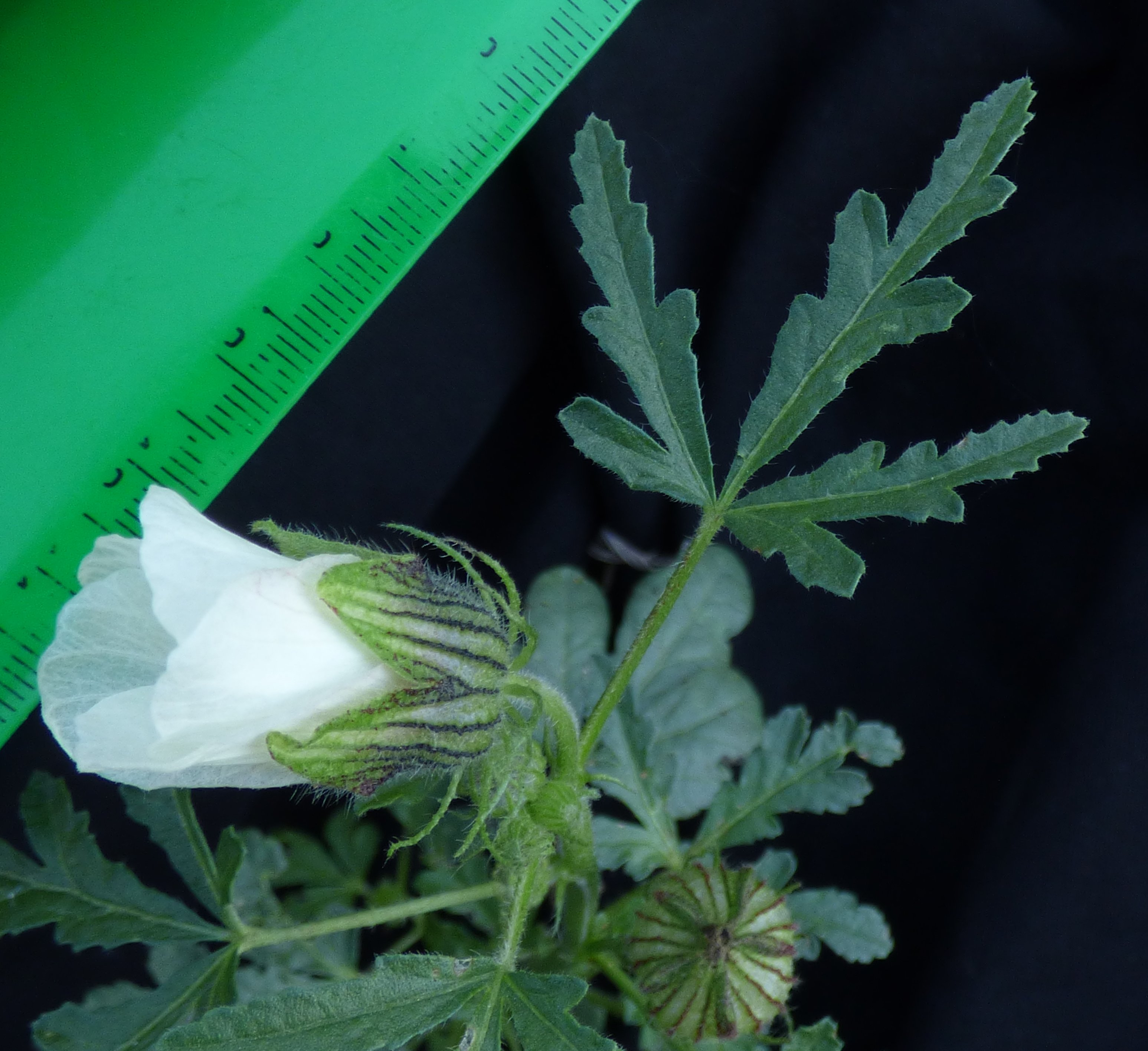
Flower, side, showing epicalyx at base and upper leaf

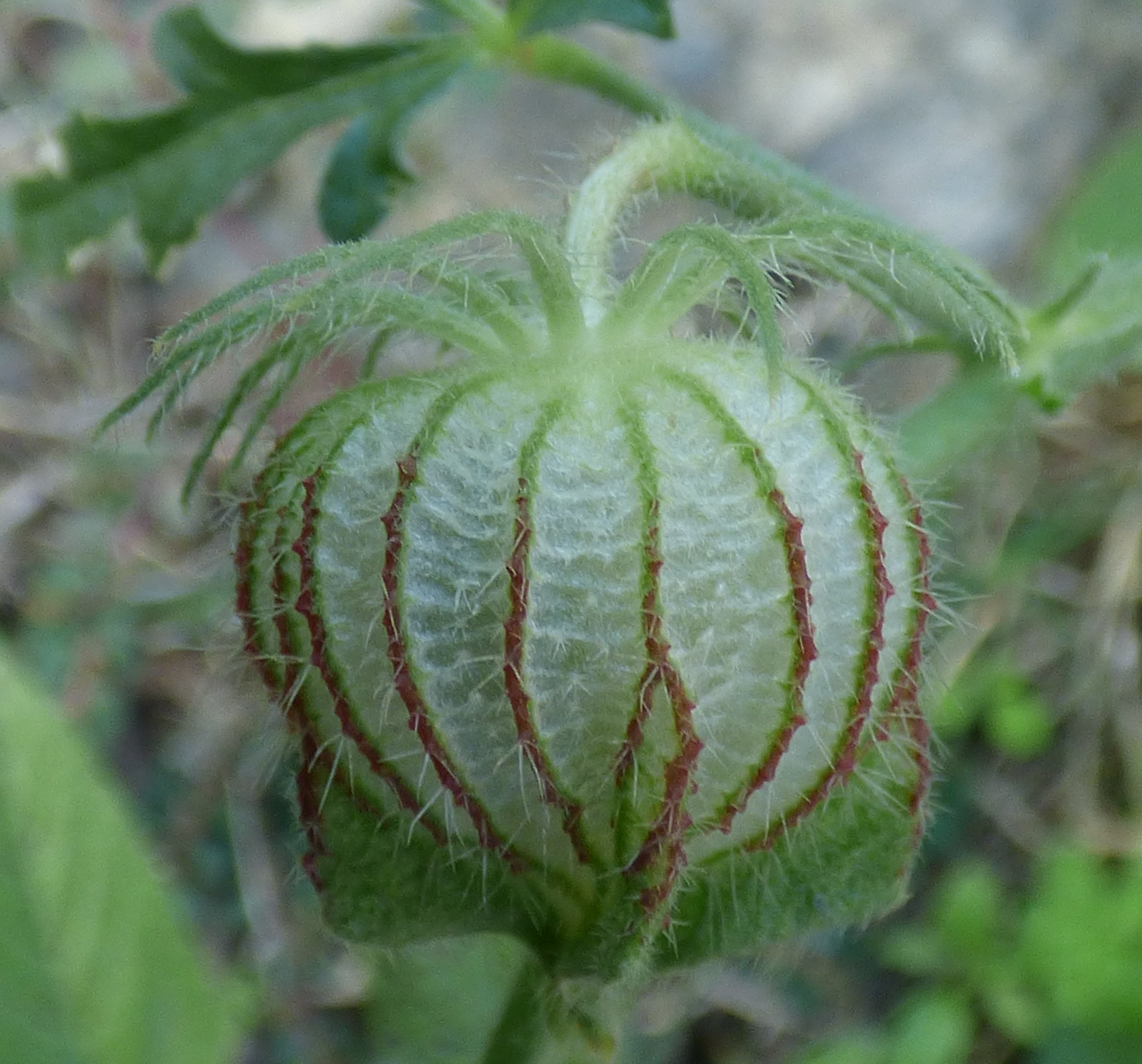
Fruiting calyx, inflated, side

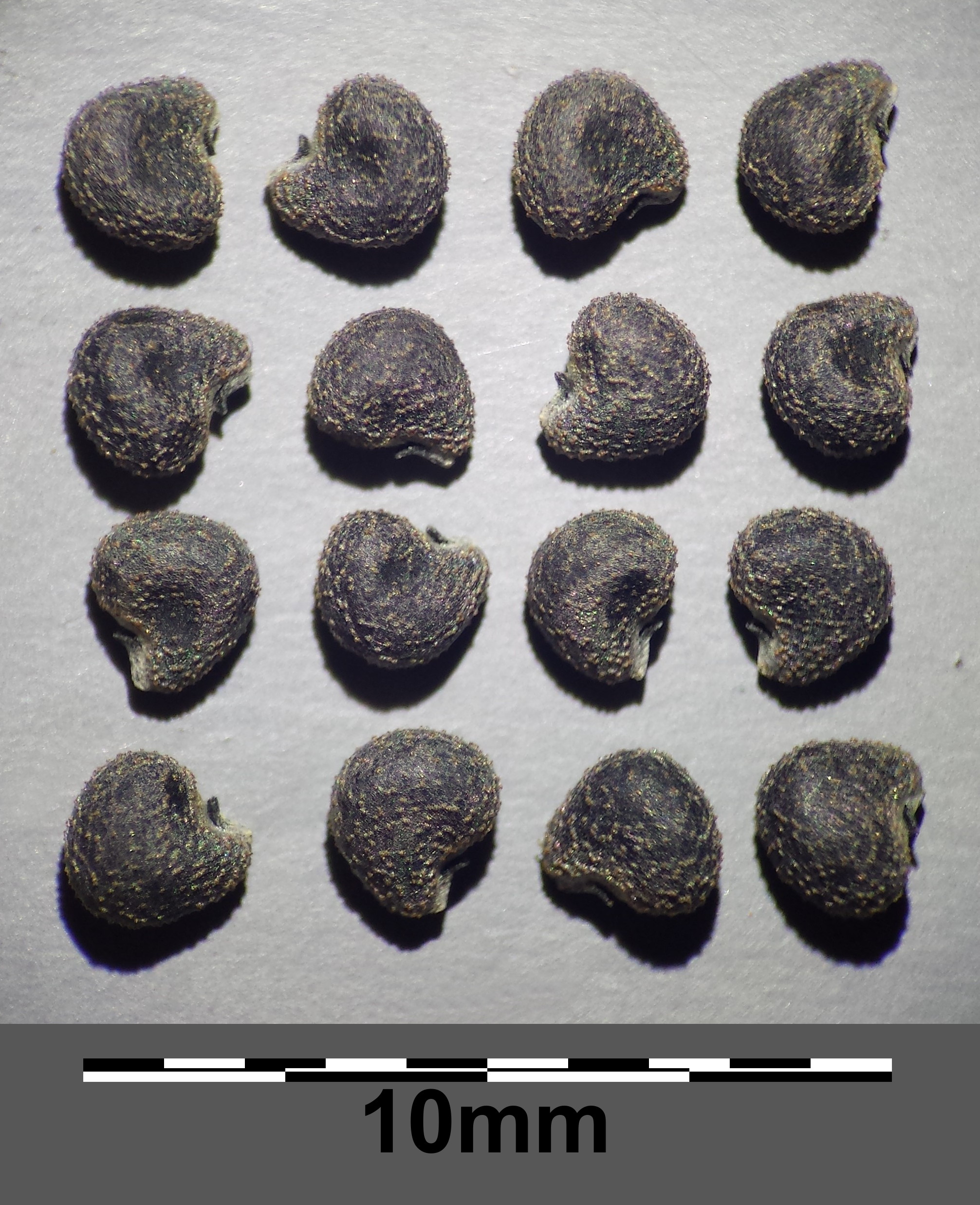
Seeds
