= Corroboree at Newcastle =

Painting attributed to Joseph Lycett

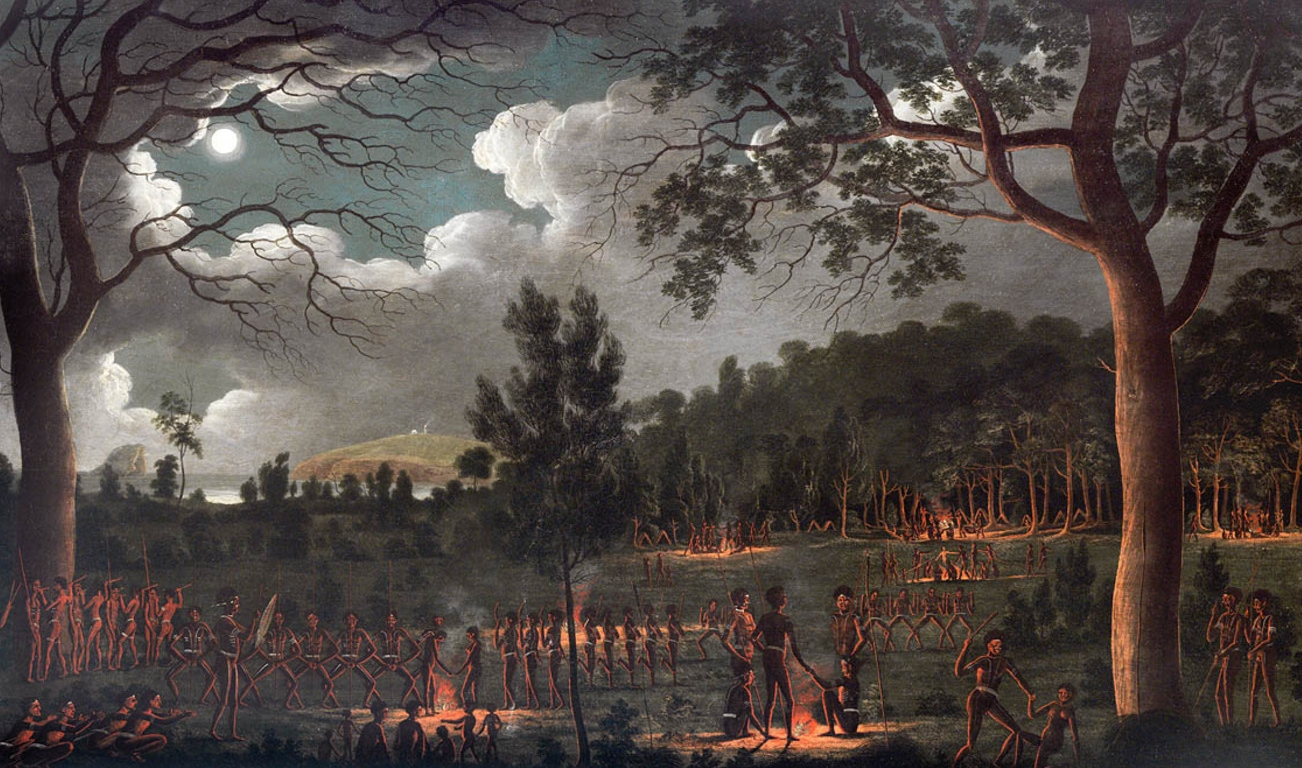
- Australian Aboriginal Corroboree at Newcastle, New South Wales, attributed to Joseph Lycett
- Material: oil on wooden panel
- Size: 70.5 x 122.4 cm
- Created: c.1818
- Present location: State Library of New South Wales
- Identification: DG 228

Corroboree at Newcastle is a painting in the collection of the State Library of New South Wales located in Sydney, New South Wales, Australia. It is the first known European oil painting to depict a night corroboree by Aboriginal Australian people.

== Description ==
Joseph Lycett was the first convict artist to broadly depict the transformation of the Australian colony into a free settlement. Some of Lycett's most effective paintings were night scenes like this one featuring Worimi men at Newcastle. In this imagined scene, Aboriginal people perform campfire ceremonies on the banks of the Hunter River, surrounded by casuarinas and mangroves, with distant Nobby's Island and the European signal station lit up by the full moon.

Lycett has depicted a number of Indigenous activities in different parts of the canvas. In one a tooth evulsion is taking place while under a tree a group of men are gathered around a fire sharing a clay pipe. James Gleeson, who attributed this painting to Captain James Wallis of the 46th Regiment, interpreted the scene by the large gum tree to the right as a woman being beaten for intruding on an all-male ceremony.

== Provenance ==
The painting was presented to the State Library of New South Wales by Sir William Dixson in 1938. It was probably purchased by A. H. Spencer, Hill of Content Bookshop, from the Museum Book Store, London, on 19 August 1937, and then purchased by William Dixson in the same year.
