= Valentine Marshall =

Valentine Marshall (c. 1814 – 12 September 1887) was a British man who was tried and charged for his alleged involvement in the Nottingham Reform Bill riots.

Born Valentine Marshall in about 1814, he was the son of Rebecca and John Marshall. John was a framework knitter from Coal Pit Lane. Valentine was described as a farm labourer from Nottingham, five foot seven inches tall with a florid complexion, dark brown hair and dark grey eyes.

At the age of 17, Valentine Marshall was tried at Nottingham's Shire Hall for the offence of 'rioting and burning Colwick Hall' during the Nottingham Reform Bill riots of 1831. Several witnesses identified him as being part of the mob, but other witnesses said he was elsewhere at the time. He pleaded not guilty and denied the charge, stating that he was on Colwick Green when the incident took place. Marshall was found guilty and was sentenced to death by hanging; this was later commuted to transportation for life after a public outcry.

Valentine Marshall was briefly held at the County Gaol (jail) where his name can be seen, carved into the wall of the prison exercise yard. He was then taken to the hulk 'Justitia' at Woolwich, London, in February 1832. In March of the same year, he was moved with fifty other prisoners to the convict transport, the 'England'. Eventually it held two hundred male convicts including thirty boys from the 'Eurylus' boys hulk.

Valentine arrived at Hobart in Van Diemen's Land (Tasmania) on 19 July 1832. The journey had lasted 105 days – a relatively short time for the period as an average crossing lasted eight or nine months. Instead of being assigned to work for a free settler, once he arrived in Van Diemen's Land, Marshall was kept for public services. This meant that he was employed at Hobart Gaol as a messenger.

Valentine married a free woman, Letitia Riley, on 23 December 1834. He was later reprimanded on two occasions for disobedience and striking his wife. He received a ticket of leave on 22 June 1838 and a free pardon on 24 May 1842. This was reported in the 'Nottingham Review' and in the 'Illustrated London News' in February 1844. The Nottingham Review article went on to say that a letter has been received in Nottingham from Valentine, which said that he would be returning during the year. He never did. By then, he had three children and another four followed.

In December 1874, Letitia, Valentine's wife, died aged 52. Later he remarried a widowed dressmaker, Emma Palmer. He is at this time described as a gardener and seedsman. Marshall died from Bronchitis and paralysis, aged 73, on 12 September 1887.
