= Joseph Lycett =

Australian portrait and miniature painter

- Born: 1774; Staffordshire, England
- Died: 1828 (aged 53–54); Birmingham, England
- Occupations: Convict portrait and miniature painter
- Partner: Mary Stokes
- Children: Possibly 2 daughters

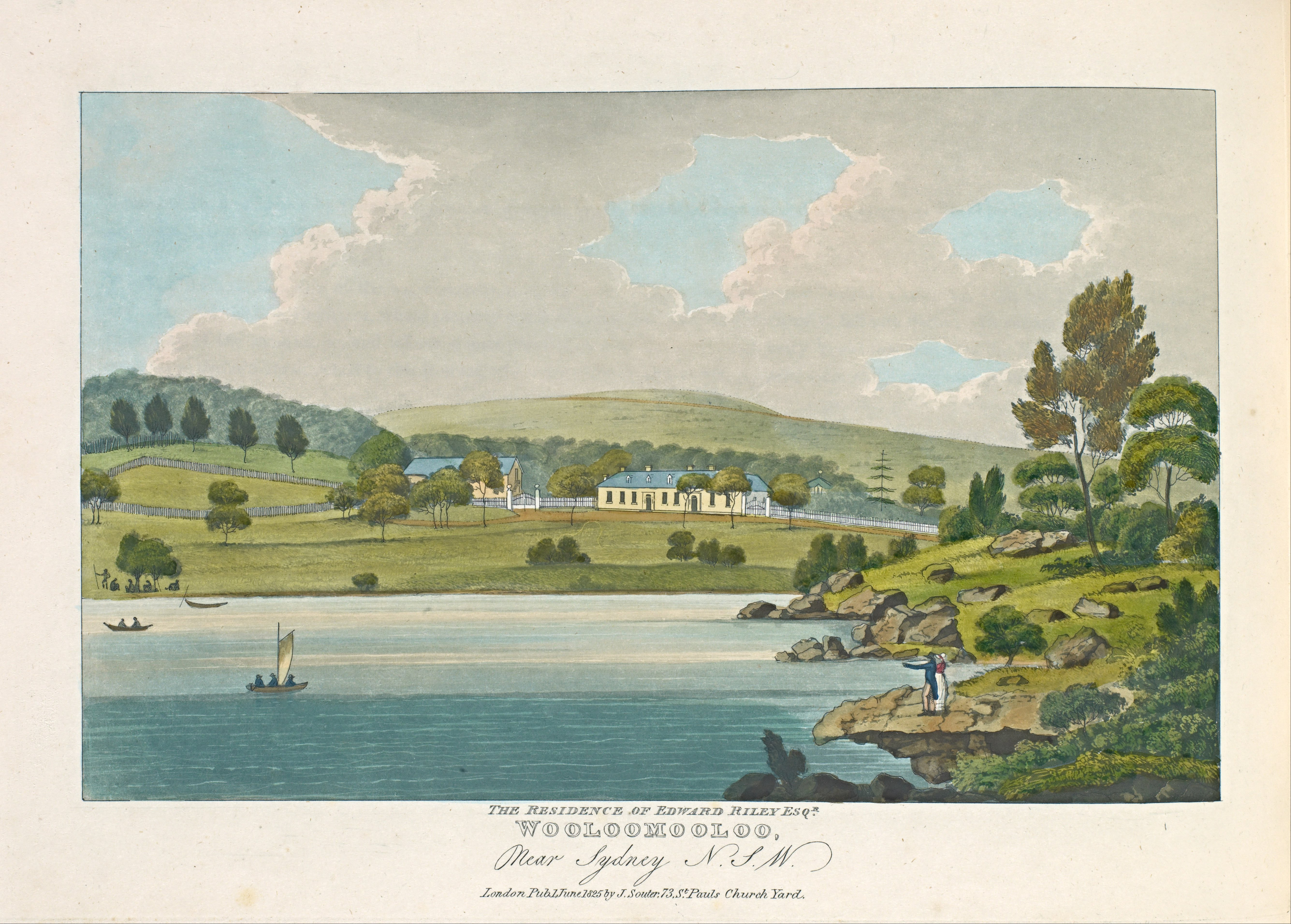
Joseph Lycett, The residence of Edward Riley Esquire, Wooloomooloo, Near Sydney N. S. W., 1825, hand-coloured aquatint and etching printed in dark blue ink. Australian print in the tradition of British decorative production.

Joseph Lycett (c.1774 – 1828) was a portrait and miniature painter, active in Australia. Transported to Australia for forging banknotes, Lycett found work in the colony as a painter specialised in topographical views of the major towns of Australia, and some of its more dramatic landscapes.

== Early life ==
Lycett was born in Staffordshire, England, where he became a botanical artist. By 1810, Lycett was described by others as an engraver and as a drawer; he was also noted as being a painter of portraits and miniatures. Lycett had a de facto wife, Mary Stokes, known as Mary Lycett.

== Convict years ==
=== Newcastle ===
Lycett was convicted of forgery on 10 August 1811, having been prosecuted by the injured party: the Bank of England. He was transported to Australia, sailing aboard the General Hewitt and arriving in Sydney on 7 February 1814. Lycett's first employment in Australia was as an artist for Absalom West and he reported in the October 1814 muster as a limner (painter). West left the colony in December 1814 and Lycett had to find a new position; by May 1815 Lycett was employed in the police office. At this time Sydney was flooded by hundreds of skilfully forged 5 shilling bills drawn on the postmaster. They were traced to Lycett, who was found in possession of a small copper-plate press. Lycett was sent to Newcastle on the Lady Nelson, where he came to the attention of the commandant of the settlement, Captain James Wallis. Lycett drew up the plans for a church which Wallis projected and, when it was built in 1818, he painted the altar piece; he is said to have also produced the three-light window which still survives in the bishop's vestry of Newcastle Cathedral. On the recommendation of the commandant, Captain James Wallis of the 46th Regiment, Lycett was given a conditional pardon. While there he also painted Corroboree at Newcastle, the first known oil painting to depict an Aboriginal corroboree at night. This painting has also been attributed to Wallis. Lycett painted at least 14 scenes depicting traditional cultural practices of the Awabakal people. The "Chief of the Newcastle tribe", Burigon, is shown in at least one of the works of the convict engraver, Walter (or William) Preston, which were based on Lycett’s drawings.

==== Collectors' Chests ====
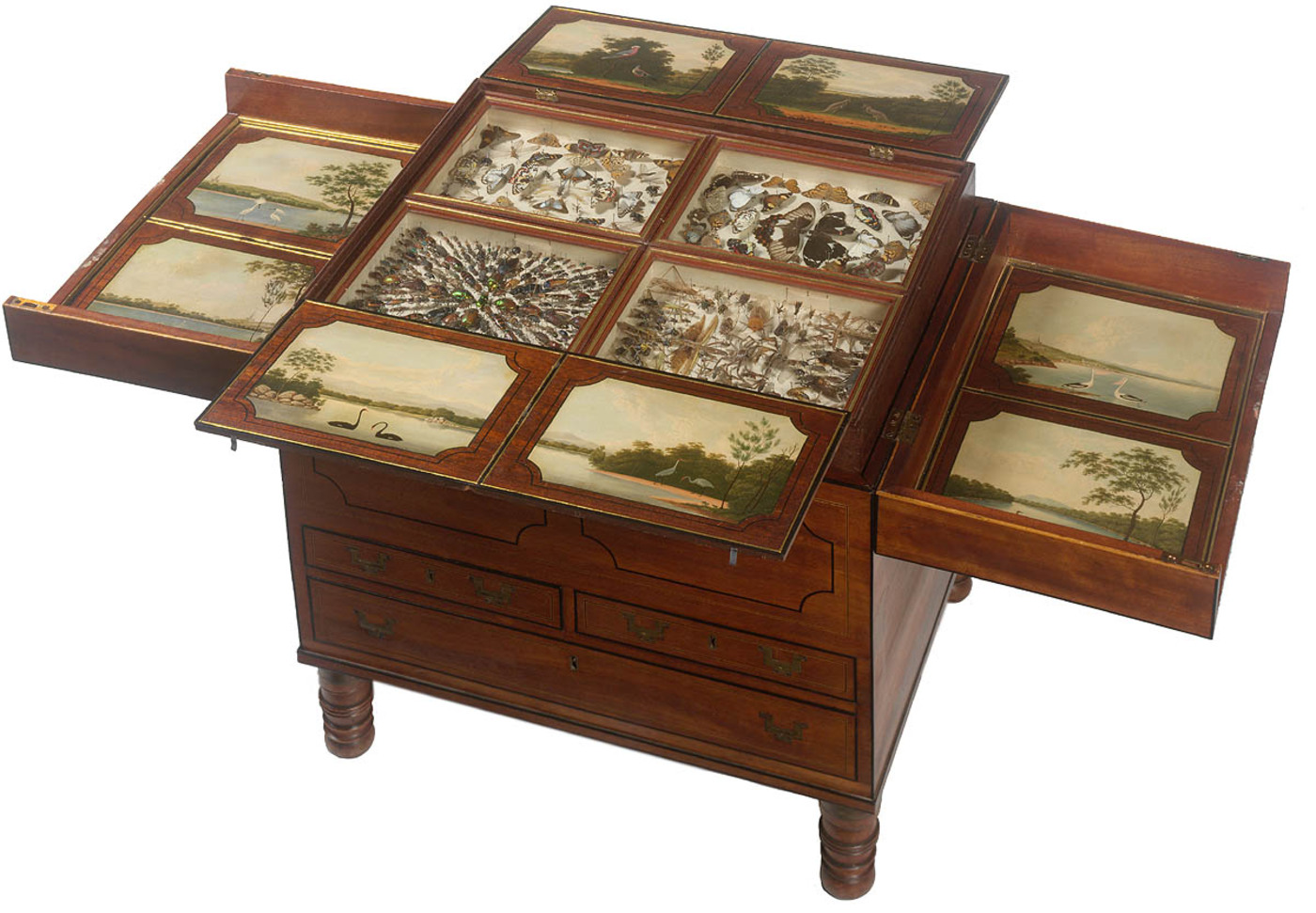
Collector's chest featuring Lycett's paintings. The chest is believed to have been presented to Lachlan Macquarie by Captain James Wallis, ca. 1818

Captain James Wallis also involved Lycett in the design of two cedar and rosewood timber chests displaying natural history specimens from the Newcastle area. Lycett was responsible for painting eight of the twelve panels on these chests which depict views of Newcastle as well as copies of William Westall's Views of Australian Scenery. It is strongly believed that Wallis presented one of these chests to Governor Lachlan Macquarie as a gift around the year of 1818. The other chest's initial provenance is unknown, but it was purchased by William Dixson in London in 1937 and later bequeathed to the State Library of New South Wales where Macquarie's chest is also held.

=== Sydney ===
Lycett returned to Sydney and was allowed to practice his art, and in 1820 Governor Macquarie sent three of his paintings including a large view of Sydney to Earl Bathurst. It is generally believed that the absolute pardon which Lycett received on 28 November 1821 was a reward for these pictures. Many of his patrons seem to have been drawn from the military and public service elite, and included Commissioner John Thomas Bigge (who described Lycett's "habits of intoxication" as "fixed and incurable"), his secretary Thomas Hobbes Scott, and Macquarie's aide-de-camp John Watts.

Lycett had possibly married in the colony, for on 21 June 1822 he advertised in The Sydney Gazette and New South Wales Advertiser that he intended to leave accompanied by his two daughters, Mary Ann and Emma. They sailed together in the Shipley on 8 September 1822.

=== Views in Australia ===
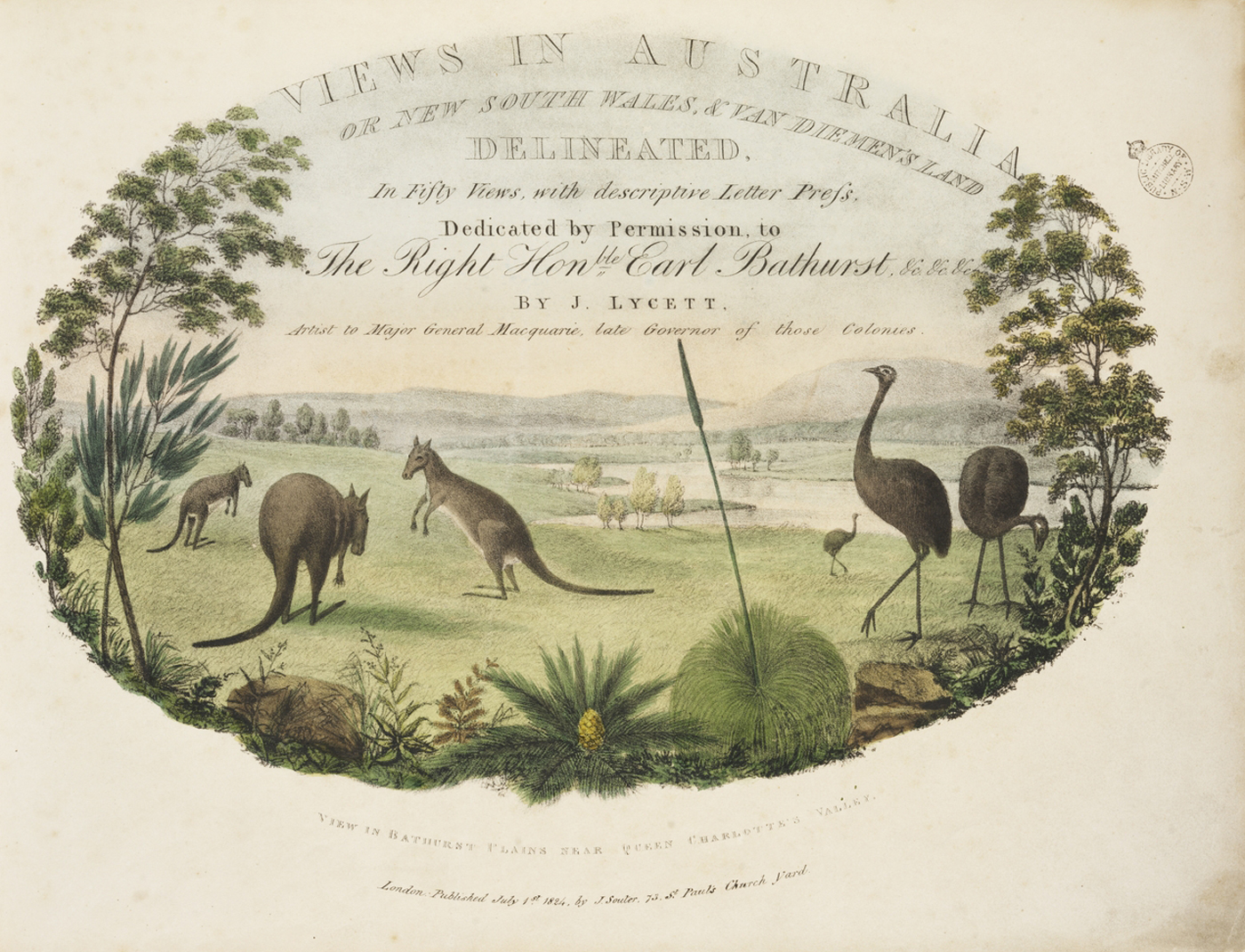
Lycett, J. (1824). Views in Australia, or, New South Wales & Van Diemen's Land delineated : In fifty views with descriptive letter press ... by J. Lycett. London, J. Souter., MRB/ F980.1/ L

Although his later publication Views in Australia suggests Lycett also visited Tasmania, there is no evidence of his actually travelling there. He returned to England in September 1822, having been granted an absolute pardon. With publisher John Souter, between July 1824 and June 1825 he issued Views in Australia, or New South Wales and Van Diemens Land in 13 parts published monthly, each with two aquatint views of New South Wales and two of Van Diemen's Land, with descriptive letterpress, and a supplement with maps of both colonies. By permission the series was dedicated to Bathurst. The parts began to appear in July 1824 at 7s. plain and 10s. 6d. coloured. With its complicated publishing history, the extent of Lycett's involvement in the entire production is unclear, and it does seem that the book was not successful. These views were reissued in a volume in 1825, that was reprinted in 1971. The 50 plates are coloured in some copies and plain in others.

== Death ==
The Warwick and Warwickshire Advertiser for Saturday 27 October 1827 (quoting from Aris's Birmingham Gazette) reported: FORGERY OF PROVINCIAL NOTES- On Saturday afternoon, the constables of Birmingham, accompanied by Mr Redfern, prison-keeper, proceeded to the house of an engraver named Joseph Lycett, in Bath Row, who was suspected of being implicated in the several forgeries of local bank notes which have lately appeared in that neighbourhood. After making some inquiry, the officer went upstairs, accompanied by Lycett, who, no doubt alarmed at the consequences likely to result, attempted self-destruction by cutting his throat on the stairs, and rushing into the chamber endeavoured to throw himself on the bed. He wounded himself severely near the jugular vein, and bled profusely. In the room was found a portable copper-plate press, with rolls, &c complete, a newly-engraved 1l plate of the Stourbridge and Bromsgrove Bank, with a facsimile of the signature, entry, number and date. He was immediately conveyed to Hospital, and there is every expectation that he will recover from the effects of the wound. His daughter, who was found with him in the house, is in custody, and the press, &c have been removed to the prison- Aris’s Birmingham Gazette.”

The Globe (quoting from the Hereford Journal) reported on 22 February 1828: “Joseph Lycett, who was apprehended in October is charged with having in his possession the plates from which forged one-pound notes of several country banks were struck off, died on Saturday at the General Hospital in Birmingham. It will be recollected that while the officers were searching his house, he took the opportunity of attempting self-destruction by cutting his throat; he was immediately removed to the Hospital, and placed under surgical care, and it was for some time considered that he would recover. The wound, subsequently, however, assumed an unfavourable appearance, he became gradually worse, and died on the day above-mentioned. He was a man of extraordinary ingenuity, and had his talent been better directed, he would have formed a valuable member of society. A coroner’s inquest was held before J.H. Wharnley, Esq, at the Warwick Arms, Snowhill, on Monday last, where after a long investigation, a verdict of “died a natural death” was returned. – Hereford Journal.

As above, Lycett died in Birmingham Hospital on 9 February 1828 and was buried in St Mary's Churchyard, Birmingham. A pencilled note in a copy of his Views in the State Library of New South Wales, states that, when he was living near Bath, he was again arrested for forgery of some notes on the Stourbridge Bank. On being arrested he cut his throat, and when recovering in hospital he tore open the wound and killed himself. However, this is not confirmed.

== See also ==
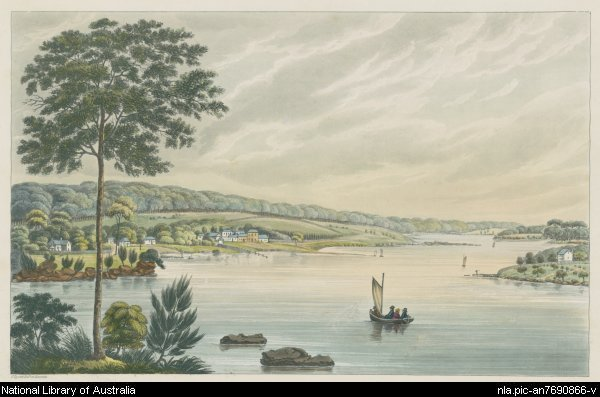
The property of the late Mr James Squires, Kissing Point, New South Wales. Creator Lycett, Joseph, ca. 1775-1828.

- List of convicts transported to Australia

== Sources ==
- Serle, Percival (1949). "Lycett, Joseph". Dictionary of Australian Biography. Sydney: Angus & Robertson.
- John McPhee ed., Joseph Lycett. Convict Artist, Historic Houses Trust of NSW, 2008.
