= Bushranger =

Australian outlaws active during the 19th century

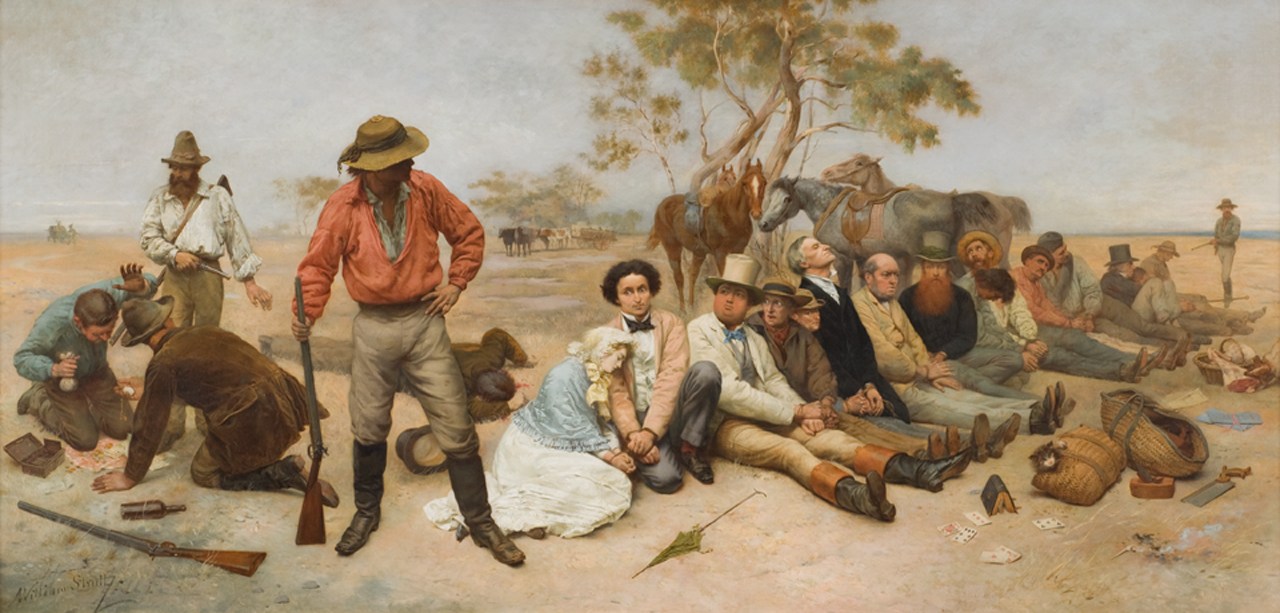
William Strutt's Bushrangers on the St Kilda Road, painted in 1887, depicts what Strutt described as "one of the most daring robberies attempted in Victoria" in 1852.

Bushrangers were armed robbers and outlaws who resided in the Australian bush between the 1780s and the early 20th century. The original use of the term dates back to the early years of the British colonisation of Australia, and applied to transported convicts who had escaped into the bush to hide from the authorities. By the 1820s, the term had evolved to refer to those who took up "robbery under arms" as a way of life, using the bush as their base.

Bushranging thrived during the mid-19th century gold rushes, with many bushrangers roaming the goldfields and country districts of New South Wales and Victoria, and to a lesser extent Queensland. As the outbreak worsened in the mid-1860s, colonial governments outlawed many of the most notorious bushrangers, including the Gardiner–Hall gang, Dan Morgan, and the Clarke gang. These "Wild Colonial Boys", mostly Australian-born sons of British and Irish convicts, were roughly analogous to highwaymen and outlaws of the American Old West, and their crimes included robbing small-town banks, bailing up coach services and raiding stations (pastoral estates). They also engaged in many shootouts with the police.

The number of bushrangers declined in the 1870s due to better policing and improvements in rail transport and communication technology, such as telegraphy. The last major phase of bushranging peaked towards the end of the decade, epitomised by the Kelly gang, led by Ned Kelly, Australia's best-known bushranger and outlaw. Although bushrangers appeared sporadically into the early 20th century, most historians regard Kelly's capture and execution in 1880 as effectively representing the end of the bushranging era.

Bushranging's origins in a convict system bred a unique kind of desperado, most frequently with an Irish political background. Native-born bushrangers also expressed nascent Australian nationalist views and have been described as "the first distinctively Australian characters to gain general recognition." As such, a number of bushrangers became folk heroes and symbols of rebellion, admired for their bravery, rough chivalry and colourful personalities. However, in stark contrast to romantic portrayals in the arts and popular culture, bushrangers often led lives that were "nasty, brutish and short", with some earning notoriety for their cruelty and bloodthirst. Australian attitudes toward bushrangers remain complex and ambivalent.

== Etymology ==
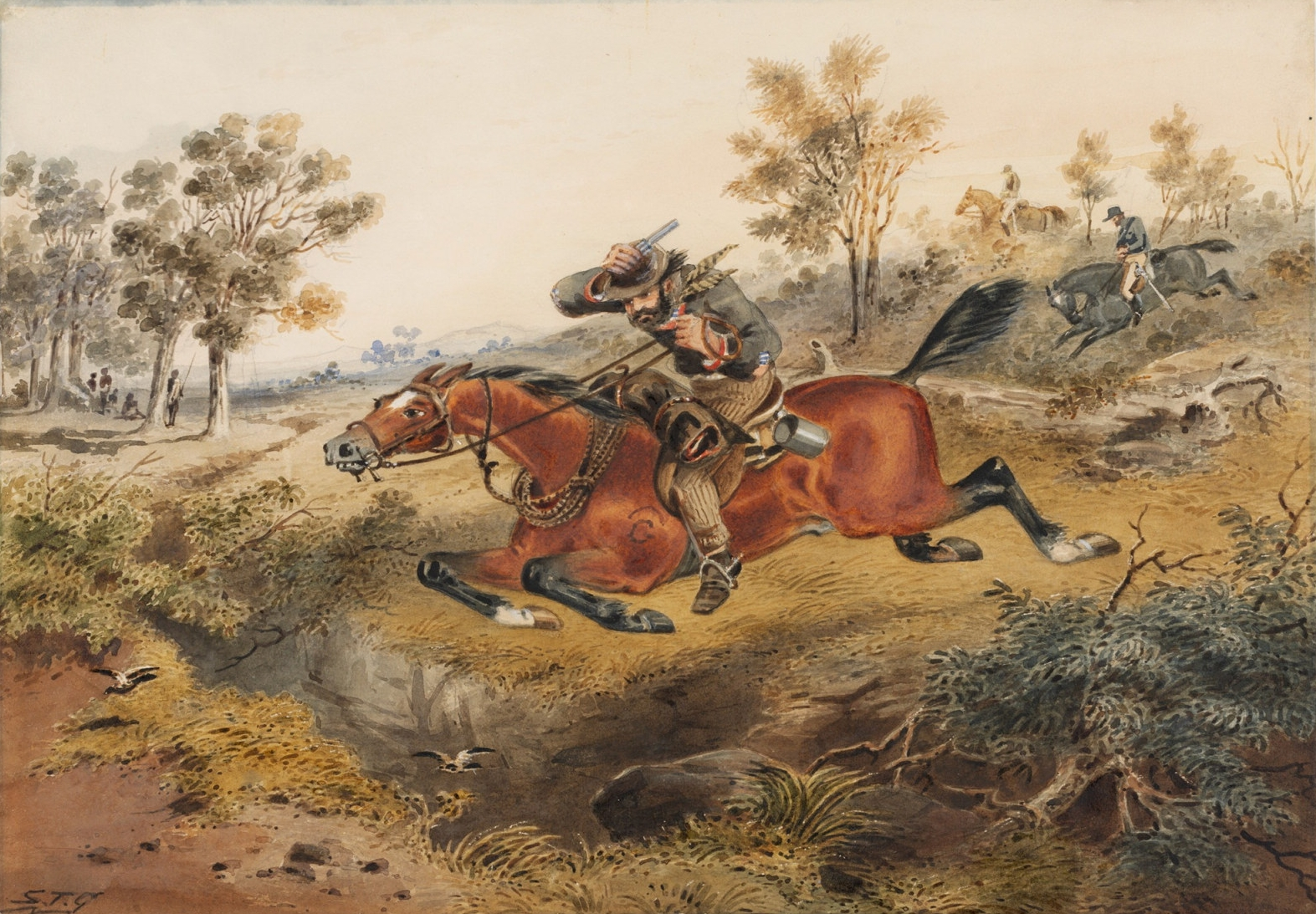
A bushranger on horseback being chased by the police in Hard-pressed (Flight of a Bushranger), painted by S. T. Gill, c. 1853

The earliest documented use of the term appears in a February 1805 issue of The Sydney Gazette, which reports that a cart had been stopped between Sydney and Hawkesbury by three men "whose appearance sanctioned the suspicion of their being bush-rangers". John Bigge described bushranging in 1821 as "absconding in the woods and living upon plunder and the robbery of orchards." Charles Darwin likewise recorded in 1835 that a bushranger was "an open villain who subsists by highway robbery, and will sooner be killed than taken alive".

== History ==
Over 2,000 bushrangers are estimated to have roamed the Australian countryside, beginning with the convict bolters and drawing to a close after Ned Kelly's last stand at Glenrowan.

=== Convict era (1780s–1840s) ===
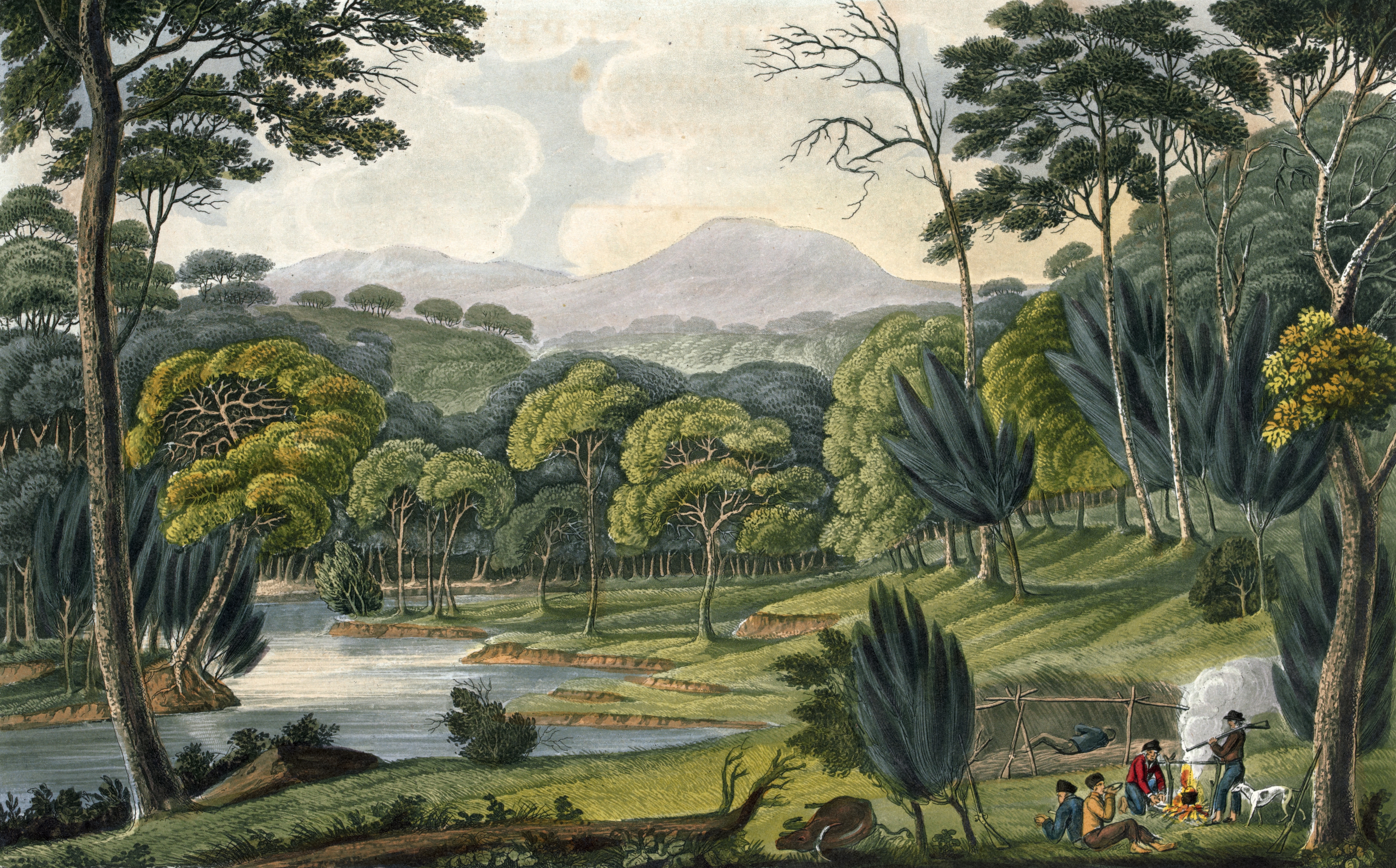
Convict artist Joseph Lycett's 1825 painting of the Nepean River shows a gang of bushrangers with guns.

Bushranging began soon after British settlement with the establishment of New South Wales as a penal colony in 1788. The majority of early bushrangers were convicts who had escaped prison, or from the properties of landowners to whom they had been assigned as servants. These bushrangers, also known as "bolters", preferred the hazards of wild, unexplored bushland surrounding Sydney to the deprivation and brutality of convict life. The first notable bushranger, African convict John Caesar, robbed settlers for food, and had a brief, tempestuous alliance with Aboriginal resistance fighters during Pemulwuy's War. While other bushrangers would go on to fight alongside Indigenous Australians in frontier conflicts with the colonial authorities, the Government tried to bring an end to any such collaboration by rewarding Aboriginal peoples for returning convicts to custody. Aboriginal trackers would play a significant role in the hunt for bushrangers.

Colonel Godfrey Mundy described convict bushrangers as "desperate, hopeless, fearless; rendered so, perhaps, by the tyranny of a gaoler, of an overseer, or of a master to whom he has been assigned." Edward Smith Hall, editor of early Sydney newspaper The Monitor, agreed that the convict system was a breeding-ground for bushrangers due to its savagery, with starvation and acts of torture being rampant. "Liberty or Death!" was the cry of convict bushrangers, and in large numbers they roamed beyond Sydney, some hoping to reach China, which was commonly believed to be connected by an overland route. Some bolters seized boats and set sail for foreign lands, but most were hunted down and brought back to Australia. Others attempted to inspire an overhaul of the convict system, or simply sought revenge on their captors. This latter desire found expression in the convict ballad "Jim Jones at Botany Bay", in which Jones, the narrator, plans to join bushranger Jack Donahue and "gun the floggers down".

Donahue was the most notorious of the early New South Wales bushrangers, terrorising settlements outside Sydney from 1827 until he was fatally shot by a trooper in 1830. That same year, west of the Blue Mountains, convict Ralph Entwistle sparked a bushranging insurgency known as the Bathurst Rebellion. He and his gang raided farms, liberating assigned convicts by force in the process, and within a month, his personal army numbered 80 men. Following gun battles with vigilante posses, mounted policemen and soldiers of the 39th and 57th Regiment of Foot, he and nine of his men were captured and executed.

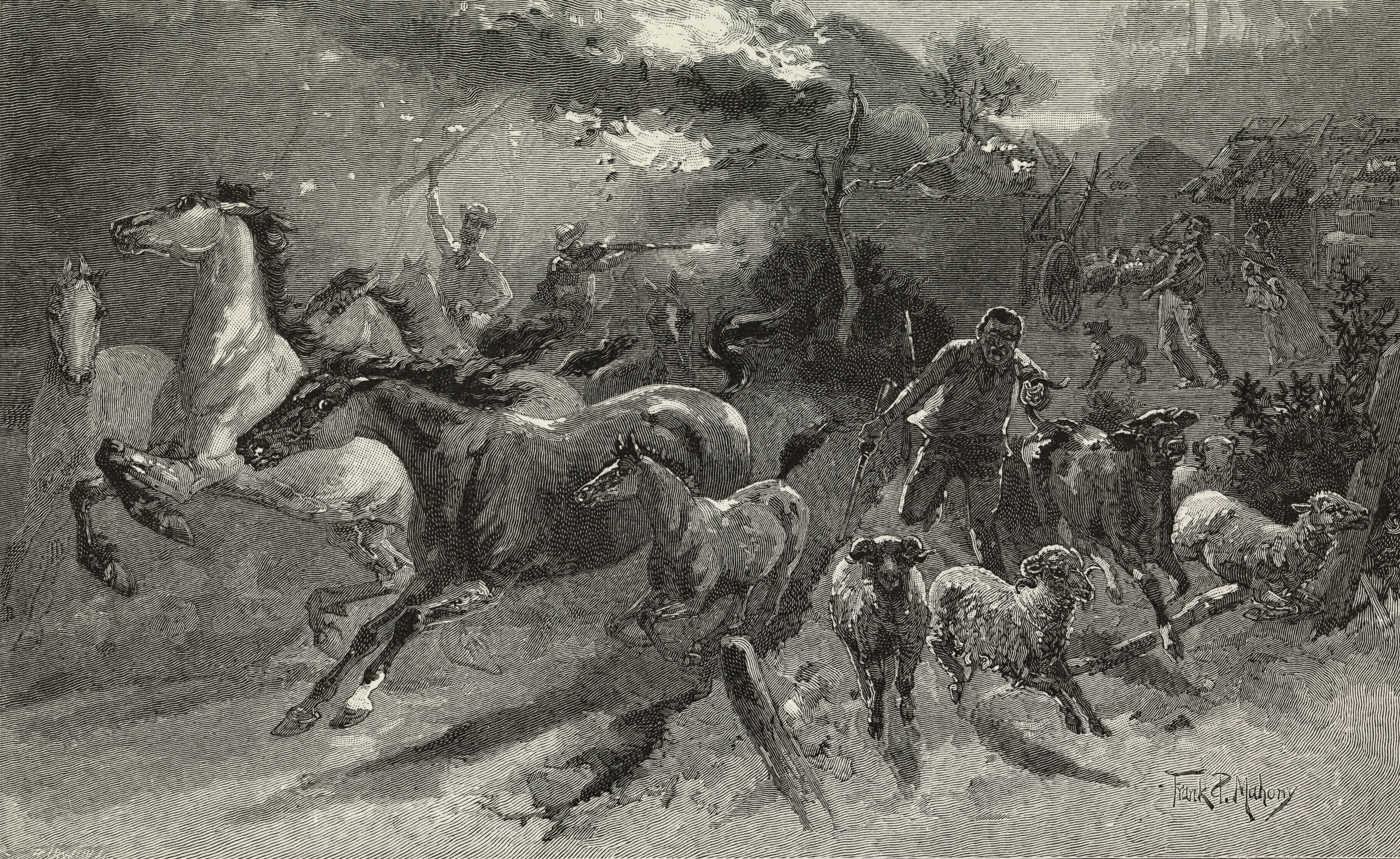
Vandemonian bushrangers plundering and burning a homestead

Convict bushrangers were particularly prevalent in the penal colony of Van Diemen's Land (now the state of Tasmania), established in 1803. The island's most powerful bushranger, the self-styled "Lieutenant Governor of the Woods", Michael Howe, led a gang of up to one hundred members "in what amounted to a civil war" with the colonial government. His control over large swathes of the island prompted elite squatters from Hobart and Launceston to collude with him, and for six months in 1815, Lieutenant-Governor Thomas Davey, fearing a convict uprising, declared martial law in an effort to suppress Howe's influence. Most of the gang had either been captured or killed by 1818, the year Howe was clubbed to death by a soldier. Vandemonian bushranging peaked in the 1820s with hundreds of bolters at large, among the most notorious being Matthew Brady's gang, cannibal serial killers Alexander Pearce and Thomas Jeffrey, and tracker-turned-resistance leader Musquito. Jackey Jackey (alias of William Westwood) was sent from New South Wales to Van Diemen's Land in 1842 after attempting to escape Cockatoo Island. In 1843, he escaped Port Arthur, and took up bushranging in Tasmania's mountains, but was recaptured and sent to Norfolk Island, where, as leader of the 1846 Cooking Pot Uprising, he murdered three constables, and was hanged along with sixteen of his men.

The era of convict bushrangers gradually faded with the decline in penal transportations to Australia in the 1840s. It had ceased by the 1850s to all colonies except Western Australia, which accepted convicts between 1850 and 1868. The best-known convict bushranger of the colony was the prolific escapee Moondyne Joe.

=== Gold rush era (1850s–1860s) ===
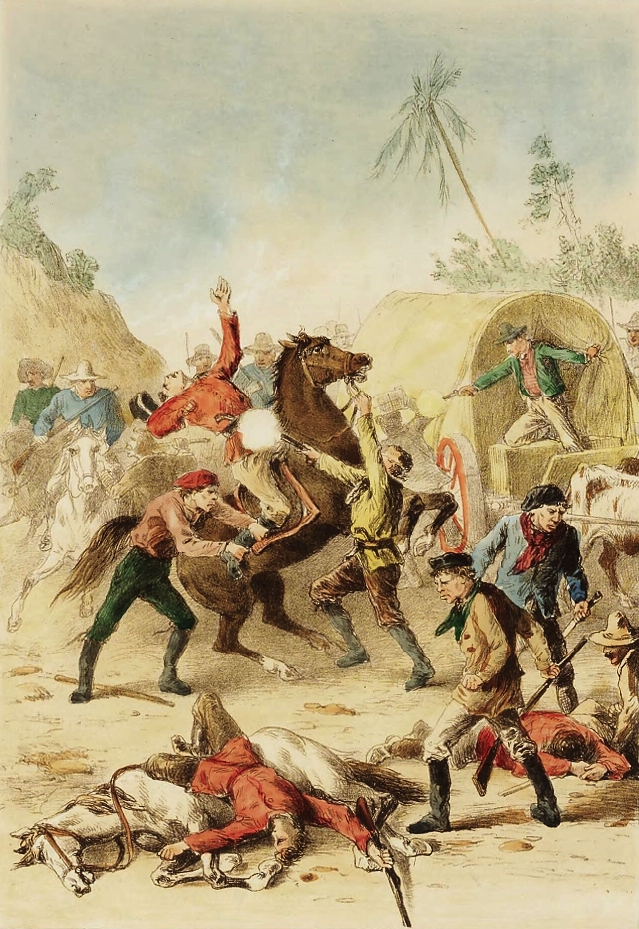
Bushrangers attack mounted policemen guarding a gold escort

The Australian gold rushes of the 1850s and 1860s marked the next distinct phase of bushranging, as the discovery of gold gave bushrangers access to great wealth that was portable and easily converted to cash. Their task was assisted by the isolated location of the goldfields and the decimation of the police force with many troopers abandoning their duties to join the gold rush.

In Victoria, several major gold robberies occurred in 1852–53. Three bushrangers, including George Melville, were hanged in front of a large crowd for their role in the 1853 McIvor Escort Robbery near Castlemaine. Bushranging numbers also flourished in New South Wales with the rise of the colonial-born sons of poor ex-convicts who were drawn to a more glamorous life than mining or farming. Much of the activity in the colony was in the Lachlan Valley, around Forbes, Yass and Cowra.

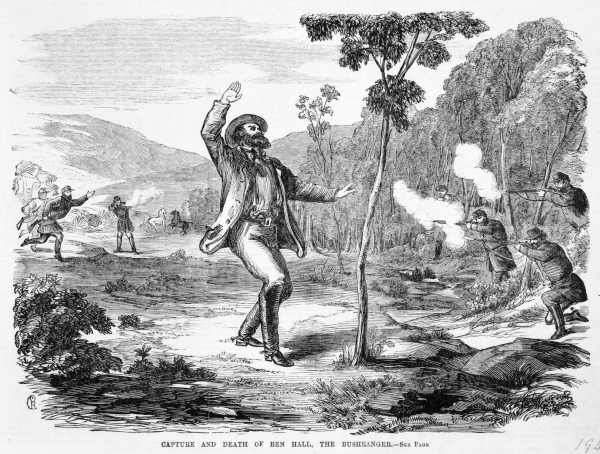
Ben Hall ambushed and shot dead by eight troopers, 1865

The Gardiner–Hall gang, led by Frank Gardiner and Ben Hall and counting John Dunn, John Gilbert and Fred Lowry among its members, was responsible for some of the most daring robberies of the 1860s, including the 1862 Escort Rock robbery, Australia's largest ever gold heist. The gang also engaged in many shootouts with the police, resulting in deaths on both sides. Other bushrangers active in New South Wales during this period, such as Dan Morgan, and the Clarke brothers and their associates, murdered multiple policemen.

As bushranging continued to escalate in the 1860s, the Parliament of New South Wales passed a bill, the Felons Apprehension Act 1865, that effectively allowed anyone to shoot outlawed bushrangers on sight. By the time the Clarke brothers were captured and hanged in 1867, organised gang bushranging in New South Wales had effectively ceased.

Captain Thunderbolt (alias of Frederick Ward) robbed inns and mail-coaches across northern New South Wales for six and a half years, one of the longest careers of any bushranger. He sometimes operated alone; at other times, he led gangs, and was accompanied by his Aboriginal 'wife', Mary Ann Bugg, who is credited with helping extend his career.

=== Decline and the Kelly gang (1870s–1880s) ===
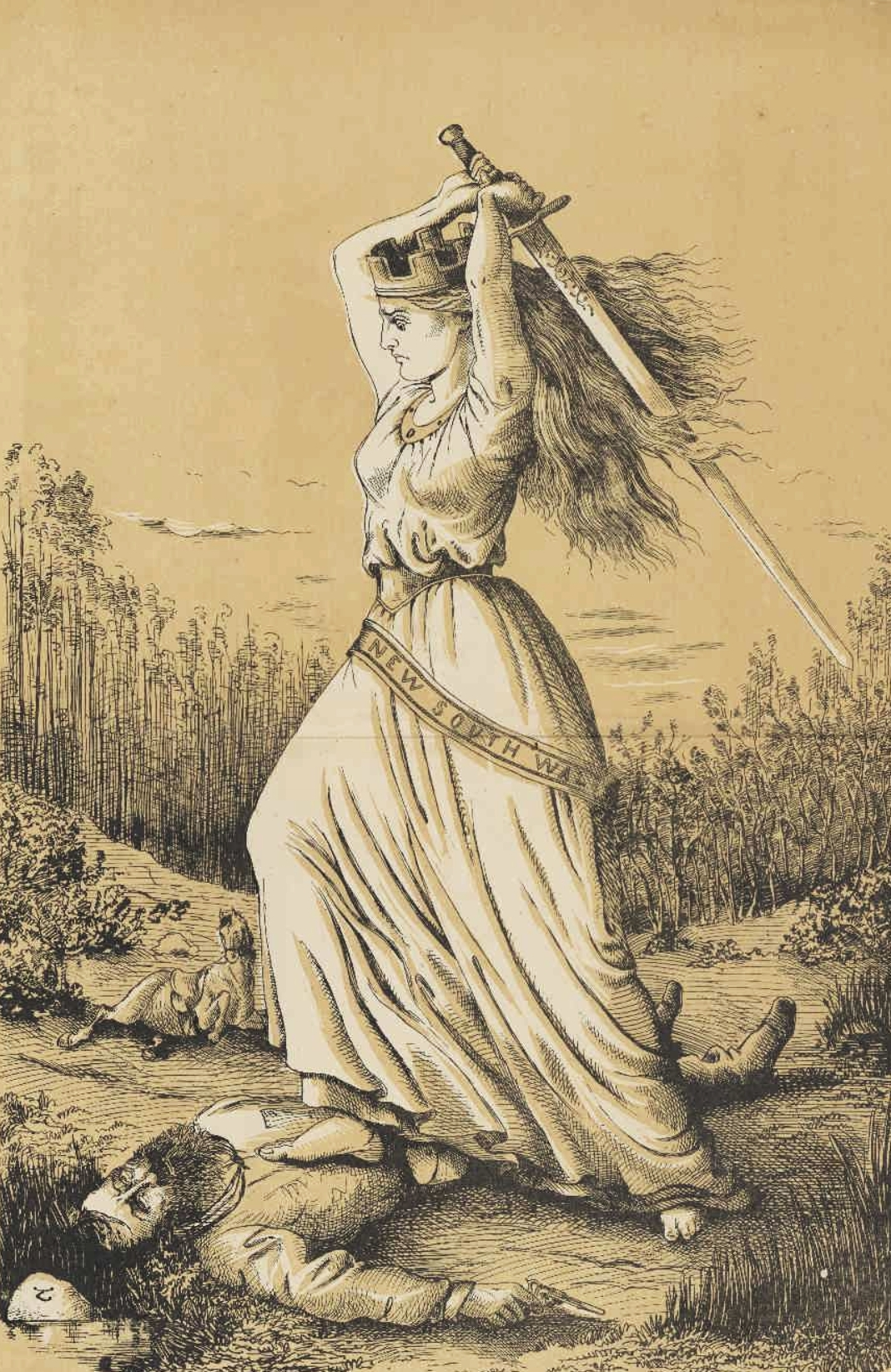
An 1870 cartoon shows a personification of New South Wales slaying "the last of the bushrangers"

The increasing push of settlement, increased police efficiency, improvements in rail transport and communications technology, such as telegraphy, made it more difficult for bushrangers to evade capture. In 1870, Captain Thunderbolt was fatally shot by a policeman, and with his death, the New South Wales bushranging epidemic that began in the early 1860s came to an end.

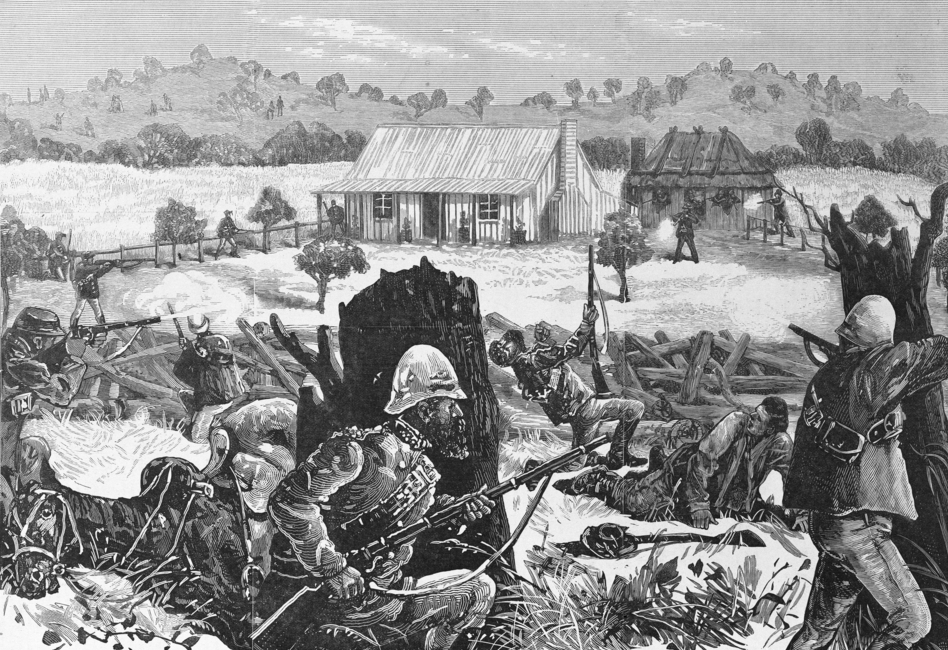
Watched by hundreds of onlookers in the surrounding hills, troopers and Captain Moonlite's gang engage in a gunfight in 1879.

The scholarly, but eccentric Captain Moonlite (alias of Andrew George Scott) worked as an Anglican lay reader before turning to bushranging. Imprisoned in Ballarat for an armed bank robbery on the Victorian goldfields, he escaped, but was soon recaptured and received a ten-year sentence in HM Prison Pentridge. Within a year of his release in 1879, he and his gang held up the town of Wantabadgery in the Riverina. Two of the gang (including Moonlite's "soulmate" and alleged lover, James Nesbitt) and one trooper were killed when the police attacked. Scott was found guilty of murder and hanged along with one of his accomplices on 20 January 1880.

Among the last bushrangers was the Kelly gang in Victoria, led by Ned Kelly, Australia's most famous bushranger. After murdering three policemen in a shootout in 1878, the gang was outlawed, and after raiding towns and robbing banks into 1879, earned the distinction of having the largest reward ever placed on the heads of bushrangers. In 1880, after failing to derail and ambush a police train, the gang, clad in bulletproof armour they had devised, engaged in a shootout with the police. Ned Kelly, the only gang member to survive, was hanged at the Melbourne Gaol on 11 November 1880.

=== Isolated outbreaks (1890s–1900s) ===
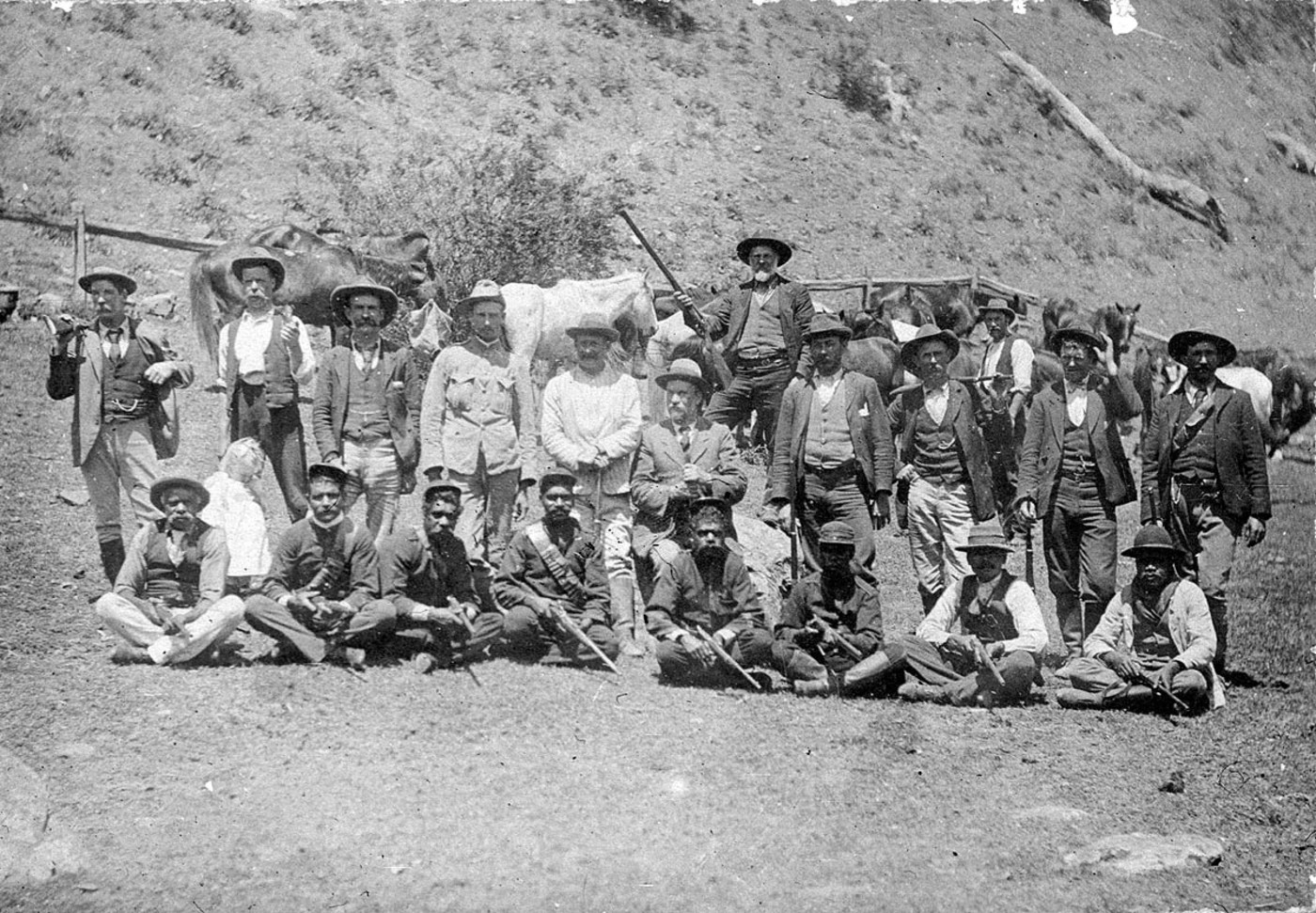
A posse of mounted troopers, native police and volunteers searching for the Governor gang, 1900

Bushranging was largely considered a bygone era by the 1890s. There were however a few major cases from this point on, including the Governor gang—a trio consisting of Aboriginal fencing contractor Jimmy Governor, his brother Joe Governor, and associate Jack Underwood. In July 1900 they perpetrated the Breelong Massacre, killing four members of the Mawbey family and a schoolteacher. The Governor brothers proceeded to engage in a crime spree across northern New South Wales, murdering an additional four people and triggering one of the largest manhunts in Australian history. After three months, Jimmy was arrested by a group of armed locals in Bobin, and his brother Joe was fatally shot near Singleton a few days later. Jack Underwood (who had been caught shortly after the Breelong Massacre) was hanged in Dubbo Gaol on 14 January 1901, and Jimmy Governor was hanged in Darlinghurst Gaol on 18 January 1901.

The Kenniff brothers, Patrick and James, were notorious stock thieves who operated in western Queensland. In March 1902, they murdered constables George Doyle and Albert Dahlke, who were sent to apprehend them. Three months later, the brothers were captured on 23 June at now-named Arrest Creek. Both brothers were convicted of murder, with Patrick sentenced to hang, and James initially sentenced to death, but his sentence was commuted to life imprisonment.

=== "Boy bushrangers" (1910s–1920s) ===
The final phase of bushranging was sustained by the so-called "boy bushrangers"—youths who sought to commit crimes, mostly armed robberies, modelled on the exploits of their bushranging "heroes". The majority were captured alive; a few died in shootouts with the police.

== Women bushrangers ==
While women bushrangers were not as widely known as men, a number of women bushrangers were reported on in the newspapers. These include:

Mrs Winter, a bushranger in early nineteenth-century New South Wales, was briefly associated with John Tennant.

Sarah Webb, arrested with her husband William for bushranging in 1826.

Mary Williams, a known Tasmanian bushranger. There is a passing mention of her in a court case article from 1833.

Mary Ann Bugg (7 May 1834 – 22 April 1905) was a Worimi bushranger in mid nineteenth century New South Wales who was Captain Thunderbolt's partner.

Bet Neen, a notorious female bushranger in New South Wales, associated with a man named Hunt.

Kitty Morgan, touted as "one of the most notorious and wicked females that ever lived", was active in the mid-19th century around Victoria. She was accused of affairs, murder, robbery and bushranging and was shot and killed by a shepherd as she entered his hut in disguise.

Jessie Hickman (née Hunt; 6 September 1890 – 1936) was an Australian bushranger. She had multiple aliases but is often referred to as The Lady Bushranger. In the 1920s she established herself as leader of a gang of cattle thieves in the area that is now Wollemi National Park.

== Public perception ==
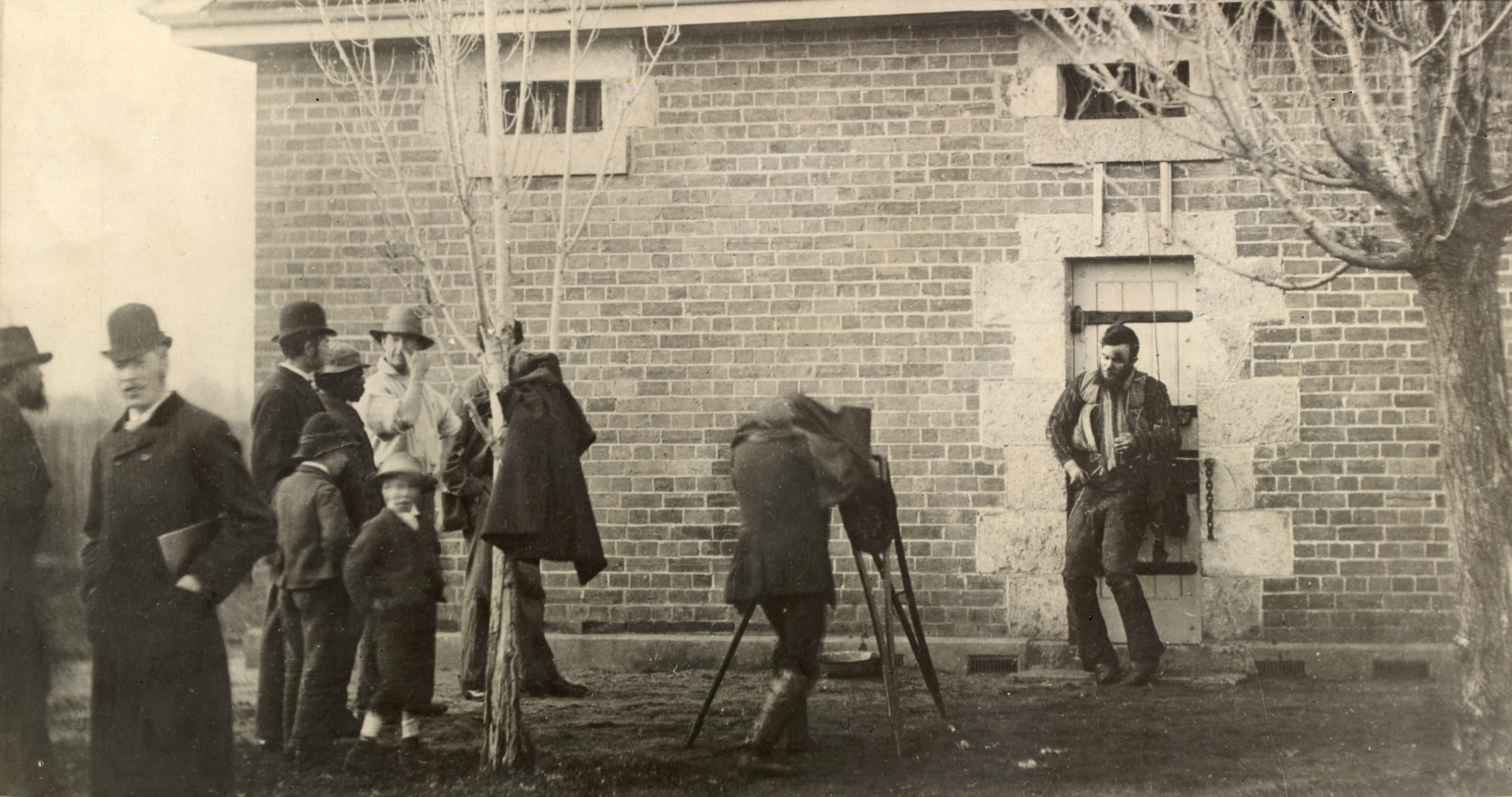
The body of Joe Byrne, strung up as a curiosity in Benalla, 1880. Photograph by John William Lindt.

In Australia, bushrangers often attract public sympathy (cf. the concept of social bandits). In Australian history and iconography bushrangers are held in some esteem in some quarters due to the harshness and anti-Catholicism of the colonial authorities whom they embarrassed, and the romanticism of the lawlessness they represented. Some bushrangers, most notably Ned Kelly in his Jerilderie letter, and in his final raid on Glenrowan, explicitly represented themselves as political rebels. Attitudes to Kelly, by far the most well-known bushranger, exemplify the ambivalent views of Australians regarding bushranging.

== Legacy ==
The impact of bushrangers upon the areas in which they roamed is evidenced in the names of many geographical features in Australia, including Brady's Lookout, Moondyne Cave, the township of Codrington, Mount Tennent, Thunderbolts Way and Ward's Mistake. The districts of North East Victoria are unofficially known as Kelly Country.

Some bushrangers made a mark on Australian literature. While running from soldiers in 1818, Michael Howe dropped a knapsack containing a self-made book of kangaroo skin and written in kangaroo blood. In it was a dream diary and plans for a settlement he intended to found in the bush. Sometime bushranger Francis MacNamara, also known as Frank the Poet, wrote some of the best-known poems of the convict era. Several convict bushrangers also wrote autobiographies, including Jackey Jackey, Martin Cash and Owen Suffolk.

=== Cultural depictions ===
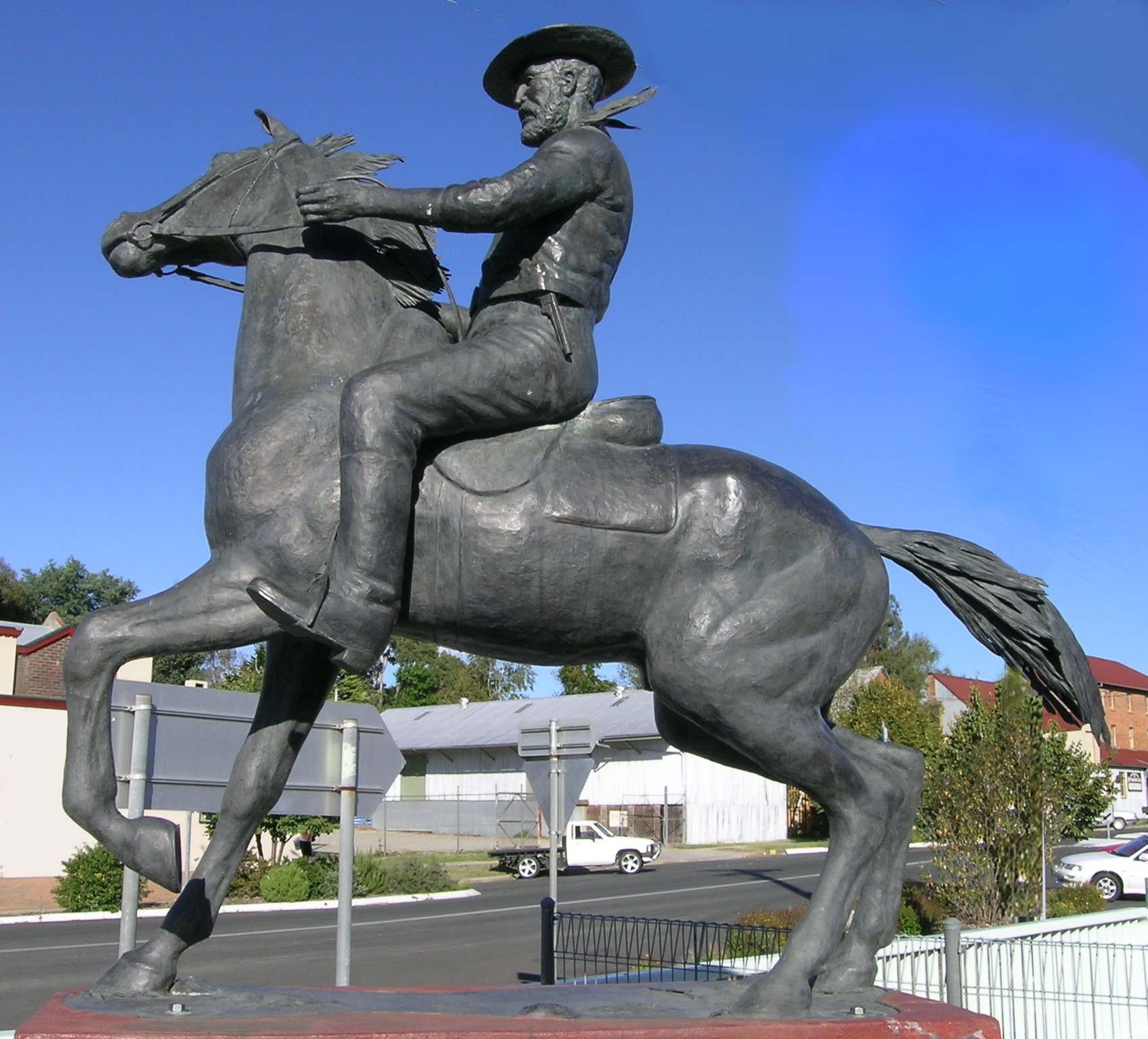
A statue of Captain Thunderbolt, Uralla, New South Wales

Jack Donahue was the first bushranger to have inspired bush ballads, including "Bold Jack Donahue" and "The Wild Colonial Boy". Ben Hall and his gang were the subject of several bush ballads, including "Streets of Forbes".

Michael Howe inspired the earliest play set in Tasmania, Michael Howe, The Terror of Van Diemen's Land, which premiered at The Old Vic in London in 1821. Other early plays about bushrangers include David Burn's The Bushrangers (1829), William Leman Rede's Faith and Falsehood; or, The Fate of the Bushranger (1830), William Thomas Moncrieff's Van Diemen's Land: An Operatic Drama (1831), The Bushrangers; or, Norwood Vale (1834) by Henry Melville, and The Bushrangers; or, The Tregedy of Donohoe (1835) by Charles Harpur.

In the late 19th century, E. W. Hornung and Hume Nisbet created popular bushranger novels within the conventions of the European "noble bandit" tradition. First serialised in The Sydney Mail in 1882–83, Rolf Boldrewood's bushranging novel Robbery Under Arms is considered a classic of Australian colonial literature. It also cited as an important influence on the American writer Owen Wister's 1902 novel The Virginian, widely regarded as the first Western.

Bushrangers were a favoured subject of colonial artists such as S. T. Gill, Frank P. Mahony and William Strutt. Tom Roberts, one of the leading figures of the Heidelberg School (also known as Australian Impressionism), depicted bushrangers in some of his history paintings, including In a corner on the Macintyre (1894) and Bailed Up (1895), both set in Inverell, the area where Captain Thunderbolt was once active.

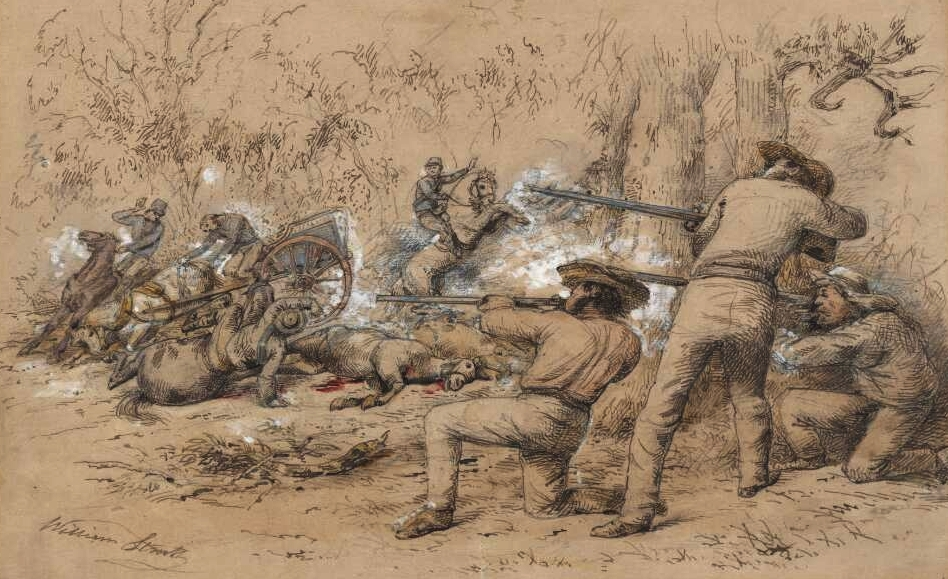
William Strutt, A bush hold-up, 1855

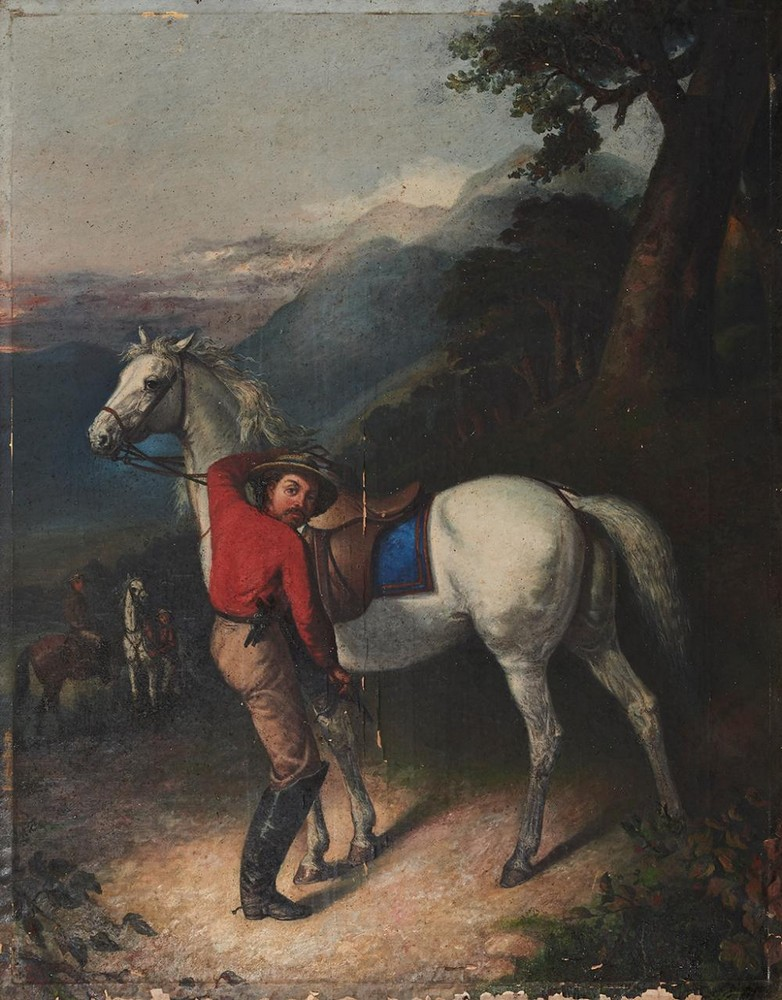
William Reay's portrait of Frank Gardiner, 1867

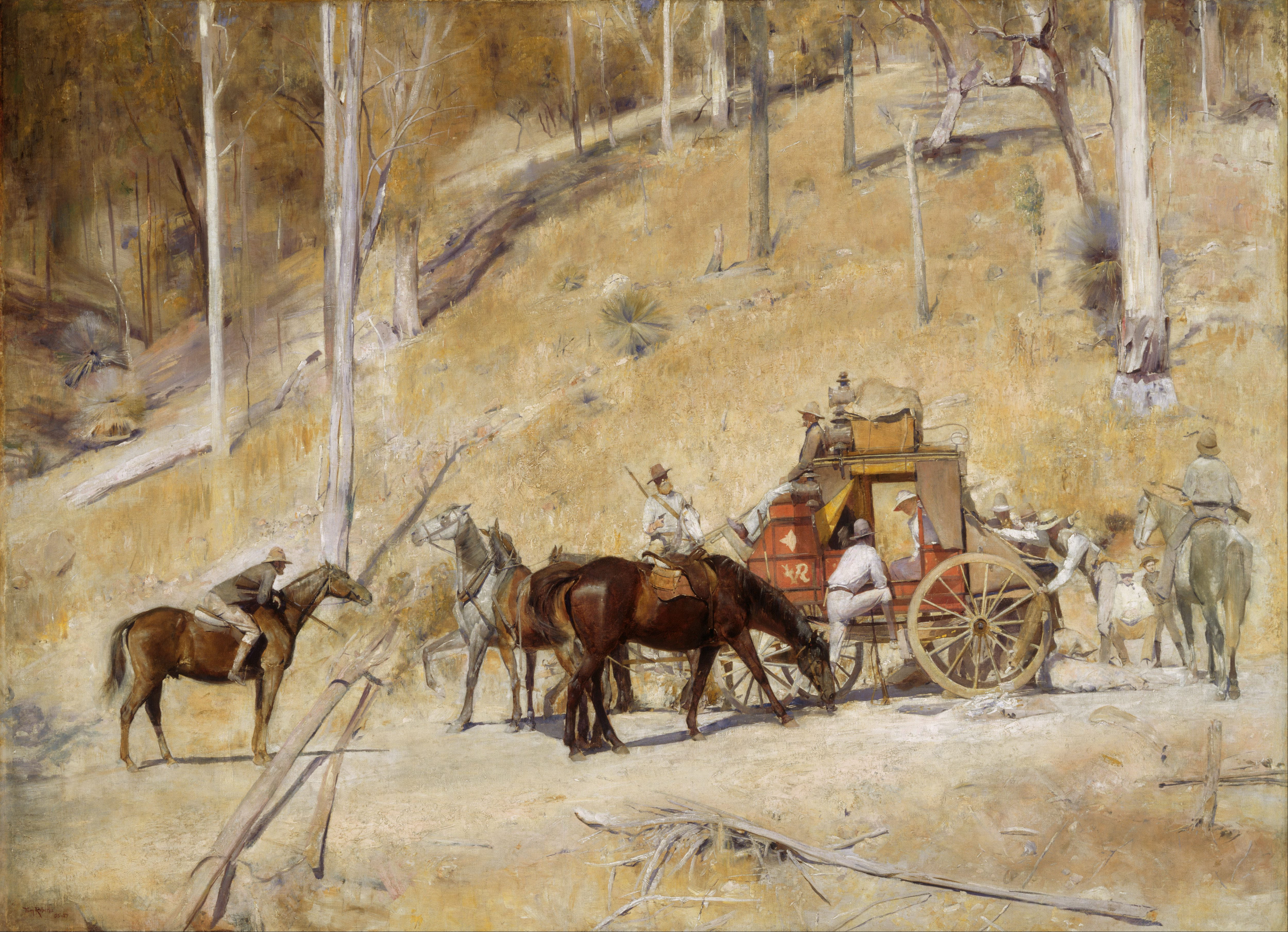
Tom Roberts' 1895 painting Bailed Up depicts a Cobb & Co hold up from the 1860s

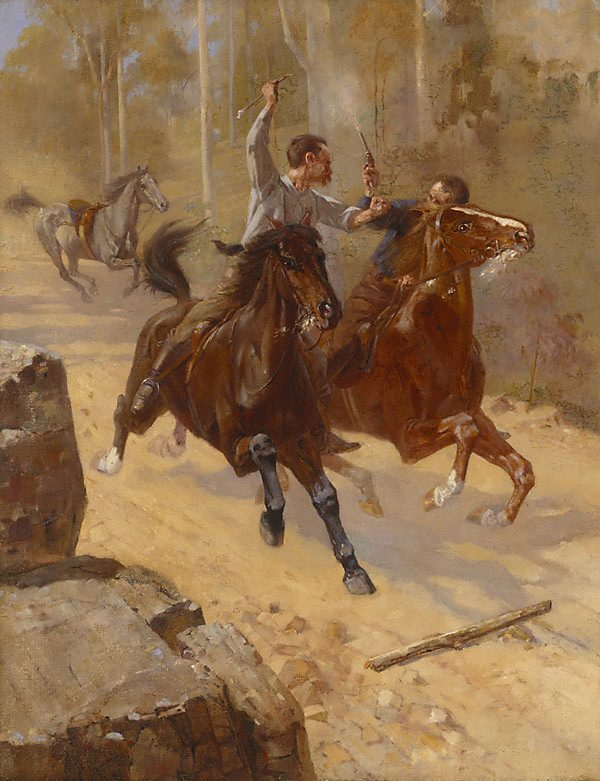
Frank P. Mahony, As in the days of old, 1892

==== Film ====
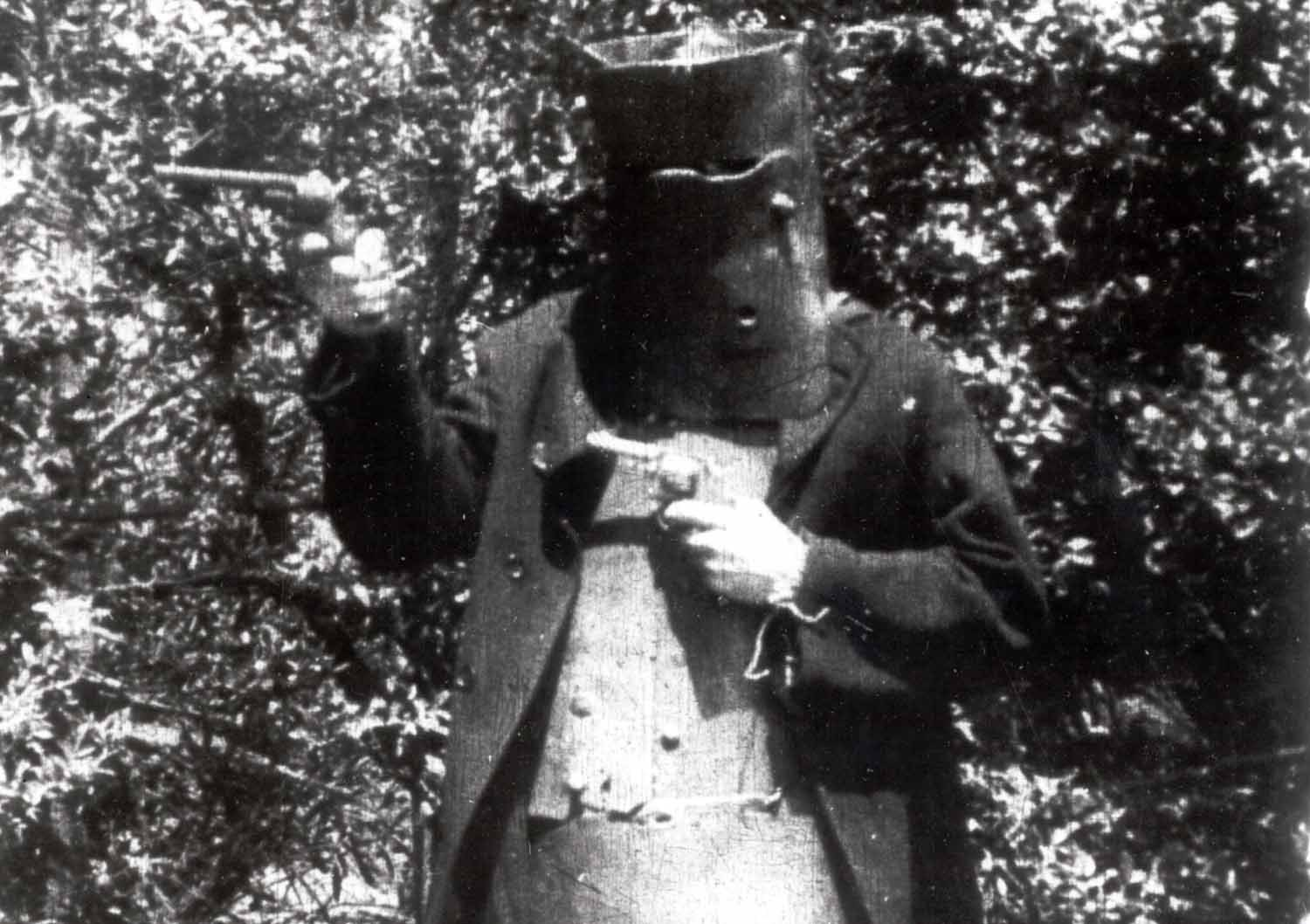
Actor playing Ned Kelly in The Story of the Kelly Gang (1906), the world's first feature-length narrative film

Although not the first Australian film with a bushranging theme, The Story of the Kelly Gang (1906)—the world's first feature-length narrative film—is regarded as having set the template for the genre. On the back of the film's success, its producers released one of two 1907 film adaptations of Boldrewood's Robbery Under Arms (the other being Charles MacMahon's version). Entering the first "golden age" of Australian cinema (1910–12), director John Gavin released two fictionalised accounts of real-life bushrangers: Moonlite (1910) and Thunderbolt (1910). The genre's popularity with audiences led to a spike of production unprecedented in world cinema. Dan Morgan (1911) is notable for portraying its title character as an insane villain rather than a figure of romance. Ben Hall, Frank Gardiner, Captain Starlight, and numerous other bushrangers also received cinematic treatments at this time.

Alarmed by what they saw as the glorification of outlawry, state governments imposed a ban on bushranger films in 1912, effectively removing "the entire folklore relating to bushrangers ... from the most popular form of cultural expression." It is seen as a major reason for the collapse of a booming Australian film industry. One of the few Australian films to escape the ban before it was lifted in the 1940s is the 1920 adaptation of Robbery Under Arms. Also during this lull appeared American takes on the bushranger genre, including The Bushranger (1928), Stingaree (1934) and Captain Fury (1939).

Ned Kelly (1970) starred Mick Jagger in the title role. Dennis Hopper portrayed Dan Morgan in Mad Dog Morgan (1976). More recent bushranger films include Ned Kelly (2003), starring Heath Ledger, The Proposition (2005), written by Nick Cave, The Outlaw Michael Howe (2013), and The Legend of Ben Hall (2016).

== Notable bushrangers ==
Name	Lived	Area of activity	Fate	Portrait
The Angel (alias of Thomas Hobson)	c. 1858–1885	Northern New South Wales	Shot by police	
The Barber (alias of George Clarke)	1806–1835	Liverpool Plains in New South Wales	Hanged	
Bluecap (alias of Robert Cotterell)	c. 1835–?	New South Wales	Imprisoned, cause of death unknown	
Matthew Brady	1799–1826	Van Diemen's Land	Hanged	
Edward Broughton	1803–1831	Van Diemen's Land	Hanged	
Mary Ann Bugg	1834–1905	Northern New South Wales	Died of old age	
Richard Burgess	1829–1866	New South Wales; Victoria	Hanged	
Michael Burke	1843–1863	New South Wales	Shot	
Joe Byrne	1857–1880	North East Victoria	Shot by police	
John Caesar	1764–1796	Sydney area	Shot	
Johnny Campbell	c. 1846–1880	South East Queensland	Hanged	
Captain Melville (alias of Frank McCallum)	c. 1823–1857	Goldfields region of Victoria	Suicide	
Captain Moonlite (alias of Andrew George Scott)	1842–1880	Victoria; New South Wales	Hanged	
Captain Starlight (alias of Frank Pearson)	1837–1889	New South Wales; Queensland	Imprisoned, died a free man	
Captain Thunderbolt (alias of Frederick Ward)	1835–1870	New South Wales	Shot by police	
Martin Cash	c. 1808–1877	Van Diemen's Land	Imprisoned, died a free man	
Clarke brothers	1840/1846–1867	New South Wales	Hanged	
Patrick Connell	1835–1866	New South Wales	Shot by police	
Frederick Cranley	c. 1847–1877	New South Wales	Shot by police	
Patrick Daley	1844–?	New South Wales	Imprisoned, died a free man	
Edward Davis	?–1841	Northern New South Wales	Hanged	
Jack Donahue	c. 1806–1830	Sydney area	Shot by police	
John Dunn	1846–1866	Western New South Wales	Hanged	
Ralph Entwistle	c. 1805–1830	New South Wales	Hanged	
Joe Flick	c.1865–1889	Gulf Country of Queensland	Shot by police	
John Francis	c. 1825–?	Goldfields region of Victoria	Imprisoned, cause of death unknown	
Frank Gardiner	c. 1829–c. 1882	Western New South Wales	Imprisoned, died a free man	
John Gilbert	1842–1865	Western New South Wales	Shot by police	
Jimmy Governor	1875–1901	New South Wales	Hanged	
Ben Hall	1837–1865	Western New South Wales	Shot by police	
Steve Hart	1859–1880	North East Victoria	Possible suicide	
Michael Howe	1787–1818	Van Diemen's Land	Shot by police	
Jack the Rammer (alias of William Roberts)	?–1834	South Eastern New South Wales	Shot	
Thomas Jeffrey	1791–1826	Van Diemen's Land	Hanged	
George Jones	c. 1815–1844	Van Diemen's Land	Hanged	
Lawrence Kavenagh	c. 1805–1846	Van Diemen's Land	Hanged	
Dan Kelly	c. 1861–1880	North East Victoria	Possible suicide	
Ned Kelly	c. 1854–1880	North East Victoria	Hanged	
Patrick Kenniff	1865–1903	Queensland	Hanged	
John Kerney	c. 1844–1892	South Australia	Imprisoned, died a free man	
Fred Lowry	1836–1863	New South Wales	Shot by police	
John Lynch	1813–1842	New South Wales	Hanged	
James McPherson	1842–1895	Queensland	Imprisoned, died a free man	
Major the Outlaw	c. late 1880s - 1908	Western Australia	Shot by police	
Henry Manns	1839–1863	New South Wales	Hanged	
Midnight (alias of Thomas Law)	c. 1850–1878	New South Wales; Queensland	Shot by police	
Moondyne Joe (alias of Joseph Johns)	c. 1828–1900	Western Australia	Imprisoned, died a free man	
Dan Morgan	c. 1830–1865	New South Wales	Shot by police	
Musquito	c. 1780–1825	Van Diemen's Land	Hanged	
James Nesbitt	1858–1879	New South Wales	Shot by police	
John O'Meally	1841–1863	New South Wales	Shot	
George Palmer	c. 1846–1869	Queensland	Hanged	
Alexander Pearce	1790–1824	Van Diemen's Land	Hanged	
John Peisley	1834–1862	New South Wales	Hanged	
Sam Poo	?–1865	New South Wales	Hanged	
Harry Power	1819–1891	North East Victoria	Imprisoned, died a free man	
Rocky (alias of John Whelan)	c. 1805–1855	Van Diemen's Land	Hanged	
Charles Rutherford	c. 1846–1869	New South Wales	Shot	
Owen Suffolk	1829–?	Victoria	Imprisoned, cause of death unknown	
James Sutherland	1865–1883	Tasmania	Hanged	
Sydney Jim (alias of William Thornton)	1816–1858	Tasmania	Shot by police	
John Tennant	1794–1837	New South Wales	Hanged	
John Thompson	c. 1847–?	New South Wales	Imprisoned, cause of death unknown	
John Vane	1842–1906	New South Wales	Imprisoned, died a free man	
Wild Toby	c. 1840–1883	Queensland	Shot by police	
William Westwood	1820–1846	New South Wales; Van Diemen's Land	Hanged	
