= Andrew Bent =

Australian newspaper publisher

- Born: 1790; St Giles-in-the-Field London, England
- Died: 26 August 1851 (age about 61); Sydney, New South Wales
- Occupations: Printer, publisher and newspaper proprietor
- Known for: The Hobart Town Gazette and Southern Reporter, Colonial Times
- Spouse: Mary Kirk (m. 19 September 1816)

Andrew Bent (ca.1791 – 26 August 1851) was a printer, publisher and newspaper proprietor, active in Australia. He established the first successful newspaper in Tasmania, was the first Australian newspaperman to print a newspaper free from government control, and the first Australian printer to be imprisoned for libel.

== Early life ==
Andrew Bent was born in St Giles-in-the-Fields London, England and baptized in the parish church on 24 October 1791. By 1808 he and his two younger brothers were orphaned, the parish later providing apprenticeships for the younger boys as paupers. Bent was apprenticed at an early age to a printer although no indentures have been found. Once thought to have been apprenticed at the London Times, Newgate records show that in 1810 he was 'a boy' belonging to John Crowder, printer of the Public Ledger newspaper, in Warwick Square.

In 1810, Bent was caught one Sunday morning trying to sell stolen clothing, boots and shoes in the taproom of the Sugar Loaf public house. Bent and his accomplice Philip Street were charged with breaking and entering the shop-house to which these items were traced. Both were condemned to death but the sentences were later commuted to transportation for life.

== Australia ==
=== Early career in Tasmania ===
Bent reached Sydney aboard the Guildford in January 1812, was transferred to the Ruby and arrived at Hobart Town Van Diemen's Land (now Tasmania) in February. Bent was reputedly assigned to George Clark, printer of the first Tasmanian newspaper, the short-lived Derwent Star and Van Diemen's Land Intelligencer (1810). In 1814, Clark, with Bent probably assisting, published the Van Diemen's Land Gazette and General Advertiser. In 1815, Clark was dismissed and Bent became Government Printer. In 1816, Bent began The Hobart Town Gazette and Southern Reporter, changing its title to Hobart Town Gazette and Van Diemen's Land Advertiser on 20 January 1821.

Bent received a conditional pardon in 1816 and an absolute pardon in 1821. In 1816 he married Irish convict Mary Kirk. His business flourished under the administrations of Lieutenant Governors Thomas Davey and William Sorell. New printing equipment arrived in 1823, and Bent was permitted to purchase it on his own account, by way of a government loan. He erected a new purpose-built printing office in Elizabeth Street and from the beginning of 1824 the newspaper was substantially enlarged in size and scope. Sorell appointed Henry James Emmett as editor (and censor) with Bent agreeing to pay his salary and continuing the established practice of submitting the proofs for government approval each week.

=== Freedom of the Press ===
The new Lieutenant Governor, Colonel George Arthur, arrived in May 1824. Soon after, following several days of escalating tension between printer and editor, Bent sacked Emmett and replaced him with Evan Henry Thomas. He also put the Gazette for 4 June 1824 to press without submitting the proofs for censorship, thus establishing the first free press in Australia some months before the commencement of Sydney's first independent newspaper, the Australian, and the removal of censorship from the Sydney Gazette. Arthur saw no place for a free press in a convict colony, and regarded the Gazette as government property although Bent claimed to have established it on his own initiative and at his own expense. Arthur asked his superior, Sir Thomas Brisbane, to pass a law requiring newspapers to be licensed. Bent sent his editor, Thomas, to Sydney to plead his case and the Governor in Chief decided in Bent's favour. On 8 October 1824 the Hobart Town Gazette announced Bent's victory in an article which referred to Arthur as a 'Gideonite of tyranny'.

The Attorney-General, Joseph Tice Gellibrand, immediately proposed prosecuting the printer for this gross libel on the governor, but Arthur hesitated, concentrating instead on plans for establishing another vehicle for promulgating government information. It took until the middle of 1825 for this to happen, and in the meantime Bent's unrestricted newspaper began to attack the local administration, both editorially, and through the letters of 'A Colonist' (Robert Lathrop Murray) who was feted at public dinners by free colonists who, for various reasons, were becoming increasingly disaffected with Arthur.

In June 1825 Bent was dismissed from his position as Government Printer. His successors, Dr. James Ross and George Terry Howe took over the gazette printing on 25 June, with a new newspaper which appropriated Bent's short title and continued its numbering. Bent regarded this action as piracy of his copyright. Two newspapers entitled the Hobart Town Gazette appeared each week until 19 August, when Bent changed his title to the Colonial Times, and Van Diemen's Land Advertiser. Bent and Thomas parted company when the new government paper commenced and Murray became Bent's editor.

In July and August 1825, Bent was tried on two indictments, each comprising several counts of criminal libel, including the "Gideonite" article. At both he was found guilty by a military jury, despite stating that he had not written any of the offending material and offering to give up the authors (Thomas and Murray). He was retried on the first indictment in February 1826 because of an error in recording the verdict at the original trial. Bent was sentenced to a total of six months imprisonment and fines of £300, plus sureties for good behavior. Chief Justice John Lewes Pedder, in sentencing, hoped that this would prevent Bent's newspaper 'continuing to be the tool of a faction'.

In 1827 Bent was again convicted of criminal libels on the local government but not called up for judgment. In October of that year two Acts of Council imposing restrictions on newspapers came into force. Both were targeted specifically at Bent and the alleged "baneful influence" of his Colonial Times. The first Act imposed a stamp duty and the second included, among other provisions, a requirement that printers of newspapers be licensed by the Lieutenant Governor. The Colonial Times of 19 October appeared with deep mourning borders and blank news columns in protest. Despite extensive negotiations, Bent's application for a license was repeatedly refused. He continued to print the Colonial Times as an advertising sheet, and distributed it gratis. In March 1828 he commenced a monthly magazine, the Colonial Advocate, which managed to evade the Act, but, finding himself in prison once more on charges relating to the Colonial Times, was forced to relinquish it after only eight numbers.

Late in 1828 Arthur received orders from the Colonial Office to rescind the license provision as repugnant to English law. The Colonial Times again appeared as a full newspaper, but early the following year Bent sold his printing equipment and newspaper business to Henry Melville.

In January 1830 Bent was found guilty of libeling the Under Sheriff, Michael Kennedy, who was awarded damages of £100. In May he was convicted of libels on solicitor Gamaliel Butler which had appeared in a series of satirical sketches by the anonymous "Hermit in Van Diemen's Land" (convict writer Henry Savery). Butler was awarded £80 damages. Butler v. Bent was the first such case in Tasmania to be heard by a civil jury of twelve.

== Later life and career ==
In 1832 Bent resumed business as a printer. For two years, commencing in July 1832, he printed the anti-Arthur newspaper the Colonist and Van Diemen's Land Commercial and Agricultural Advertiser for its trustee proprietors George Meredith and T. G. Gregson. He also assisted Gilbert Robertson, the proprietor and editor of its successor, the True Colonist, by printing it at his office while Robertson was in prison for libel in 1835.

At the beginning of 1836 Bent commenced his last Tasmanian newspaper, Bent's News and Tasmanian Threepenny Register. When Arthur was recalled later in the year, Bent petitioned the House of Commons, via MP Joseph Hume, seeking compensation for business losses which, he asserted, were caused by Arthur's illegal and oppressive conduct. He was unsuccessful.

In 1838, Bent was again convicted of libel for several articles printed in Bent's News.

Bent left Tasmania in 1839 and headed for Sydney. On 13 April 1839, Bent published Bent's News and New South Wales Advertiser as a weekly paper but he soon sold it and it became the Australasian Chronicle. Bent moved to the Macleay River where he kept a hotel and was a cedar merchant. The hotel burned down, the cedar was swept away in a flood and Bent was incapacitated for six months after a fall. In 1844 he appealed for public charity. Destitute, Bent entered the Sydney Benevolent Society Asylum, where he died on 26 August 1851, leaving a large family.

== Achievements ==
E. M. Miller wrote that "Andrew Bent is worthy of remembrance for his indomitable fight for the freedom of the press in Tasmania, and for his exceptional typographical productions in the form of newspapers, magazines, books and pamphlets, including the first literary works separately published in Tasmania". In 2018, Andrew Bent was inducted into the Australian Media Hall of Fame.

The following books and pamphlets were all firsts of their kind and are described in J. A. Ferguson's Bibliography of Australia.

- 1819. Michael Howe, the Last and Worst of the Bush Rangers of Van Diemen's Land. The first work of general literature printed in Australasia and first non-government book printed in Tasmania. Published anonymously. A long-standing attribution of the authorship to Thomas Wells has recently been challenged and it now seems likely that the work was compiled by Bent himself.
- 1824. The Van Diemen's Land Pocket Almanack. The first almanac in Tasmania. Continued annually by the Tasmanian Almanack, 1825-1830.
- 1827. The Van Diemen's Land Warriors, or Heroes of Cornwall by Pindar Juvenal. The first book of verse printed in Tasmania
- 1829. The Hermit in Van Diemen's Land. The first book of essays printed in Australia. A reprint of satirical sketches by 'Simon Stukely' (convict writer Henry Savery) which had appeared in the Colonial Times. Publication was suspended due to a libel action although some copies have survived.
