= Thomas Richards (Tasmania) =

Australian journalist

Thomas Richards (1800 – 18 July 1877) was a Welsh surgeon, antiquarian, writer of fiction and journalist who emigrated to Hobart, Tasmania, Australia. He was the editor of and main contributor to the Hobart Town Magazine and came to be seen as one of the founders of Tasmanian journalism.

== Childhood ==
St. Mary's Church, Dolgellau, where Richards was baptised on 28 August 1800.

A view of Dolgellau at the time of Richards's childhood.

Thomas Richards was born in Dolgellau as the first child of Thomas Richards (d. 1808), solicitor, and Elizabeth (née Highway) his wife (d. 1832). There is no record of the exact date of his birth but he was baptised in St Mary's Church, Dolgellau on 27 August 1800, preceded by a private baptism on 10 July.

== Family ==
He married Hannah Ellesmere (née Adams) on 26 November 1828 in St Pancras, London; they had two sons and four daughters.

== Career ==
Following the death of his father, Richards was enrolled at Christ's Hospital school, London between 1809 and 1815. He then became a doctor's apprentice and attended clinics at St Bartholomew's Hospital. He graduated with a Licentiate of the Society of Apothecaries in 1823. Until his emigration to Tasmania, he worked as a doctor in London. He also contributed occasionally to several literary and antiquarian magazines, such as The Edinburgh Magazine, The Cambro-Briton, The Monthly Magazine and The British Register.

In 1832 Richards paid for his and his family's passage to Australia by working as a ship's doctor on the migrant ship Princess Royal. His wife and firstborn child, Douglas Highway Richards, went with him on the trip as the family wanted to settle in Australia at the end of the trip. He arrived in Hobart town in October 1832. He established a surgery in Elizabeth Town, Tasmania.

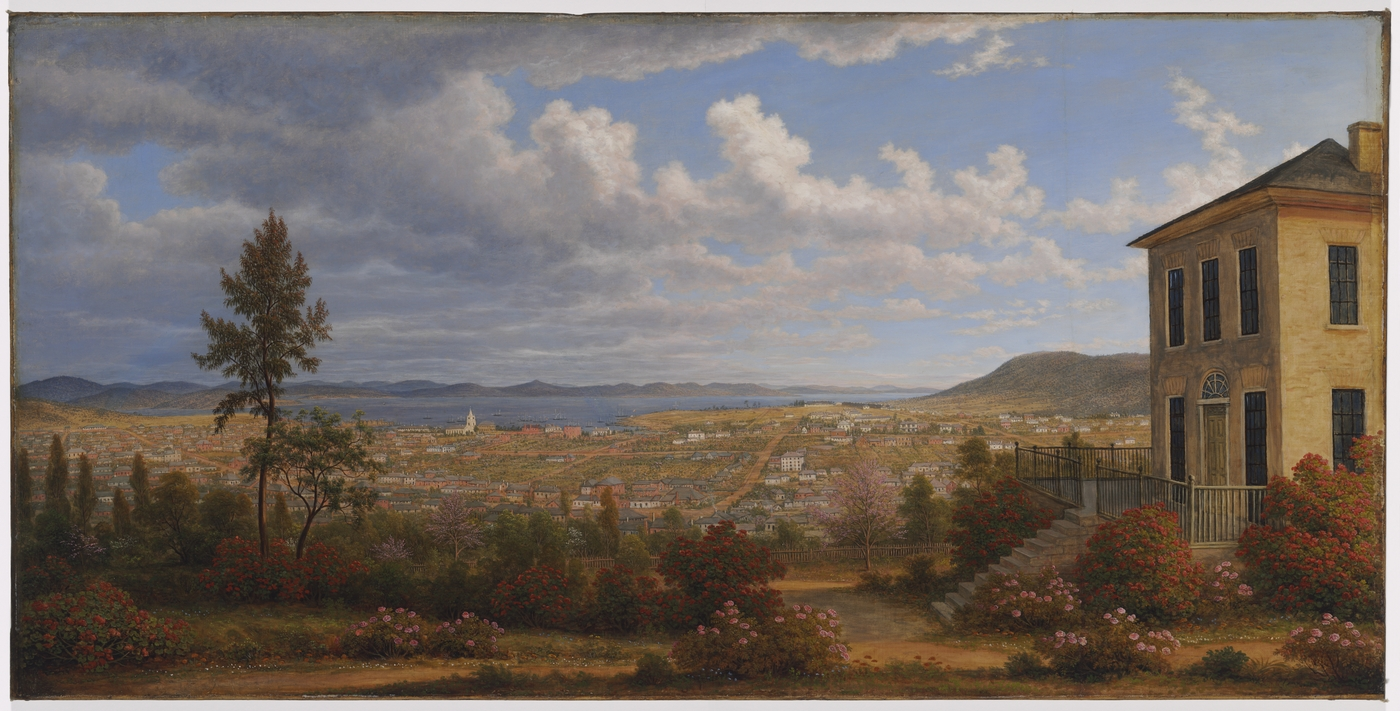
A view of Hobart Town around the time of Richards's and his family's emigration to Tasmania, then Van Diemen's Land, in 1832.

Shortly after Richards arrived in Tasmania, Henry Melville (1799–1873) founded the Hobart Town Magazine. Richards was the main editor and contributor to the magazine during its short life between March 1833 and 1834.

He continued as a medical practitioner until 1836, although he had been working as a clerk for the Hobart Town Surveyor's Department between 1834 and 1837. Between 1837 and 1847 he became the chief reporter of the Colonial Times newspaper. After a visit to Britain between 1847 and 1848 he returned to Tasmania working again as a doctor for a while. Later in his life he went back to journalism as a reporter and proofreader for the Hobart Mercury, continuing in the post until his death.

For his long contribution to journalism on the island, Richards is sometimes referred to as 'the father of the Tasmanian press'. However, other sources bestow that honour on the printer Andrew Bent.

== Writer ==
It is difficult to estimate his complete critical, antiquarian and literary output as he often wrote under pseudonyms in order to hide the extent of the content of the papers that had come from his pen. 'Mervinius', 'Edward Trevor Anwyl' and 'Peregrine' were among the names he used prior to his emigration to Australia. The majority of his short stories has a Welsh background and is set between Barmouth and Dolgellau in the county of his childhood, Merionethshire. Much of his unsigned output can be traced thanks to his habit of re-using entire sections across several of his antiquarian essays and short stories.

In 2017 Rita Singer collected and edited a selection of Richards's Welsh stories for the first time and published them as Rob the Red-Hand and Other Stories of Welsh Society and Scenery. In a review of the book, Bethan Jenkins wrote These stories are suffused with an almost unbearably aching melancholy; for a lost country, lost youth, and first love.

Richards was Australia's first literary critic and a pioneer of the Tasmanian short story. A significant volume of Richards' recognisable literary work was published in the Hobart Town Magazine. At least half of the magazine's content was poems, essays, reviews, sketches and short stories by him.

== Translations ==
Although considered a minor writer, at least two of Richards's works were translated into other languages during his lifetime. His short-story collection Tales of Welsh Society and Scenery (1827) was translated into German as Romantische Darstellungen aus Wallis (1828). 'Ysbryd Pont Fatthew' is an abridged Welsh translation of Richards's short story 'The Spectre of Pont Vathu' (1822).

== Death ==
Richards died at his home Portsea Place in Montpelier Street, Hobart, after a few days of illness on 18 July 1877. His death certificate lists infirmity and old age as the causes of death.
