= William Thornton (disambiguation) =

William Thornton (1759–1828) was an American physician, inventor, painter and architect.

William, Willie, Bill, or Billy Thornton may also refer to:

== Law and politics ==
- William Thornton (died 1769) (died 1769), English politician
- William Thornton (Virginia burgess) (1717–1790), British American colonial jurist
- William Thornton (Queensland politician) (1817–1884), Irish politician in Australia
- William Taylor Thornton (1843–1916), governor of New Mexico Territory
- William L. Thornton (1844–1915), American politician and judge in New York
- William Wheeler Thornton (1851–1932), American jurist and author in Indiana
- William J. Thornton (1878–1951), American politician in Illinois
- Neville Thornton (William Neville John Thornton) (born 1939/1940), Northern Irish politician
- Bill Thornton, American politician in Texas
- William Thornton (Kansas politician), American politician in Kansas

== Sports ==
- Billy Thornton (rugby league) (fl. 1920s–1940s), English rugby league footballer
- Willie Thornton (1920–1991), Scottish footballer
- Bill Thornton (American football) (1939–2008), American football fullback
- Willie Thornton (Canadian football) (born 1986), Canadian football wide receiver

== Others ==
- William Thornton (academic) (died 1707), English academic
- William Thornton (British Army officer) (1779–1840), British general
- William Thomas Thornton (1813–1880), English economist
- Sydney Jim (William Thornton, 1816–1858), English-born convict in Australia
- William Patton Thornton (1817–1883), American physician
- William Thornton (firefighter) (1826–1848), Canadian firefighter
- William E. Thornton (1929–2021), American astronaut
- Billy Bob Thornton (born 1955), American actor
