= Bluecap (disambiguation) =

Bluecap or blue cap may refer to:

- Bluecap, a fairy or ghost in English folklore
- Bluecap (bushranger), an Australian bushranger
- Bluecap Memorial, a memorial to a foxhound in Cheshire, England
- The Bluecaps, a band formed by American musician Gene Vincent
- Centaurea cyanus, a rare English regional name for this plant species
