= Frederick Cranley =

Bushranger in New South Wales, Australia (1847–1877)

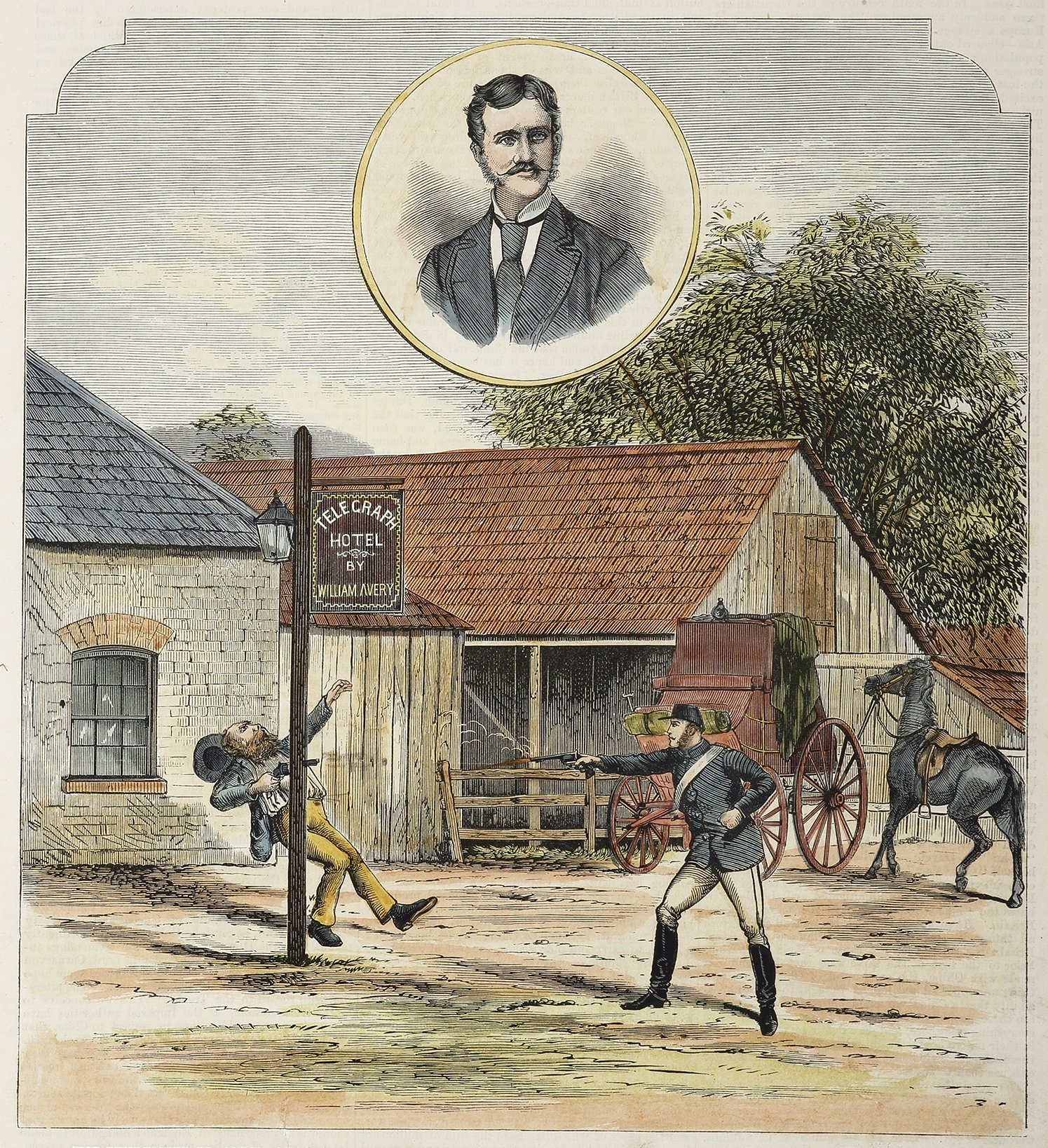
Cranley being shot by Constable Edward Webb-Bowen

Frederick William Cranley (c. 1847 – 14 July 1877) was a bushranger in the Colony of New South Wales, Australia.

While little is documented about Cranley's early life, he was said to have been born in the East Indies, and worked near Tamworth in New South Wales as a fencer.

In 1877, Cranley, along with his companion Stephen Ware Wonnocott, decided to take up bushranging. Their new career was cut short on 14 July of that year when they stuck up W. C. Avery's Telegraph Hotel in Bendemeer. Cranley threatened the staff with his revolver and fired a shot, narrowly missing W. C. Avery's wife. In the chaos, word got out that bushrangers were robbing the hotel, prompting Constable Edward Mostyn Webb-Bowen to ride to the scene and confront Cranley and Wonnocott. Bowen ordered Cranley to surrender, but the bushranger shot twice at the constable, the second shot misfiring. Bowen returned fire, fatally wounding Cranley, who died shortly after. His companion Wonnocott was apprehended and sent to Armidale, where he was tried, convicted and sentenced to fifteen years imprisonment.

Following his encounter with Cranley, Edward Webb-Bowen was promoted to officer-in-charge of the police station in Murrundi. He desired to be near the supposed haunts of bushranger Ned Kelly and his gang, so he was sent to Gundagai in April 1879. In November of that year, Edward Webb-Bowen received a fatal bullet wound during a shootout with Captain Moonlite's gang at Wantabadgery.

== Legacy ==
Cranley's bushranging career was fictionalised in a short story published by the tabloid magazine Smith's Weekly in 1926.

== Bibliography ==
- Calderwood, G. (1971). Captain Moonlite: Bushranger. Rigby. ISBN 9780851792132.
