= Jack the Rammer =

Jack the Rammer, alias of William Roberts, was a bushranger in the Monaro District near Cooma in New South Wales during the mid-1830s.

== Life ==
Born and raised in England, William Roberts was a cooper by trade, with a wife and three children, when he was sentenced seven years for stealing a bucket and transported to New South Wales. He arrived in Australia in September 1833, and escaped from his first convict assignment the following year. Placed in Goulburn Jail he met fellow convict Joseph Keys and the pair escaped together.

Roberts and Keys headed for the Monaro District, where they met up with Edward Boyd, and began bushranging. In December 1834, the three "stuck up" the station of Joseph Catterall, badly wounding the station overseer Charles Fisher Shepherd, who, in turn, shot and killed Roberts. In January 1835, troopers caught up with Boyd and Keys, and Boyd was killed. Keys was captured and pleaded guilty.
