= Major the Outlaw =

Australian outlaw (c. 1880s –1908)

Major the Outlaw (c. late 1880s – 1908) was a Wagiman man from the Daly River region of the Northern Territory who was considered an 'Aboriginal outlaw' and bushranger who was shot dead by a police punitive expedition.

== Biography ==
Little is known of Major's early life or childhood except that he was 'picked up' as a small boy by a South Australian based stockman Jack Kelly and, by 1898, was working with him at Texas Downs Station in Western Australia. His birth name is also not known and the name Major was given to him jokingly. There are a number of theories about his life before this but none of them are known for certain.

Major was mistreated by Kelly significantly and he was often beaten. A fellow Aboriginal station worker, Jack Sullivan said of him that:

Kelly was a hard man on the boy. He used to belt Major and all that stunt, or throw him in a waterhole early in the morning. Sometimes overnight he would put him in a big sack bag and hang him up in a tree. He was a cruel feller [fella] this Kelly.

— Jack Sullivan (via Bruce Shaw), They same as you and me, Aboriginal History, 1979

As Major grew though he was more able to stand him ground and, in some instances, beat Kelly himself. Major also travelled a number of times with Kelly to Perth where he worked as a police tracker and as a courier.

A turning point in Major's life is when he was falsely accused of a crime and was flogged by Kelly and then taken, in chains, to Wyndham to face trial. He was later released from there, after an unknown period, and was allowed to return to Texas Downs where he sought revenge for being falsely accused.

Back at Texas Downs, at a nearly outstation near Growler's Gully, Major and two other Aboriginal men, Nipper and Dibbie (Debbie) shot and killed three white workers named Scotty McDonald, Davis (or Davidson) and Fettle in July 1908. The group then retreated, alongside others such as one of Majors wives Biddy, to the hilly landscape of Mistake Creek and a police punitive expedition then followed with officers sent from Wyndham, Turkey Creek, Halls Creek and Timber Creek.

Despite the number of officers sent the group remained at large for at least three months (July to September 1908) and their stronghold, which was described as a rock shelter with views of the terrain in most directions, and during this period they harassed travelers and stock workers passing through while also being able to leave regularly for hunting trips.

The men soon tired of hiding and decided to leave the relative safety of the hill country. They split up, with Major planning to travel to Darwin, and were each shot separately by members of the punitive party. Both Nipper and Dibbie were shot by Aboriginal trackers but it is not clear who shot or killed Major; it is known that he was first shot in the hand. After his death his hand was removed and kept as a trophy.

At the time of his death Major was between 18 and 24 years old.
