= James Sutherland (bushranger) =

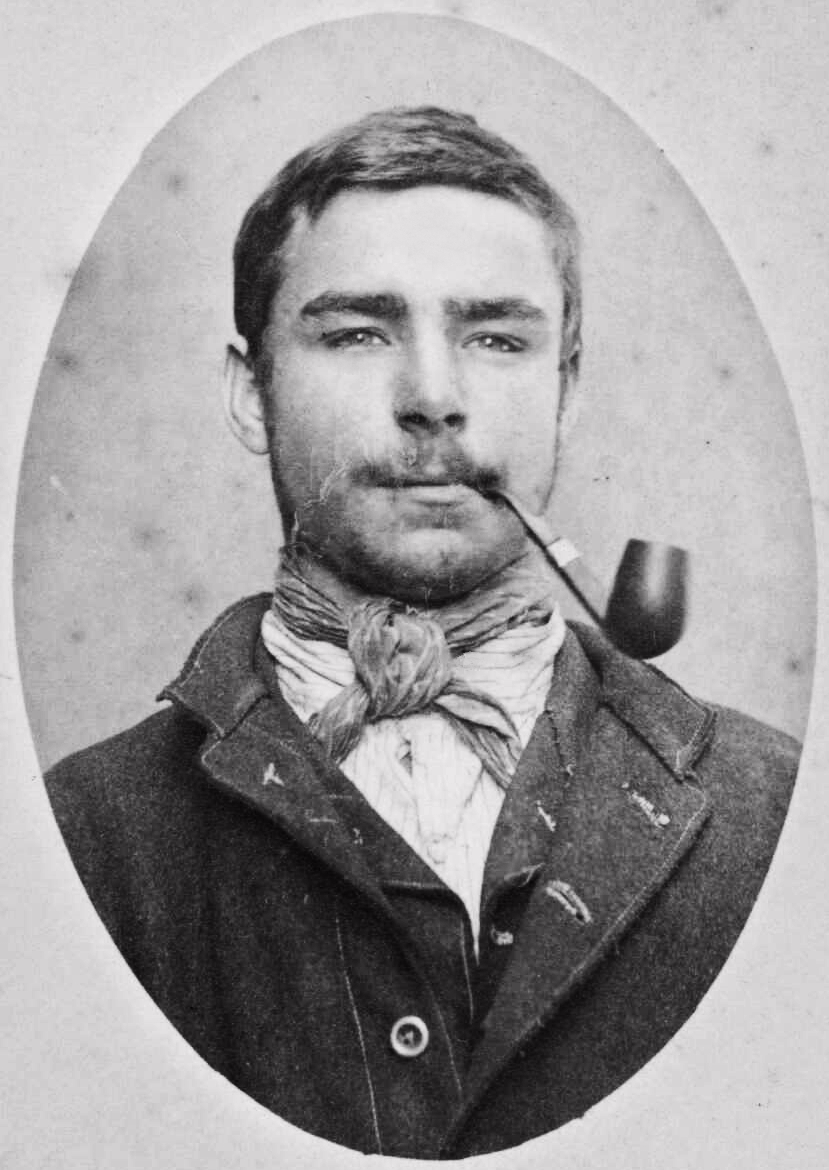
Police mugshot of Sutherland, 1883

James Sutherland (1865 – 4 June 1883), born James Saunders, was an Australian bushranger active in Tasmania.

== Early life ==
Sutherland was born in Ouse, a town in the Central Highlands of Tasmania, Australia. When he was 18 months old, his father left him in the care of a woman in Perth, south of Launceston. She raised him until he was five, during which time he was given the surname Sutherland. He was then placed in the care of another woman in Evandale. She abandoned him when he was aged 11, and Sutherland was left to fend for himself. He attempted to return to Perth but was arrested under the Vagrancy Act and sentenced to three months in gaol.

After his release, Sutherland moved to Hobart, where he worked as a dogsbody at a hotel, but grew to resent his employers, alleging that they mistreated him. On 18 November 1878, he was tried at Longford for being idle and disorderly, and sentenced to three months imprisonment at Hobart Gaol. During his incarceration, he posed for a visiting photographer alongside friend and fellow prisoner James Ogden, who was serving time for larceny.

Sutherland later found employment at a farm at Kangaroo Point, where he remained for three years before deciding to pursue a career in mining. Despite occasional sightings in Launceston, little is known about his life during this period.

== Criminal activities and bushranging ==
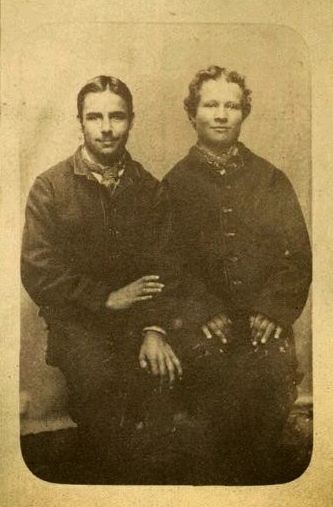
Sutherland and Ogden

In early 1883, Sutherland partnered with 20-year-old James Ogden in committing armed robberies and engaging in other bushranging activities in and around Epping Forest. As a result of their "reign of terror", they became known as the Epping desperadoes, and the government offered a reward for their apprehension. Their crime spree culminated in the murder of two men: telegraph linesman William Wilson and mail coach driver Alfred Holman. Wilson was shot after leaving his home, which the bushrangers subsequently burned down, while Holman was shot as he drove his cart through the forest. Sutherland and Ogden were known to sing bush ballads about Ned Kelly and his gang, and according to The Mercury, they committed crimes "in a state of imaginative imitation of [the Kelly gang], almost believing themselves to be identical with those bushrangers".

== Capture and execution ==
Sutherland and Ogden were captured soon after Holman's body was discovered and were subsequently tried for murder at the Supreme Court of Tasmania. During the trial, Sutherland accepted the charges against him and expressed little remorse, suggesting that his harsh experiences growing up justified his actions. The Examiner concluded that Sutherland had not "the smallest atom of humanity". When the jury retired to consider their verdict, Sutherland said aloud, "What do those bloody fools want to consider about? I've shot the man, isn't that enough?" The jury found Sutherland and Ogden guilty, and they were executed in Hobart on 4 June 1883. Sutherland's final words were, "It's no use feeling sorry now."

== Bibliography ==
- Emmett, Evelyn Temple (1937). A Short History of Tasmania. Angus & Robertson.
- Harris, Steve (2018). Solomon's Noose: The True Story of Her Majesty's Hangman of Hobart. Melbourne Books. ISBN 9781922129833.
