= Hobart Town Gazette =

Newspaper established in 1816 in Van Diemen's Land

- Founded: 11 May 1816
- Language: English
- City: Hobart, Tasmania

The Hobart Town Gazette was established in 1816 in Hobart, Van Diemen's Land (known as Tasmania since 1856) as The Hobart Town Gazette and Southern Reporter. In 1821 the name was changed to the Hobart Town Gazette and Van Diemen's Land Advertiser. In 1825 the title was split, with the government authorised publication remaining the Hobart Town Gazette, and the original editor launching the Colonial Times, and Tasmanian Advertiser . From 1882 it was known as the Hobart Gazette and from 1907 as the Tasmanian Government Gazette.
