= Bluecap (bushranger) =

Australian bushranger

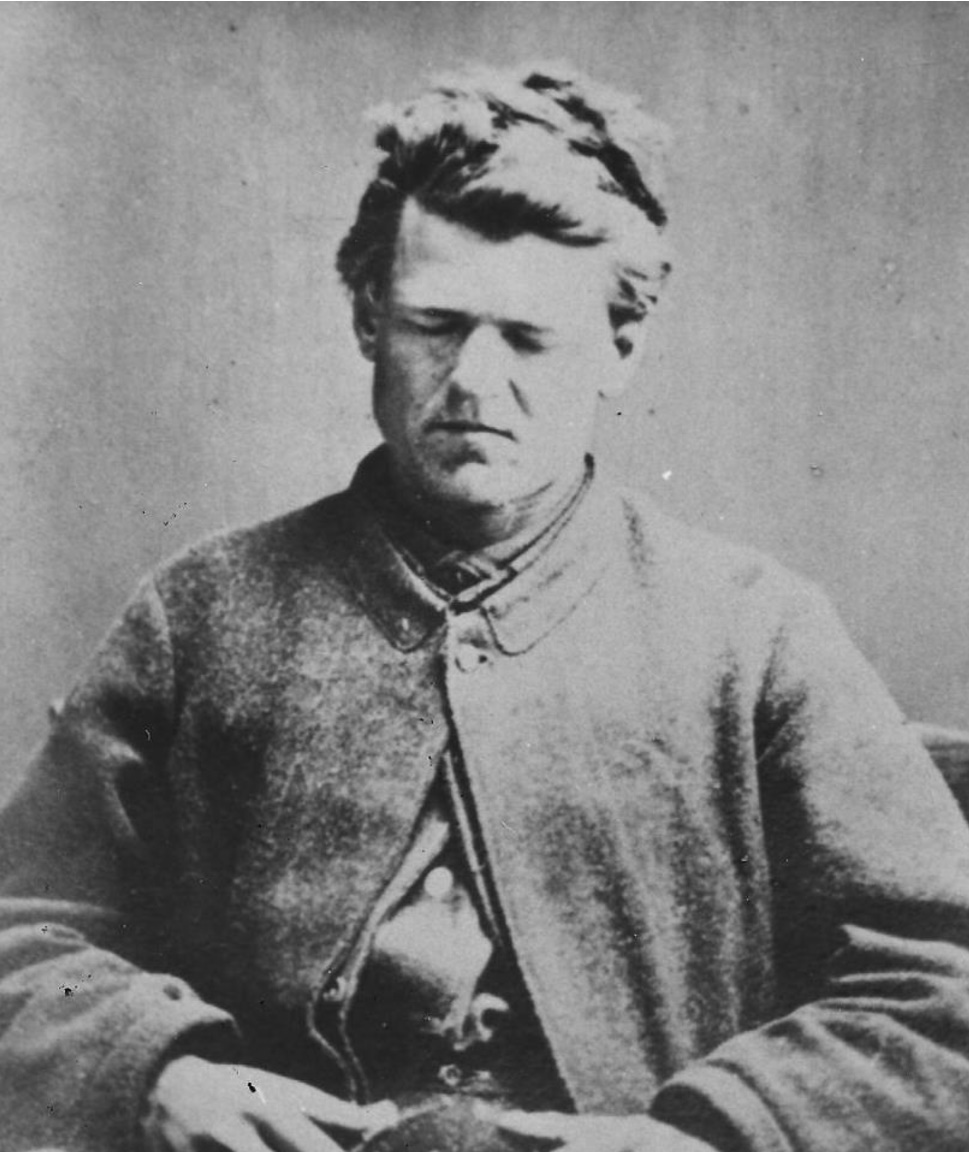
- Born: Robert Cotterell; 27 March 1847; Sydney, New South Wales, Australia
- Died: Unknown
- Other names: Bluecap; Captain Bluecap
- Occupation: bushranger

Bluecap (born Robert Cotterell; 1847 – after 1873) was an Australian bushranger. Born and raised in New South Wales, he began bushranging in 1867, leading a gang responsible for robberies throughout the Riverina region. He suffered from ophthalmia, and earned his alias on account of a piece of cloth he wore to protect his eyes from sunlight. Captured in November 1867, Bluecap was tried and convicted of armed robbery. He was imprisoned in Parramatta Gaol and released in 1874.

== Biography ==
=== Early life ===
Robert Cotterell was born on 27 March 1847 in Sydney (St. Andrew's parish), the son of Robert Cotterell and Jane (née Regan). Cotterell was "practically raised" by Thomas White of ‘Burrangong’ station near Young. As a young man Cotterell was employed as a stockman on ‘Curraburrama’ station (between Barmedman and Quandialla). He suffered from ophthalmia, an inflammation of the eyes that made him sensitive to light, and wore a protective shade over his eyes.

Robert Cotterell's first known encounter with the law was when he was aged 19 years. He was arrested by Constable Hipkiss and Tracker Molly of the Forbes police and charged with shooting at Richard Taylor with the intent to do grievous bodily harm. The incident was reported to have taken place on 21 March 1866 at Humbug Creek (north-west of Wyalong). Cotterell was committed for trial; he appeared before the Bathurst Circuit Court on 18 April and was acquitted of the charge.

At the first signs of Cotterell intending to take up bushranging, it was said that Thomas White, who had known the young man since he was a child, "used all his persuasive powers to prevent ‘Bluecap’ from embarking upon his course of outlawry". However, despite his best efforts Cotterell "succumbed to the influence of the bushrangers".

=== The Bluecap gang ===
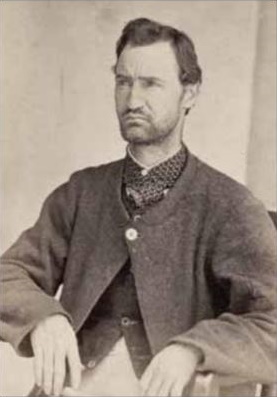
Bluecap gang member John Williams, also known by the aliases Jerry Duce and White Chief

When Robert Cotterell determined to engage in bushranging he initially teamed up with two other young men, John Williams and John Irvine Scott. John Williams (born at Goulburn in 1846) used the alias ‘Jerry Duce’ or ‘White Chief’. John Irvine Scott (born at Tarcutta in about 1848) used the alias 'Jack the Devil' or 'Scotch Jock'.

The gang’s first robbery was possibly in June 1867 when two armed men robbed the Sydney Hotel at Spring Creek near Young, taking a small amount of money, a revolver and "a bottle of grog". Later in the year, after the notorious Bluecap had been captured, the publican Philip Saunders testified that he was unable to swear that Cotterell was one of the men that robbed him (and consequently no charge was laid for that offence).

At about 10 o’clock on the night of 28 June Carl Lehmann was in his store at Stoney Creek when two armed men entered (one of whom he later identified as Robert Cotterell). The bandits took money from the cashbox as well as clothing items such as Crimean shirts and two ponchos. The men then escorted Lehmann to the bar of the adjoining inn and locked the doors so they could have a drink. Later that night the police arrived, knocked on the door and announced their presence. Cotterell (or his companion) said: "We’re too long here, it’s time to be off". The pair left by the back door, mounted their horses and escaped into the night.

On the evening of 15 July 1867 Cotterell, Duce and Scott bailed up William Marshall and his female employee at the Traveller’s Home inn on ‘Rock’ station, on ‘The Levels’ 30 miles north-west of Cootamundra. The gang were armed and remained at the inn for about an hour, each of them eating a meal during that time. The items stolen from the inn and adjoining store were £10 in cash, four bottles of brandy, a saddle, and several guns, gunpowder and caps. Nine days later, on 24 July, Cotterell and Duce bailed up Jeremiah Lehane and several of his employees at Lehane’s grazing property at Reedy Creek (near Jugiong). The grazier asked Cotterell if he belonged to the police force, to which he replied: "No, I am a bushranger". Cotterell then ordered Lehane to take him to his private office where he stole a pistol and some cash. Before leaving the bushrangers also took a saddle from the stables.

Bluecap assumed leadership of the gang as it committed many audacious raids, robbing stations and travellers in an area covering Young, Griffith, Narrandera and Tumut. It earned a reputation as the most formidable gang in New South Wales. During one raid on a station, while his men helped themselves to provisions, Bluecap nursed and played with the manager's daughter, two-year-old Mary Gilmore, who grew up to become a renowned poet. After raiding a station owned by Cuthbert Fetherstonhaugh, the gang crossed the flooded Urangeline Creek with mounted police in pursuit. One gang member, Hammond, drowned in the process. This first incarnation of the Bluecap Gang disbanded soon after. White Chief was eventually caught and sentenced to death but this was later commuted to fifteen years on the roads.

=== Events at 'Bolero' station ===
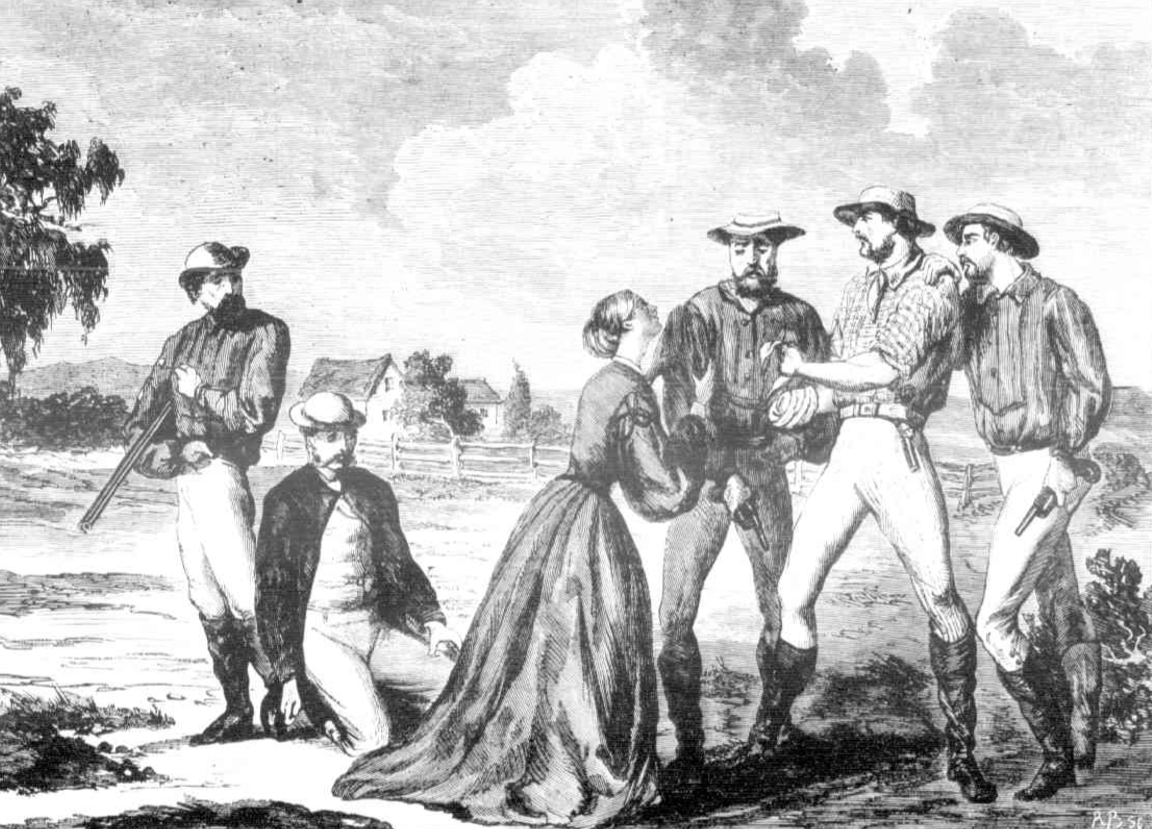
’Encounter with Bushrangers – Mrs. Wills Interceding for Doolan’, an artist’s interpretation of the events at ‘Bolero’ station; published in Illustrated Adelaide Post, September 1867.

On Sunday 18 August Bluecap and three gang members appeared at ‘Bolero’ station (north of Narrandera) and were in the process of appropriating three horses. A young man called Thomas Doolan, armed with three pistols, came riding along the fence near the station. In the version told by Doolan and recounted in the colonial press, Bluecap, ‘Jack the Devil’ and Williams then rode to meet him, prompting Doolan to gallop away. During a subsequent exchange of gunfire between Doolan and the pursuing bushrangers, Bluecap was wounded on the wrist and his horse received a bullet in the chest. Eventually Doolan’s horse fell and he was captured. They walked him back to the station where twenty men were bailed up by King, the other gang member. Near the station buildings Bluecap forced Doolan down on his knees, "telling him he would give him ten minutes to say his prayers". At this juncture Mrs. Wills "came down from the station and entreated the bushrangers not to harm him". Williams, who knew Doolan, also expressed a wish that he not be hurt. These appeals caused Bluecap to give up "his bloodthirsty design", telling Doolan "that he might thank Mrs. Wills and Williams for his life".

The story of a brave young man battling bushrangers against all odds, his life being spared by a woman’s intercession, obviously resonated with the editors of colonial newspapers. First published in the Wagga Wagga Express, the story was reprinted in newspapers from Queensland to Tasmania. The police, however, had their suspicions, in particular Senior-Constable Foley of Narrandera. On 1 October Doolan was arrested and charged with stealing pistols, the property of William Flood of ‘Bolero’ station. Doolan was informed that the basis of the charge was that he had aided the bushrangers who had ultimately taken possession of the pistols. By this time several of Bluecap’s gang had been arrested and they testified at Doolan’s trial, held on 25 October at the Wagga Wagga Circuit Court. The story that came to light at the trial revealed a sham fight had been arranged between Doolan and Bluecap and his gang, all of whom were acquainted with each other. The squatter Flood had previously lent Doolan three pistols in order that he might "protect himself from the bushrangers". Evidence at the trial revealed that when Doolan was being fired upon at ‘Bolero’ the "pistols were only loaded with powder". Doolan shot Blue Cap’s black mare and Blue Cap "put the blood from the mare on his arm" to pretend he had been wounded.

=== Capture ===
Bluecap was captured "very simply" by the police on Monday, 4 November 1867, by three constables of the Young police force. The policemen and Cotterell happened to be travelling along the Bland Road in opposite directions. In the vicinity of Humbug Creek (near Wyalong) Bluecap saw the police approaching, but as he was riding a horse that was "knocked up" he made no attempt to escape, and instead "trusted to pass by unchallenged, in the same manner he boasts of having often done before, and bidding the police ‘good day’". However one of the policemen, Constable Corbett, had known Cotterell before he took up bushranging and greeted him, saying: "Hallo Bluey, what brings you here". Realising it was useless to either deceive or resist, Cotterell surrendered. Two days later he appeared before the police court at Young and was remanded on six charges of armed robbery.

On Monday 20 April 1868 at the Wagga Wagga Circuit Court Robert Cotterell appeared to answer the charges of armed robbery and assault of Carl Lehmann in late June 1867 at Stoney Creek and also William Marshall at ‘Rock’ station in mid-July, as well as assault and robbery in October of Marshall and Jeremiah Lehane. Cotterell pleaded guilty to each of the three charges. It was reported that the prisoner appeared to be "dreadfully ill". His face was pale and mostly shielded "by a large green shade" to protect his eyes. It was noted that Cotterell looked "about as little like a dangerous bushranger as could well have been conceived". He was sentenced on the following Wednesday, receiving different sentences for each of the offences amounting to ten years’ hard labour on the roads.

Cotterell served 6 and half years before being released in 1874.

== Literary legacy ==
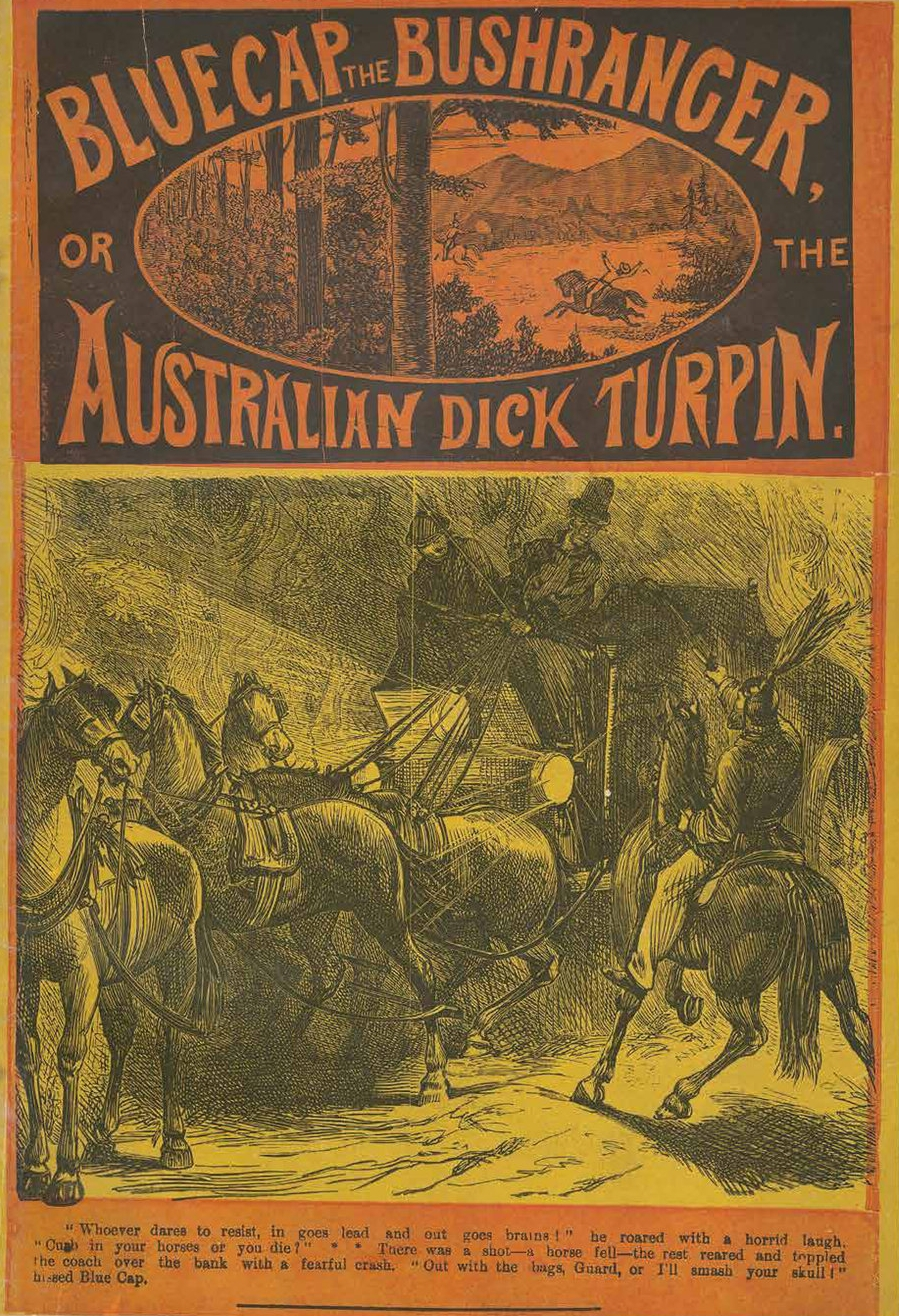
Borlase's Bluecap the Bushranger, or the Australian Dick Turpin, published in 1879

English writer James Skipp Borlase wrote a penny dreadful novel inspired by Bluecap entitled Blue Cap the Bushranger, or the Australian Dick Turpin. The story first appeared in 1876 as a serial in The Boy's Standard. It was published in book form in 1879 in the Hogarth House Library series. The plot, often describing acts of brutal violence, revolves around the hero Ted Hogan and the villainous Blue Cap, an escaped convict. By the end of the novel Hogan obtains his rightful reward and Blue Cap meets an untimely end, his body mummified in the harsh Australian sun. Borlase lived in Australia during Bluecap's bushranging career, and returned to England in 1869.

Best known for his 1882 bushranging novel Robbery Under Arms, writer and squatter Rolf Boldrewood was held up by Bluecap and his gang when riding home from Wagga Wagga. This incident inspired scenes in his novels The Squatter's Dream (1878), in which the bushranger is renamed Redcap, and The Crooked Stick (1895). Boldrewood recounted the experience in a memoir titled Fallen Among Thieves, included in his 1901 book In Bad Company: And Other Stories.

When Barcroft Boake, the bush poet, was found dead from suicide in 1892, he had in his pocket a manuscript for a set of verses about Cuthbert Fetherstonhaugh's encounter with Bluecap. Titled "Fetherstonhaugh", the poem was first published posthumously in The Bulletin, 11 June 1892, and later in Boake's poetry collection, Where the Dead Men Lie, and Other Poems (1897).
