= Henry Melville =

Australian journalist, author, occultist and Freemason

Henry Saxelby Melville Wintle (1799 – 22 December 1873), commonly referred to as Henry Melville, was an Australian journalist, author, occultist, and Freemason best remembered for writing the play The Bushrangers, his historical work The History of Van Diemen's Land From the Year 1824 to 1835, and his occult philosophical work Veritas: Revelation of Mysteries, Biblical, Historical, and Social by Means of the Median and Persian Laws. His life was dramatized in the 1882 Princess Theatre (Bendigo) production Found, or Found Drowned.

== Early life and career (1799 – 1825) ==
Very little is known about Melville's life before his arrival in Hobart, then known as Hobart Town, in 1827; all that is known is that he was born in 1799 somewhere in New South Wales. His arrival in Hobart occurred during a time of severe conflict between the British settlers and the Tasmanian Aboriginals known as the Black War. It was in 1829 that Melville began to write his The History of Van Diemen's Land From the Year 1824 to 1835. In March 1830, Melville purchased his first newspaper The Colonial Times and later that year published, and printed, Henry Savery's Quintus Servinton; a novel which is claimed by some to be Australia's first published novel. The next year he purchased another newspaper, The Tasmanian, and later joined with another journalist by the name of Robert Murray to produce the Tasmanian and Southern Literary and Political Journal, but withdrew his interests in May 1832. In 1833, he founded the short-lived Hobart Town Magazine, a publication with serious literary ambitions, with Thomas Richards (1800-1877) acting as the publication's editor and main contributor.

In February 1832, Melville married Eliza Romney in New Norfolk, the daughter of an American immigrant by the name of Joseph Fisher. Over the years his articles and actions had drawn the attention of the then Lieutenant-Governor George Arthur who was dissatisfied with Melville's writing about the Black War and Arthur's treatment of the Tasmanian Aborigines. In 1835 Melville reunited with Murray to produce the Tasmanian and Austral-Asiatic Review, a project that would end in 1837. Later that year he founded his first paper The Trumpeter, which was an advertising paper, and attempted to publish his History of Van Diemen's Land but couldn't due to government disapproval of the outlook of the newspapers he controlled and refusal to allow him publication rights.

Later in 1835 he published Two Letters Written in Van Diemen's Land Shewing the Oppression and Tyranny of the Government in 1835 anonymously, these letters caused controversy and severely harmed the popularity of Lieutenant-Governor Arthur.

== Imprisonment (November 1835 – January 1836) ==
In November 1835, Melville published a commentary on the controversial Supreme Court case of R. Byran in the Colonial Times, this commentary proved so controversial that it led to his imprisonment for contempt of court; a move that may have been engineered by Lieutenant-Governor Arthur. While imprisoned he wrote a commentary on his time imprisoned entitled A few words on prison discipline and had his completed book smuggled to London and published. The History of Van Diemen's Land From the Year 1824 to 1835 proved to be a critical account of Lieutenant-Governor Arthur's administration and outlined disdain for Arthur's orders during the Black War.

After three months of imprisonment, Melville was released in January 1836.

== Later life and career (1836 – 1873) ==
After his imprisonment, Melville became relatively quiet in terms of controversial publishing; as he found himself ostracised amongst the political elite in Tasmania. In 1838, Melville found himself involved in a minor legal proceeding; this proceeding, though minor in consequence, proved to be expensive for Melville and brought up on the verge of bankruptcy. Because of this Melville involved himself in insolvency proceedings in 1838 and sold The Tasmanian and The Trumpeter to Maurice Smith and John Macdougall respectively; the next year he passed the Colonial Times onto Macdougall. Upon giving on his career as a pressman, Melville retired to his manor, Murray Hall, in New Norfolk; and pursued studies in occult philosophy, astronomy and Freemasonry, it was here that he set about working on his next major work Veritas, a work that involved these pursuits.

In 1843 Melville was engaged in controversy revolving around the movement of Lalande's comet and between 1845 and 1848 Melville was briefly employed as a column writer for the Colonial Times. By 1847 his agricultural pursuits had become a financial embarrassment and in 1849 he left Tasmania, visiting other cities and fulfilling journalistic assignments before arriving in London where he published and commentary on the politics of the Australian colonies entitled, The Present State of Australia, with Particular Hints to Emigrants in 1851.

His last years were devoted to the investigation of occultism and, after years of infirmity and a brief period of sickness, died on the 22 December 1873. The next year his occult work on the lost mysteries of Freemasonry, Veritas, was published posthumously by Frederick Tennyson.

Henry Melville Crescent, in the Canberra suburb of Gilmore, is named in his honour.
