= Sydney Jim =

English convict in Australia (1816–1858)

William Thornton (1816 – 29 September 1858), alias Sydney Jim, was an English convict who was transported to the penal colony of New South Wales in 1836. He was later transferred to Tasmania, where he escaped and, in 1858, formed part of the colony's last bushranging gang. After committing numerous raids and robberies across Tasmania, he was killed in a shootout with the police.

== Life ==
=== Convict years ===
Thornton was born in Shropshire, England in 1816. On 1 March 1836, he was convicted at Salop Quarter Sessions of stealing sheep and received a sentence of transportation for seven years to the penal colony of New South Wales. He arrived in Sydney aboard the convict ship Prince George on 8 May 1837. After his arrival, Thornton absconded multiple times, receiving corporal punishment for his offenses.

In 1843, Thornton escaped into the bush and was later caught with firearms. He was sent to Van Diemen's Land (Tasmania) later that year, but soon escaped again, only to be quickly recaptured. In 1844, he escaped and, after committing robberies, was captured and convicted. He made other attempts to escape, including an incident in which he was involved in a mutiny on the Governor Philip in 1845.

In 1852, Thornton, now classified as an incorrigible offender, was sent to the satellite penal station of Norfolk Island, where he attempted to escape by stealing a boat. He was then assigned to hard labor before being sent back to Tasmania in 1853. Although he worked for local landowners, Thornton never received a ticket of leave, and in 1855, he once again fled into the bush.

=== Bushranging ===
By early 1858, Thornton, going by the alias Sydney Jim, had formed a bushranging gang with escaped convicts Daniel Stewart (alias Wingy), William Ferns (alias Flowers), and Peter Haley (alias Black Peter). Initially operating in the West Coast district, the gang moved into the Central Highlands, where they bailed up travelers and properties in and around Hamilton, Bothwell and other localities, causing widespread fear and alarm.

Throughout 1858, police parties from Hobart and elsewhere tried to hunt down the bushrangers, and on one occasion engaged them in a shootout during which one constable was wounded. Black Peter and Flowers were captured in George Town while attempting to flee to the coast. Thornton and Wingy remained at large until 29 September, when they were tracked down at a secluded hut on the Pine Tier in the Marlborough district. A small group of police officers, including Sergeant Mclvor and Constables Shaw and Waller, were tipped off about the pair's hideout and set a trap to ambush them. When Thornton and Wingy arrived, a gunfight ensued. Thornton was fatally shot and stabbed with a bayonet. Wingy, meanwhile, was shot in the arm and captured.

Thornton's body was later transported to Hamilton, where an inquest was held. Wingy was taken to Hobart, where he was imprisoned alongside Black Peter and Flowers. They were later convicted and hanged, marking the end of organised gang bushranging in Tasmania.

== Legacy ==
In her 1925 book Bushrangers: Reminiscences of Early Tasmania, May J Nichols includes an account of Thornton and his gang bailing up her family home at Bothwell. Nichols also wrote about Thornton for the British monthly The Wide World Magazine.

Bartlett Adamson covered Thornton's bushranging career in the article "Sydney Jim Pays a Visit", published in Smith's Weekly in 1940.

== Bibliography ==
- Harris, Steve (2018). Solomon's Noose: The True Story of Her Majesty's Hangman of Hobart. Melbourne Books. ISBN 9780702235757.
