= The Bushrangers (Burn play) =

- Original language: English
- Written by: David Burn
- Subject: bushrangers
- Genre: melodrama
- Setting: Tasmania

Premiere
- Date: September 8, 1829
- Place: Caledonian Theatre, Ebinburgh

The Bushrangers is an 1829 Australian play by David Burn. It was the first Australian written play with a local background. It was based on the life of Tasmanian bushranger Matthew Brady.

The play was never published in Burn's lifetime (unlike his other plays), possibly because it parodied Lt Governor Arthur. However a copy survived in the Mitchell Library and the play was performed in Edinburgh in 1829.

According to writer Margaret Williams " At the time Burn wrote his play there was no theatrical profession in Australia. And when it did emerge in Sydney three years after The Bushrangers was staged in Edinburgh it was in circumstances that made it unlikely, if not impossible, that a play of such pointed first-hand social observation would be performed."

It is not to be confused with the 1834 play The Bushrangers or the 1854 play The Bushranger, or the Last Crime.

The play was published in book for in 1971, the year the play was first performed in Australia (at a high school). A reviewer said "I think it is unlikely to find many serious producers. It has the one merit of melodrama; it moves along at a spanking pace. Apart from this its interest lies in being a local example of a regrettable period in the history of drama."

Leslie Rees said "While the standard of writing and characterization is not high, The Bushrangers nevertheless shows an advance in local truth on Van Dieman’s Land. Burn failed to use a fraction of the exciting events provided by the real Brady’s career, but he appeared to want to give, as well as an adventurous tale, a semi-factual record of life in the new colony—the trials of new settlers and so on. This would account for the very diffuse arrangement of the minor scenes."

According to Margaret Williams "The play combines, with a surprisingly sure touch, the traditions of romantic drama with astute observation of the details of Tasmanian life in the 1820s."

== Premise ==
Some convicts in Tasmania escape and one becomes a bushranger.

== See also ==
- The Mock Catalani in Little Puddleton
- Fleeced
