= John Crowder (Lord Mayor of London) =

English alderman

John Crowder (1757 – 2 December 1830) was an English printer, alderman of the ward of Farringdon Within, and Lord Mayor of London.

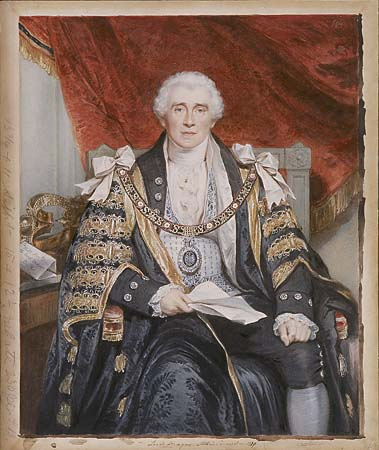
John Crowder in 1829 when he was appointed Lord Mayor of London

== Early life ==
John Crowder was born circa March 1757 in Wraysbury, Buckinghamshire (now part of Berkshire). He was the eldest son of John Crowder, of Wraysbury, who was a paper maker and maker of playing cards, and Frances Jarman. He was baptised on 17th March 1757 at Wraysbury.

== Career as a printer ==
He served his apprenticeship to a printer, and at the expiration of his time, went to London, and obtained a situation in his majesty's printing office, then under the control of William Strahan.

About 1780, he obtained an engagement in the printing office of Francis Blyth, printer and part proprietor of the Public Ledger, a daily morning paper, and the London Packet, an evening paper, published three times a week. Both these papers had been for some years supported by the productions of Goldsmith, Kelly, and others. This engagement, in which Crowder took a very active part, continued until 1787, the time of Blyth's death, when Crowder, who the year before had married Blyth's niece, Mary Annabella James (died 6 November 1823), succeeded to the management of the whole concern. This he carried on for upwards of thirty years. During this period, was frequently employed in printing valuable works for the booksellers.

== Public office ==
He finally left the business in 1820, when he had amassed a considerable fortune by some successful speculations. Residing, as he had during almost the whole of his life, in the ward of Farringdon Within, most notably at 12 Warwick Square, off Warwick Lane, he was, in 1800, elected one of their representatives in the common council, afterwards became one of their deputies, (this ward had two) and on the death of Thomas Smith, esq. was elected alderman on 1 May 1823. In 1825 he was elected sheriff by the livery at large. On his retirement from the shrievalty, he continued to perform the duties of alderman. On 9 November 1829 he entered on his mayoralty, and in the same year, served as Master of the Company of Stationers.

== Illness and death ==
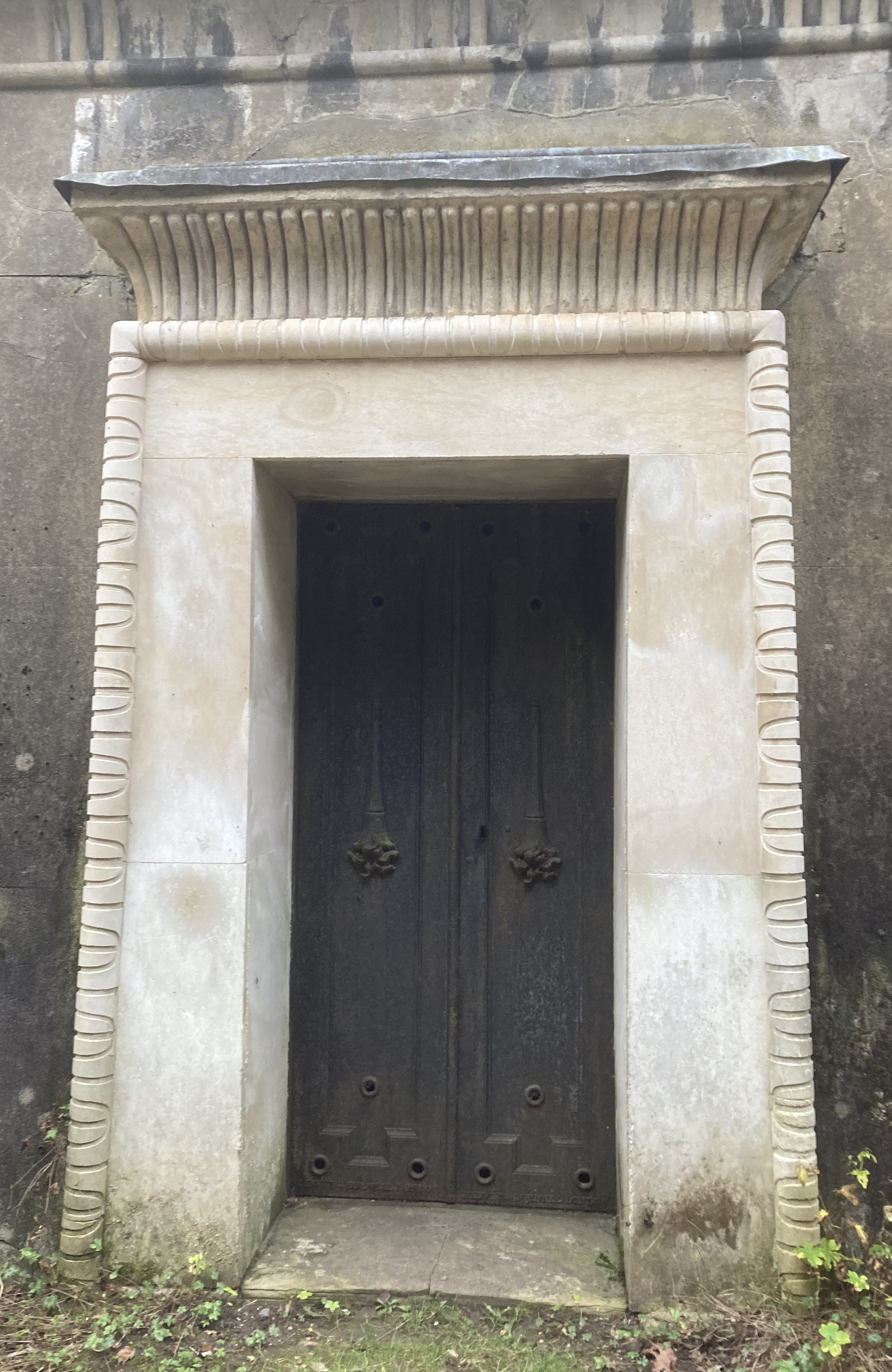
Grave of John Crowder in the Lebanon Circle in Highgate Cemetery

In mid-September 1830 his health became slowly but seriously affected. On 9 November 1830 he was removed in a very feeble state to his house at Hammersmith, where he lingered till 2 December, when he died, in his seventy fourth year. His remains were interred in the parish church of Christchurch, Newgate-street. His brother, James Pecholier Crowder, died at Stockwell Common two days before the Alderman.

In 1865 his daughter, Rosetta Waddell (nee Crowder), had his remains reinterred in a family vault in the Lebanon Circle on the western side of Highgate Cemetery.
