= The Bushrangers =

- Original language: English
- Written by: Henry Melville
- Subject: bushrangers
- Genre: Melodrama

Premiere
- Date: 29 May 1834
- Place: Argyle Rooms, Hobart

The Bushrangers; or Norwood Vale is an 1834 Australian stage play by Henry Melville. It was the first play with an Australian theme to be published and staged in Australia.

It is not to be confused with the 1829 play The Bushrangers by David Burn. According to Margare Williams, the plays "belong to two very different studies of the bushranging subject, and the immigrant Melville’s is, surprisingly, the less specific of the two. It has about as simple a melodramatic plot as it would be possible to find and seems to confirm the author’s description of it in his foreword to the published text as ‘a theatrical piece, introducing a few Colonial characters’."

== History ==
The play was printed in Hobart Town Magazine in April 1834. It was staged in Hobart the following month and in Launceston during November.

It marked the earliest appearance of blackface in an Australian play as a white actor, wearing blackface, played an Aboriginal character known only as 'Native' and 'Blacky'. This character also spoke in whiny broken English, designed to sound like Aboriginal English.

Leslie Rees observed "the play was divided into three acts with thirteen scenes, but on paper it scarcely seemed longer than a one-act play, a series of tableaux with running comments." The play was written relatively quickly. Richard Fotheringham argues "much of this brief play is conventional in character and plot, but its colonial setting and staging lend even its trite and predictable elements an unexpected interest."

== Premise ==
A party of bushrangers plot an attack on the bush home of a settler, Norwood, who has a daughter Marian. The settler is saved by his daughter’s lover, Frederick Seymour, previously turned down by the father, and by an Aboriginal, Murrahwa.

== See also ==
- Life in Sydney; or, The Ran Dan Club
- The House That Jack Built (1869 play)
- The Kelly Gang
- For the Term of His Natural Life
- For 60,000 pounds
- Hazard; or, Pearce Dyceton's Crime
- The South-Sea Sisters: A Lyric Masque
- Arabin; or, The Adventures of a Settler

== Bibliography ==
- Fotheringham, Richard, ed. (2006). Australian Plays for the Colonial Stage : 1834-1899. University of Queensland Press. pp. 3–39.
- The Bushranger Fortitude Valley, Queensland: Playlab, 2013.
