= David Burn =

Tasmanian pioneer and dramatist (c.1799–1875)

- Born: c. 1799; Scotland
- Died: 14 June 1875; Auckland, New Zealand
- Occupation: Dramatist

David Burn (c.1799 – 14 June 1875) was a Scottish-born Tasmanian pioneer and dramatist, author of the first Australian drama to be performed on stage, The Bushrangers. He has been called Australia's first playwright.

== Early life ==
Burn was born in Scotland, the son of David Burn and his wife, Jacobina, née Hunter (1763–1851). David Burn senior died c.1820 and Jacobina emigrated to Van Diemen's Land (now Tasmania) and became the first woman there to have land granted to her. David junior had a brief career in the navy, joining his mother in Van Diemen's Land in 1826. He failed to qualify for a land grant and returned to Edinburgh in 1829, divorcing his wife there.

== Career ==
In 1830 Burn returned to Van Diemen's Land and revisited England with his mother in 1836.

He contributed a serial in the Colonial Magazine of 1840-1841, Van Diemen's Land, which has been reprinted in book form in 1973 as A Picture of Van Diemen's Land. Burn published a pamphlet Vindication of Van Diemen's Land in A Cursory Glance at Her Colonists as They Are, Not as They Have Been Represented To Be (London, 1840).

In 1842 he visited Port Arthur penal colony and its cemetery, Isle of the Dead.

Burn accompanied Sir John and Lady Jane Franklin on their expedition to the west coast of Tasmania in 1842 which was described in his Narrative of the Overland Journey … From Hobart Town to Macquarie Harbour, 1842 (published in Sydney 1955 with notes by G. Mackaness).

== Death and legacy ==
He had two children and was married twice.

== Bibliography ==
=== Novels ===
- The Convict Land, or, Men, Manners, and Matters at the Antipodes, 1843
- L'Independencia : A Tale of Brazil, 1843

=== Poetry ===
- Albert, or, The Exile: A Poem in Three Cantos, 1843

=== Drama ===
- The Bushrangers, 1929
- Plays, and Fugitive Pieces, in Verse, 1842
- Sydney Delivered; or, The Princely Buccaneer, 1845
- The Queen's Love, 1845

=== Non-fiction ===
- Vindication of Van Diemen's Land : in a cursory glance at her colonists as they are, not as they have been represented to be, 1840
- A Picture of Van Diemen's Land, 1841
- An Excursion to Port Arthur in 1842, 1842
- Narrative of the Overland Journey of Sir John and Lady Franklin and Party from Hobart Town to Macquarie Harbour, 1843
