= Colonial Times =

19th century newspaper in Tasmania

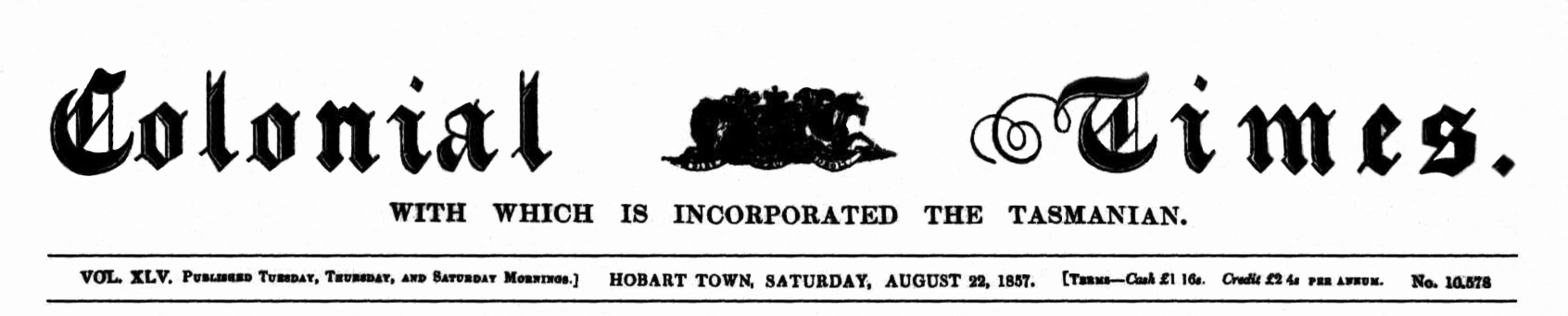
- Masthead of the last issue of the Colonial Times, 22 August 1857 ________
- Type: Thrice-weekly newspaper
- Editor: Andrew Bent
- Founded: 1825
- Ceased publication: 1857
- Language: English
- Headquarters: Hobart

The Colonial Times was a newspaper in what is now the Australian state of Tasmania. It was established as the Colonial Times, and Tansamanian Advertisement in 1825 in Hobart, Van Diemen's Land (Note: Van Diemen's Land became the colony of Tasmania in 1856.) by the former editor of the Hobart Town Gazette, and Van Diemen's Land Advertiser, Andrew Bent. The name was changed to Colonial Times in 1828. In 1857 the title was absorbed into the Hobart Town Mercury.
