= Martin Cash =

Australian bushranger

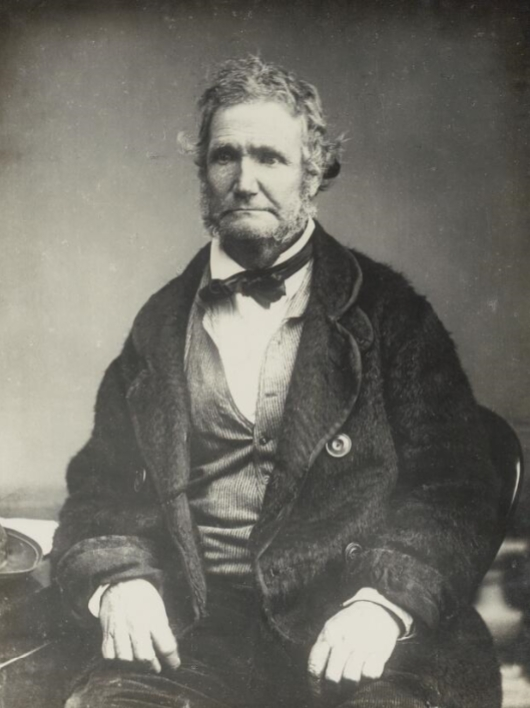
- Born: 1808; Enniscorthy, County Wexford, Ireland
- Died: 26 August 1877; Glenorchy, Tasmania, Australia
- Spouse: Mary Bennett (1824–1879)
- Children: Martin Cash (1855–1871)

Martin Cash (baptised 10 October 1808 – 26 August 1877) was a notorious Irish-Australian convict bushranger, known for escaping twice from Port Arthur, Van Diemen's Land. His 1870 autobiography, The Adventures of Martin Cash, ghostwritten by James Lester Burke, also a former convict, became a best seller in Australia.

== Biography ==
Born in Enniscorthy, County Wexford, Ireland, Cash was brought up in a wealthy family and was literate.

When he was 18 years old, he became acquainted with a young woman from Enniscorthy who earned a living by making straw hats and bonnets.She and her family borrowed money from him, until his mother stopped him as this extravagance was rapidly draining her resources. Subsequently, he became involved in an event which changed the whole course of his life.

His memoirs describe that, in a jealous rage, he shot at a man named Jessop for making advances to the above-mentioned young lady. Cash was sentenced to seven years penal transportation, and he left Cork Harbour on board the Marquis of Huntly with 170 other convicts. They arrived in Sydney Town on 10 February 1828.

=== In New South Wales ===
Cash was "assigned" to Mr G. Bowman of Richmond, who leased other farms on the Hunter River, where Martin was transferred, and where he became a stockrider for nine years.

John Boodle, who had a station on Liverpool Plains, asked Cash to assist him and his brother to brand some cattle which, unknown to Cash, had been stolen. While the branding was in progress two strangers came along, remained a few minutes, and departed. Upon Boodle informing him that the strangers knew the cattle were stolen, and that transportation to Norfolk Island was the penalty for this crime, Cash decided to leave for Van Diemen's Land. He sailed in the barque Francis Freeling for Hobart Town, and arrived on 10 February 1837.

=== In Tasmania ===
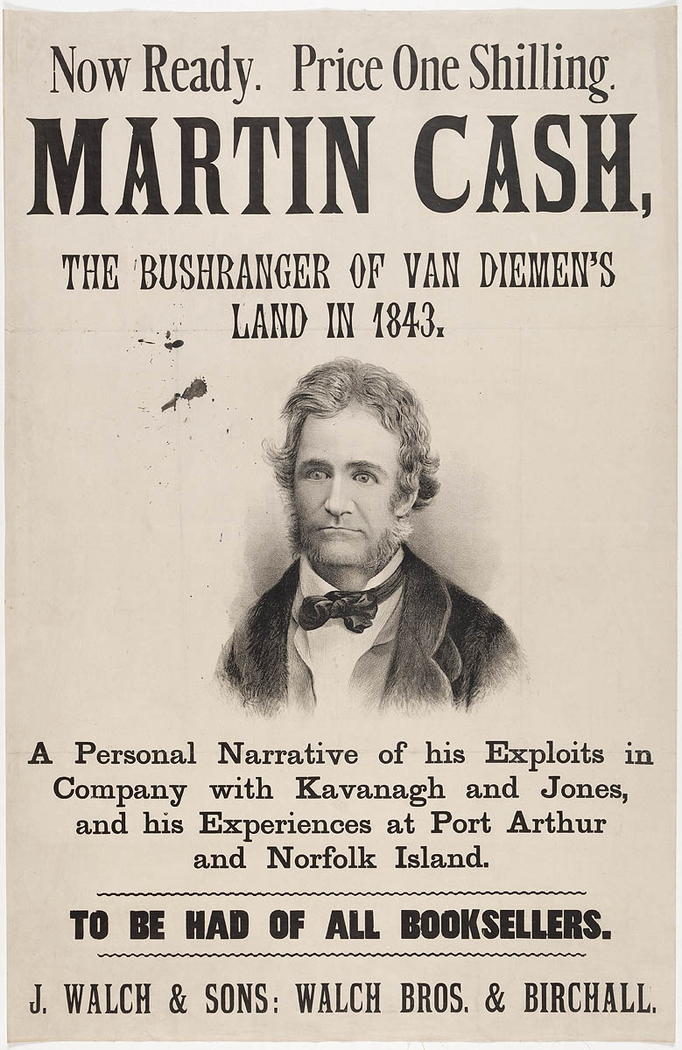
Martin Cash, The Bushranger of Van Diemen's Land in 1843

In Van Diemen's Land, Cash eventually came before John Giles Price, a magistrate at Hobart Town, who sentenced him to two years in addition to his original seven years' sentence, and to four years' imprisonment with hard labour at Port Arthur. He briefly escaped and 18 months was added to his time. Again he escaped, and almost made it across the Bass Strait with his partner Bessie, but was caught and faced ten years at Port Arthur, the so-called escape proof colony. His first attempt at escape from Port Arthur failed. However, he managed to swim across the purportedly shark-infested Eaglehawk Neck, the first person to do so. This experience would later prove useful as it earned him much respect from other prisoners.

On Boxing Day 1842 Cash, George Jones and Lawrence Kavenagh absconded from a work party. Hiding in dense scrub land and with little food they made their way 15 kilometres (9.3 mi) to the neck. Swimming with their clothes tied in bundles above their heads, they made the other side, all three of them having lost their bundles. Now naked the trio robbed a road gang's hut for clothing, and began an eight-month spree of bushranging, robbing mail coaches, homesteads and inns.

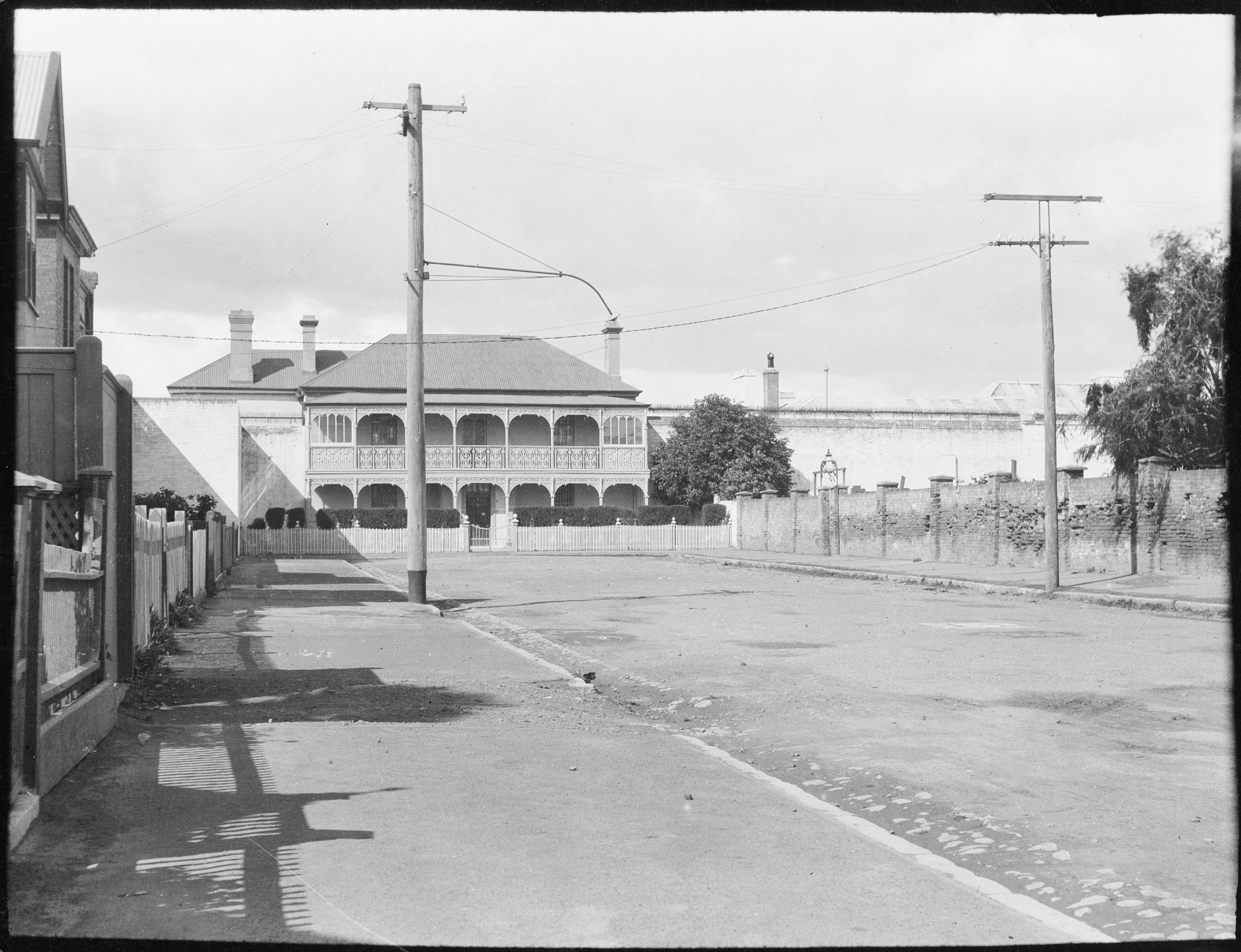
Residence of the Governor of the Hobart Gaol, at the end of Melville Street, known colloquially as Martin's Mistake. (c.1905)

The three became known as Cash and Co and their reputation grew, however in August 1843 Cash discovered his partner Bessie was with another man in Hobart. Enraged, Cash swore to kill them both and he made his way to Hobart. On 29 August 1843 he was spotted in Brisbane Street, Hobart, near the Old Commodore Inn, running down Argyle Street, Cash turned into Melville Street heading towards the Domain and escape, unaware that it was a dead end. Until the demolition of the Campbell Street Gaol, this dead end was colloquially known as Martin's Mistake. A gunfight ensued and Constable Peter Winstanley was shot by Cash and died two days later. Cash was trialled for murder in September 1843. Cash was found guilty and sentenced to death by hanging by Chief Justice Algernon Montagu, but a last minute reprieve saw him sentenced to transportation for life at Norfolk Island.

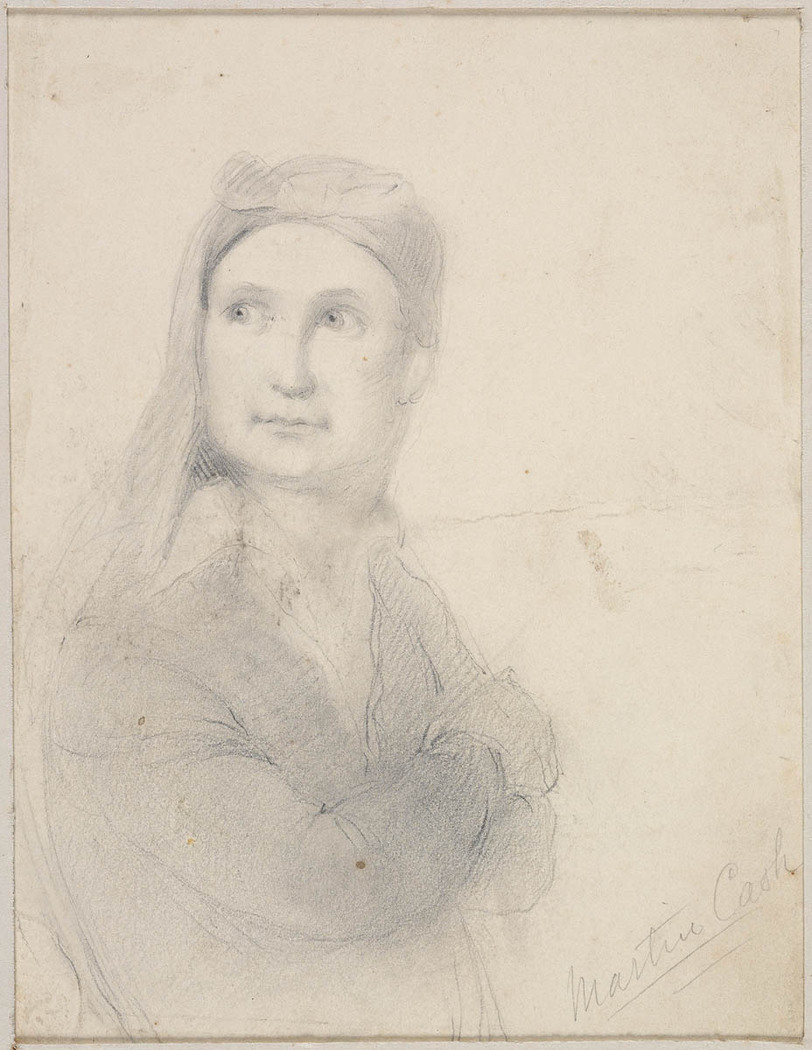
Portrait of bush-ranger Martin Cash, 1823-1843, by Thomas Bock, from original pencil sketch, PXE 5, f.3

=== In Norfolk Island ===
There he eventually became a trustee, and later a constable. He married in 1854, and was granted his ticket of leave later that year. Between 1854 and 1856, he was an overseer in the Royal Hobart Botanical Gardens. They had one child, a son, Martin born in 1855. Subsequently, he travelled to Christchurch, New Zealand, where he kept several brothels, in 1860 and became a free man in 1863.[source?]

=== Return to Tasmania ===
Cash died in his bed in his farm cottage, now on Montrose Road, Glenorchy in 1877. He is one of the few bushrangers to die of old age. During the late 1860s he had dictated his autobiography to an amanuensis, James Lester Burke. This account, although often embellished, provides an insight into convict life. Buck and Joan Emberg later transcribed this account from the original manuscript and released it as The Uncensored Story of Martin Cash.

== Popular culture ==
He was the subject of

- the radio series Outlawry Under the Gums (1933)
- the stage play Cash (1972) by Michael Boddy and Marcus Cooney
- the Frank Clune book Martin Cash
- the radio play Shadows Alive

== See also ==
- List of convicts transported to Australia

== Bibliography ==
- "Trial of Martin Cash".
- "Martin Cash – Tasmanian Bushranger". Archived from the original on 2 September 2005.
- "Bushranger Profiles: Martin Cash". Archived from the original on 18 November 2005.
- "Dictionary of New Zealand Biography: Martin Cash".
- Serle, Percival (1949). "Cash, Martin". Dictionary of Australian Biography. Sydney: Angus & Robertson.
