= George Jones (bushranger) =

English bushranger (c. 1815–1844)

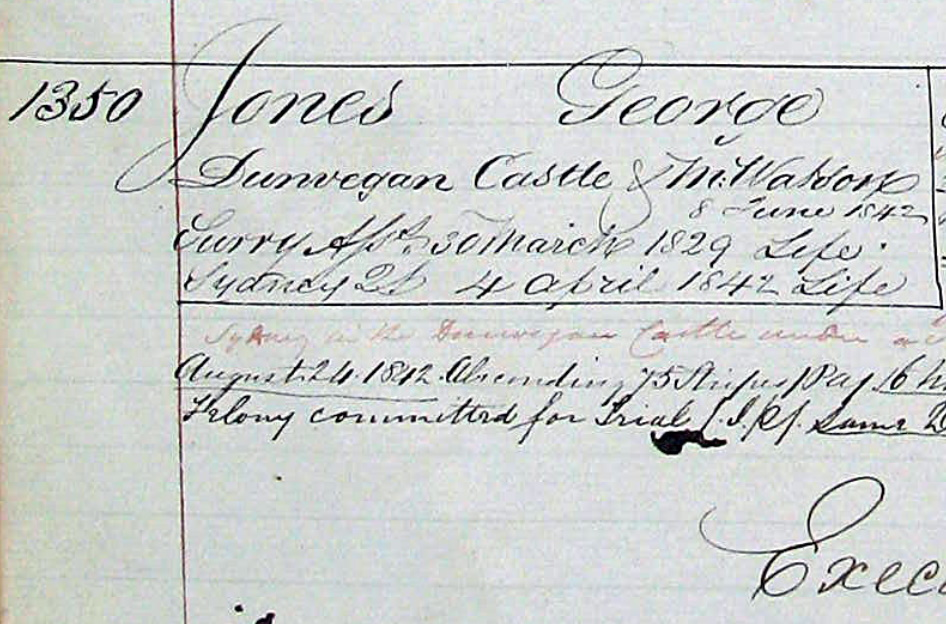
- Detail from George Jones' convict record (pertaining to his transportation to Van Diemen's Land in June 1842).
- Born: c. 1815; London, England
- Died: 30 April 1844; Hobart, Tasmania
- Occupation: Bushranger
- Conviction: Armed robbery
- Penalty: Execution

George Jones (c. 1815 – 30 April 1844) was a convict bushranger who, with Martin Cash and Lawrence Kavenagh, escaped from Port Arthur, Van Diemen's Land, in late 1842. The three men took to bushranging for a six-month period, robbing homesteads and inns with seeming impunity. After Kavenagh and Cash were captured, Jones remained at large for a further seven months, committing a number of robberies in company with two other escaped convicts. In April 1844 he was captured in a shoot-out with police, convicted and executed.

== Biography ==
=== Early life and transportation ===
George Jones was born circa 1815 in London, England. By 1829 Jones was employed as an errand boy, living in London.

On 20 March 1829, Jones, aged about fourteen years, was tried at the Surrey Assizes for robbing a till and sentenced to transportation for life. Jones was transported to New South Wales aboard the Dunvegan Castle with 179 other convicts, arriving in Sydney on 13 March 1830. On arrival he was assigned to Richard Lang on the Hunter River in the Newcastle district.

=== Servitude and highway robbery ===
Jones’ convict record indicates occasional bouts of resentful disobedience. In June 1833 he received twenty-five lashes for "stealing grapes". In May 1835 he received fifty lashes for disobedience and the following September, one hundred lashes for "refusal and neglect of duty". In March 1837 Jones was given fifty lashes for absconding. By 1841 George Jones was assigned to Captain John Pike of 'Pickering' farm near Merton, who was known as a harsh master whose convict servants were kept under deplorable conditions. Jones absconded from his service on 25 May 1841, remaining at large for eight months. While he was at large, Jones teamed up with another escaped convict, an older man with a variety of tattoos named Joseph Bowers. Bowers had been assigned to William Blaxland of Cassillis from whose service he absconded in June 1841.

In the early afternoon of 17 January 1842 two men, John Lucas, superintendent of Buchanan’s 'Marsheen' run beyond Muswellbrook, and a man named Cotterell, were riding on the road about nine miles from Maitland when they were bailed up by George Jones and Joseph Bowers, each of them brandishing double-barrelled guns. They compelled the men to dismount and took them about forty yards into the bush. The bushrangers took what little money the pair had, and kept them captive until nightfall. Before they were released Lucas was handed back five shillings "to pay for his bed", and both men had their horses returned to them.

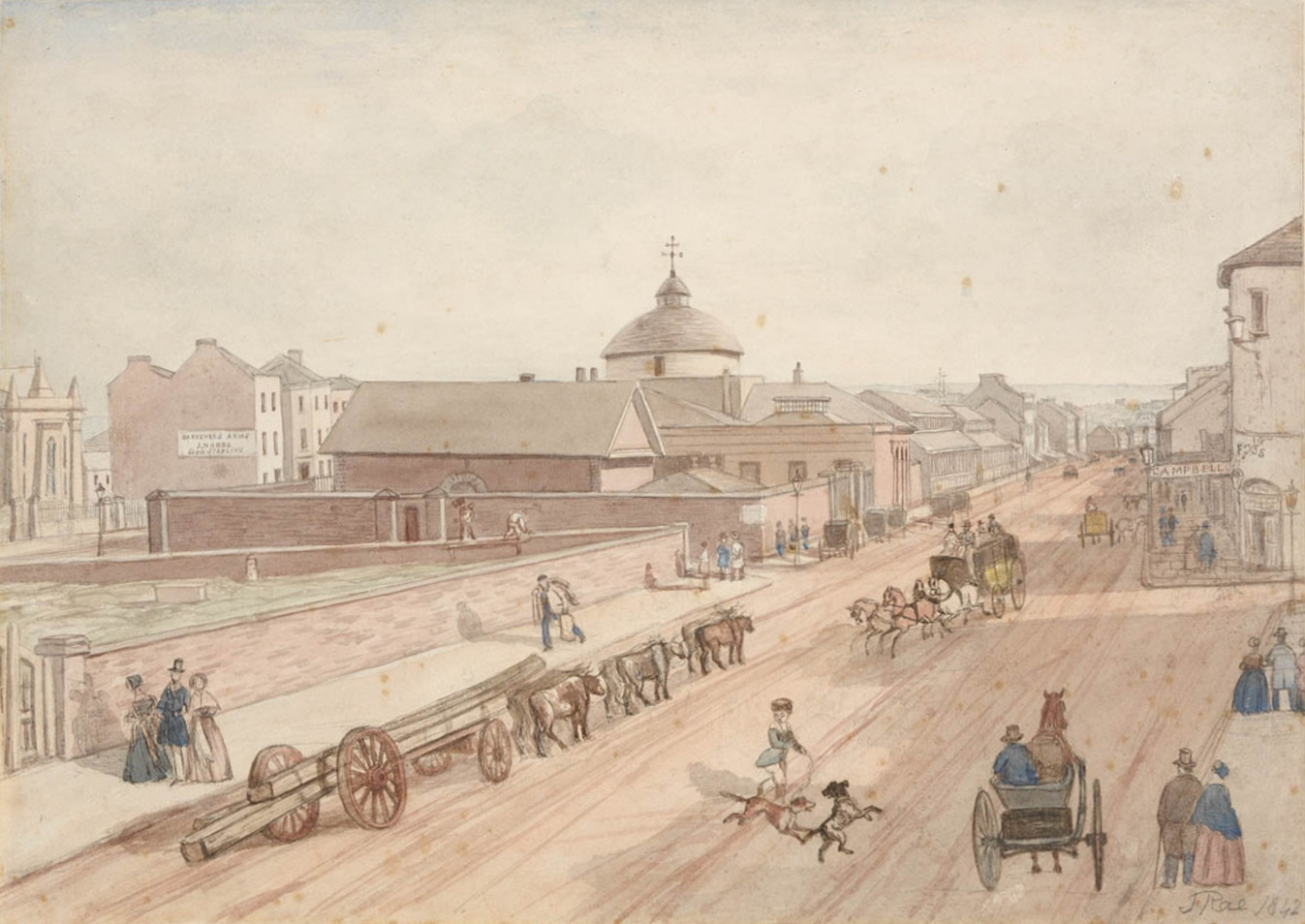
George Street, Sydney, looking north (a painting by John Rae dated 1842); the dome of the Police Office can be seen, where George Jones unwisely agreed to go in order to get a cheque cashed.

The following morning the mail-cart travelling from Muswellbrook to Singleton was bailed up by Jones and Bowers. The cart was ascending a hill near Maidswater Creek, midway between the townships, when the two men emerged from the thick scrub with double-barrelled guns. They took the mail and their two captives (the driver and a passenger) into the bush back from the road and proceeded to cut up the mail-bags and open letters, during which process they were reported to be “very merry and jocular”. Afterwards the bushrangers prepared some pots of tea which they shared with their prisoners, before fetching their horses and riding off. The driver of the mail-cart recognised one of the bushrangers as someone who had participated in an earlier robbery of the same mail.

On Monday, January 24, George Jones walked into a Commercial Bank in Sydney Town soon after it had opened and presented a cheque to be cashed. The bank officer informed Jones that he would need to accompany him to the Police Office in order for Jones to account for how the cheque came into his possession. Jones agreed to do so; at the Central Police Office “having told a made-up story and given an assumed name” he was directed to make an affidavit. Certain details in the affidavit aroused suspicions in Police Magistrate Windeyer and he ordered that the man be detained. A search of his person revealed thirty bank cheques and orders totalling about £171, which he admitted were taken from the stolen letters from the Muswellbrook mail-bag. When asked why he had dared to go into the Police Office, Jones replied that “he knew it was neck or nothing, and if he did not get the cheques and orders cashed, there was no use in doing the job”.

In late January Constable Lynch apprehended Joseph Bowers in Castlereagh Street in Sydney, on suspicion of being "a runaway". Jones and Bowers were committed for trial at the Hyde Park Barracks court. In late February, in what was obviously a formality, their tickets-of-leave were cancelled.

At the Sydney Court of Quarter Sessions on Monday, 4 April 1842, the escaped convicts, Joseph Bowers and George Jones, were indicted on charges of highway and mail robbery and being illegally at large with firearms in their possession. They were identified by John Lucas as the pair who had stopped and robbed him on January 17 on the Maitland Road. Both men were found guilty, and sentenced to transportation to a penal settlement for life. On 30 May 1842 George Jones, along with forty-two other prisoners of the Crown (including Joseph Bowers and Lawrence Kavenagh), was transported from Sydney to Van Diemen’s Land aboard the schooner Marian Watson, arriving at Hobart on June 8, from where he and Kavenagh were taken to the Port Arthur penal settlement.

=== Escape from Port Arthur ===
Towards the end of 1842, while in a work gang carting stone from the Port Arthur quarry, Jones and Lawrence Kavenagh met Martin Cash. Jones had previously heard of Cash, who had been an assigned convict to George Bowman, a landholder near Muswellbrook and neighbour to Captain Pike (although Cash had left the district before Jones had been assigned to Pike's farm). The three convicts had a common interest: “a strong inclination to abscond”. Cash had made a previous attempt at escaping from Port Arthur, being captured within a mile of the mainland near East Bay Neck. They discussed a plan of escape, and agreed to make the attempt on the afternoon of Boxing Day as the carts came up to the quarry for the first load.

On Boxing Day, 26 December 1842, the escape occurred as planned. In Martin Cash’s words: “I walked deliberately over to where [Kavenagh and Jones] were at work; fixing my eyes on them for a moment, they both instantly dropped their picks, and springing on a steep bank, were lost in a minute in the scrub, I soon following their example”. Kavenagh took the lead, directing the others to where he had previously stashed a quarter of a loaf and some flour. Then the three convicts headed for the thick scrub at the foot of Mount Arthur. They decided to remain hidden in the bush for the next three days, expecting that the soldiers “would relax in their vigilance, under the impression that we had made our escape”.

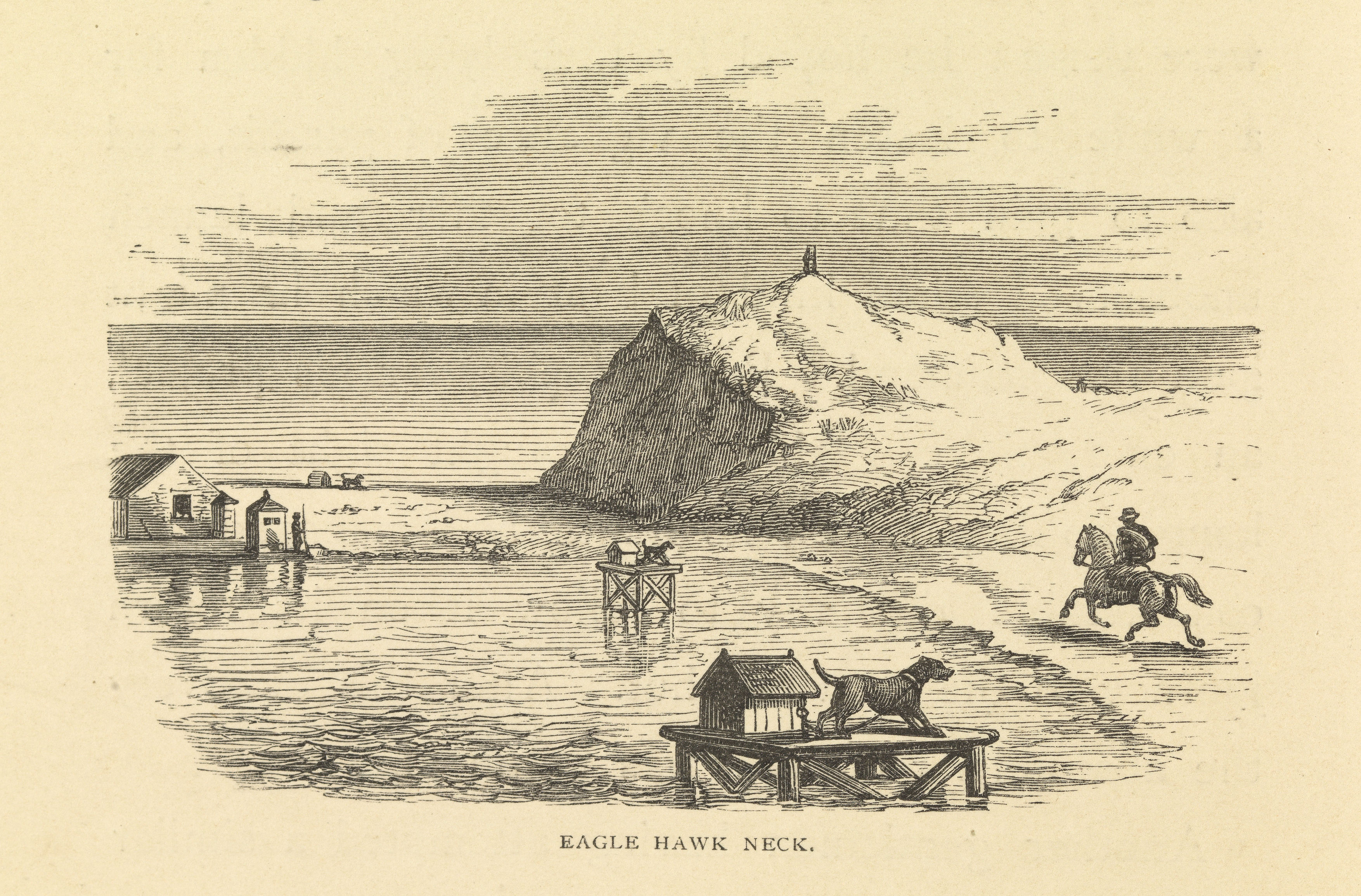
An image of Eaglehawk Neck (published in 1872), showing Pirates Bay in the background and, in the foreground, guard-dogs chained on platforms surrounded by water in the much narrower Eaglehawk Bay.

On the night of their third day of freedom they left their hiding place, keeping to the bush and flanking the coastline to their right. Near Long Bay they crossed a road and continued north-west through the bush to the side of Signal Hill, where they rested until morning. Cash made a "charcoal fire" in a hollow tree and cooked a damper for breakfast. The three convicts continued on through the thick scrub until dusk when they came in sight of Eaglehawk Neck where they could “see the line literally swarming with constables and prisoners”. Realising that crossing the Neck was impossible they decided to swim past it.

Eaglehawk Neck is a narrow isthmus connecting the Tasman Peninsula (where Port Arthur was located) with the Forestier Peninsula. Across the neck were placed guards, lamps and chained guard-dogs, some of them on stages set out in the water. To the west of the Neck was the narrow Eaglehawk Bay and on the eastern side was the much wider expanse of Pirates Bay. Following Cash's lead the escapees chose the longer swim on the eastern side, about half a mile in width and the same route that Cash had taken on his first escape attempt. Moving stealthily through the bush in darkness they reached the water-line along the arc of Pirates Bay and started swimming with their clothes bundled above their heads. With a strong wind blowing, waves crashed against the swimmers and carried away their bundles, so each of the men arrived naked on the other side.

Finding themselves at the base of steep and scrubby hill the three convicts advanced up the slope and rested near the top until daybreak. Martin Cash knew of the location of a hut near the road connecting Eaglehawk Neck and East Bay Neck, normally occupied by a road-repair gang who had nearly completed their sentences. In their naked state and without shoes or food, the three convicts decided to take the risk of raiding the hut. They rushed through the door, Kavenagh holding an axe he had found outside, to find it occupied by only one man, the sub-overseer of the work gang. The man was tied to a post and clothes, boots and a quantity of food were procured.

Realising that, upon discovery of their raid on the road-gang’s hut, the focus of those engaged in the pursuit would shift to the Forestier Peninsula and the East Bay Neck, the escapees decided to remain hidden for a few days more. At the northern end of the peninsula they considered swimming to the mainland (which was half the distance of their previous swim), but with a strong current flowing both Kavenagh and Jones expressed disquiet. Kavenagh told the other two “that he had a very narrow escape from drowning when crossing at the Neck, at one time giving himself up for lost, observing that it was nothing short of a miracle that he had reached the land”. Deciding to attempt a crossing by land at East Bay Neck, the three convicts waited for nightfall and, by stealth, managed to evade the sentries and then crawled through a field of wheat until they were a safe distance from the military barracks. A quarter mile further on they came to dense bush where they could momentarily relax, having “escaped the sharks by land and water”.

=== Bushranging ===
Travelling north-west after their escape to the mainland from Port Arthur the three escaped convicts arrived at a bush hut and took bread, tea and sugar (as well as a billy) from the frightened residents. By the following morning they had reached a more populous district in the vicinity of Sorell. Keeping watch on a farmhouse during the day, they emerged at night and forced entry by knocking on the door and calling out “Police” upon enquiry. At that house they found a gun (of which Kavenagh took possession) and a complete change of clothes for each man. At a shepherd’s hut near Prosser Plains the convicts obtained a second gun. Moving further to the north-west, on 23 January 1843 they raided Blinkworth’s house in the Richmond district, where they carried off a double-barrelled gun and food.

By 19 January 1843 a reward had been proclaimed for the apprehension of the three “runaways from Port Arthur”. The reward offered for the apprehension of “either of the said felons” was fifty sovereigns (pounds); if “this service be performed by a convict” a conditional pardon would be granted in addition to the pecuniary reward.

Cash, Kavenagh and Jones next bailed up a public-house near Bagdad, during which one of the men under guard managed to escape while they were searching the premises, necessitating a "speedy retreat" and a resolution to better secure each person in the future. The following morning, now moving south-west towards Broadmarsh, they bailed up Elijah Panton and his family at their farmhouse, causing great distress to Panton’s pregnant wife, Jane. The intruders then secured a group of labourers from an outhouse as well as the household servants, before searching and plundering the contents of the house. After leaving Panton's farm the three bushrangers passed Dr. Macdowell on the road, who claimed he had hailed them and was answered by being fired upon. In the wake of these events Panton, who was a former convict, received a letter from the Colonial Secretary notifying him that "because the bushrangers were allowed to escape from his place, he is to be deprived of all his assigned servants".

=== The Woolpack Inn shoot-out ===
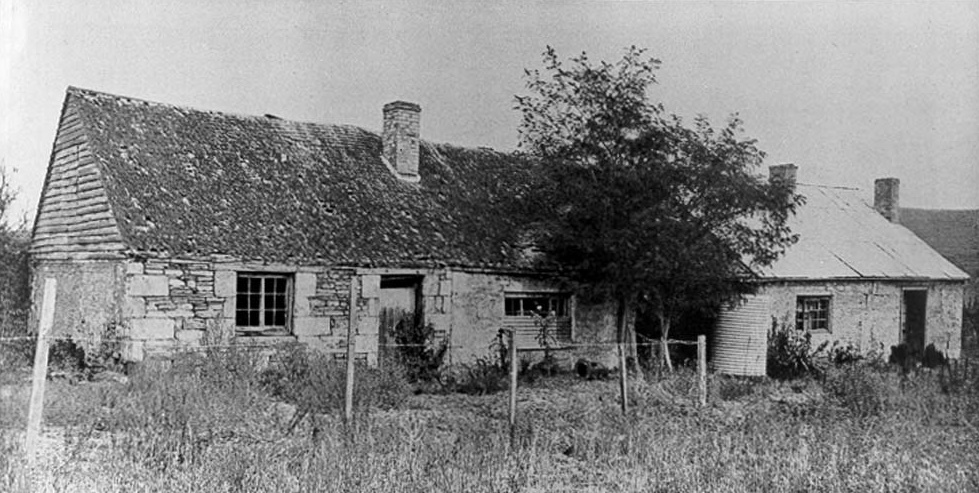
The Woolpack Inn near New Norfolk was built in 1829 and was widely known in the district as the site of a shoot-out between the bushranger Cash (and his two comrades) and four police constables; the photograph was taken in 1920 and the building was demolished in 1936.

On Tuesday evening, 31 January 1843, the three bushrangers arrived at the Woolpack Inn at Macquarie Plains, 12 miles north-west of New Norfolk on the Hamilton Road. They bailed up the publican’s wife, Mrs. Stoddart, her two adult sons and three customers. Cash enquired about a hut about fifty yards from the public-house, and Mrs. Stoddart replied that she “had no men there”. In fact, four police constables were stationed in the hut and they had noticed something was amiss at the hotel. Cash, upon glancing out the window, “perceived some people moving up to the house” and, alerting his comrades, he stepped out of the building and was “told to stand” by the approaching men. On being challenged Cash immediately fired his weapon, and Kavenagh and Jones, standing either side of him, also fired at the constables, two of whom were wounded in the exchange of fire. Each of the policemen then retreated to cover, Cash later claiming they “had behaved in a cowardly manner”. After the smoke cleared Cash found himself standing alone, Kavenagh and Jones having taken the opportunity to escape. Cash returned to the house and grabbed a three-gallon keg of brandy before he too departed, later joining his comrades at the spot where they had previously stashed their swags.

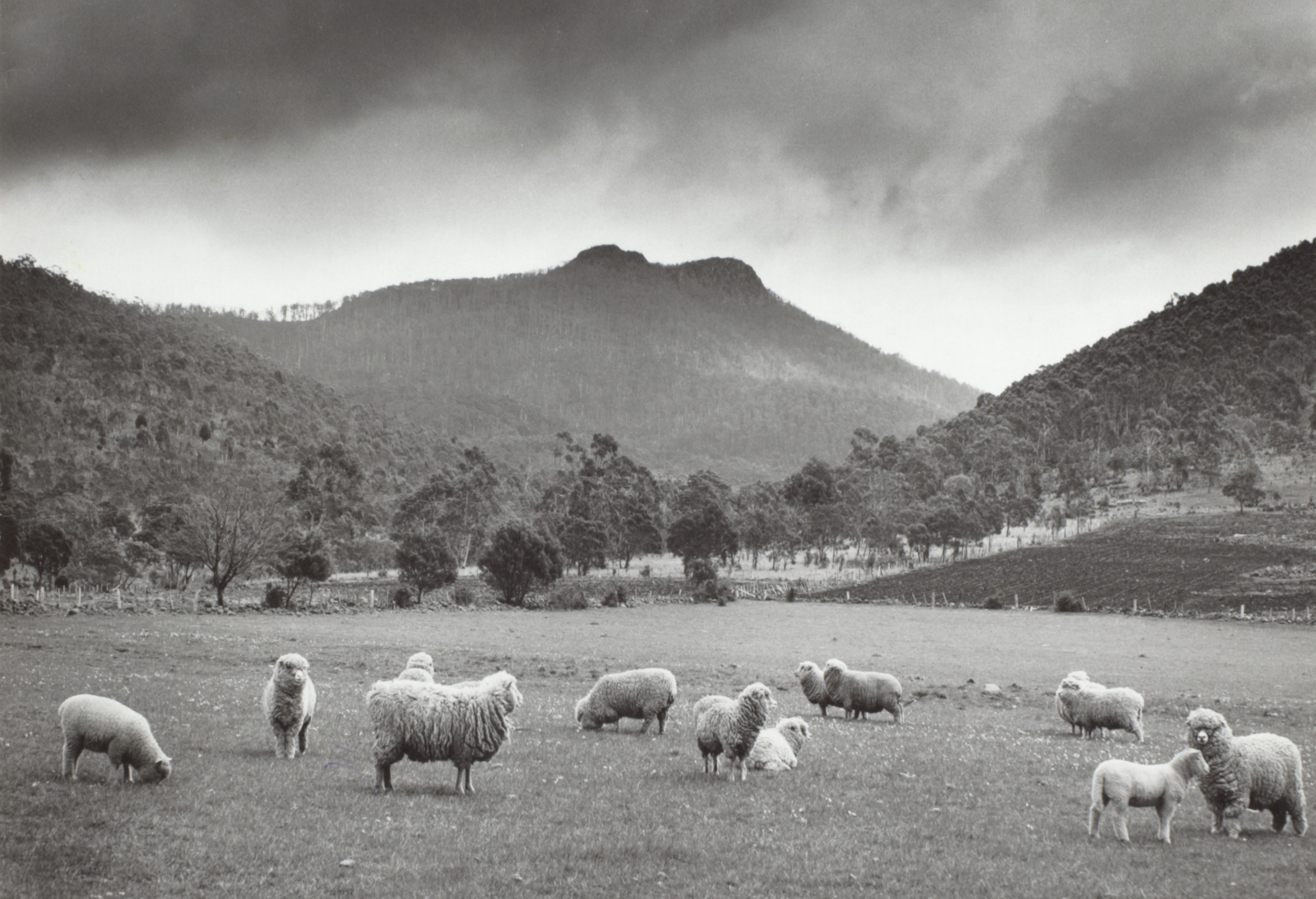
Mount Dromadery in south-east Tasmania, the location of the bushrangers' base-camp (photographed in 1960).

=== Mount Dromadery base-camp ===
After the incident at the Woolpack Inn the three bushrangers travelled for three days towards a base they had previously established at Mount Dromedary (between Brighton and New Norfolk in the Black Hills area). On their way they stopped at Henry Cawthorne’s property at the foot of Mount Dromedary, tying up several men and raiding the house to obtain provisions, as well as a gun and ammunition. Following the raid on Cawthorne’s house it was reported that “the constables and military are in hot pursuit” of the outlaws. By that stage, however, they had decided to lie low, spending the night at the home of old acquaintances of Martin Cash, an ex-convict named Thomas Blackburn and his wife Hannah who were living at Cobb’s Hill (towards the Jordan River). The following day Hannah Blackburn travelled to Hobart Town and returned with Cash's de facto wife, Eliza (after having dodged police surveillance). The three bushrangers, accompanied by Eliza Cash, then repaired to their base-camp on nearby Mount Dromedary.

In his memoir Cash refers to their elevated station as a "fortress", which he named 'Dromedary Park'. Situated near the top of Mount Dromedary it had commanding views of the Derwent River from the New Norfolk district to Brighton, an "airy tenement" where the bushrangers were "not likely to be surprised". The "fortress" consisted of three logs in a triangle shape, on the inside of which was placed branches of young trees and ferns. Though lacking a roof Cash described it as having “rather a comfortable appearance”. Kavenagh, Jones and Cash and his wife spent the next three days “in quiet retirement… enjoying the beauties of nature unadorned by art”. However, with their supplies running low, the bushrangers “resolved to take the field, and levy contributions”, leaving Eliza in charge of the fortress.

=== Brighton and New Norfolk districts ===
On Tuesday, 7 February 1843, the three bushrangers entered the house of Hodgkinson, his wife and eighteen year-old daughter. Jones covered the captives with a double-barrelled gun while Kavenagh searched for food and other supplies and Cash stood outside on watch. Mrs. Hodgkinson proved to be a difficult proposition, verbally abusing the intruders and attempting to escape from the house on several occasions. As the bushrangers were leaving with their plunder, including six dried hams, she followed them outside “screaming at the top of her voice” and continued to lambast them until they were out of sight. On Saturday, February 11, the three men suddenly entered the house at Collis’ farm in the bush near the road to Brighton, 17 miles north of Hobart Town. They were fed mutton and Cape wine by Mrs. Collis, before they locked her, with her young child, in the storeroom and departed with food, clothes and the remainder of the wine.

On Wednesday, February 22, Cash, Kavenagh and Jones stopped four men in a cart near Thomas Shone’s 300-acre property in the Back River district (north-east of New Norfolk). They bound the men and proceeded to the house, where Shone, his wife and a guest were bailed up, each of the outlaws armed with a double-barrel fowling-piece and a brace of pistols. Soon afterwards a spring cart arrived with other members of the household and their guests. Seven men from a nearby hut were also tied up and brought to the house, making a total of nineteen being held captive in one room. After stopping for nearly an hour the bushrangers departed with food and assorted stolen valuables. Thomas Shone was later informed that, for allowing the bushrangers to escape, he too would be deprived of his assigned servants. This decision by the Colonial Secretary became the subject of criticism and ridicule in the colonial press.

On returning with their stolen goods to their Mount Dromedary base-camp, the bushrangers learned that the King’s Own Light Infantry, under command of Major Ainsworth, had been given the task of pursuing them. Several days later, from their elevated position, they watched “several parties of police and military scouring the country” searching for them, “taking all directions but the right one”. Cash urged Eliza to return to Hobart Town, being concerned for her safety. After she had left the three men decided a change in their sphere of activity would be necessary, prompting the bushrangers to relocate further inland and to the north, to the districts around Hamilton.

On 1 March 1843 the colonial Government, in a response to the widespread belief that the bushrangers were being assisted and supported by other convicts, amended the reward offered to a convict for the apprehension of the three “runaways from Port Arthur”. It was announced that any convict “who shall apprehend or give such information as shall lead to the apprehension” of either Cash, Kavenagh or Jones would receive, instead of the previously advertised conditional pardon, a free pardon as well as a free passage from the colony (in addition to the pecuniary reward of fifty sovereigns).

=== Hamilton and Bothwell districts ===
On Saturday, March 11, Cash, Kavenagh and Jones visited the residence of Thomas Triffett at Green Hills on the River Ouse (about 9 miles north-west of Hamilton), robbing it “of everything they could carry away”. They took Triffett’s gun and left behind one they had earlier stolen from Henry Cawthorne, deeming it inferior to the one lately obtained, and asking Triffett to return the gun to Cawthorne (“telling him at the same time, that as soon as they met with a better one than his, they would return it also”).

On Sunday, March 19, the bushrangers arrived at Charles Kerr’s station, ‘Dunrobin’, about 14 miles west of Hamilton. They had been observing the place for two days beforehand, and had taken a shepherd prisoner in order to interrogate him about the place they intended to plunder. They left with a pair of duelling pistols, clothes and a telescope to aid their careful observations of human movement. On the following Wednesday the bushrangers paid a visit to John Sherwin of ‘Sherwood’ station, between Hamilton and Bothwell, an incursion which followed a familiar pattern.

Heading south-east the three bushrangers struck next on March 25 at Thomas Edols’ house at 'The Bluff' at Macquarie Plains (near the Woolpack Inn). On approaching the homestead they were attacked by a large dog which Cash shot. Breaking through the door they found Edols and his family members inside. There were obvious signs of preparation in case of an incursion; the bushrangers found three loaded guns behind a door and a pair of duelling pistols which Edols was attempting to conceal as he sat on the sofa. Edols later provided interesting comparative descriptions of the three men who had robbed him: “Cash is represented as a low-speaking, foul-mouthed man; Kavenagh the most quiet of the three; and Jones the most intelligent”. From as early as February 1843 the colonial newspapers had begun to use the shorthand term ‘Cash & Co.’ to describe the three bushrangers, Cash, Kavenagh and Jones. The term became increasingly common as their exploits increased and they remained at large. Martin Cash was better known in Van Diemen’s Land, having lived on the island since 1837 and gaining considerable notoriety for making two separate escape attempts from Port Arthur. There is, however, some doubt regarding who was the real leader of the gang, with mistaken identity probably playing a part. After Kavenagh was wounded and subsequently captured in July 1843 the Colonial Times newspaper commented” “We have no doubt Cash and Jones will soon be captured – their strength is broken”.

The bushrangers made their next appearance east of Hamilton in the Green Ponds district. On March 29 they arrived at Captain Clark’s ‘Hunting Ground’ farm near Green Ponds township. Finding the house occupied by “three ladies and a woman servant only” they left after only a short time taking only a newspaper and some apples, “fearful that someone… had escaped their hands and gone for assistance”. Later that day the outlaws robbed John Thomson’s house in the same district, turning up a half hour after a party of soldiers and constables had left when they had received a report of the raid upon Captain Clark’s farm.

On Saturday morning, April 15, Cash, Kavenagh and Jones robbed George Stokell’s farmhouse at The Tiers near Mount Jerusalem, north-west of Bothwell. Representing themselves as constables in search of the bushrangers, the overseer Bell “observed he did not think the bushrangers were thereabouts”, to which Cash replied: “They are nearer to you than you think”. After a breakfast of ham and eggs, the outlaws left, taking provisions and a few items of clothing, including the overseer’s boots.

On Wednesday, April 26, the bushrangers met a magistrate, John Clarke, riding on the road near Bothwell and compelled him to accompany them to the Allardyce’s homestead on the River Clyde where they stole clothing and provisions, and two guns and ammunition. The bushrangers were described by Clarke “as having a miserably haggard appearance, badly clothed, and with scarcely a shoe on their feet”. It was generally believed by this time that the career of ‘Cash and Co.’ was drawing to a close. A newspaper report a fortnight earlier had ventured the opinion that, “hemmed in on all sides, miserably jaded, restless, and apprehensive, they will fall easy victims to the first party they encounter”. On Tuesday, 9 May, they raided Espie’s station at Bashan Plains, 18 miles north-west of Bothwell, taking away provisions as well as a couple of horses to carry their plunder.

On Friday, May 19, the bushrangers held up Captain McKay on the River Dee (west of Bothwell). After dining with him, in company with his neighbour Thomas Gellibrand, they loaded two horses with provisions and travelled with their captives the three miles to Gellibrand’s run, where they loaded a third horse and departed. A report of these events surmised that the outlaws had stocked up with supplies and were headed for their “winter quarters, from whence, we should think, they will not be heard of for some time”. The report was correct; Cash, Kavenagh and Jones now returned to their base-camp on Mount Dromadery. In late May James Morrison and a party of constables tracked the bushrangers’ route of departure from Captain McKay’s farm and found their stash of stolen supplies. The horses, saddles and bridles were found twelve miles away, in a deep ravine. A newspaper report of the discovery of the bushrangers’ supplies concluded with the following sanguine comments: “so that instead of going quietly as they purposed into winter quarters, they will be compelled to enter into active operations, a course which will render their capture certain, so vigilant are their present pursuers”.

=== The Antill Ponds shoot-out ===
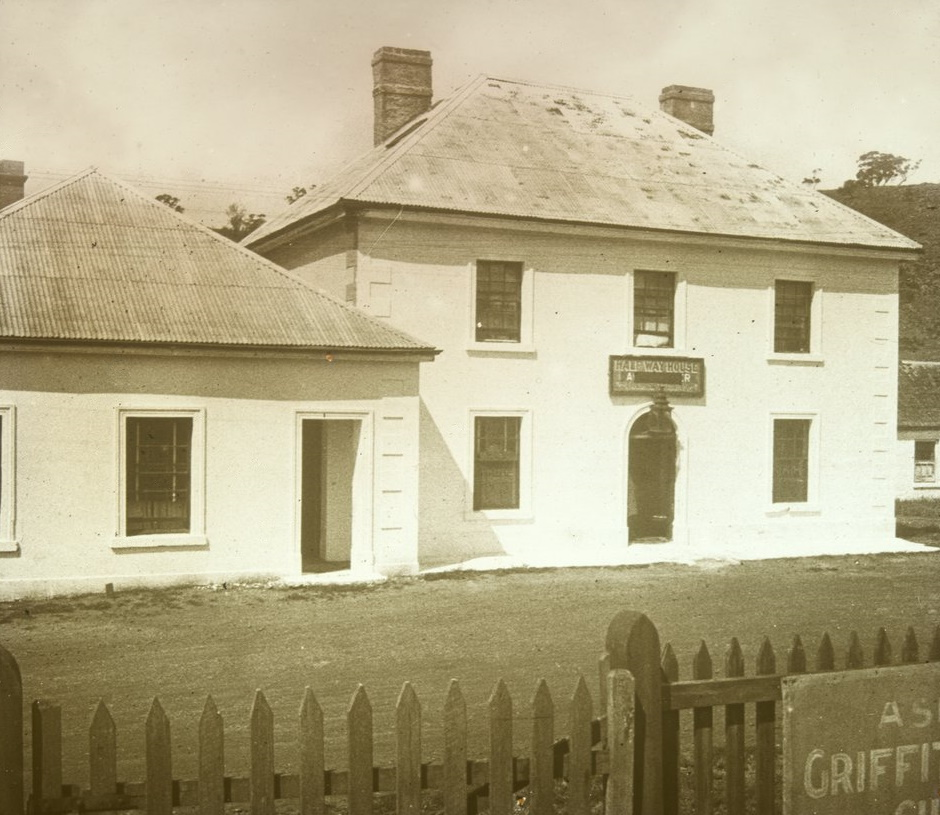
The Half-way House inn at Antill Ponds was named for its location half-way along the road from Hobart Town to Launceston (photographed in 1928).

Cash, Kavenagh and Jones spent the remainder of May and the first few weeks of June 1843 at Mount Dromadery or with the Blackburns at nearby Cobb Hill. On the evening of Wednesday, June 21, they bailed up the Half-way House, an inn kept by Edward Greenbank on the road between Oatlands and Ross at a rural locality called Antill Ponds in the Salt Pan Plains district. After the outlaws departed Greenbank instructed his ticket-of-leave servant to ride to Oatlands to report the robbery. The bushrangers went directly from the Half-way House to William Kimberley’s homestead, two miles to the east. After shooting the lock and entering, they saw a constable, who had been sent to guard the house, in the process of exiting through a window. Fearful of a possible ambush the outlaws left soon afterwards and cautiously made their way through the night to a nearby hut belonging to Samuel Smith, one of Cash’s old acquaintances. Leaving their knapsacks by the door they entered the hut and greeted the occupants. Just as they began to share a bottle of liquor with Smith and his two companions, they heard a voice from outside: “Surround the hut; we have them, here’s their swag”. A party of seven soldiers and three constables sent from Oatlands had caught up with them at the hut. In Cash’s description, in reply he grabbed his gun, opened the door and “discharged both barrels to the right and left”. Kavenagh and Jones gathered their arms, extinguished the light and the three left the hut, firing as they went. In the darkness the only light was the flash of gunfire as the parties returned fire. In Cash’s words: “This was merely random firing, the darkness of the night preventing us from seeing each other, neither had either side the wish to get into close quarters”. More than a hundred shots were fired in the exchange between the parties, resulting in one of the soldiers receiving a slight wound. After the firing had finished the three outlaws laid low in the darkness, hiding themselves behind logs and trees while the soldiers and constables “were beating the bush for them”. The equipment they lost as a result of the skirmish at Antill Ponds included their telescope and bullet mould.

After the bushrangers had made their escaped, the soldiers and constables, and a group of five volunteers who had also joined the fight, called at Robert Harrison’s place, less than a mile from the scene of the conflict. Harrison was a local magistrate and, when informed of the result, (by Cash’s account) “he called them a cowardly set of rascals, ordering them immediately to leave the premises, remarking that they should be ashamed to confess that fifteen, all well armed, were not able to capture three careworn bushrangers!”.

=== Campbell Town district ===
Late-morning on Saturday, June 24, Lawrence Kavenagh walked up to Christopher Gatenby, a landholder on the River Isis (between Campbell Town and Norfolk Plains), and asked for “the master”. Gatenby informed the stranger that he was the master, at which point Kavenagh unbuttoned his greatcoat, pointed to a pair of pistols in his belt and “stated the object of his visit”. The three bushrangers, reported as being “in a half-famished state”, accompanied Gatenby to his house where they ate dinner and drank several bottles of wine, “acting with politeness throughout, and treating the ladies with great respect”. Afterwards they collected clothes and provisions and departed, ordering Gatenby and two of his men to accompany them and carry their plunder into the foothills of the Great Western Tiers.

After camping for three days on the Lake River, the bushrangers headed east towards the Macquarie River, hearing from informants of a police presence in farm houses along the way. On Friday morning, June 30, Cash, Kavenagh and Jones were approaching Cains’ residence on the Lake River, when they saw or heard something to indicate a trap; they immediately wheeled around and headed for the scrub. The party of constables who were stationed in the house ran out after them. The bushrangers fired several rounds at their pursuers, who returned fire. The outlaws managed to outrun the police but were forced to abandon the supplies they had taken from Gatenby. Eventually, “finding ourselves very much fatigued, and also short of provisions”, the bushrangers arrived at James Youl’s property on the Macquarie River where they visited a shepherd, another acquaintance of Cash’s. As they were nearing their destination, they had been spotted by men working on a neighbouring property, who decided to arm themselves and follow the bushrangers with the intention of capturing them. Later that evening at the shepherd’s hut, voices were heard outside and Cash opened the door and fired at a man holding a firearm, hitting the gun and separating the stock from the barrel. With their prospective captors in retreat, the gang gathered some provisions and crossed the Macquarie River to camp for the night.

Late morning on Monday, July 3, the three bushrangers stopped the Launceston coach on the main road near Epping Forest, north-west of Campbell Town, and robbed the passengers. The outlaws were described as having “a squalid and miserable appearance” and “exhibited great haste and trepidation” during the robbery. The coach was detained for only about ten minutes during which Mrs. Cox, the coach proprietor, “rebuked them in severe terms for the wickedness and folly of their career”.

On 5 July 1843 the colonial Government proclaimed that the reward for “the capture of either of the armed runaway Convicts, Martin Cash, George Jones and Lawrence Kavenagh” was increased to one hundred acres of land or one hundred sovereigns (in addition to the fifty sovereigns, free pardon and passage from the colony previously offered). If the person entitled to the reward was a convict, the monetary reward would be the sole option.

After the coach robbery the bushrangers walked through the bush, avoiding inhabited areas, until they were near the township of Ross, seven miles south of Campbell Town. On Friday evening, July 7, they arrived at Captain Samuel Horton’s house and being refused admittance, broke open the door. Horton’s cook, an assigned convict servant named William Jackson, was shot in the shoulder during the incursion. George Jones was later charged with shooting Jackson, which he claimed was due to an accidental discharge of his gun. The bushrangers’ overall conduct was described as "extremely violent, having several times rushed at Captain Horton in a ferocious way, menacing to shoot him if he did not find them money". During these events Horton’s wife managed to escape so the outlaws were forced to depart in haste.

=== Kavenagh's accident and surrender ===
After leaving Horton’s place the three outlaws sought a hiding-place in the Western Tiers, but with parties in close pursuit, they headed for the wilderness area of the Lakes. Along the way they bailed up a shepherd’s hut at a place called Dog’s Head and obtained some rations for the trip. While crossing a mass of limestone rock near Lake Sorell, Lawrence Kavenagh stumbled and fell, causing his firearm to hit a rock and discharge. The ball entered his arm at the elbow, followed the bone and exited from his wrist. The wound was bandaged with a torn up white shirt. Kavenagh was faint but could walk and the bushrangers decided to return in the direction of Bothwell, with Cash planning to enter the township after dark and abduct the doctor in order to treat his injured comrade. That evening when they camped Kavenagh told them he was resolved to give himself up to the magistrate, John Clarke of ‘Cluny’, near Bothwell (whom the bushrangers had bailed up in April, compelling him to accompany them to Allardyce’s homestead). Cash and Jones “used every argument and entreaty in trying to alter his determination”, but to no avail. The next morning they accompanied Kavenagh to within a short distance of Clarke’s place before they parted. In his memoir Cash disclosed that Jones had “privately hinted the necessity of shooting Kavenagh” in case he would reveal their haunts and their visits to the Blackburns at Cobb’s Hill, for which suggestion Cash rebuked Jones, telling him he regretted “very much to hear him suggest anything so unmanly”. Cash and Jones returned “in very bad spirits”, and Cash admitted he "now became disgusted with my calling, being of opinion, after what had lately transpired, that there could be no confidence or friendship between men placed in our position".

Kavenagh arrived at one of the huts on John Clarke’s property on Tuesday evening, July 11. After being informed of the bushranger's arrival, Clarke's overseer sent servants to take charge of the wounded man and sent for the doctor. He was taken to Bothwell the following day. On Saturday, July 15, Kavenagh was brought to Hobart Town, attended by an escort of soldiers and constables. He was described as having a very emaciated appearance and "evidently suffering acute pain from his wound".

=== Cash and Jones ===
Cash and Jones remained in seclusion for a fortnight after Kavenagh’s surrender. Jones was convinced that Kavenagh would inform the police of their visits to the Blackburns at Cobb’s Hill, but Cash was confident he would not betray them. Despite the danger they resolved to visit their friends at Cobb's Hill. After observing the house and cautiously approaching, they burst through the door, to find that Cash's confidence in Kavenagh had been well placed.

In the early hours of Monday morning, 14 August 1843, Cash and Jones stopped the mail-coach between Jericho and Spring Hill. They spent about an hour extracting a total of forty pounds from the letters as well as two gold watches, after which they took away other letters they thought may contain enclosures.

After the bushrangers had returned to the Mount Dromedary district, one day in late August Hannah Blackburn informed Cash she had heard that his wife Eliza in Hobart Town was co-habiting with another man (Joseph Pratt). When Cash told Jones he intended to visit his wife, Jones "coolly informed me that I should find him at the Dromedary on my return". Cash travelled to Hobart Town with the intention of confronting Eliza ('Bessie') and Pratt. Eliza's house near Harrington-street was under police surveillance. Cash was recognised in Brisbane-street on 29 August 1843 when he asked a special constable for directions and was captured after a shoot-out which resulted in the death of a constable. Cash’s trial was held over two days, beginning on September 6 (the day before Kavenagh stood trial).

It was reported that George Jones was sighted in Launceston on Saturday, 23 September 1843. He was recognised by a constable and "a hot pursuit followed without success". It was believed the bushranger had planned to leave the colony on the Shamrock steamer. By November 1843, with Cash and Kavenagh in the Hobart Town Gaol, there had been no recent reports of "their late associate", with the Hobart Town Advertiser reporting "there is reason to believe" that Jones had, "happily for himself and the community, made his escape from the colony".

=== With Platt and Moore ===
After Cash departed Jones established a new base-camp on Mount Dromedary, where (as described by Cash) "he accidentally met with two wretched fellows" who had absconded from a convict road-gang in late November 1843. The two escapees were Frederick Moore and James Platt.

- Frederick Moore – born in about 1818; convicted in Upper Canada for desertion from the army, sentenced to 14 years transportation; departed from England in November 1837 aboard the Moffat, arriving in Van Diemen’s Land on 1 April 1838; absconded from a convict road-gang with Platt on 29 November 1843.
- James Platt – convicted at Lancaster, county Lancashire, in the Liverpool Quarter Sessions, sentenced to seven years transportation; departed from England in December 1836 aboard the Frances Charlotte, arriving in Van Diemen’s Land on 14 May 1837; absconded from a convict road-gang with Moore on 29 November 1843.

Moore and Platt told Jones they wished to "take up arms", which Jones was able to provide, and the three escaped convicts formed a gang.

In late December 1843 George Jones, "accompanied by two comrades", appeared at Field’s 'Swamp Farm'. The overseer, named Shackles, was accosted as he entered the gate of a yard near the house. When the overseer did not immediately dismount when ordered, Jones said: "Come, no humbug; we are bushrangers, and have walked sixty miles to come here to blow your brains out". Shackles and the other servants on the estate were tied up while the house was searched.

On Monday night, 22 January 1844, Jones "and two companions" (one of them identified as Frederick Moore) robbed Mr. Howell’s premises on the Shannon River in central Tasmania. They stole tea, sugar and flour, as well as a number of guns and pistols. This was the second time Jones had robbed Howell.

At about eight o’clock in the evening of 14 February 1844 Jones, Platt and Moore arrived at William Campbell’s house at the Black Brush near Brighton. They gained entry to the house, brandishing pistols and double-barrelled guns. Campbell and two men in the house were tied by their hands and feet. The bushrangers demanded money but were told there was none in the house. Jones went with a domestic servant, Harriet Devereux, to a bedroom to search for money, finding only one pound and six shillings in a snuff box. Convinced there was further cash hidden in the house, Jones said, "We must have it", and addressing Devereux said, "I will serve you first". He tied a handkerchief over the woman’s mouth and, making her lie face downward on a bench seat, tied her hands underneath. Jones heated a spade in the fire and applied it to Devereux’s calves, causing blisters on her legs. He then put the spade into the fire and made it red-hot, but in taking the spade from the fire the handle was burnt and the blade dropped from it. Jones then untied the housekeeper and ordered her to serve supper to him and his companions. The bushrangers departed after two hours.

On the night of 24 February 1844 Jones, Moore and Platt held up the Quested family at their home at Brushy Plains (about twelve miles north-east of Richmond). A hawker named George Taylor was staying the night at the house and his cart was robbed together with articles from the house. In April 1844 Thomas Blackburn, aged 60, was tried and found guilty of receiving goods stolen from Taylor’s cart by Jones and his companions; he was sentenced to fourteen years imprisonment.

=== Capture ===
At about eight o’clock on Saturday night, 9 March 1844, Jones, Platt and Moore arrived at the Wheat Sheaf Hotel on the Richmond road and held up the landlord, Samuel Evans and his wife, and others at the hotel. Evans managed to escape and went to alert the police. The bushrangers stole money, bottles of spirits, and other articles.

Information was received by William Morton, District Constable of the Brighton police, that the bushrangers were being harboured in the hut near Richmond belonging to a farmer named Isaac Alder. On Tuesday afternoon, 19 March 1844, Morton, Constables James Wild and Benjamin Cutler and two others were observing the hut from a distance. They saw Alder come out of the house and go back inside on frequent occasions. At about three o'clock Isaac Dowling arrived on a cart drawn by two bullocks. A man named William Milligan emerged from the hut, took a bag from the cart and both men went inside. An hour later they observed Bridget Brown, dressed as a man, emerge from the hut before returning inside.

There are two distinct versions of the subsequent events that led to the wounding and capture of George Jones and his comrades. The first is the official version, from police testimonies during the trials of Jones and Platt; the second is Jones' version described to Martin Cash in the Hobart Town Gaol:

- Convinced the bushrangers were in the hut, District Constable Morton and his men approached and Morton called out, "bushrangers in the hut, let every man come out unarmed". Alder came out of his house and told the policemen there were no bushrangers inside. Soon afterwards, however, a shot was fired from the window of the hut. Dowling, Milligan and James Brown then emerged and were taken into custody. Shots began to be exchanged between those in the hut and the surrounding policemen. At one stage George Jones was observed to have been hit, his face and head peppered with small shot. Jones, bleeding about the head, came out of the hut and lay down about twenty yards away. The bushrangers who remained inside asked if they would allow a woman to come out, but Morton refused, "unless they would first lay down their arms". Those inside said they would not surrender until they had used up their ammunition, and re-commenced firing from the window. Morton then ordered his men to set fire to the thatch roof. As it began to burn the bushrangers asked again to allow the woman to come out, this time if they threw out their arms. Morton replied that they must come out as well. Two double-barrelled guns and a brace of pistols were thrown from the window and then Frederick Moore emerged from the building. He was ordered to stop but kept walking and was shot by Constable Henry Davis. James Platt and Bridget Brown then came out of the hut.
- After Bridget Brown was observed re-entering the hut the police surrounded the dwelling. The thatched roof was set on fire and at the same time those inside were called upon to surrender. Frederick Moore crept from the hut on his hands and knees and was shot by Constable Davis. Jones was the next to emerge. As he did he "received a heavy charge of shot in the face, which deprived him of sight". The police did not fire at Platt when he left the hut "as they considered him harmless" (possibly after he threw his guns from the window).

The prisoners were initially brought to Richmond gaol. Jones and Platt were transferred to Hobart Town on the following day, but Moore, with a bullet wound to his body, remained at Richmond. Moore was considered to be "in an almost hopeless state". Before he died Moore made a deposition, where he claimed that he, Jones and Platt had been to Alder’s house on four or five occasions. They saw Alder and the other prisoners there, who provided information about the movements of the Richmond constables and other information about the district. Moore claimed he and his companions were known to be prisoners and bushrangers, but were always received as friends. After robbing Evan's public-house they had taken a bag of tea, bottles of spirits and other articles to Alder's house. Frederick Moore died from his wound on March 24 at Richmond gaol.

=== Trials and executions ===
On Tuesday, 16 April 1844, in the Supreme Court in Hobart, George Jones and James Platt were tried on the charge of armed robbery at the house of William Campbell of 14 February 1844 and with putting Harriet Devereux "in bodily fear of her life". The jury returned guilty verdicts after retiring for half an hour.

On the following day, April 17, George Jones was tried on the charge of shooting William Jackson, with the intent to kill or do grievous bodily harm, at Captain Samuel Horton’s house near Ross in July 1843. Jackson, an assigned convict servant, had been wounded in the shoulder in a darkened hallway after the bushrangers, Jones, Cash and Kavenagh, had forced entry to Horton's house. MacDowell, Jones' defence attorney, argued that Jackson had been shot by an accidental discharge of Jones' gun. Nevertheless, the jury returned a guilty verdict.

On Thursday, 18 April 1844, Isaac Alder, Isaac Dowling, William Milligan, James Brown and Bridget Brown were tried in the Hobart Supreme Court, each charged with having "feloniously harboured, concealed, sheltered and protected" the bushrangers, Jones and Platt. Much of the case against the defendants relied on the deposition of Frederick Moore, taken by the Police Magistrate Charles Schaw, as Moore lay dying in Richmond gaol. As a result there was much discussion regarding the admissibility of Moore’s deposition. In the end only Alder and Dowling were found guilty by the jury. On Monday, April 22, the Chief Justice, John Pedder, and Justice Montagu sat to reconsider the cases against Alder and Dowling, during which Montagu expressed his regret that Moore’s deposition had been given in evidence. The two judges concluded that the Court should recommend both prisoners for a free pardon.

On Friday, 19 April 1844, Jones and Platt were tried again, each on a charge of having "feloniously fired" at Constable Benjamin Cutler on March 19 at Alder’s house, "with intent to kill and murder him". After hearing the evidence the jury found the prisoners guilty. Justice Montagu then asked the prisoners if they had anything to say as to why they "should not be adjudged to die" for their crimes. Jones made a lengthy statement to the court, asking that consideration be given to "the deplorable situation in which he was now reduced" in which "he was utterly incapable of seeing anything around him". Jones added: "He had been placed in the situation of an outlaw, but he had committed no murder, nor had he ever violated the chastity of females; he had always particularly and most carefully avoided shedding blood". Platt declined to make a statement. The judge then passed sentences of death upon the two men, describing them as being "of the vilest and worst description". He said he would not be recommending that the Executive Government spare their lives, and advised them "to consider their hours numbered, and... when they were conveyed to their miserable cells, to send for their clergymen, and kneel down and beg that pardon of God, which in this world could not be awarded to them".

During his final incarceration in the Hobart Town Gaol Jones was permitted to share his cell with his old comrade, Martin Cash. He revealed to Cash in confidence that the sight of one of his eyes was partially restored.

George Jones and James Platt were executed by hanging on the morning of 30 April 1844 in front of a large crowd. It was reported that Jones seemed "very penitent, praying all the time, with much apparent fervor", whereas Platt "met his fate with that dogged indifference which characterised his demeanour in the Supreme Court".

== See also ==
- List of convicts transported to Australia
- List of people legally executed in Tasmania
