= List of people legally executed on Norfolk Island =

This is a list of people executed on Norfolk Island. It lists people who were executed by British (and from 1901, Australian) authorities within the modern-day boundaries of Norfolk Island. For people executed in other parts of Australia, see the sidebar.

Norfolk Island served as a penal colony 1788–1814, and again 1824–1856. It was mostly during this second period that people were executed on the island, including 12 on the same day for their involvement in the Cooking Pot Uprising.

== 1800s ==
- Peter McLean – 14 December 1800 – Irish convict and political prisoner, hanged without trial for conspiracy to mutiny.
- John Houlahan – 14 December 1800 – Irish convict and political prisoner, hanged without trial for conspiracy to mutiny.

== 1830s ==
- John McDonald – 13 April 1832 – Hanged for the attempted murder of fellow-convict Thomas Smith.
- Thomas Reilly (or Riley) – 23 September 1833 – Hanged for the murder of fellow-convict Edward Doolan.
- Matthew Connor – 23 September 1833 – Hanged for the attempted murder of constable Patrick Sullivan.
- James Reynolds – 23 September 1833 – Hanged for the attempted murder of constable Patrick Sullivan.
- Robert Douglas – 22 September 1834 – Hanged for mutiny.
- Henry Drummond – 22 September 1834 – Hanged for mutiny.
- James Bell – 22 September 1834 – Hanged for mutiny.
- Joseph Butler – 22 September 1834 – Hanged for mutiny.
- Robert Glennie – 22 September 1834 – Hanged for mutiny.
- Walter Burke – 22 September 1834 – Hanged for mutiny.
- Joseph Snell – 22 September 1834 – Hanged for mutiny.
- William McCulloch – 23 September 1834 – Hanged for mutiny.
- Michael Andrews – 23 September 1834 – Hanged for mutiny.
- William Groves – 23 September 1834 – Hanged for mutiny.
- Thomas Freshwater – 23 September 1834 – Hanged for mutiny.
- Henry Knowles – 23 September 1834 – Hanged for mutiny.
- Robert Ryan – 23 September 1834 – Hanged for mutiny.
- James Burrows – 26 December 1835 – Hanged for the murder of fellow-convict John Dursley.
- George Thompson – 26 December 1835 – Hanged for the attempted murder of fellow-convict John Fell at Longridge.

== 1840s ==
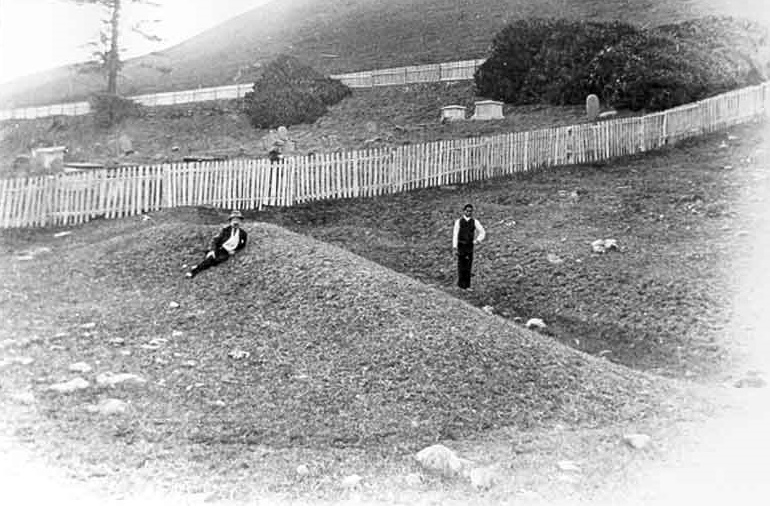
'Murderers' Mound', the last resting place of the ringleaders of the 1 July 1846 'Cooking Pot' mutiny (photographed in about 1900).

- Thomas Edwards - 3 Sept 1845 - hanged at Norfolk Island for the murder of Thomas Charles.
- Bartholomew McCann - 3 September 1845 - hanged at Norfolk Island for the murder of Thomas Charles.
- William Brown - 9 Oct 1846 - hanged at Norfolk Island for the murder of John Dinon during the Cook Pot Uprising.
- James Cairns – 13 October 1846 – Hanged for accessory to murder of John Morris during the Cook Pot Uprising.
- Owen Commuskey – 13 October 1846 – Hanged for accessory to murder of John Morris during the Cook Pot Uprising.
- John Davies (or Davis) – 13 October 1846 – Hanged for Hanged for murder of John Morris during the 'Cooking Pot Uprising'.
- Lawrence Kavenagh – 13 October 1846 – Hanged for accessory to murder of John Morris during the Cook Pot Uprising.
- Samuel Kenyon – 13 October 1846 – Hanged for Hanged for murder of John Morris during the Cook Pot Uprising.
- Edward McGinniss – 13 October 1846 – Hanged for accessory to murder of John Morris during the Cook Pot Uprising.
- William Pearson – 13 October 1846 – Hanged for accessory to murder of John Morris during the Cook Pot Uprising.
- Dennis Pendergast – 13 October 1846 – Hanged for Hanged for murder of John Morris during the Cook Pot Uprising.
- William Pickthorne – 13 October 1846 – Hanged for accessory to murder of John Morris during the Cook Pot Uprising.
- William Scrimshaw – 13 October 1846 – Hanged for accessory to murder of John Morris during the Cook Pot Uprising..
- William Westwood ('Jackey Jackey') – 13 October 1846 – Hanged for Hanged for murder of John Morris during the 'Cooking Pot Uprising'.
- Henry Whiting – 13 October 1846 – Hanged for accessory to murder of John Morris during the Cook Pot Uprising.
- John Liddall – 3 November 1846 – Hanged for murder of Henry Clarke.
- Bernard Macartney – 3 November 1846 – Hanged for murder of Henry Clarke.
- John Gardiner - 9 Dec 1846 - Hanged for stabbing John King with intent to murder.
- John Jackson - 9 Dec 1846 - Hanged for stabbing Aaron Price with intent to murder.
- Michael Sullivan - 9 Aug 1848 - Hanged for murder of Joseph Payne.
