= Convict ships to Norfolk Island =

Norfolk Island twice served as a penal colony, from March 1788 to February 1814, and from 1825 to 1853. During both periods the government in the Colony of New South Wales transferred convicts that had been brought to Australia on to the island.

At first the intent was to settle and develop the island. There appear to be no compilations of which vessels brought how many convicts from New South Wales to Norfolk Island, and when, during the 1788 to 1814 period. One vessel that did was Golden Grove, which brought 21 males and 11 females in October 1788. Rough seas and the absence of good landing sites made it difficult to supply and sustain the colony. By 1812 a new penal colony had been established at Hobart Town in Van Diemen's Land and it had received its first convicts from Britain. Norfolk Island no longer served any purpose and the last settlers and convicts were removed by February 1814. The last to leave left on 28 February on HM Colonial brig Kangaroo.

During the second period the penal colony was initially revived as a place of banishment for the worst convicts, those who had re-offended while in Australia. On 6 June 1825 Major Turton, along with 34 troops, six women and children, and 57 convicts, reoccupied the island. On 23 February 1827 there was the execution, in Sydney, of the ringleaders of a convict mutiny. The 66 prisoners going to the island on the brig Wellington had succeeded in overwhelming their guards, capturing the brig, and sailing her to New Zealand. There, however, they were arrested and brought back to Sydney aboard Sisters to stand trial.

Between 1828 and 1850 some dozen vessels made about 40 voyages shuttling convicts to and from the island. The first of these arrived on 8 November 1828 with 14 convicts, and the last arrived on 6 August 1850 with one. The most brought on any voyage was 106 on Louisa on 19 September 1831. The New South Wales Government State Archives & Records has a web page that lists vessels that shuttled to the Island and back. However the site explains 'these lists are not complete!' and for more details 'see the Convict Guide'. It does give the date of arrival of each voyage, and the number of convicts carried.

Then between 1840 and 1847 fourteen ships transported male convicts to Norfolk Island from the British Isles for the British Government.

== 1788-1807 ==
Vessel	Master	Date of arrival	Sailed from	Convicts embarked	Convicts landed
HMS Supply	David Blackburn	6 March 1788	Sydney	15	15
Golden Grove	William Sharp	October 1788	Sydney	32	32
HMS Supply	David Blackburn	2 March 1789	Sydney	27	27
HMS Supply	David Blackburn	3 December 1789	Sydney	14	14
HMS Supply	David Blackburn	29 January 1790	Sydney	24	24
HMS Sirius	John Hunter	13 March 1790	Sydney	161	161
HMS Supply	David Blackburn	13 March 1790	Sydney	?	?
Surprize	Nicholas Anstis	7 August 1790	Sydney	?	?
HMS Supply	David Blackburn	15 April 1791	Sydney	4	4
Mary Ann	Mark Munroe	15 August 1791	Sydney	134	134
Salamander	John Nichol	16 September 1791	Sydney	160	160
Atlantic	Archibald Armstrong	2 November 1791	Sydney	3	3
Queen	Richard Owen	2 November 1791	Sydney	?	?
HMS Reliance	Commander Henry Waterhouse	13 February 1796	Sydney	24	24
HMS Supply	Lieutenant William Kent	April 1796	Sydney	?	?
HMS Reliance	Commander Henry Waterhouse	November 1799	Sydney	5	5
HMS Porpoise	Lieutenant William Scott	7 Jan 1801	Sydney	?	?
HMS Buffalo	Lieutenant William Kent	9 May 1803	Sydney	9	9
HMS Lady Nelson	Lieutenant James Symons	24 June 1804	Sydney	11	11

Between 1807 and 1813 the government evacuated Norfolk Island, moving the colonists, convicts, guards, etc. to Van Diemen's Land (VDL). The vessels that carried out the evacuation were:

Vessel	Master	Date of departure from Norfolk Island	Date of arrival	Destination	Number of passengers
HMS Lady Nelson		1807		Hobart Town	35
Porpoise		25 December 1807	17 January 1808		
HMS Lady Nelson		1808		Hobart Town	25
Estramina	Lt. Oxley	15 May 1808	7 June 1808		
City of Edinburgh	Simon Pattison	9 September 1808	2 October 1808		c.250
HMS Lady Nelson		January 1813		Port Dalrymple	43
Minstrel	John Reid	February 1813	by 4 March 1813	Port Dalrymple	63

== 1840-1850 ==
Vessel	Master	Date of arrival	Sailed from	Convicts embarked	Convicts landed
Nautilus	H.F. Alloway	1840	Dublin	200	178 + 21 Sydney
Augusta Jessie	J.S. Sparke	27 March 1840	Dublin	161	129 + 34 Sydney
Mangles	William Carr	18 May 1840	Plymouth	290	236 + 53 Sydney
Maitland	George (or John) Thompson	7 February 1844	Portsmouth	199	199
Blundell	Robert L. Hunter	5 July 1844	Woolwich	210	210
Agincourt	Henry Neatby	9 November 1844	Woolwich	224	220
Hydrabad	Alexander Robertson	19 February 1845	The Downs	260	259
David Malcolm	James Cable	25 August 1845	The Downs	220	220
Hyderabad	T.A. Castle	2 September 1845		250	250
Mayda	May	8 January 1846	London	199	195
China	Livesay	16 May 1846	Woolwich	200	199
John Calvin	Hunter	21 September 1846	Woolwich	200	199
Tory	Lukey (or John) Young	1847	Dublin	200	195
Eliza	Daniel	30 April 1850	London	60	56 + 4 Hobart

The last convicts were removed to Tasmania in May 1853.

== See also ==
- Convict ships to New South Wales
- List of convict ship voyages to Western Australia
