= William Kent (disambiguation) =

William Kent (1685–1748) was an English architect, landscape architect and furniture designer.

William or Willie Kent may also refer to:

== Arts and entertainment ==
- William T. Kent (1886–1945), American stage and film actor
- William Kent (artist) (1919–2012), American sculptor and printmaker
- Willie Kent (1936–2006), American singer

== Law and politics ==
- William Kent (MP) (died 1632), English politician; MP for Devizes
- William H. Kent (1823–1889), Massachusetts politician
- William Gustavus Kent (1837–1905), American politician from Iowa
- William Kent (Australian politician) (1856–1906), member of the Queensland Legislative Assembly
- W. J. Kent (1860–1943), Canadian businessman and politician
- William Kent (American politician) (1864–1928), United States Congressman representing California
- William Kent (Irish politician) (1873–1956), Irish politician
- William Kent (jurist) (1881/82–1946), Norwegian jurist and civil servant
- William Richard Kent (1905–1964), Canadian politician

== Others ==
- William Kent (Royal Navy officer) (1751 or 1760–1812), British Royal Navy officer in New South Wales
- William George Carlile Kent (1788–1871), British Royal Navy officer in New South Wales
- William Saville-Kent (né William Kent, 1845–1908), English marine biologist and murder suspect
- William Kent (historian of London) (1884–1963), British historian and author
- William Kent (bowls), Welsh bowls player
