= William George Carlile Kent =

Royal Navy officer (1788–1871)

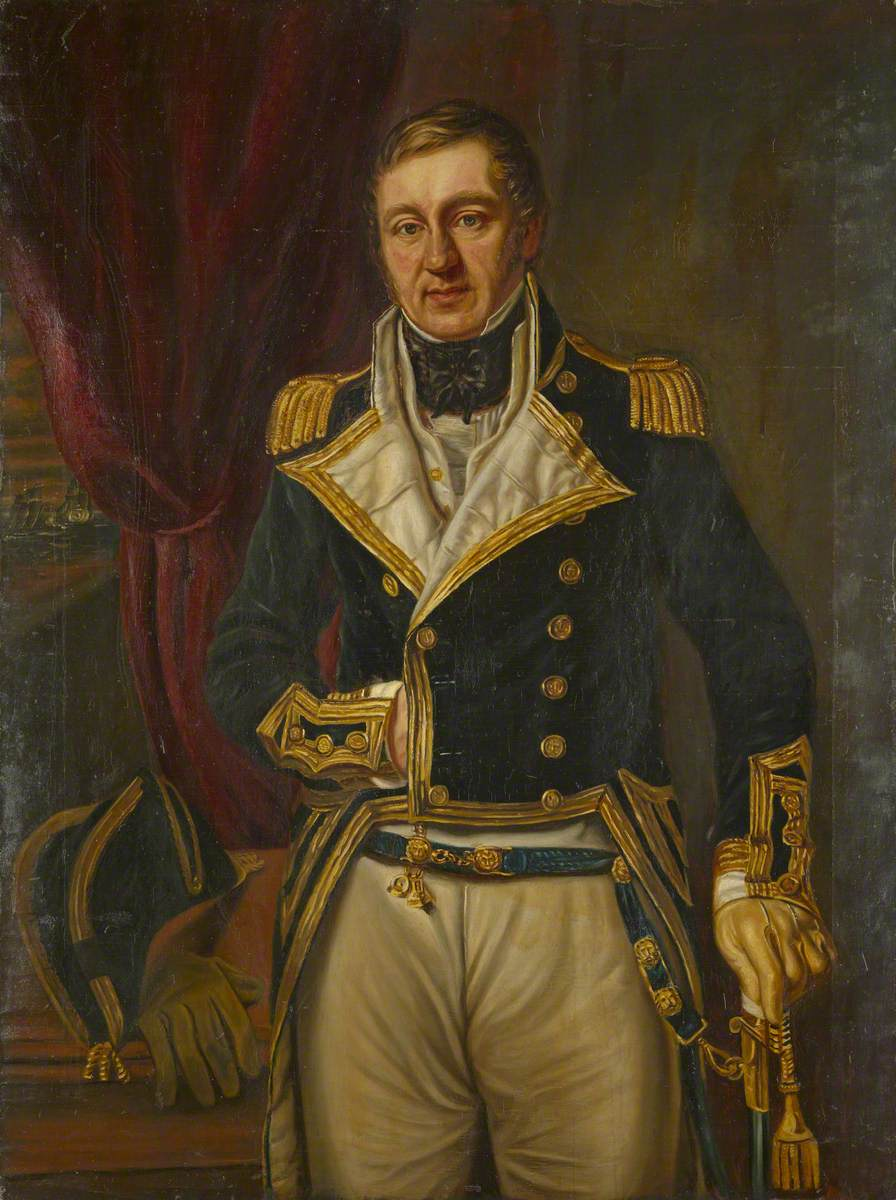
- Born: 1788; Lanarkshire, Scotland
- Died: 13 May 1871 (aged 82–83); County Dublin, Ireland
- Spouse: Susannah Elizabeth Rankin (m. 1830)
- Relatives: William Kent (uncle); Eliza Kent (aunt); John Hunter (great-uncle)
- Military career
- Branch: Royal Navy
- Rank: Captain
- Commands: HMS Lady Nelson; HMS Porpoise

Captain William George Carlile Kent (1788 – 13 May 1871) was an officer in the Royal Navy, who was involved in the early settlement of the Colony of New South Wales, Australia.

== Early life ==
William George Carlile Kent was born in 1788 in Lanarkshire, Scotland, as the second-born son of John Kent, a purser in the navy. William's paternal grandmother was Mary Hunter, older sister of Captain John Hunter, who became the second Governor of New South Wales in 1795. In 1803 his father John became steward of Royal Naval Hospital, Plymouth.

On 2 July 1798, Kent joined the navy as a first-class volunteer on the 74-gun HMS Tigre, under Captain Sir Sidney Smith. Kent was part of the crew on Tigre when it took part in the defence of Acre in May 1799. In March 1800, Kent transferred to the 74-gun HMS Theseus, Captain John Stiles, which took part in the blockade of Genoa, in 1800. In late 1800 he joined the crew of HMS Atlas, Captain Theophilus Jones, in the English Channel.

== New South Wales ==
In January 1802, Kent joined the crew of HMS Buffalo, under command of his uncle William Kent, which was returning to the Colony of New South Wales with stores and supplies. Buffalo arrived in New South Wales on 16 October, she left on 21 April 1803 for Bengal, via Norfolk Island for a supply drop, to purchase livestock. Buffalo returned to Port Jackson, New South Wales, on 13 June 1804, with the cattle purchased in India. In October 1804, Buffalo in company with HMS Lady Nelson, took Colonel William Paterson, the Lieutenant-Governor to establish a settlement at Port Dalrymple, Van Diemen's Land.

In August 1805, Governor Philip Gidley King, appointed Kent to acting lieutenant of Buffalo, but the confirmation of his appointment to lieutenant did not occur until 17 May 1809. In January 1807 he was appointed acting first lieutenant of HMS Porpoise, before being put in command of Lady Nelson in May. Lady Nelson and Porpoise were then used to ferry settlers from the abandoned settlement at Norfolk Island to the new settlements in Van Diemen's Land.

Lady Nelson returned to Sydney in March 1808, months after Governor William Bligh had been overthrown in the Rum Rebellion. Major George Johnston had assumed the role of Lieutenant-Governor and Governor Bligh was being held prisoner in Government House. Bligh had written a commission for Kent to assume command of the Porpoise, after Lieutenant James Symons had deserted and returned to Britain. On 19 April, Kent took the Porpoise to Port Dalrymple to bring Lieutenant-Governor Paterson to Sydney to restore order between the governor and the New South Wales Corps. Paterson refused to sail, so the Porpoise returned without him.

On 28 July 1808, Joseph Foveaux returned to New South Wales on the Sinclair to serve as Lieutenant-Governor until Paterson could take over. Arriving at Port Jackson, he found Johnston in command and Bligh under arrest. As the senior officer he chose to take command himself rather than reinstating Bligh. He also allowed Bligh to communicate with Kent on the Porpoise. In November Kent was again sent to Port Dalrymple to bring Paterson to Sydney, and the second time was successful. Kent and Paterson arrived on 1 January 1809.

By then, however, Lieutenant John Porteous had arrived from Britain to assume command of Porpoise. Upon his return from Port Dalrymple, Kent was arrested by Porteous, charged with failing to follow Bligh's orders (Bligh stated that Kent "should have blown down the town of Sydney about the ears of the Inhabitants"), and confined to the Porpoise pending a court martial.

An order for assembling a court martial was issued 31 December 1810. In January 1811 on board HMS Gladiator at Portsmouth, Kent's court martial on three charges took place. After three days of deliberations Kent was cleared on all charges, recommended for promotion and received pay as commander for the entirety of his confinement.

== Later life ==
Kent took time off to recover his health from his imprisonment, and then in April 1812 joining the 98-gun HMS Union under his uncle William's command. His uncle was killed at sea while in command of Union off Toulon on 29 August. In December Kent became first lieutenant on HMS Sparrowhawk. While still serving on Sparrowhawk, he was promoted to be a commander on 15 June 1814. In September while off Malta, Kent was blinded in both eyes, although he eventually recovered some sight in one eye. He was placed on the retired list on half-pay although he was promoted from the list to captain in 1851.

Kent married on 30 December 1830, to Susannah Elizabeth Rankin, third daughter of John Rankin of Greenock, Scotland.
