= List of colonial vessels of New South Wales =

This is a list of the colonial vessels of New South Wales. Known as HM Colonial Ship, the ship prefix was used by ships owned and operated by a colony naval force or in the service of the colonial administration.

Name	Type	In service	Removed from service	Notes
Acheron	Torpedo boat	1879	1902	sunk in 1940
Amity	Brig	1824	1831	wrecked in 1845
Antelope	Schooner			
Avernus	Torpedo boat	1879	1902	paid off 1930s
Bee	Sloop	1801	1804	wrecked 1806
Blackbird	Schooner	1828	1833	wrecked 1836
Brothers	Schooner	1809	1816	wrecked 1816 Kent Islands Tasmania
Cumberland	Schooner	1801	1803	Sold to Royal Navy, impounded Mauritius
Cumberland	Schooner	1811	1815 ^{[1]}	Dissappered on return from Macquarie Is
Dart	Cutter	1827	1830	wrecked in 1832
Elizabeth Henrietta	Brig	1816		wrecked in 1825
Emu	Brig	1813	1816	Wrecked April 1817
Estramina	Schooner	1805		wrecked in 1816
Francis	Schooner	1793		wrecked in 1805
Governor Hunter	Schooner	1805		wrecked in 1816
Governor Phillip	Brig	1828	1848	wrecked in 1848
Integrity	Cutter	1804		lost in 1805
Investigator	Sloop	1803	1805	broken up 1872
Kangaroo	Brig	1812	1817	
Lady Nelson	brig	1800	1825	cut out Timor 1825
Lucy Ann	Barque	1827	1831	hulked by 1854
Mary Elizabeth	Brig	1825	1832	storage hulk 1832
Mermaid	Cutter	1817	1824	Sold in 1824
Norfolk	Sloop	1798	1800	beached by convicts
Norfolk	Brig	1801	1802	wrecked in 1802
Prince Leopold	Brig	1818	1831	Wrecked at Port Sorell, Tasmania in 1835
Princess Charlotte	Brig	1819		lost in 1820
Queen Charlotte	Brig			
Resource				
Rose Hill Packet	Packet	1789		
Snapper	Cutter	1821	1823	Sold in 1823
Spitfire	Gunboat	1855	1859	sunk in 1899
Supply		1800	1806	broken up 1806
William Cossar	Schooner			wrecked in 1825
