= Governor Hunter =

Governor Hunter may refer to:

- Archibald Hunter (1856–1936), Governor of Omdurman in Sudan in 1899 and Governor of Gibraltar from 1910 to 1913
- John Hunter (Royal Navy officer) (1737–1821), governor of New South Wales, Australia, from 1795 to 1800
  - Governor Hunter (ship), an Australian ship launched in 1805 and wrecked on the east coast of Australia in 1816
- Peter Hunter (British Army officer) (1746–1805), Governor of British Honduras, from 1790 to 1791 and military governor of County Wexford, Ireland following the Irish Rebellion of 1798
- Robert Hunter (governor) (1666–1734), colonial governor of New York and New Jersey from 1710 to 1720, and governor of Jamaica from 1727 to 1734
