= Francis (1793) =

British ship (built 1793)

History

New South Wales
- Launched: 24 July 1793
- Honors and awards: The first ship built in Australia
- Fate: Wrecked on 21 March 1805

General characteristics
- Tons burthen: 41 (bm)

Francis was a 41-ton (bm) colonial schooner that was partially constructed at the Deptford Dockyard, England, and sent in frame aboard the Pitt to Australia to be put together for the purposes of exploration. The vessel had originally been designed for George Vancouver’s discovery voyage of the west coast of North America.

It is generally regarded as the first ship built in Australia. For some years it was the only government vessel available to the governor. Although it arrived in frame in February 1792, assembly was not complete until 17 months later.

Francis was launched at Sydney Cove, Port Jackson on 24 July 1793. She left Port Jackson on 8 September, with Britannia to Dusky Bay, New Zealand on a survey and sealing expedition. Francis made a survey of Port Stephens in February 1795 under the command of deputy surveyor-general Charles Grimes. The vessel also sailed regularly between Sydney and the settlement on Norfolk Island from 1794 to 1804. It was the only government vessel available to make the Norfolk Island run unless a convict transport or supply ship happened to be in Port Jackson.

Francis was sent on three rescue voyages in 1797, to the Sydney Cove wreck in the Furneaux Group of islands, Tasmania. While in the Furneaux Group, Matthew Flinders undertook a survey of the islands. She accompanied HMS Lady Nelson to Newcastle in 1801 and collected 75 tons of coal.

In June 1801 Francis sailed to the Coal River (Hunter River). She returned to Sydney with 150 tons of coal from Newcastle, New South Wales. This was loaded on the Earl Cornwallis, which took the coal to Whampoa. This is believed to have been the first export of coal from Newcastle.

In 1803 Francis picked up survivors and cargo from HMS Porpoise, which had been wrecked on the Wreck Reefs. Francis travelled to the reefs in company with the Rolla and Cumberland. In November 1804 Francis was one of small fleet of ships embarking with a party of 181 persons to form a new Settlement at Port Dalrymple. She was in the company of HMS Buffalo, His Majesty's Armed Survey Vessel Lady Nelson, and HMCS Integrity.

== Fate ==
She was wrecked on 21 March 1805, north of the Hunter River, Newcastle, on the Oyster Bank. Her master at the time was Captain Edwards, and there were no casualties.
