= Eliza Kent =

British traveller and writer

- Born: 1760
- Died: 29 January 1810 (aged 49–50); London
- Occupations: First Lady and writer
- Writing career
- Genre: travel

Eliza Kent (1760 – 29 January 1810) was a British traveller and writer. It is thought that Eliza was the first European woman to have official duties in Australia as "First Lady" to her husband's uncle who was the second Governor of New South Wales. She spent five years travelling on board a ship and wrote about her visit to New Caledonia and one of her voyages from New South Wales to England.

== Life ==
Kent's father William was from Newcastle and she is said to have received several offers before she married William Kent who was in the navy and he was her cousin. They married in Newcastle in 1791 and their first child was born in 1792 who they named after John Hunter. At the beginning of 1795 the family set off on HMS Supply under her husband's command bound for Sydney en route to New South Wales. They arrived in Sydney where William's uncle John Hunter joined the party. On 16 February, they sailed for New South Wales accompanied by Captain John Hunter in HMS Reliance.

Hunter was the new and only the second governor of the colony. Hunter was a single man, so Eliza would take up the role of "First Lady" at the governor's receptions. It is thought that Eliza was the first European woman to have official duties in Australia.

The ships arrived at Sydney on 7 September, and for the next five years Kent was employed in the service of the colony, making voyages to Norfolk Island and the Cape of Good Hope, and surveying parts of the coast of New South Wales.

In 1800 Governor Hunter returned to London on board HMS Buffalo with her husband as the captain and she and their family were on board. When they reached the UK they returned almost immediately, but they left their three children in the UK. She was on that ship for five years as once back in Australia they set out for New Caledonia and then to Calcutta. Whilst she was in New Caledonia she wrote to her mother about life there. In 1807 she wrote for the Athenaeum magazine about life in New Caledonia as it was an area of the world that few people knew about. This was followed by another piece that described her return journey of 1800–1801.

She died on 29 January 1810 in London. She was survived by her husband and three of their children who although born in Australia were still in the United Kingdom. Their son, William, was lacking in money until he returned to Australia to find his inheritance. William and Eliza had built a large house whilst they were in Australia. Their daughter Penelope was mentioned in John Hunter's will because she had cared for him in his old age.
