= Stedcombe (1818 ship) =

History

United Kingdom
- Builder: Lyme Regis, or Bridport
- Launched: 27 April 1818
- Captured: 1825

General characteristics
- Tons burthen: 128, or 12880/94, or 130 (bm)
- Length: 67 ft 0 in (20.4 m)
- Beam: 22 ft 7 in (6.9 m)
- Sail plan: Schooner

Stedcombe was a ship launched at Lyme Regis in 1818. She traded between London and the Cape of Good Hope (CGH; the Cape), and the Cape and the Dutch East Indies. Local pirates at Timor Laut murdered her crew in 1825.

== Career ==
Stedcombe appeared in Lloyd's Register (LR) in 1819 with Rocher, master, ownership at the Cape of Good Hope (CGH; the Cape), and trade London–CGH. "Shadcombe", Rocher, master, sailed from Falmouth for the Cape on 28 December 1818.

A letter dated Cape of Good Hope, 5 July 1821, reported that Stedcombe, Cornell, master, had taken the cargo of African for Batavia. African, of the Texel, Scholl, master, had put into the Cape on 8 May in a leaky condition and had had to discharge. Stedcombe arrived back at the Cape from Batavia on 12 December.

Year	Master	Owner	Trade	Source
1823	J.Carnal; G.Griffin	J.Carnal; Birnie & Co.	London–CGH	LR
1824	G.Griffin; Barnes	Birnie & Co.	Cork; London–South Seas	LR
1825	W.Barns	Palmer & Co.	London–South Seas	LR

Stedcomb, G. Barnes, master, left England on 17 June 1824, bound for New South Wales.

== Fate ==
An early report had Stedcombe foundering on passage from London for Tasmania, after leaving part of her cargo at Melville Island.

It turned out that the local inhabitants at Timor Laut had attacked Stedcombe in 1825, killing all but two boys that they then kept as slaves. One of the survivors died c.1836. Stedcombe was on a voyage from Melville Island to Van Diemen's Land. The schooner Essington rescued the last survivor in 1839.

In December 1824 Stedcombe had been at Kupang on her way to the new settlement at Melville Island. She had sailed from Melville island under charter to procure buffaloes from Timor.

At Kupang she encountered HMS Lady Nelson, which too had arrived there from Melville Island to purchase food supplies for the settlement. Lady Nelson departed on the 19th and Stedcombe on 23 February 1825. In a letter dated 19 May 1825, Barlow wrote 'his schooner [Stedcombe] left this port four days after Johns' departure [in Lady Nelson], in charge of his Chief Mate, neither have returned since. I fear they either have been wrecked or fallen into the hands of the Malay Pirates'.

== Bibliography ==
- Hackman, Rowan (2001). Ships of the East India Company. Gravesend, Kent: World Ship Society. ISBN 0-905617-96-7.
- Nicholson, Ian Hawkins (1996). Via Torres Strait: a maritime history of the Torres Strait Route and the ship's post office at Booby Island. Yaroomba, Qld.: Ian Nicholson [on behalf of the Roebuck Society].
