= HMS Supply (1793) =

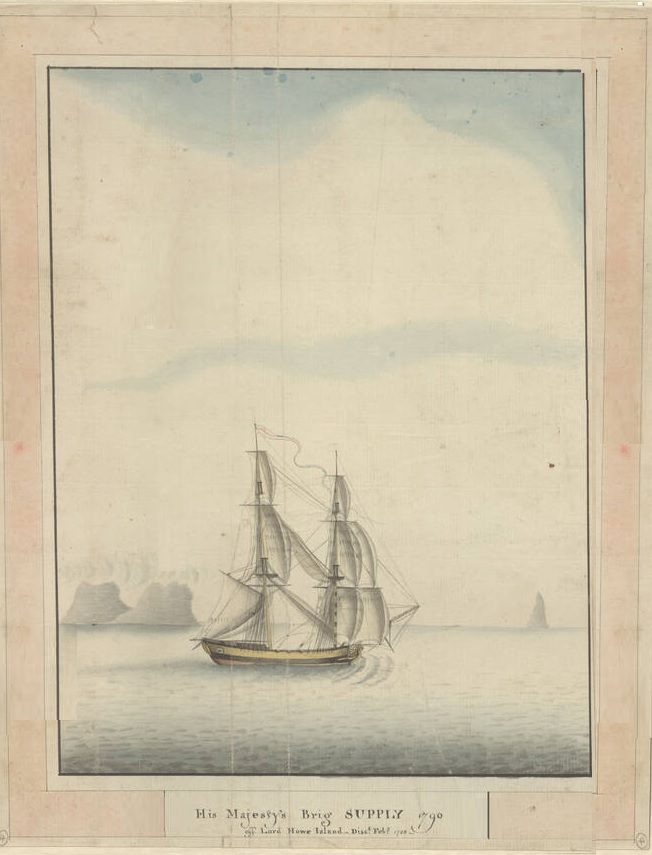

History

United States
- Name: New Brunswick
- Fate: Sold 1793

Great Britain
- Name: Supply
- Acquired: October 1793 by purchase
- Fate: Broken up 1806

General characteristics
- Tons burthen: 388 bm
- Length: Overall:97 ft 4 in (29.7 m); Keel:84 ft 0 in (25.6 m)
- Beam: 29 ft 5 1/2 in (9.0 m)
- Draught: 16 ft 5 1/2 in (5.0 m)
- Complement: 50
- Armament: 10 × 4-pounder guns
- Notes: Constructed of birch

HMS Supply (1793) was the American merchantman New Brunswick that the British Royal Navy purchased in October 1793 as a replacement for HMAT Supply (1759) which the Navy had sold in the year before.

The Navy commissioned her in April 1794 under Lieutenant William Kent.

Supply was at Plymouth on 20 January 1795 and so shared in the proceeds of the detention of the Dutch naval vessels, East Indiamen, and other merchant vessels that were in port on the outbreak of war between Britain and the Netherlands.

Supply sailed for Australia on 15 February 1795 in company with HMS Reliance. Supply then served as an armed vessel supporting the needs of the colony at Port Jackson. She made at least one voyage to Norfolk Island transferring prisoners there from New South Wales.

Supply and Reliance sailed in late 1796 to the Cape of Good Hope to gather supplies for the colony. She later returned to Sydney, arriving on 16 May 1797 carrying the stores Governor John Hunter had ordered and merino sheep for John Macarthur.

Kent left Port Jackson on 21 October 1800 as commander of HMS Buffalo. Buffalo left carrying Captain Hunter, by then the former governor of New South Wales. Lieutenant James Grant was to take command of Supply upon his arrival aboard HMS Lady Nelson on 16 December 1800, however he found Supply had been laid up as a hulk and had been condemned.

Supply was broken up in 1806.
