= Governor Hunter (ship) =

Australian schooner launched 1805

History

Australia
- Namesake: Governor John Hunter
- Builder: Isaac Nichols, Sydney
- Launched: 17 January 1805
- Fate: Wrecked in July 1816.

General characteristics
- Type: Schooner
- Displacement: 35 tons
- Propulsion: Sail

Governor Hunter was a 35 tons schooner built by Isaac Nichols in Sydney and launched 17 January 1805. She was registered in Sydney on 18 January 1805. During a gale in July 1816, she was wrecked on the East coast of Australia.

Governor Hunter was stranded near Badger Island in the Furneaux Group, Bass Strait on 1 April 1809 and was later refloated and returned to Sydney on 3 April 1810 with a cargo of 2000 seal skins. Governor Macquarie made a note of Governor Hunter near Newcastle in January 1812.

On 11 February 1815, Governor Hunter, under the command of Captain Murrell, left Sydney for Kangaroo Island, and there was no recording of the ship being seen again until July 1816, when it was spotted by the convict ship Atlas off Cape Howe, carrying a cargo of salt and seal skins. Atlas was struck by a gale and driven northwards and took an extra week to beat its way back to Sydney, where it finally landed on 22 July 1816. It is likely Governor Hunter was hit by the same gale. The ship was not heard of again until 1818 when its remains were discovered by Lady Nelson, which was on an expedition to find the wrecked William Cossar. The remains of Governor Hunter were found in a lagoon 50 miles (80 km) north of Port Stephens, possibly Wallis Lake. The hull was nearly completely buried in sand but the ship's figurehead was returned to its owner, Isaac Nichols. The crew had disappeared without trace and were thought to have been either been drowned or killed by Aborigines.
