= William Kent (historian of London) =

English writer (1884–1963)

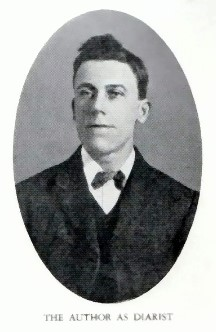
William Kent from his autobiography

William Richard Gladstone Kent FSA (1884 – 9 May 1963) was a historian of London who wrote many books on the history of the city.

== Early life ==
William Kent was born in 1884, the youngest son of Richard Kent, the Wesleyan owner of Kent and Matthews, a printing firm, in Lambeth. He was raised in Tradescant Road, Lambeth, south London, and attended the Wheatsheaf Hall where he taught Sunday school and was highly involved in young Methodist activities. He also watched a great deal of cricket at the nearby Oval and later wrote a book on the sport. Later, his family moved to Norbury, where his father ran a stationery business. He lost his religious faith in his early adulthood, sometime after reading the work of Thomas Huxley on agnosticism.

== Career ==
Kent wrote many works on the history of London, notably his very successful Encyclopaedia of London, first published in 1937, and London Worthies, 1939.

His memoirs were published in 1938 as The Testament of a Victorian Youth. His study of John Burns, whom his father had known as a boy, is his most important other work, offering a critical but witty and not unsympathetic picture of the former labour leader and cabinet minister, whom Kent often visited in the last years of Burns's life. At this time he was living in Union Road, Clapham.

He was a fellow of the Society of Antiquaries of London, elected by ballot on 5 February 1948.

== Death and legacy ==
Kent died on 9 May 1963 at Tooting Bec Hospital, London. His home at the time of his death was 76 Brodrick Road, London SW17. He left an estate of £1869.

== Selected publications ==
=== 1920s ===
- With Charles Dickens in the Borough. London, 1926.
- Richard Kent. In Memoriam. 1928.

=== 1930s ===
- Dickens and Religion. 1930.
- London for Everyman. J. M. Dent & Sons, London, 1931. (revised editions 1961 & 1969)
- London for Heretics. Watts & Co., London, 1932.
- The George Inn, Southwark. Kent & Matthews, London, 1932.
- London for Shakespeare Lovers. 1934.
- London for Dickens Lovers. Methuen, London, 1935.
- An Encyclopaedia of London. J. M. Dent & Sons, London, 1937. (revised edition 1951, revised again by Godfrey Thompson, 1970)
- The Testament of a Victorian Youth. Heath Cranton, London, 1938.
- London Worthies. Heath Cranton, London, 1939.

=== 1940s ===
- Fifty Years a Cricket Watcher. Cricket Book Society, Hunstanton, 1946.
- Edward de Vere, the Seventeenth Earl of Oxford-the Real Shakespeare. Shakespeare Fellowship, London, 1947. (joint author)
- London for the Curious. A new and original guide to the Metropolis. James Clarke & Co., London, 1947.
- My Lord Mayor. Herbert Jenkins, London, 1947.
- The Lost Treasures of London. Phoenix House, London, 1947.
- Lift up your Heads. An anthology for freethinkers. Compiled by William Kent. Secular Society/Pioneer Press, London, 1948.
- Mine Host London. A chronicle of distinguished visitors. Nicholson & Watson, London, 1948.
- London for the Literary Pilgrim. Rockliff, London, 1949.

=== 1950s ===
- John Burns: Labour's lost leader. Williams & Norgate, 1950.
- Let's all go on the Thames. George Philip & Son, London, 1950.
- Look at London. Jarrold & Sons, Norwich, 1950.
- London for Americans. Staples Press, London, 1950.
- Walks in London. Staples Press, London, 1951.
- London Mystery and Mythology. Staples Press, London, 1952.
- London in the News through Three Centuries. Staples Press, London, 1954.
- The Sage of Camberwell. A biographical sketch of South London's greatest personality [i.e. William Margrie]. W. Margrie, London, 1959.
