= Maitland (1811 ship) =

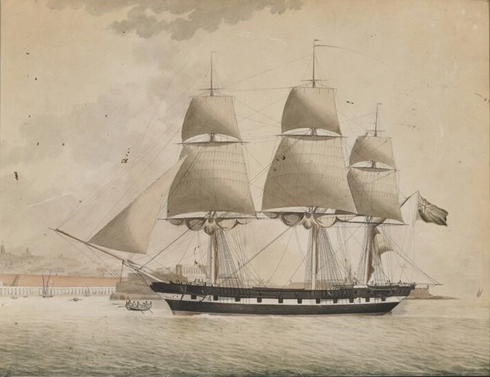
- Maitland coming into Malta 1835, by Nicholas Cammillieri

History

United Kingdom
- Name: Maitland
- Owner: Various
- Builder: J. & R. Kyd, Kidderpore, Calcutta,
- Launched: 4 November 1811
- Fate: Wrecked c. 1869

General characteristics
- Tons burthen: 623, or 630, or 634, or 63473/94 or 648, or 675, or 755 (bm)
- Length: 126 ft 7 in (38.6 m)
- Beam: 34 ft 5 in (10.5 m)
- Complement: 90
- Armament: 1812:18 x 12&24-pounder guns; 1815:14 × 12-pounder guns
- Notes: Teak; three decks

Maitland was launched at Calcutta in 1811. She made four voyages for the British East India Company (EIC) between 1812 and 1830. She also made three voyages transporting convicts to Australia between 1840 and 1846. Thereafter she traded widely before she was wrecked c.1869.

== Career ==
=== EIC voyages ===
EIC voyage #1 (1811-1812): Captain John Stevens sailed from Calcutta on 13 December 1811, bound for England. Maitland was at Saugor on 12 February 1812. She reached St Helena on 12 May and arrived at The Downs on 22 July. Captain Stevens acquired a letter of marque on 5 November 1812.

Over a decade passed before Maitland again sailed for the EIC.

Year	Master	Owner	Trade	Source & notes
1815	Stevens	Brightman	London–India	Register of Shipping (RS)
1820	Kersey	Brightman	London–India	RS
1825	O'Brien; Studd	Ferguson	London–Madras	RS

EIC voyage #2 (1825): Captain John Lynch Studd sailed from The Downs on 18 June 1825, bound for Bombay. Maitland arrived at Bombay on 15 November.

EIC voyage #3 (1828-1829): Captain Joseph Short sailed from The Downs on 2 July 1828, bound for Bengal. Maitland reached Colombo on 11 November and arrived at Calcutta on 19 January 1829. Homeward bound, she was at Diamond Harbour on 18 March and Saugor on 1 April. She reached St Helena on 23 June and arrived at The Downs on 18 August.

EIC voyage #4 (1830-1831): Captain James Temple Brown sailed from The Downs on 21 June 1830, bound for Bengal. Maitland arrived at Calcutta on 13 November. Homeward bound, she was at Kedgeree 9 February 1831. She reached the Cape of Good Hope on 20 April and St Helena on 1 June. She arrived at The Downs on 4 August.

Year	Master	Owner	Trade	Source & notes
1830	Short; Brown	J. Somes	London–Bombay	RS
1835	Marshall	J. Somes	London transport	Lloyd's Register (LR)

=== Convict transport ===
Captain George (or John) Baker sailed from Sheerness on 22 March 1840 and arrived at Sydney on 14 July. Maitland had embarked 305 convicts and suffered three deaths en route.

Year	Master	Owner	Trade	Source & notes
1840	Baker	J.Somes	London–Sydney	LR
1844	Thompson	J.Somes	London–Hobart Town	LR
1845	Thompson; J. Gray	J.Somes; G. Marshall	London–Hobart Town; London	LR

Maitland, Captain G. Thompson, sailed from Portsmouth on 1 September 1843. Maitland arrived at Sydney on 12 January 1844, and left the 25th.

On 7 February 1844 Maitland delivered convicts to Norfolk Island. She had embarked 199; no record of deaths. At Norfolk Island she embarked 338 convicts to transfer them to Hobart Town. She left the island on 14 February and arrived at Hobart Town on 3 March, though the convicts did not disembark until 14 March.

Captain John Gray sailed from London on 26 June 1846, bound for Hobart Town. She arrived at Port Phillip on 9 November. She had embarked 299 convicts and she disembarked 291 at Port Phillip. She then sailed for Hobart Town, where she arrived on 27 October. There she disembarked her remaining six prisoners.

=== Later career ===
Year	Master	Owner	Trade	Source & notes
1850	W. Henry	G. Marshall	London–Port Phillip	LR
1855	B. Miller	G. Marshall	London–Hobart town	LR
1860	D. Jones	Wilson	Liverpool–Ascension Island	LR
1865	D. Jones	J&R Wilson	Shields–Mediterranean	LR; Homeport: South Shields
1869	D. Jones	J&R Wilson	Shields–Mediterranean	LR

== Fate ==
Lloyd's Register for 1869 has the notation "Wrecked" by the entry for Maitland.
