= William Kent (Royal Navy officer) =

Royal Navy officer

William Kent (1751 or 1760 – 1812) was a British Royal Navy officer, known for his part in developing British settlement in Australasia.

== Life ==
He was the son of Henry Kent of Newcastle-on-Tyne and his wife Mary, a sister of Governor John Hunter. He was promoted to the rank of lieutenant in 1781, and after service in the English Channel and North Sea was appointed in 1795 to the command of HMS Supply, in which, on 16 February, he sailed for New South Wales, in company with his uncle, Captain John Hunter, in HMS Reliance. Hunter was the new and only the second governor of the colony. Hunter was a single man, so William's wife, Eliza would take up the role of his escort at the governor's receptions. It is thought that Eliza was the first woman to have official duties in Australia.

The ships arrived at Sydney on 7 September, and for the next five years Kent was employed in the service of the colony, making voyages to Norfolk Island and the Cape of Good Hope, and surveying parts of the coast of New South Wales.

In October 1800 Kent sailed for England in command of Buffalo, and on his arrival was reappointed to her, June 1801, for the return voyage to Sydney, where, in October 1802, he was promoted by the governor, Captain Philip Gidley King, to the rank of commander. The following April he was ordered to go to Norfolk Island with stores, and then through the islands examining their capabilities as to the supply of cattle and forage. He was to go on to Calcutta and bring back as many cows as possible of the best breed. On 19 May he made the south-west coast of New Caledonia, and discovered a harbour, which he named Port St Vincent (Saint Vincent Bay), where he remained for several weeks.

In January 1804 Kent was at Calcutta, and returned to Port Jackson in June, bringing back cattle and other stores. He was afterwards moved into Investigator, which had undergone repair, and in 1805 sailed her to Britain with intelligence about the state of Peru.

Investigator was paid off at Plymouth on 22 December 1805, and on 23 January 1806 Kent was advanced to post captain. In November 1808 he was appointed to command HMS Agincourt, and from her moved to HMS Union of 98 guns. While in command of Union he died 29 August 1812 off Toulon.

== Family ==
In 1791 Kent married his cousin Eliza Kent, daughter of William Kent of Newcastle-on-Tyne, and left one son, born at Sydney in 1799.

== See also ==
- The Kent Group of islands in Bass Strait
