= HMS Lady Nelson =

Australian survey vessel

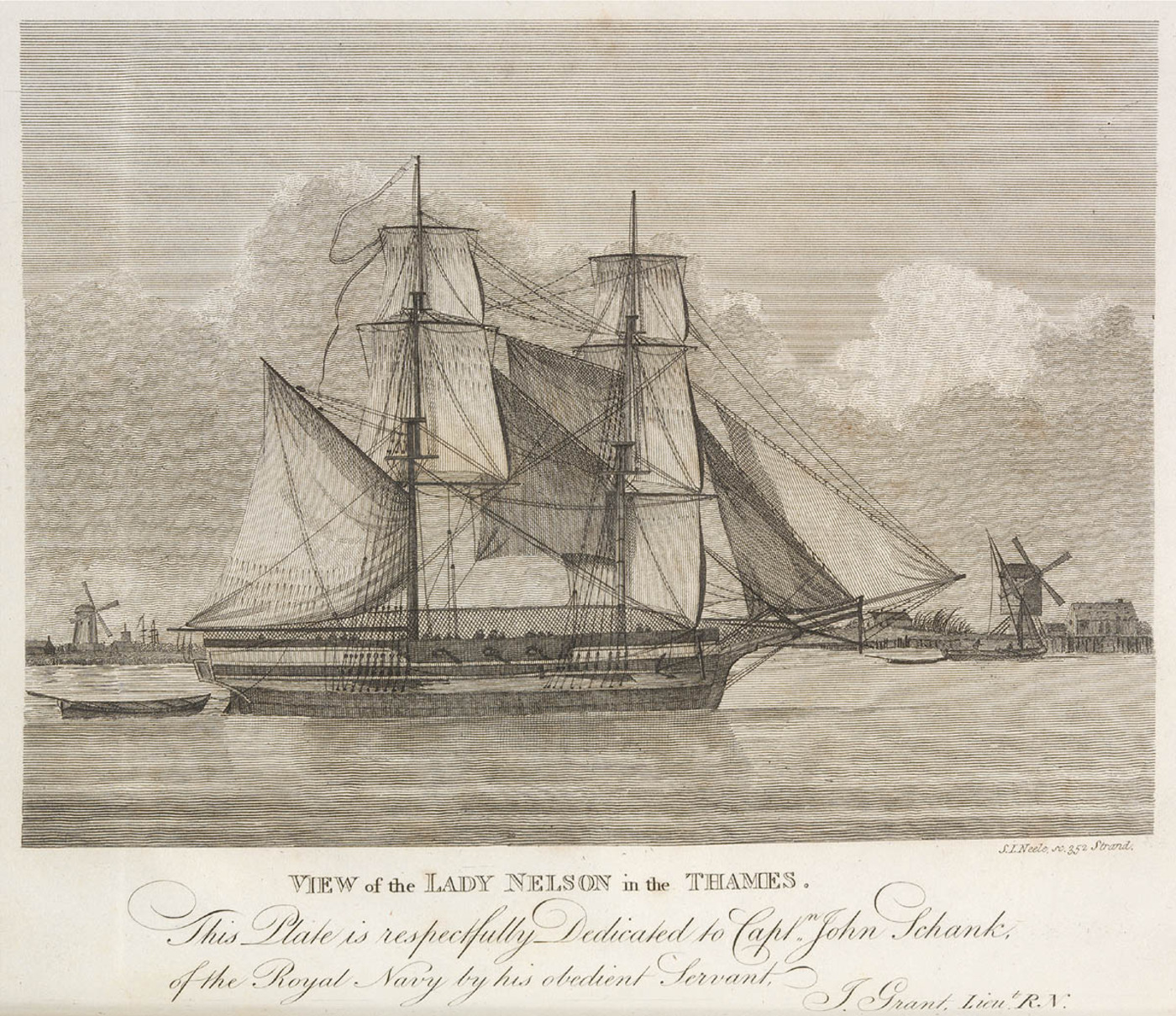
- Print from an engraving by Samuel John Neele appearing in James Grant's The Narrative of a voyage of discovery, performed in His Majesty's vessel the Lady Nelson, of 60 tons burthen, with sliding keels, in the years 1800, 1801, and 1802, to New South Wales, published July 1803, by T. Egerton, Whitehall, London

History

New South Wales (Note: Contemporary full name: 'His Majesty's Colony in New South Wales' [established 1788])
- Name: Lady Nelson
- Operator: The Royal Navy
- Builder: John Dudman
- Launched: 1798
- Commissioned: 1799
- Fate: Lost 1825

General characteristics
- Type: Armed Survey Vessel
- Tons burthen: 60 (bm)
- Length: 52 ft 6 in (16.00 m)
- Beam: 17 ft 6 in (5.33 m)
- Draught: 12 ft (3.7 m) (with keels lowered)
- Propulsion: Sail
- Sail plan: Brig
- Complement: 17
- Armament: Six brass carriage guns (3 and 4 pounder)

His Majesty's Armed Survey Vessel Lady Nelson was commissioned in 1799 to survey the coast of Australia. At the time large parts of the Australian coast were unmapped and Britain had claimed only part of the continent. The British Government were concerned that, in the event of settlers of another European power becoming established in Australia, any future conflict in Europe would lead to a widening of the conflict into the southern hemisphere to the detriment of the trade that Britain sought to develop. It was against this background that Lady Nelson was chosen to survey and establish sovereignty over strategic parts of the continent.

Lady Nelson left Portsmouth on 18 March 1800 and arrived at Sydney on 16 December 1800 after having been the first vessel to reach the east coast of Australia via Bass Strait. Prior to that date all vessels had sailed around the southern tip of Tasmania to reach their destination.

Lady Nelson's survey work commenced shortly after her arrival at Sydney, initially in the Bass Strait area. She was involved in the discovery of Port Phillip, on the coast of Victoria, in establishing settlements on the River Derwent and at Port Dalrymple in Tasmania, at Newcastle and Port Macquarie in New South Wales, and on Melville Island off the north coast of the continent.

== Design, building and commissioning ==
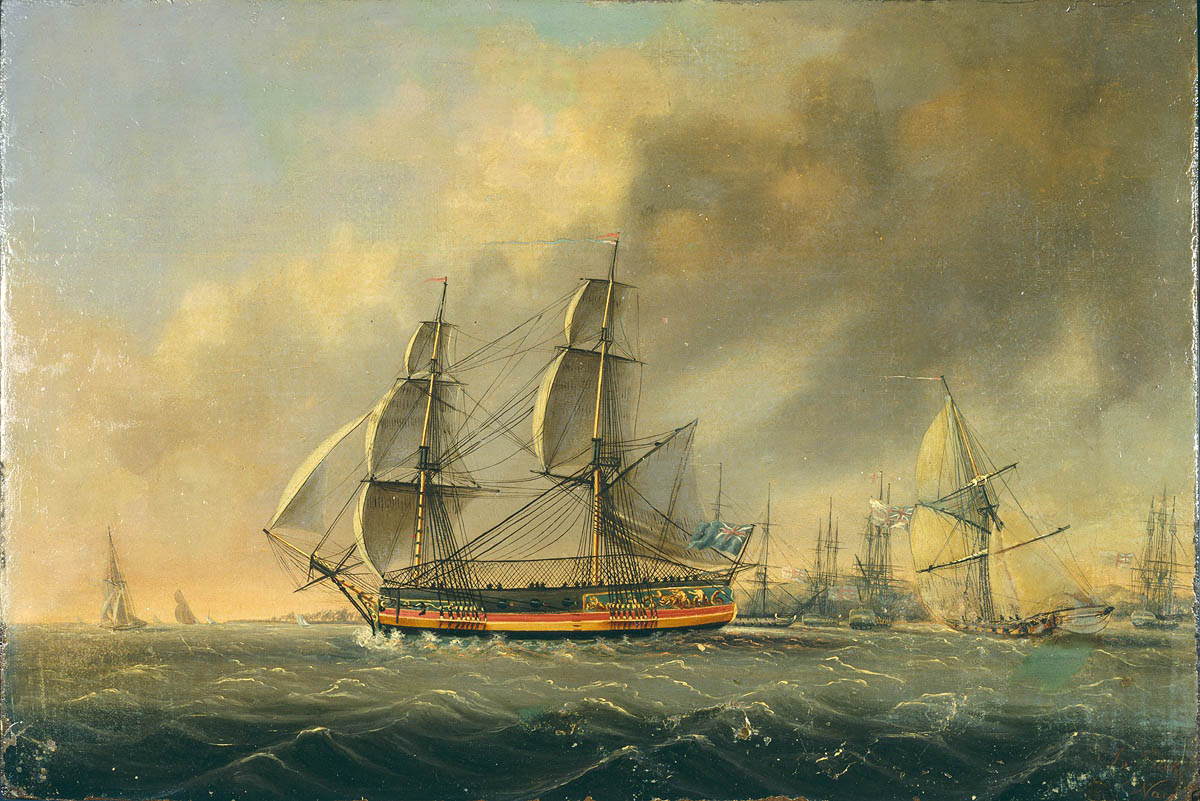
Armed survey vessel HMS Lady Nelson, c. 1800

At the end of the 1790s the New South Wales Colonial Government had no vessels capable of reaching the outside world. Supply (1793) was found to be unseaworthy in 1797 and was subsequently condemned. Reliance was also unseaworthy. Reliance was temporarily repaired to enable her to sail back to England, whither she departed in March 1800. The only other vessel under the control of the colonial government was Francis, a schooner of only 44 tons (bm). The situation was partially relieved when Buffalo arrived in May 1799, but the colony possessed no vessels for exploration and surveying. (Note: Buffalo was a ship of 468 tons (bm). She arrived in Port Jackson on 3 May 1799 with 60 head of cattle on board that she had loaded at the Cape of Good Hope. Buffalo returned to the Cape for live cattle again, departing on 13 September 1799, and arriving back in Port Jackson on 16 April 1800. When Governor John Hunter's term of office ended, he elected to take Buffalo back to England; she departed on 28 September 1800. Following protestations by Philip Gidley King after he became governor, Buffalo returned to Port Jackson in October 1802.)

In 1799 the Admiralty's Commissioners of Transport (the Transport Board), ordered a cutter of 60 tons (bm), to be built for their own use in the River Thames and called it Lady Nelson. Her design followed that of the armed cutter Trial, built in Plymouth in 1789 to a design developed by Captain (later Admiral) John Schanck [often spelled Schank]. Trial was unusual in that she had three sliding keels, or centre-boards, that the crew could raise or lower individually.

At the time there were several other vessels named Lady Nelson and this has led some authors to write that the vessel that is the subject of this article was employed on other duties before being sent to Australia. (Note: See for example: The Times, 20 Nov. 1798, cites a Lady Nelson with five sliding keels being launched on Tuesday 20 November 1798. This vessel was 'so contrived, that by turning a screw, a stem is formed on her stern, and she will sail the other way without the inconvenience of tacking about'; The Sun, 27 Jul. 1799, cited a Lady Nelson, Captain Tate, arrived at Liverpool on 25 July 1799 from Jamaica; Oracle and Daily Advertiser (17 September 1799) reported 'Yesterday [13 Sep. 1799] sailed the Lady Nelson cutter, on a cruize'; Naval Chronicle (Vol. 3, Jan. to Jul. 1800, p. 307.), cites an English cutter Lady Nelson, being taken by French privateers on 21 December 1799 but freed by the actions of Lieutenant Bainbridge of Queen Charlotte; Naval Chronicle, Vol. 3, p. 238, cites Lady Nelson, Captain Barrow, an ordnance store ship, [departing] 'for Gibraltar' 17 March 1800 in the Portsmouth Report; The Naval Chronicle (Vol. 3, p. 326), cites from the Plymouth Report 27 March 1800: 'Came in the Lady Nelson, with fruit, captured by a French privateer, and recaptured by the Childers, 16 guns, Captain Crawford'; The Naval Chronicle, Vol. 4, Jul. to Dec. 1800, p. 245, cites a cutter named Lady Nelson now [no precise date] being on the Lisbon, Gibraltar, and Mediterranean Stations.)

Philip Gidley King, who was in England in 1799, was aware of the lack of vessels in New South Wales, and lobbied for Lady Nelson to be taken over for use in the Colony. The cost to the government was said to be £890. He personally inspected the vessel on 8 October 1799, whilst it was being fitted-out at Deptford, and suggested that:

as few seamen know anything about the management of a cutter, her being constructed into a brig would make her more manageable to the generality of seamen.

Schanck agreed with this change and the Commissioners of Transport were directed to rig the vessel as a brig, and not as a cutter like the Trial as had been intended.

The ability to raise the keels was a useful feature for a survey vessel required to work in shallow waters. Lady Nelson's draught was 12 feet when she left England, fully provisioned for her voyage. This draught would halve to six feet when the keels were raised. (Note: As a result of the consumption of provisions, when Lady Nelson reached Table Bay 'she drew at present not more than five feet aft, and four forwards when the keels were up') The keels were of timber construction with no added ballast. (Note: In a dissertation titled An Account of the Origin of Sliding Keels and the advantages resulting from their use there is a supposition based on a comparison of 'a frigate drawing seventeen feet, and another alike in burthen drawing eleven'. Some writers have interpreted this to mean that the draught of the Lady Nelson may have been seventeen feet had it not been for her sliding keels. This supposition is based on the knowledge of an author in the eighteenth century and would be open to challenge by hydrodynamicists today.)

Lady Nelson was built by John Dudman in the dockyard, known as Deadman's Dock, at Grove Street, Deptford. (Note: The builder's name is deduced from Lady Nelson having been fitted-out at Deadman's Dock and that John Dudman was a ship-builder there in 1799. The dates on which the keel was laid, and on which the vessel was launched are not recorded. She may have been built in a dry dock, in which case she would not, strictly speaking, have been launched, but floated by filling the dock.) Lady Nelson's first commander was Lieutenant James Grant, the commission of whom came into effect on 19 October 1799. (Note: There were suggestions that Matthew Flinders be given the command, but he was in New South Wales when Lady Nelson sailed from Portsmouth. Flinders returned to England on Reliance, which left Port Jackson on 3 March 1800.) Lady Nelson was commissioned:

for the purpose of prosecuting the discovery and survey of the unknown parts of the coast of New Holland, and ascertaining, as far as is practicable, the hydrography of that part of the globe.

Philip Gidley King departed for New South Wales in Speedy on 26 Nov 1799 with a despatch recalling the incumbent Governor, John Hunter, who returned to England. King then took over as Governor and subsequently played a key part in the affairs of Lady Nelson after she arrived.

== The voyage to Australia ==
Lady Nelson was loaded with sufficient provisions for nine months and enough water for six months, at an allowance of one gallon for each man per day. She was not equipped with a chronometer. (Note: Chronometers were expensive and few vessels were equipped with them in the early 19th Century.)

The beginning of the voyage to Australia was recorded by Grant:

On 13 January 1800, the Lady Nelson hauled out of Deadman's Dock into the River, having her complement of men, stores, and provisions on board. (Note: The source of, and the quotations in the parts of this article covering the period of the command of Lieutenant James Grant is Grant 1803, except where cited otherwise.)

Lady Nelson reached Gravesend on 16 January, anchored in the Downs on 20 January 1800. After riding out a heavy gale Grant decided to seek shelter in Ramsgate Harbour. Lady Nelson remained there until 7 February, when she sailed for Portsmouth to await a convoy to escort her past the French and Spanish coasts. (Note: A state of war existed between Britain, France, the Batavian Republic, and Spain, and sailing in convoy was therefore essential.)

Whilst at Portsmouth Lady Nelson's armament, consisting of two brass carriage guns, was increased to six. On 15 March 1800, Captain Schanck, accompanied by Mr. Bayley, of the Royal Academy, Portsmouth, paid Grant a visit. (Note: William Bayly was an assistant astronomer at the Royal Observatory at Greenwich and was sent on Cook's voyages of discovery in, 1772 and 1776. He was head master of the Royal Academy at Portsmouth from 1785 to 1807.)

Many people who saw Lady Nelson did not consider her suitable to undertake such a long voyage and this caused Grant some difficulty in keeping his crew together and finding replacements for those that deserted. The carpenter, who had deserted when leaving Portsmouth, and one other member of the crew were not replaced and one man was put ashore due to illness. When Lady Nelson sailed her complement was probably therefore only three officers and ten crew.

Lady Nelson departed from Dunnose, Isle of Wight, at 6 pm on 18 March. (Note: Prior to 1805 British naval vessels operated under Nautical Time in which a nautical day ran from today's noon to tomorrow's noon, and was given tomorrow's date. All dates quoted in this article are those appearing in the relevant cited document and, to avoid compounding any possible errors in earlier transpositions, no corrections have been made from Nautical to Civil time. Authors have dealt with this in different ways: Grant 1803, is based on Lady Nelson's logs and the dates are expressed in nautical time; in Lee 1915, the transcriptions are from the original logs and the dates are expressed in nautical time; in Flinders 1814, civil dates are noted in the page margins; in Labilliere 1878, dates have been inserted in parentheses in the transcription of Murray's log that purport to be civil dates, but they are not reliable. (Labilliere 1878, Vol. I, on p. 86, states that Lady Nelson entered Port Phillip on 15 February 1802 Civil Time, but the actual time was around mid-day on 14 February Civil Time).)The convoy consisted of East Indiamen, heading for the East, and HMS Porpoise, which was also bound for New South Wales.

Shortly after departure it became apparent that Lady Nelson could not keep up with the larger and faster vessels in the convoy. Brunswick therefore took Lady Nelson in tow, but Grant became concerned that the vessel might be strained too much in the heavy seas and therefore, after a couple of days, ordered the hawser to be cast off, preferring to continue the voyage alone.

On 13 April Lady Nelson anchored at Port Praya (Praia), on the island of 'St Jago' (Ilha de Santiago), the largest of the Cape Verde Islands, 26 days after leaving Portsmouth. Whilst there, the keels were inspected and it was found that part of the after keel had broken off, which may have occurred during earlier heavy weather. The missing part of the keel was replaced, a task not made any easier by the lack of a carpenter on board. Before leaving, Grant put his second mate ashore for sowing seeds of discontent amongst the crew, and obtained the Governor's permission to take two young men from the island to supplement his crew. Lady Nelson left Praia on 27 April. The vessel's complement was now three officers and twelve crew.

On 23 May, the weather being fine, Lady Nelson's keels were examined and it was found that the piece that had been fitted to the bottom of the after keel at Praia had broken off. (Note: The casings for the sliding keels extended above the deck and whilst at sea the vessel's boats were stowed over the top of the casings. Calm weather was required to move a boat to remove a keel for inspection.) A temporary repair was effected by pushing the keel deeper into the well, and securing it with a plank of wood.

Land was sighted near Table Bay at 5 am on 7 June and Lady Nelson anchored there at 5 pm on 8 June 1800. A shipbuilder from the naval dockyard examined Lady Nelson and as her main and after keels were both found to be beyond repair they were replaced with new ones. Lady Nelson had been troubled by leaks in her topsides since she left England. This was also investigated whilst the vessel was at the Cape, and it was found 'that instead of the seams being filled with oakum they had absolutely substituted putty'.

Two new keels having been fitted, Lady Nelson left Table Bay on 16 June and anchored in Simon's Bay the next day. Already anchored there was Porpoise, which had left Portsmouth in the same convoy as Lady Nelson.

Grant's orders were 'to remain at the Cape till the summer season commenced' so as not to risk his small vessel in the Roaring Forties during the southern hemisphere winter. Grant therefore spent many weeks at the Cape and the observations he made during the period are recorded in his book (Grant 1803).

Whilst at the Cape, Grant received a despatch from London in which he was advised that a navigable strait had recently been discovered between New South Wales and Van Diemen's Land (now Tasmania), in latitude 38° south, and the despatch instructed him to:

sail through the said strait on your way to Port Jackson, by which means you will not only shorten your voyage, but will have an opportunity of more minutely surveying the said strait. (Note: The existence of a strait separating Van Diemen's Land from the Australian mainland was conclusively established by Bass and Flinders in Norfolk in 1798 and was subsequently named Bass('s) Strait.)

Before leaving the Cape, Grant took on board a carpenter and a person named Dr. Brandt. Grant also consented to take on board a Danish seaman, thought to be Jorgen Jorgenson, sentenced at the Cape to transportation, for his involvement in mutinous behaviour on board a recently arrived ship. Lady Nelson left the Cape on 7 October 1800.

== The first passage through Bass Strait ==
The south coast of what was then called New Holland was not sighted until Lady Nelson approached the land near the present border between South Australia and Victoria. (Note: The instructions given to the first governor of New South Wales, Captain Arthur Phillip R.N., appointing him Captain-General and Governor-in-Chief of the new colony, defined the territory as extending from Cape York in the north to South Cape in the south and extending only as far west as 135° east longitude. The remainder of the continent continued to be known as New Holland. The name Australia did not come into use until after 1820.)

Grant recorded first sighting the mainland on 3 December 1800:

At 8.00 am I saw the land from the north training as far to the east as east-north-east. The part that was right ahead appearing like unconnected islands, being four in number, distant six or seven leagues. At noon I observed, being in with the land, our latitude to be 38° 10' S. longitude, by account, 142° 30' E. which according to my best judgement, after looking over my reckoning, I allowed the western point of land Cape Banks to lay in 142° E. From the distance I was from the shore, and observing in 38° 10', I make Cape Banks to lie in 38° 4' S.

Grant observed two capes and two high mountains a considerable way inshore. Grant named the first of these mountains after Captain Schanck (since renamed Mount Schank), and the other Gambier's Mountain. The western cape he called Cape Banks and the second, eastern cape, he called Cape Northumberland. The actual position of Cape Banks is longitude 37°54′S 140°23′E. The discrepancy in longitude would have resulted, at least in part, by the absence of a chronometer on Lady Nelson. (Note: Although Bass and Flinders had sailed through Bass Strait during their voyage of discovery, Lady Nelson was the first vessel to sail through it on a voyage to the east coast of Australia. The source of, and the quotations in, the part of this article covering Grant's passage through the strait is Remarks made on board the Lady Nelson by Lt. James Grant, on coming in with the Land of New Holland, in Grant 1803. See also the manuscript Remarks on board the Lady Nelson by Lt. James Grant, on coming in with the Land of New Holland. The editor of the Historical Records of Australia intended to print the 'full journal of Lieutenant Grant in Bass' Strait' in Volume I, Series V but the volume was not published.)

During the succeeding days, as Lady Nelson approached Bass Strait, Grant made numerous observations and named several geographic features along the southern coast of the continent.

Lady Nelson entered Bass Strait itself on 7 December when Grant sighted a cape that he named Cape Albany Otway (now Cape Otway). He named another cape, eight or ten nautical miles East-North-East-half East, Patton's Cape (now Cape Patton). (Note: In this article, all miles are nautical miles of 2,040 yards or 1,865 metres) A large bay, now appearing to the east, he named Portland Bay. (Note: The name Portland Bay survives as only that part of the coast between Portland and Lady Julia Percy Island and not from Cape Nelson to Cape Otway.)

On 8 December Lady Nelson sailed across a large bay, which was found to extend from Cape Otway in the west to Wilsons Promontory in the east, a distance of 120 nautical miles. Grant named this large extent of water Governor King's Bay, but the name has not survived. The discovery of Port Phillip, at the head of this bay, the bottom of which could not be seen from the mast-head, was still many months into the future.

As the coast between Wilsons Promontory and Port Jackson had already examined by Bass and Flinders, Grant did not conduct any further surveys and headed for Port Jackson, anchoring in Sydney Cove at 7.30 pm on 16 December 1800 after a voyage of 71 days from the Cape of Good Hope.

The agreements entered into between the Transport Board and the crew of Lady Nelson terminated on arrival of the vessel in Port Jackson and accordingly the crew were paid off. King had not received any directions on whether the vessel was to be considered on the establishment of the Navy, the Transport Board, or the Colony, and it was many months before this administrative matter was resolved. (Note: King wrote three letters on this subject.: To the Transport Commissioners who replied 'our concern with her terminates with her arrival at Port Jackson'.; To the Secretary of State who advised 'The Lady Nelson is to continue on the establishment of the Navy.'; To the Admiralty who replied 'we think fit that fifteen men shall be borne on a Supernumerary List for Wages and Victuals in the Ship you Command [Buffalo] for the purpose of being lent to the Lady Nelson, Tender, when employed upon the business of surveying.' The Admiralty Order was despatched by Buffalo, which arrived in Port Jackson on 16 October 1802 and Lady Nelson was accordingly discharged from the Colonial List of Vessels on that date. The author of The Logbooks of the Lady Nelson seems to have interpreted the Admiralty Order to the effect that Lady Nelson should accompany the Buffalo as its tender. This is not correct. Lady Nelson was assigned to assist Investigator and was registered as a tender to Buffalo only for administrative purposes.; In September 1806 King was preparing to return to England in Buffalo, and as a consequence the crew of Lady Nelson were transferred to the books of Porpoise. [Note: This Porpoise was a replacement for the earlier vessel of that name, which was wrecked off the coast of Queensland in 1803.] This came into effect on 4 September 1806.)

Before Grant left England he had received an appointment as Lieutenant to HMS Supply, which was to come into effect on his arrival at Port Jackson, but when he arrived he found Supply had been condemned as unfit to proceed to sea. Grant: 'was therefore, to make use of a sailor's phrase, completely adrift.'

== Exploration of Bass Strait by Grant ==
Lady Nelson carried despatches to the Governor of New South Wales that included instructions on her future deployment. The instructions indicated that 'The survey of the southern or south-western coast of the country appears to be of the most immediate importance'. The Governor, now Philip Gidley King, therefore had to find a commander and a new crew to carry out these instructions.

As there was no other naval officer in the colony, command of Lady Nelson was offered to Grant (then unemployed), which he accepted. John Murray, Second Mate of Porpoise, transferred to Lady Nelson as First Mate.

As the crew could only be given naval pay, and not the very high wages paid by the Transport Board during the delivery voyage, only two of the crew that had sailed Lady Nelson from England were prepared re-join the vessel. King therefore had to recruit a convict crew. This he did by granting conditional emancipations to some of the best behaved of the seamen among the convicts to enable them to serve on board the vessel and to receive the pay given in the Navy.

The naval complement of the vessel was therefore:

Position	No.
Commander, James Grant	1
First Mate, John Murray	1
Second Mate	1
Boatswains Mate	1
Carpenter's Mate	1
Gunner's Mate	1
Clerk	1
Able and Ordinary Seamen	8
Boys, 2nd Class	2
Total	17

Lady Nelson was provisioned for a six-month voyage and Grant received orders to return to Bass Strait with detailed instructions to carry out a survey of those parts not examined during the passage from the Cape of Good Hope. (Note: A marginal note, in a different hand, on a copy of King's Instructions to Grant is critical of King's expectations that Grant could accomplish all these tasks without having a chronometer on board. However Grant seems to have acquired a chronometer whilst in Port Jackson as is subsequently revealed in his journal for 23 June 1801.)

Four Privates of the New South Wales Corps were placed on board as a guard and Ensign Francis Barrallier, also of the New South Wales Corps, joined as surveyor for the expedition. The expedition was joined by George Caley, a botanist sent by Sir Joseph Banks to collect plants, John Lewin, naturalist and artist, and an Aboriginal man named Euranabie and his wife Worogan. The Lady Nelson was to be accompanied by the sloop Bee to act as a tender. (Note: Bee was a ship's longboat, which had been decked-in, of 11 tons (bm) and crewed by a master and three men.)

The two vessels left Sydney Cove on 6 March 1801 but encountered heavy weather soon after their departure. Bee shipped a lot of water and was obliged to return to Port Jackson. (Note: Lewin had been on board Bee and consequently was unable to participate in the subsequent surveys.) Lady Nelson continued south alone and, after spending two days in Jervis Bay, passed Cape Howe on the 15th, Wilsons Promontory on the 20th, and sighted Western Port on 21 March. Lady Nelson had arrived off the island that forms the south head of Western Port and from its likeness to a snapper's head, Grant named it Snapper Island, since renamed Phillip Island. (Note: Western Port was first surveyed by George Bass who had sailed from Port Jackson in a whale-boat and discovered, entered, and named the port in January 1798.)

The greater part of the survey of Western Port was completed by 22 April but bad weather prevented Lady Nelson from leaving until 29 April. Grant noted:

Western Port is capable of containing several hundred sail of ships with perfect security from storms, and will admit of being fortified.

Lady Nelson then headed east with the intention of surveying the coast between Western Port and Wilsons Promontory but the weather prevented them from remaining constantly near the coast and Grant therefore decided to return to Port Jackson. Further bad weather was encountered and, after sheltering in Botany Bay for 24 hours, Lady Nelson arrived back at Port Jackson on 14 May 1801. Grant later wrote:

the unfavourableness of the weather prevented me from completing the whole of my instructions ... It is true that the winter season of that climate was fast approaching; and instead of exploring to the southward we ought to have gone to the northward, by which means we should avoid many tempestuous gales.

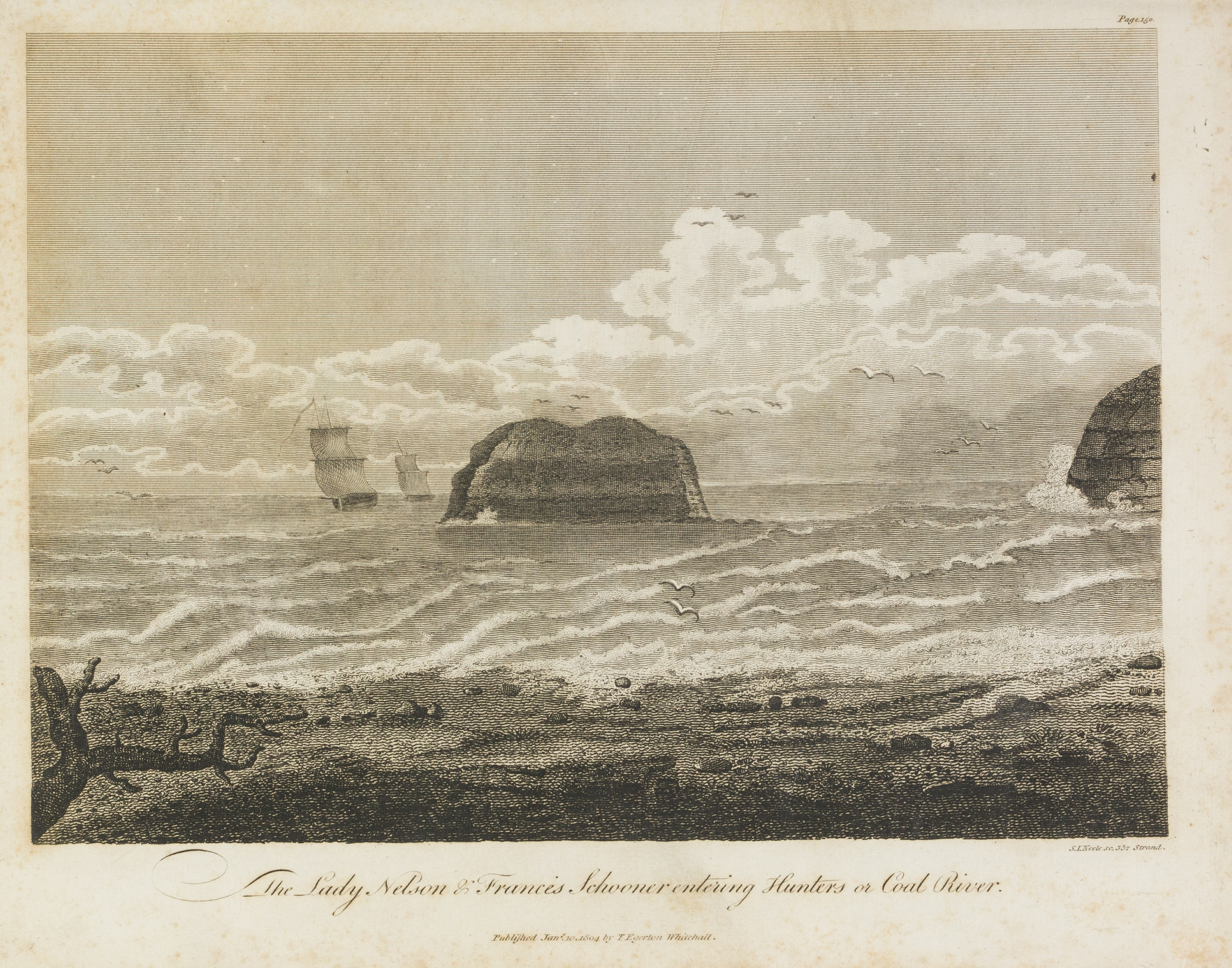
Lady Nelson and Francis off the mouth of Hunter River

After a brief stay in Port Jackson Lady Nelson was sent to explore and survey the Coal River to the north of Port Jackson. The Coal River was later renamed Hunter River and is now the site of the City of Newcastle. Lady Nelson was accompanied by the colonial schooner Francis. (Note: The exploration party included Lieutenant Colonel Paterson, Lieutenant-Governor, Dr Harris, Surgeon of the New South Wales Corps, Francis Barrallier, Surveyor, and John Lewin, naturalist and artist. Francis, 44 tons (bm), arrived 'in frame', from England in February 1792 and was assembled in Port Jackson and put into the water in July 1793.) The two vessels left Port Jackson on 10 June 1801. Francis returned to Port Jackson on 26 June and the exploration party remained until 22 July 1801 when they departed for Port Jackson, arriving there on 25 July 1801.

In August 1801 Grant sought permission to relinquish his command and his request was granted. Grant's last voyage on Lady Nelson was to the Hawkesbury to load grain produced by local settlers, and transport it to Port Jackson. Grant returned to England on the brig Anna Josepha, which departed on 9 Nov. 1801. Grant was replaced by John Murray, Lady Nelson's mate, who was appointed Acting-Lieutenant in command of the vessel.

== Exploration of Bass Strait by Murray, discovery of Port Phillip ==
Murray was ordered to proceed to Bass Strait and survey those parts not covered during Lady Nelson's earlier voyages. (Note: The source of, and the quotations in the part of this article covering the Exploration of Bass Strait by Murray is the Masters Log, kept by Acting Lieutenant John Murray, except where cited otherwise. For an edited transcript of the log, see 'Lee, 1915'.)

Lady Nelson was victualled for a voyage of six months and left Port Jackson on her second survey voyage of Bass Strait on 12 November 1801. Land was sighted on 19 November that turned out to be Flinders Island, in the Furneaux Group, off the north-west tip of Tasmania, and not the Kent Group as intended. Lady Nelson anchored between Store House and Cat Islands in the Babel group of islands, off the east coast of Flinders Island, and remained there until 24 November.

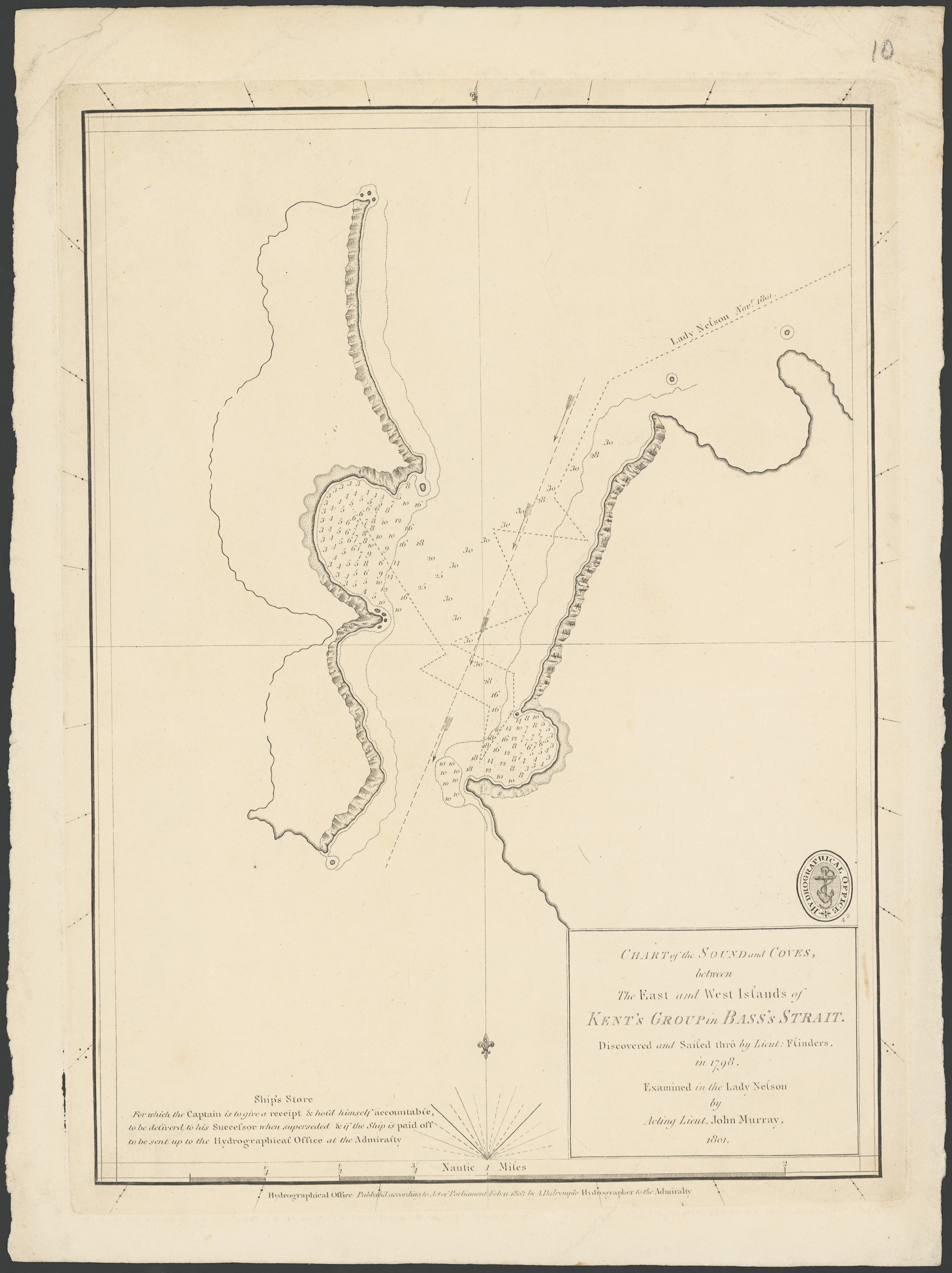
Chart of the sound between the Islands of the Kent Group showing the track of the Lady Nelson during the 1801 survey

From the Furneaux Group, Lady Nelson headed for the Kent Group and anchored in West Cove on the eastern side of Erith Island. Lady Nelson remained in West Cove until 4 December during which time the channel, now known as Murray Pass, was comprehensively surveyed using her boats.

From the Kent Group Lady Nelson headed north-west, passing Wilson's Promontory and Cape Liptrap and anchoring in Western Port on 7 December. Bad weather detained Lady Nelson in Western Port for several days, during which time she had to re-anchor several times.

A light easterly wind enabled Lady Nelson to leave the anchorage in Western Port on 4 January. After stopping in Elizabeth's Cove to replenish water casks, she followed the coast to the west. The next day:

at 3 p.m. we saw a headland bearing west-north-west, distant about 12 miles and an opening in the land that had the appearance of a harbour north-west 10 or 12 miles.

Lady Nelson sailed to within 1 1/2 miles of the entrance and from the masthead Murray observed:

a sheet of smooth water .... and is apparently a fine harbour of large extent.

On the 17th of February, with the Lady Nelson anchored on the eastern shore of Port Phillip, Murray records in his journal his first encounter with local Aboriginal peoples. This initially friendly encounter started with trading, eating, and gifting, and was suddenly interrupted by a violent ambush by another group of Aboriginal people. The crew in response shot at the Aboriginal people, and continued to shoot at them as they fled, inflicting likely mortal wounds on two of them. Watching from the Lady Nelson, Murray ordered grapeshot and round shot to be fired from the carronades aboard the ship at the fleeing Aboriginal people.

"They were all clothed in opossum skins and in each basket a certain quantity of gum was found. ... if we may judge from the number of their fires and other marks this part of the country is not thin of inhabitants. Their spears are of various kinds and all of them more dangerous than any I have yet seen."

Murray did not attempt to approach any closer to the harbour because of a fresh on-shore wind. Not being able to enter, the as yet unnamed Port Phillip, Murray continued west towards Cape Otway but was unable to make any further progress westwards due to a south-westerly gale and headed for calmer waters to the eastern side of King Island. Lady Nelson remained in the vicinity of King Island until 24 January during which time all except the west coast had been surveyed. As Murray 'took leave of this large and fine island', he noted:

I much lament not having as yet had it in my power from the series of unfavourable weather we have met with so exactly to comply with the Commander-in-Chief's orders as I could wished.

Lady Nelson left King Island on 24 January, and headed north intending to run to Cape Otway. However the weather intervened, Murray noting: 'I shall only observe that I never experienced such a length of bad weather at any time of the year, or in any country since I sailed the seas.' On sighting the land on 30 January Murray 'perceived with surprise that it was Cape Shanks [Cape Schanck] and Grant's Point instead of Cape Albany'. (Lady Nelson had been blown several miles to the east.)

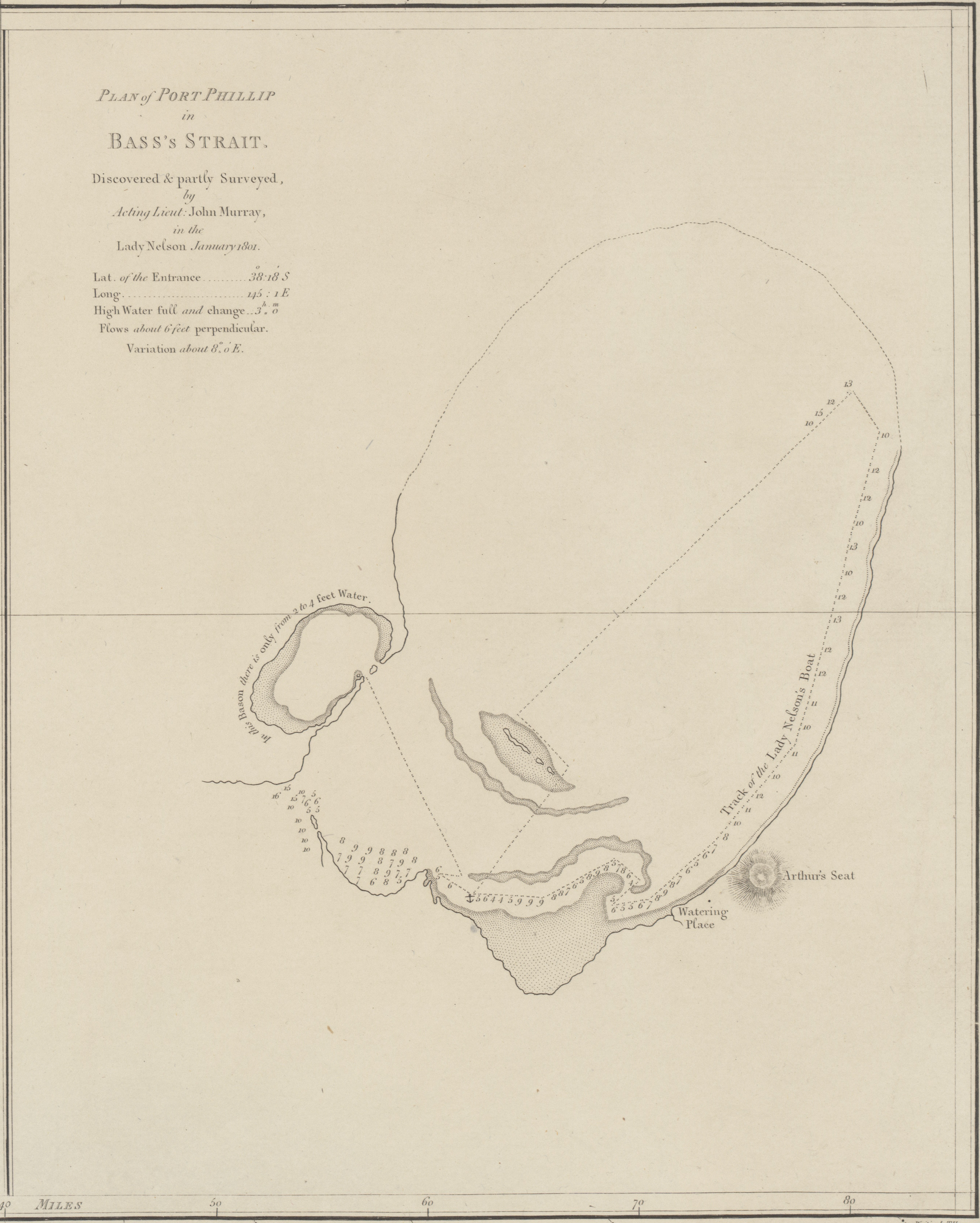
Murray's chart of Port Phillip

Lady Nelson therefore returned to Western Port and anchored there on 31 January 1802. Murray 'sent the launch with Mr. Bowen and five men, armed with 14 days provisions and water', to the westward to examine the entrance discovered earlier in the voyage (5 January 1802). Bowen returned on 4 February and reported that a good channel had been found into this new harbour that was larger than Western Port. Lady Nelson's launch was therefore the first European vessel to enter Port Phillip.

Lady Nelson was unable to leave Western Port to examine the new harbour for several days due to light winds, Murray noting in his log on 13 February 1802:

it fell calm and our hopes of getting to sea this day vanished, it is almost needless to observe that this kind of weather is as destructive to the intent of this cruise as gales at sea.

A favourable wind enabled Lady Nelson to leave Western Port at 5 a.m. on 14 February. 'By noon the Island in the entrance of this harbour bore north half a mile distant' and the newly found harbour was entered, 'with all sail set', shortly after mid-day. (Note: Lady Nelson entered the port on Sunday 14 February Civil Time but the first description of the harbour is entered in the log on 15 February, a new Nautical Day having commenced at mid-day.) Murray named the new harbour Port King, but Governor King later renamed it Port Phillip after the first Governor, Captain Arthur Phillip.

Lady Nelson remained in Port Phillip for 25 days and on 8 March 1802 Murray proceeded:

to take possession of this Port in the form and manner laid down ... , and accordingly at 8 o'clock in the morning the United Colours of the Kingdoms of Great Britain and Ireland were hoisted on board and on Point Patterson, and at one o'clock under a discharge of three volleys of small arms and artillery the Port was taken possession of in the name of his Sacred Majesty George the Third of Great Britain and Ireland, King, etc., etc.

The city of Melbourne was eventually to grow on the north shore of this port. (Note: For a full transcript of the proceedings in Port Phillip, from 16 Feb. to 11 Mar 1802, see Labilliere 1878. For an edited version, see Lee 1915.) Lady Nelson left Port Phillip on 11 March and returned to Port Jackson, anchoring in Sydney Cove on 25 March 1802.

== Tender to the Investigator ==
In May 1802, King received instructions that Lady Nelson was to be employed as a tender to HMS Investigator, during a planned voyage of discovery around the coast of New Holland, and that whilst so employed, Murray was to follow any orders he might receive from its commander, Captain Matthew Flinders. (Note: The source of, and the quotations in, the part of this article covering the period when Lady Nelson acted as tender to Investigator is the Masters Log, kept by Acting Lieutenant John Murray, except where cited otherwise. For an edited version of the log, see 'Lee, 1915'.)

Lady Nelson and Investigator sailed from Port Jackson on 22 July 1802 and headed north. Murray was directed, in case the two vessels became separated, to rendezvous in Hervey Bay.

Lady Nelson had difficulty in keeping up with Investigator, but was able to keep their rendezvous at Hervey Bay. Both vessels continued northwards and Lady Nelson was, on occasion, able to survey parts of the coast where the deeper draught Investigator could not safely go. At times, Flinders left Investigator at anchor and boarded Lady Nelson to continue his survey work. Flinders carried out surveys in Keppel Bay, Shoalwater Bay and Broad Sound and Lady Nelson was present when Flinders discovered and named Port Curtis and Port Bowen (since renamed Port Clinton). Lady Nelson grounded several times, resulting in damage to her sliding keels, in consequence of which Murray had further difficulty keeping-up with Investigator. (Note: At Port Bowen the main keel was found to have broken off. It was later replaced by a new one made by Investigator's carpenters. In Broad Sound, part of the after keel and part of the new main keel broke off. They were not repaired until Lady Nelson returned to Port Jackson.)

After leaving Broad Sound Flinders headed for a cluster of islands, to the east of the Northumberland Isles, which he had seen from a hill at Shoalwater Bay. Both vessels anchored there on 29 September and Flinders named them Percy Isles.

Both vessels left the Percy Isles on 4 October and Flinders spent several days looking for a passage through the reef, anchoring several times in the process. Investigator lost an anchor and Lady Nelson lost one and broke one arm off another. Flinders decided not to attempt any more narrow passages through the reef and resumed the voyage towards Torres Strait and the Gulf of Carpentaria. Flinders provided Lady Nelson with two grapnels, which was all that Investigator could spare.

On 17 October Murray noted:

I have now had several opportunities of seeing that from the want of our main and after keels we are so leewardly that the Investigator in 6 hours will get with ease 4 miles to windward of the brig.

On the same day Flinders decided to send Lady Nelson back to Port Jackson. She was sailing so poorly since losing her keels, that she not only delayed Investigator, but ran great risk of herself being lost. Furthermore, instead of saving the crew of Investigator, in case of accident, which was one of the main reasons for having a tender, it was likely Investigator might be called upon to save Lady Nelson. Flinders saw Lady Nelson, after her loss of anchors and cables, replacements for which Investigator could not spare without endangering her own safety, becoming a burden rather than an assistance.

Murray received orders from Flinders 'to proceed to Port Jackson with the Lady Nelson as fast as circumstances would allow', and a letter to deliver to Governor King. Investigator headed north and Lady Nelson headed south. By 10.40 am, on 18 October, Investigator's topsails could just be seen from Lady Nelson, disappearing over the horizon. This was the end of Lady Nelson's voyages of discovery.

Lady Nelson headed south, anchoring occasionally with the broken anchor, but, when pausing at Cape Townshend on 28 October, this anchor was lost. The remaining anchor was let go, but, in the process, Lady Nelson drifted away from the intended anchorage. With only one remaining anchor, and only one small boat, Lady Nelson was in a precarious situation.

As it was essential to move to a safer anchorage, Murray improvised an anchor by lashing two swivel guns together, which enabled Lady Nelson to sail into a more sheltered anchorage in Shoalwater Bay. The carpenter then went ashore in the boat to find an iron-bark tree with which to make a replacement anchor.

The remainder of the voyage to Port Jackson was uneventful and Lady Nelson anchored in Sydney Cove at 10.40 am on 22 November 1802.

Before her next significant voyage, Lady Nelson made another trip to Norfolk Island to convey troops to relieve the garrison there. This was probably Lady Nelson's last voyage under Murray. Lady Nelsons's next commander was George Curtoys, (sometimes spelt Courtoys but spelt Curtoys in the commander's own log), previously the master's mate of HMS Glatton, which had arrived from England in March 1803.

== The Settlement of the Derwent ==
Lady Nelson was one of the vessels selected to establish the first settlement in Tasmania. The desire to settle that part of Australia arose from King's concern that Baudin, leader of the French expedition in La Naturaliste, intended to establish a settlement on the east side of Van Diemen's Land.

King chose Risdon Cove, on the east bank of the river Derwent, near where the city of Hobart now stands, as the site for the new settlement. Matthew Flinders and George Bass had previously visited the site during their circumnavigation of Van Diemen's Land.

An initial expedition to establish British sovereignty over Van Diemen's Land was made by Acting-Lieutenant Charles Robbins, who left Port Jackson in HMS Cumberland on 23 November 1802. (Note: Cumberland was a schooner of 26 tons (bm), built in Port Jackson in 1801.)

Lieutenant John Bowen, an officer in the recently arrived Glatton, was chosen as Commandant and Superintendent of the new settlement and was instructed to proceed with Lady Nelson and Porpoise, and with the men, women, stores, and provisions necessary for forming the intended settlement. The vessels departed for the Derwent on 11 and 17 June 1803 respectively. (Note: The source of the part of this article covering Lady Nelson's voyage to Risdon Cove is A Journal of the Proceedings on board H.M. Brig Lady Nelson (Tender to H.M. Armed Vessel Buffalo), Lieut. Geo. Curtoys, Commander. For a shorter edited version see 'Lee, 1915', pp. 218–222.)

Lady Nelson made good progress until 15 June when she encountered a strong southerly wind and Curtoys decided to head for shelter in Twofold Bay. The adverse winds continued for several days, driving her back to the north; on 21 June heavy seas resulted in the loss of the Lady Nelson's boat. The safety of Twofold Bay was not reached until 24 June by which time all Lady Nelson's supply of bread had been consumed and only three casks of water remained. A raft was constructed from her spars to get ashore to replenish their supply of fresh water and the Lady Nelson's carpenter was sent to cut timber with which to build a punt to replace the lost boat. Lady Nelson left Twofold Bay on 1 July to continue her voyage, but soon afterwards part of the main keel was seen drifting away astern. At this point the voyage was aborted and Lady Nelson returned to Port Jackson.

Lady Nelson arrived back in Port Jackson on 5 July and found that Porpoise had also turned back and had arrived two days earlier.

Lady Nelson departed again on 21 August 1803 but, two days out, her main mast was found to be sprung (damaged). Once again she had to return.

Lady Nelson was repaired and set off again on 29 August 1803, this time accompanied by the whaler Albion. Lady Nelson had a reasonably uneventful voyage and anchored in Risdon Cove on the River Derwent on 9 September 1803. Albion arrived two days later. The next several days were employed in landing stores and establishing the settlers on shore. Both vessels had departed before the end of September leaving the settlement, comprising 49 souls, with no means of communication with the outside world.

== Evacuation of the Settlement at Port Phillip ==
In October 1803 two ships, Ocean and Calcutta, arrived in Port Phillip, from England, with the intention of establishing a settlement. Lieutenant-Colonel David Collins was to be Lieutenant-Governor of the new settlement. The venture was unsuccessful and a decision was taken to abandon the settlement and move its people to Van Diemen's Land. Two locations were considered: either the existing settlement on the Derwent, or a new settlement at Port Dalrymple.

As the only vessels available, Lady Nelson and Francis, could not have carried out the task in a reasonable time, King hired the transport Ocean and the whaler Edwin to assist them. The 'fleet' therefore comprised four vessels.

George Curtoys, who had been ill for some time, had to relinquish command of Lady Nelson in November 1803, and returned to England in HMS Calcutta. He was replaced by James Symons, previously Calcutta's Mate, who took command for the voyage to Port Phillip. (Note: Symons seems to have remained in command of Lady Nelson on his Mate's pay until 1 October 1804 when King issued a warrant appointing him Acting-Lieutenant in command of the vessel which entitled him to a lieutenant's pay. King subsequently wrote to the Admiralty seeking their approval. The Admiralty eventually approved King's action but Symons could not be commissioned as a Lieutenant as he had not obtained a Lieutenant's Passing Certificate, and this could not be done in the colony at the time. In this respect Lee's note 'The Governor had then received an Admiralty order to make the appointment' [of Lieutenant in command] is misleading.)

Lady Nelson left Port Jackson on 28 November 1803. On board was the naturalist Robert Brown, one of the scientific people who came from England on Investigator. (Note: The source of the part of this article covering the evacuation of the settlement at Port Phillip is Lee 1915, except where cited otherwise.)

Rough weather was experienced on arriving in Bass Strait, and after beating a fortnight against a south-westerly wind, Lady Nelson took refuge in the Kent Group. Twice Lady Nelson left the anchorage there to try to reach the destination, and twice she had to return.

Ocean arrived at Port Phillip on 12 December 1803 and Francis the next day. The master of Francis reported to Colonel Collins having seen smoke rising from one of the islands in the Kent Group. This raised concerns over the safety of Lady Nelson, which had not yet arrived at Port Phillip.

Colonel Collins sent William Collins, in Francis, to assess the suitability of Port Dalrymple as a place to re-settle the people from Port Phillip. (Note: William Collins was a former naval officer who had arrived on Ocean as a settler.) The master of Francis was requested to sail via the Kent Group to look for Lady Nelson.

William Collins found Lady Nelson in the Kent Group but by this time Francis herself was in a very leaky condition and was sent back to Port Jackson. William Collins continued to Port Dalrymple in Lady Nelson, arriving there on 1 January 1804 and remaining until 18 January 1804. William Collins arrived back in Port Phillip, aboard Lady Nelson on 21 January 1804, with a favourable report on Port Dalrymple, but Colonel Collins had already decided to move to the Derwent.

Lady Nelson and Ocean left Port Phillip for the Derwent with the first contingent of settlers on 30 January 1804. Ocean returned to Port Phillip later and brought the remainder of the people. (Note: Colonel Collins selected a site at Sullivans Cove for his settlement. This was on the west bank of the Derwent where the city of Hobart now stands.) Lady Nelson left the Derwent on 6 March and arrived back in Port Jackson on 14 March 1804.

During the next few months Lady Nelson was employed on various transport duties which included taking people to a new settlement to be established at Kingstown, soon after renamed Newcastle, on the Hunter.

== The settlement of Port Dalrymple ==
In May 1804 King received instructions to close the settlement at Norfolk Island and transfer its existing settlers from there to a new settlement at Port Dalrymple in Van Diemen's Land; Bass and Flinders had discovered Port Dalrymple during their circumnavigation of Van Diemen's Land. Lieutenant Colonel Paterson was placed in charge as Lieutenant-Governor of the new settlement. (Note: In his instructions Hobart seems confused about the location of Port Dalrymple, referring to its 'advantageous position of which upon the southern coast of Van Dieman's Land'. Port Dalrymple is on the north coast of Tasmania, 50 km north of the present-day city of Launceston. King resolved this confusion in consultation with his officers.)

To prepare the new settlement, for the people from Norfolk Island, Paterson left Port Jackson in the cutter Integrity, accompanied by the sloop Contest, on 7 June 1804, but bad weather forced both vessels back to port. (Note: Integrity was a cutter of 60 tons burthen that the Colonial Government had built in Port Jackson in 1804. Contest was a sloop of 44 tons (bm) built in Port Jackson by James Underwood, in 1804.) Paterson subsequently departed on Buffalo on 15 October 1804 accompanied by Lady Nelson, Francis, and Integrity.

At first good progress was made down the coast and Lady Nelson's log reported the 'squadron in company' on 18 October. (Note: The source of, and the quotations in, the part of this article covering Lady Nelson's voyage to Port Dalrymple is 'Lee 1915', except where cited otherwise.) On 22 October Lady Nelson encountered 'strong gales with a heavy sea from south-west' that caused considerable damage including the boat, binnacle and two compasses being washed overboard; and the main sheet carrying away and breaking the tiller. The next day the fore keel was found to have been broken-off and Symons decided to head into Twofold Bay for shelter and to carry out repairs to the vessel.

Lady Nelson anchored on the southern shore of Twofold Bay on 25 October and the crew again had to improvise a raft from the vessel's spars to get ashore. Lady Nelson got under way again on 3 November; attempts to leave on 1 and 2 November were both aborted due to the weather. She encountered the sloop George, which was bound for the Derwent from Port Jackson, shortly after leaving Twofold Bay and its master gave a boat's compass to Symons to replace those lost in the storm. (Note: George was a sloop of 28 tons (bm), privately built on the Hawkesbury River.)

The bad weather continued:

- on 5 November 'the main top-sail blown out of the bolt rope and was lost',
- on 6 November 'at 4 pm took in all sail'; and
- on 7 November 'Strong gales and bad sea. At 8 blew the fore stay-sail totally away and split the main stay-sail.'

Lady Nelson headed down the western side of Flinders Island, sighted Cape Barren on 9 November, 'beat in through the narrows' and on 10 November reached Kent's Bay, on the south side of Cape Barren Island, where the schooner Francis was found at anchor, also sheltering from the weather. Lady Nelson remained in Kent's Bay, repairing storm damage, until 13 November when both vessels got under way. The next day Lady Nelson sought shelter at Waterhouse Island and remained there until 20 November when the weather improved.

Lady Nelson, with Francis in company, finally reached Port Dalrymple on 21 November 1804. Buffalo, a larger vessel, had arrived on 4 November 1804, and Integrity had arrived the next day.

After she had unloaded her cargo, Lady Nelson was employed in surveying and erecting beacons in the harbour to facilitate the safe entry of ships into the new port.

Buffalo and Integrity departed on 27 November, and Francis on 29 December 1804. Lady Nelson, the last of the small squadron to leave, departed on 11 January 1805. The settlement was initially located at Outer Cove on the east side of the River Tamar but soon relocated to York Cove on the west side of the river. Eventually the settlement was moved further up the river to a spot near the confluence of the North and South Esk rivers that Paterson named Launceston. Lady Nelson arrived back in Port Jackson on 23 January 1805.

== Capture of Extremeña ==
In April 1805 King received information that suggested that a Spanish armed schooner was anchored in Jervis Bay, 90 miles to the south of Sydney. King sent Lady Nelson, under the command of Acting-Lieutenant Symons, to look for the Spanish vessel and, if found, bring her to Port Jackson.

The Spanish vessel was Extremeña, an armed merchant vessel owned by merchants in Madras that had been seized on the coast of Chile. Britain and Spain were not at war at the time of the seizure, which was therefore illegal. On sighting Lady Nelson, Extremeña tried to escape but Symons fired a shot across her bows, arrested her, and escorted her back to Port Jackson.

== Later service ==
Lady Nelson continued to be employed in carrying passengers and supplies between Port Jackson and the other settlements along the coast of New South Wales and Tasmania for many years. Some of these voyages were recorded in the newspapers of the time. A few of these voyages are mentioned below where of particular interest.

She made a voyage to New Zealand in 1806 to return Tip-pa-he, a Maori Chief, to his residence. Tip-pa-he, was the head of the Maoris inhabiting the country contiguous to the Bay of Islands. Five of his sons accompanied him.

Lady Nelson was laid-up for a while at the time of the departure of Governor Bligh to England in March 1809, but soon returned to service and made four voyages to Hunter's River before the end of the year.

Governor Lachlan Macquarie sailed in Lady Nelson to conduct a tour of inspection of the two settlements in Van Diemen's Land. She left Port Jackson on 4 November 1811 and returned on 6 January 1812, after calling at Newcastle and Port Stephens.

The evacuation of Norfolk Island, commenced in 1804, was not completed until 1813.

"Lady Nelson" made three voyages to VDL between 1807 and 1813, the first in 1807 carried 35 men, women, and children from Norfolk Island to Hobart Town. The 15 men and one woman had been convicts sent to Norfolk Island but were now free settlers. Her second voyage was in 1808 when she carried 25 men women and child from Norfolk Island to Hobart Town. Her last voyage from Norfolk Island to Port Dalrymple was in 1813 when she carried 43 men women and children.

Lady Nelson left Port Jackson in December 1812, and a hired ship, Minstrel, left in January 1813. After embarking the settlers at Norfolk Island, both vessels had arrived in Port Dalrymple by 4 March 1813.

Governor Macquarie left Sydney on 21 February 1816 and travelled overland to Windsor. He returned on board Lady Nelson to see the progress of the settlements along the Hawkesbury River and arrived back in Sydney on 26 February.

On 8 May 1819 Lady Nelson, accompanied by Mermaid, left Port Jackson to carry out a survey of the entrance to Port Macquarie. On board was the Surveyor General, Lieutenant John Oxley RN, who had discovered and named the entrance during an overland expedition the previous year.

A decision was subsequently taken to establish a settlement at Port Macquarie. The establishment comprised 60 convicts and a detachment of 40 troops. They left Sydney on 21 March 1821 on board Lady Nelson, Prince Regent, and Mermaid. The passage was unusually long due to adverse winds. While entering the river on 17 April Lady Nelson struck a sunken rock, but soon got off. Prince Regent also sustained damage, and Mermaid got aground the next day in crossing the bar, losing her rudder in the process. Lady Nelson was quickly repaired and ordered to return to Sydney to get help to repair the other two vessels but ran aground on rocks inside the bar when departing on 2 May 1821. Her rudder and stern-post were lost and her hull filled with water at high tide due to damaged planking. Lady Nelson was eventually repaired but did not return to Port Jackson until 1 May 1822, after an absence of 13 months.

In 1824 the Secretary of State for War and the Colonies directed that a settlement be formed on the north-west coast of the continent. The settlement was to cover Coburg Peninsula and Melville and Bathurst Islands.

The expedition embarked on HMS Tamar, Captain Bremer, the transport ship Countess of Harcourt, Captain Bunn, and Lady Nelson, Mr Johns, Master. The three vessels sailed on 24 August 1824 and anchored in a cove in the strait between Melville Island and Bathurst Island. The cove was named King's Cove, and the expedition chose the south-east point of the cove for the settlement, and named it Point Barlow. The entrance to the anchorage was named Port Cockburn. Parties were sent ashore on 1 October to clear the ground and lay the foundations of a fort that they called Fort Dundas. On 8 September construction began on a pier to land provisions and heavy stores.

The establishment was in place by 10 November, and on 13 November 1824 Countess of Harcourt and Tamar departed, leaving Captain Maurice Barlow of the 3rd Regiment of Foot (the Buffs), in charge. Lady Nelson remained as a guard and supply ship.

The settlement possessed rations for twelve months but there was no fresh meat. In December 1824, Barlow sent Lady Nelson and George Miller, who was responsible for maintaining a supply of provisions, to the Dutch settlement at Kupang on the island of Timor for supplies. Miller procured some buffaloes and goats, but most of the animals died before she returned to the settlement on 2 January 1825.

Within a week, Lady Nelson departed again to procure more livestock and whilst at Koepang, Miller encountered the schooner Stedcombe, bound from England to the new settlement at Melville Island. Lady Nelson returned with thirty small pigs that were lean and unfit for immediate use. During the five weeks Lady Nelson had been away scurvy had made its appearance among the prisoners, which made it imperative to obtain fresh provisions. Lady Nelson therefore sailed again, with directions from Barlow that Johns purchase whatever livestock he could get.

When Stedcombe arrived at Port Cockburn, her Master entered into an agreement with Barlow to land, at the settlement, a cargo of buffalo, averaging 250 pounds (113 kg) in weight each, for a price of 25 Spanish Dollars each, and binding him to return in five weeks.

Lady Nelson departed on the 19th and Stedcombe on 23 February 1825. In a letter dated 19 May 1825, Barlow wrote 'his schooner [Stedcombe] left this port four days after Johns' departure [in Lady Nelson], in charge of his Chief Mate, neither have returned since. I fear they either have been wrecked or fallen into the hands of the Malay Pirates'.

== Final resting place ==
Brief reports of the fate of the Lady Nelson appeared in the Gazette over the next few months:

The Lady Nelson, brig, had been most unfortunately cut off at Timor by the Malay privateers, and all the crew sacrificed, save the Captain.

By the arrival of the Faith, we learn, that the Lady Nelson had been despatched from Melville Island for fresh provisions to some of the islands in the neighbourhood of Timor, with instructions to avoid an island named Babba [Babar], where they would be great danger of her being cut off. This advice, however, unfortunately was not adhered to, but whether it was so by accident or design, we have not ascertained; the result is certain. Every soul on board, we regret to state, was cruelly massacred, and the hull of the vessel was seen some time after with the name painted on her stern. (Note: The settlement at Melville Island was abandoned in 1828.)

A gun, said to have been on Lady Nelson when she was lost, was examined in the village of Tutawawang, on Babar Island, in 1981 but no definitive conclusions appear to have been reached as to its provenance.

== Replica vessels ==
=== Mount Gambier Replica (1986) ===
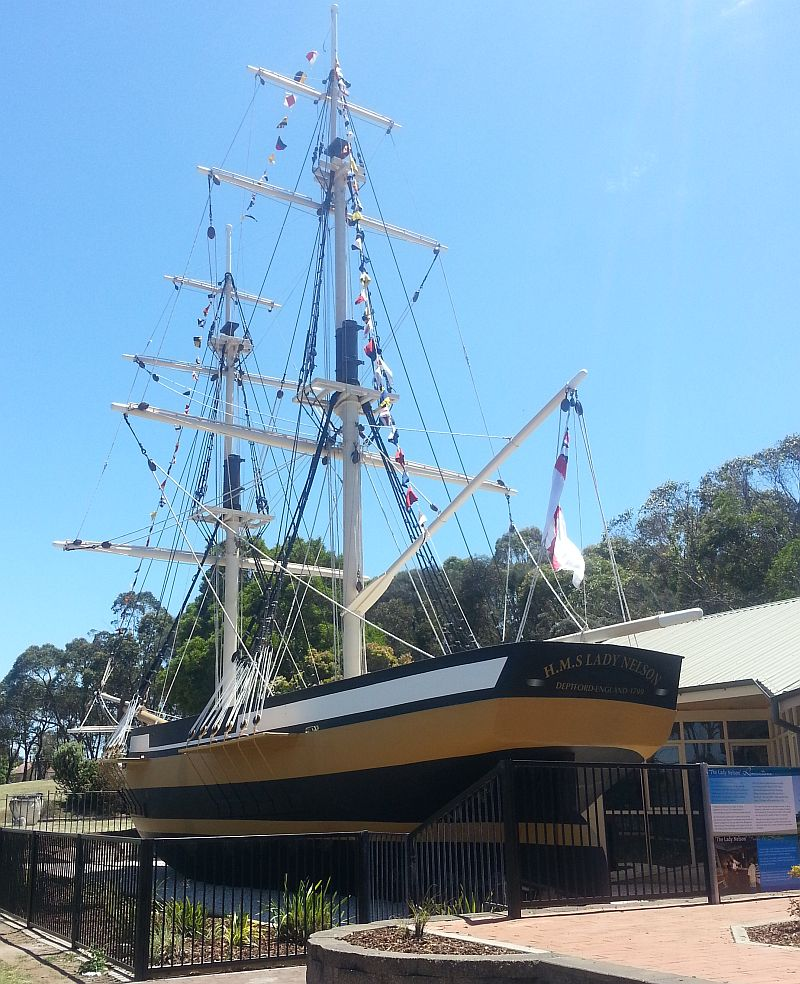
Replica at The Mount Gambier Visitor Centre, Mount Gambier

The Mount Gambier Visitor Centre, Mount Gambier, South Australia, in 1986 built a full size non-sailing, replica of Lady Nelson in association with the commemoration of the 150th anniversary of the proclamation of the colony of South Australia on 28 December 1836. In 2011 a survey of the replica found extensive rot in the hull timbers that put her beyond repair.

The Maritime Village Boatyard, at Flagstaff Hill Maritime Village, Warrnambool, Victoria, was commissioned to assess the condition of the replica and develop a plan for her restoration. The restoration completely replaced the hull with a fiberglass sheathed structure and the timber lower masts with galvanised steel. The existing upper masts, spars and rigging were retained.

The rebuilt replica was transported from Warrnambool to Mount Gambier by road and mounted on a concrete slab; it now forms a tourist attraction at the Visitor Centre. (Note: The story of the Mount Gambier Replica is based on information on the websites of The Mount Gambier Visitor Centre and the Maritime Village Boatyard.)

=== Tasmanian Sail Training Association Replica (1988) ===
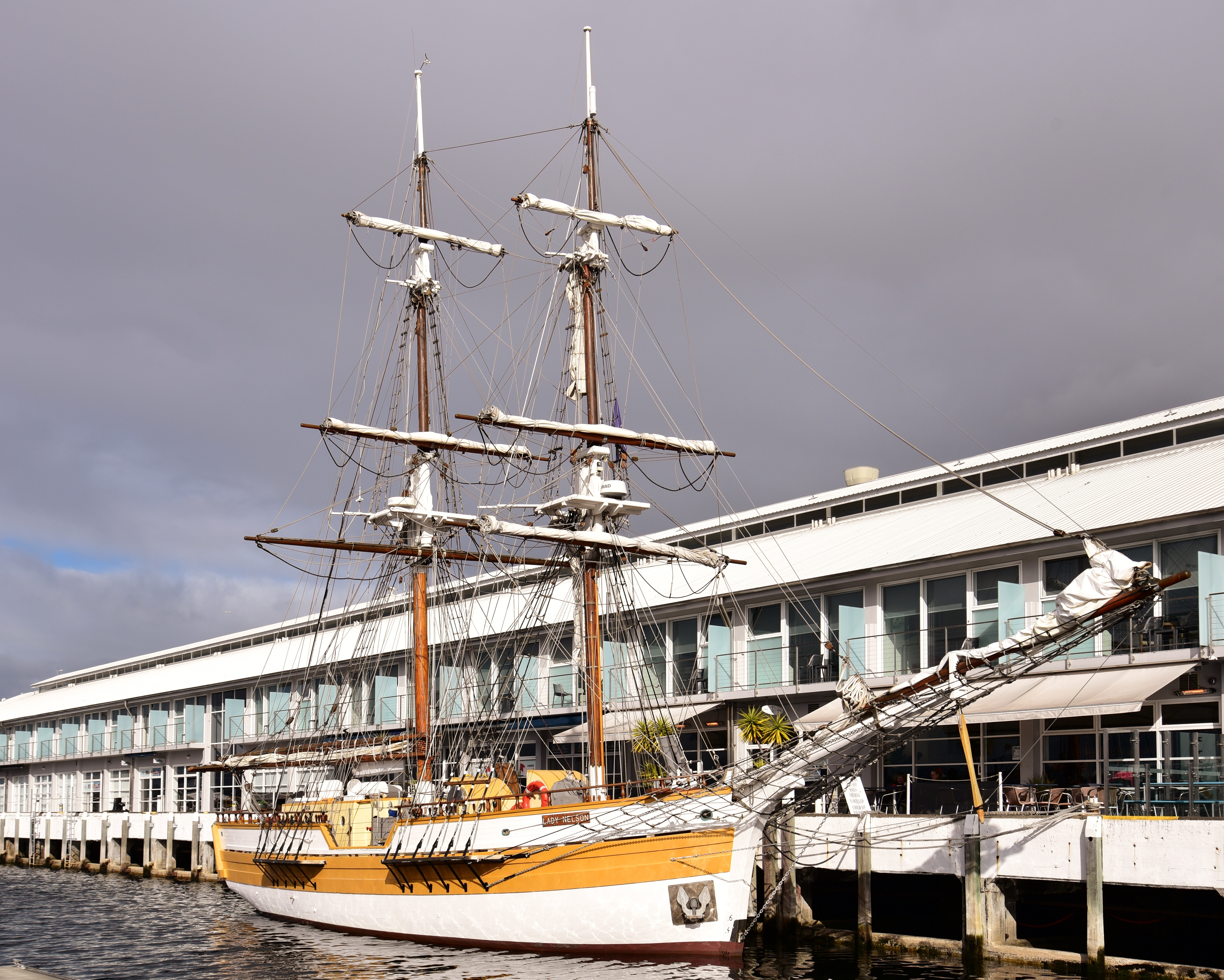
Replica of the Lady Nelson in Hobart

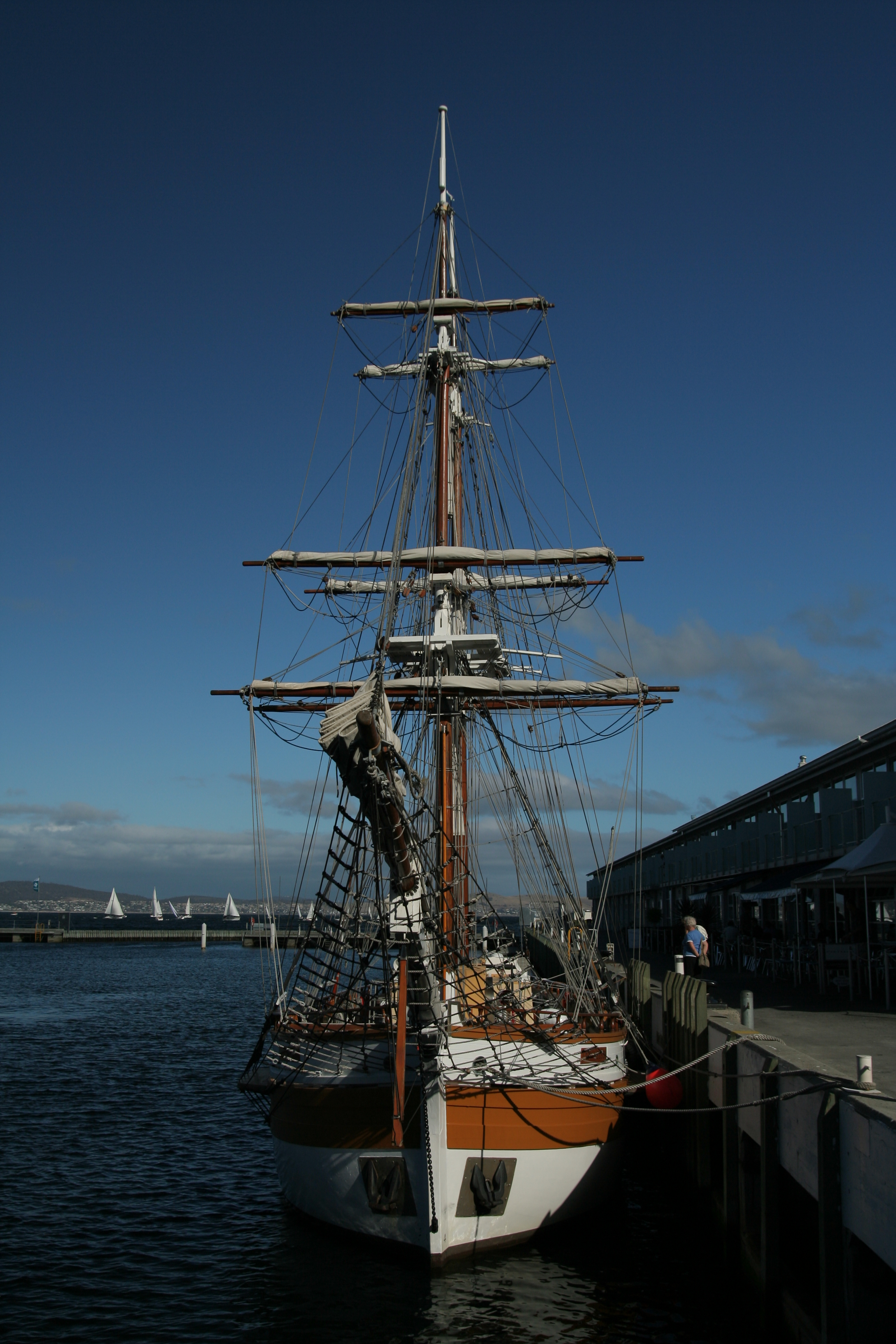
Replica of the Lady Nelson in Hobart

The Tasmanian Sail Training Association was established to build and sail a replica of the Lady Nelson as part of the celebrations to mark the 200th anniversary of the European settlement of Australia in January 1788. She was built at a cost of more than $700,000 largely funded by Tasmanian taxpayers via the State Government, with assistance from local and corporate sponsors.

Ray Kemp built the replica at Woodbridge near Hobart in Tasmania. He built it largely from Tasmanian-grown timbers: blue gum keel and frames, celery-top pine deck, and Douglas fir lower masts. The spars are American-grown Oregon.

Kemp launched Lady Nelson on 29 November 1987. A commissioning ceremony was held on 17 December 1988 and the replica went on its first cruise, on the River Derwent, in March 1989.

From July 1990 to early 1996 the replica Lady Nelson went on several voyages during the cold Tasmanian winter, across Bass Strait to Victoria, New South Wales, and Queensland.The vessel also followed the fleets of the Melbourne to Hobart yacht race in 1993 and 1994. In more recent times the vessel has travelled:

- January 1998, to Sydney to participate in the Tall Ships Race to Hobart and on its return carried out a circumnavigation of Tasmania.
- Late 2000, to Portland in Victoria to commemorate the passage of the Lady Nelson through Bass Strait in December 1800.
- March 2001, to Western Port to re-enact the Lady Nelson's first entry into the port in March 1801.
- On 14 February 2002 the replica sailed into Port Phillip Bay; exactly 200 years to the day after the Lady Nelson's entry into the bay.
- In 2003 the replica visited Sorrento in Port Phillip Bay to commemorate the arrival of the first settlers in Port Phillip, on the ships Ocean and Calcutta, in October 1803.

== Notes ==
=== References ===
- Australian Joint Copying Project (AJCP)
- Bladen, F. M. (ed.) (1897). Historical Records of New South Wales. (HRNSW) Sydney.
- Boyle, P. (1799). Boyles View of London and its Environs; or a complete list of all the squares, streets, lanes, courts, yards, alleys, &c ... . London.
- Cusick, Audrey (2007). A Noble Achievement in Tasmania: a condensed history of the sail training vessel Lady Nelson celebrating twenty years since the launching. Tasmanian Sail Training Association Ltd.
- Flinders, Matthew (1814). A Voyage to Terra Australis undertaken for the purpose of completing the discovery of that vast country, and prosecuted in the years 1801, 1802 and 1803 in His Majesty's Ship the Investigator and ... Volume I. London.
- Flinders, Matthew (1814). A Voyage to Terra Australis undertaken for the purpose of completing the discovery of that vast country, and prosecuted in the years 1801, 1802 and 1803 in His Majesty's Ship the Investigator and ... Volume II. London.
- Grant, James (1803). The narrative of a voyage of discovery, performed in His Majesty's vessel the Lady Nelson, of sixty tons burthen: with sliding keels, in the years 1800, 1801, and 1802, to New South Wales. Printed by C. Roworth for T. Egerton. ISBN 978-0-7243-0036-5.
- Knopwood, Robert; Nicholls, Mary ed. (1977). The Diary of the Reverend Robert Knopwood, 1803–1838: First chaplain of Van Diemen's Land. Tasmanian Historical Research Association. ISBN 0909479097.
- Labilliere, Francis Peter (1878). Early History of the Colony of Victoria from its discovery to its establishment as a self-governing Province of the British Empire. London.
- Lee, Ida (1915). The Logbooks of the Lady Nelson, with the journal of her first commander Lieutenant James Grant. London: Grafton. OL 6580132M.
- Lowndes, H. (1799). A London Directory or alphabetical arrangement; containing the names and residences of the merchants, manufacturers, and principal traders, in the metropolis and its environs ... London.
- Lysons, Daniel (1796), The Environs of London: Being An Historical Account of the Towns, Villages, and Hamlets within twelve miles of that capital. London.
- Mitchell Library, Sydney, Australia. (ML)
- The National Archives of England and Wales, Kew (TNA)
- Naval Chronicle. Published Monthly between 1799 and 1818.
- Spillet, Peter (1982). The discovery of the relics of H.M. Colonial Brig Lady Nelson and the schooner Stedcombe. Darwin: Historical Society of the Northern Territory, ISBN 0959970215.
- Sprod, Dan (2001). The usurper: Jorgen Jorgenson and his turbulent life in Iceland and Van Diemen's Land, 1780–1841. Sandy Bay, Tas., Australia: Blubber Head Press. ISBN 0-908528-29-9. OCLC 48435362.
- State Records Authority of New South Wales, Sydney (SRA)
- Steel, D. Original and Correct List of the Royal Navy, Revenue-Cutters, and Gun-Boats with their Commanders and Stations.
- Sydney Gazette and New South Wales Advertiser (Gazette). Australia's first newspaper, first published on 5 Mar. 1803.
- Watson, F. (ed.) (1915–1925). Historical Records of Australia. (HRA) Sydney.
- Winfield, Rif (2008). British Warships in the Age of Sail 1793–1817: Design, Construction, Careers and Fates. Seaforth Publishing. ISBN 978-1-86176-246-7.
