= HMS Buffalo (1797) =

History

Great Britain
- Name: HMS Buffalo
- Builder: John Dudman, Deptford, London
- Launched: 3 November 1797
- Acquired: 16 August 1797
- In service: 1797
- Out of service: 1814
- Fate: Sold 1817

General characteristics
- Tons burthen: 462 66/94 (bm)
- Length: 109 ft 2 in (33.27 m) (overall); 90 ft 6 1/4 in (27.591 m) (keel)
- Beam: 31 ft (9.4 m)
- Depth of hold: 13 ft 2 in (4.01 m)
- Propulsion: Sail
- Complement: 33
- Armament: 10 × 6-pounder guns

HMS Buffalo was a storeship under construction as the merchant vessel Fremantle when the Royal Navy purchased her on the stocks. She was launched in 1797, and sold in 1817.

== Career ==
In December 1797 William Raven was appointed commander for a voyage from England to New South Wales. Between 1792 and 1797 he had visited New South Wales and sailed between Australia and the Cape, Bengal, and Java as captain of the merchant ship Britannia.

Buffalo arrived at Port Jackson on 25 April 1799, having brought cattle from the Cape of Good Hope. She left for the Cape on 13 September 1799. She returned on 15 April 1800 with more cattle from the Cape.

On 21 October 1800, she sailed for England under the command of William Kent. (Earlier, in 1795) he had brought out Supply to the colony and commanded her there for some years.)

Buffalo left Port Jackson carrying Captain John Hunter, the former governor of New South Wales, Eliza Kent who had been his First Lady and William and Eliza's three children. She also carried two black swans and three emus, all five of which survived to reach England. From St Helena she escorted a small convoy of vessels from the East Indies, one of which was carrying Colonel Robert Brooke, the former governor of St Helena.

Under Kent Buffalo sailed from England to return to Australia, arriving with stores on 16 October 1802. She left on 21 April 1803, bound for Bengal. Kent and Buffalo returned from Bengal with cattle, arriving on 12 June 1804, or 13 June.

In 1803/4 they were in New Caledonia and in 1804 Buffalo was involved in establishing the settlement at George Town, Tasmania by William Paterson. Eliza Kent's journeys on board the Buffalo was later reported in a British magazine.

In 1805 she was commanded by John Oxley. On 10 February 1807 Buffalo left Port Jackson for England.

On 26 October 1807, Tsar Alexander I of Russia declared war on Great Britain. The official news did not arrive there until 2 December, at which time the British declared an embargo on all Russian vessels in British ports. Buffalo was one of some 70 vessels that shared in the proceeds of the seizure of the 44-gun Russian frigate Speshnoy (Speshnyy), and the Russian storeship Wilhelmina (or Vilghemina) then in Portsmouth harbour. The Russian vessels were carrying the payroll for Vice-Admiral Dmitry Senyavin’s squadron in the Mediterranean. (Note: Consequently, an able seaman on any one of the 70 British vessels received 14s 7½d in prize money.)

== Fate ==
Buffalo was hulked in 1814. The "Principal Officers and Commissioners of His Majesty's Navy" first offered the "Buffalo sloop, of 463 tons", lying at Cowes, for sale on 3 April 1817. She sold on 30 April 1817 for £810 to Mr. Spartly.

== See also ==
- John Lewin, who intended to sail to Sydney on Buffalo in 1798 but missed the departure although his wife was aboard.
- Garnham Blaxcell, who was serving as acting purser on 16 October 1802 when Buffalo arrived in Sydney.
- Charles Robbins, who served on Buffalo as a midshipman in 1802
