= HMS Reliance (1793) =

History

Great Britain
- Name: HMS Reliance
- Launched: South Shields
- Acquired: December 1793
- Fate: Sold on 12 October 1815

General characteristics
- Class & type: Discovery vessel
- Tons burthen: 394 bm
- Length: 90 ft (27 m)
- Beam: 30 ft (9.1 m)
- Propulsion: Sails
- Sail plan: Full-rigged ship
- Complement: 59

HMS Reliance was a discovery vessel of the Royal Navy. She became famous as one of the ships with the early explorations of the Australian coast and other the southern Pacific islands.

Reliance was at Plymouth on 20 January 1795 and so shared in the proceeds of the detention of the Dutch naval vessels, East Indiamen, and other merchant vessels that were in port on the outbreak of war between Britain and the Netherlands.

Commanded by Henry Waterhouse sailed Reliance to New South Wales, arriving in Sydney on 7 September 1795. Among her crew and passengers were midshipman Matthew Flinders, the ship's doctor George Bass, the new Governor John Hunter, and the Aboriginal Bennelong. She later returned to Sydney, arriving on 26 June 1797 from the Cape of Good Hope, carrying stores ordered by Governor Hunter and merino sheep purchased at the Cape by Henry Waterhouse. Henry Waterhouse the captain of the Reliance and Lt. William Kent, nephew of Governor John Hunter, bought 26 merinos from the widow of the widow of Colonel Gordon, who had imported Spanish sheep to the Cape. She offered the flock for sale, but the Commissary John Palmer had refused them. Waterhouse and Lieutenant William Kent then bought twenty-six and although the return voyage was very stormy and slow, more than half of Waterhouse's stock survived to reach Sydney in June 1797. These were the first merino sheep imported into the colony, and Waterhouse supplied lambs to many of the settlers including John Macarthur and Samuel Marsden. Waterhouse had bought a property on the bank of the Parramatta River, the Vineyard, and the sheep lived there until he left the colony in March 1800 when most of the flock was sold to William Cox.

Reliance was the first ship to chart the Antipodes Islands, in March 1800. Reliance was relegated to harbour service that year, surviving for another 15 years before being sold on 12 October 1815.

== See also ==
- Trim (cat)
