= John Hunter (Royal Navy officer) =

Royal Navy officer and colonial administrator (1737–1821)

Vice-Admiral John Hunter
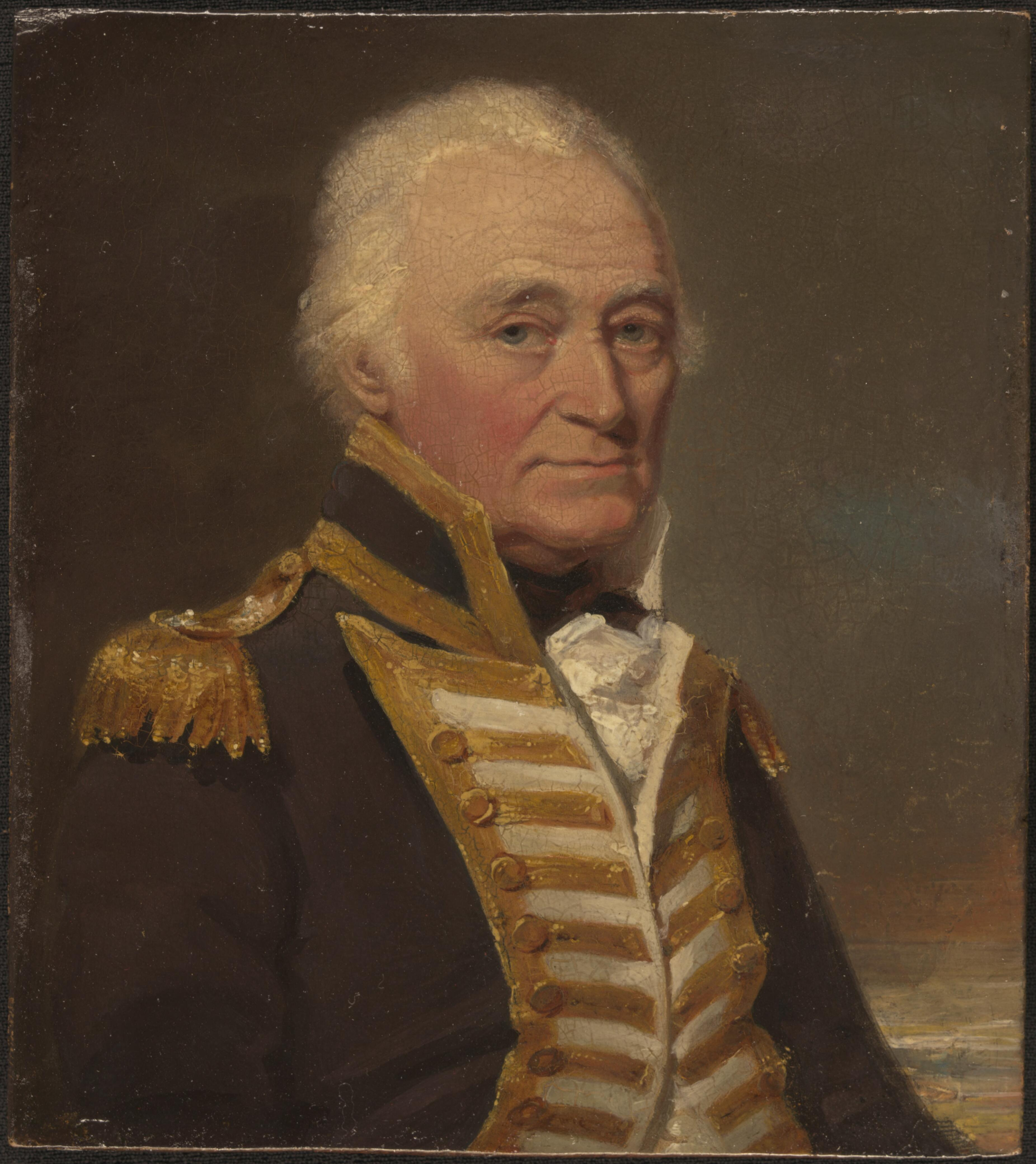
- Portrait, c. 1812

2nd Governor of New South Wales
- In office 11 September 1795 – 28 September 1800
- Monarch: George III
- Preceded by: Arthur Phillip
- Succeeded by: Philip Gidley King

Personal details
- Born: 29 August 1737 Leith, Edinburgh, Scotland
- Died: 13 March 1821 (aged 83) Hackney, London, England
- Resting place: Church of St John-at-Hackney
- Relations: William Kent (nephew); Eliza Kent (nephew's wife); William George Carlile Kent (great-nephew)

Military service
- Allegiance: Kingdom of Great Britain
- Branch/service: Royal Navy
- Rank: Vice-Admiral of the Red
- Commands: HMS Marquis de Seignelay; HMS Sirius; HMS Venerable
- Battles/wars: Seven Years' War; Raid on Rochefort; Capture of Quebec; American Revolutionary War; Battle of Dogger Bank; Relief of Gibraltar; Battle of Cape Spartel; French Revolutionary Wars; Glorious First of June; Australian Frontier Wars; Napoleonic Wars

Vice-Admiral John Hunter (29 August 1737 – 13 March 1821) was an officer of the Royal Navy, who succeeded Arthur Phillip as the second Governor of New South Wales, serving from 1795 to 1800.

Both a sailor and a scholar, he explored the Parramatta River as early as 1788, and was the first to surmise that Tasmania might be an island. As governor, he tried to combat serious abuses by the military in the face of powerful local interests led by John MacArthur. Hunter's name is commemorated in historic locations such as Hunter Valley and Hunter Street, Sydney.

== Family and early life ==
John Hunter was born in Leith, Scotland, the son of William Hunter, a captain in the merchant service, and Helen, née Drummond, daughter of J. Drummond and niece of George Drummond, several-time lord provost of Edinburgh. Hunter was sent to the University of Edinburgh, but soon left it to join the navy as a captain's servant to Thomas Knackston on HMS Grampus in May 1754.

== Naval career ==
=== Seven Years' War ===
In 1755 Hunter was enrolled as seaman on HMS Centaur, became a midshipman and served on HMS Union and then HMS Neptune. While aboard Neptune he was present at the Raid on Rochefort in 1757, and afterwards served during cruises off Brest in 1758 and the capture of Quebec in 1759. Serving aboard Neptune at this time as her first lieutenant was John Jervis, later Earl of St Vincent and First Sea Lord, who became an acquaintance of Hunter.

Hunter spent the rest of the Seven Years' War as midshipman on several of Admiral Philip Durell's flagships, serving aboard HMS Royal Anne, HMS Princess Amelia and the 100-gun HMS Royal George, the latter in the Bay of Biscay until the Treaty of Paris ended the war in 1763. Hunter passed examinations and qualified for promotion to lieutenant in February 1760. Hunter remained active in the navy during the years of peace, going out to Newfoundland aboard the frigate HMS Tweed and then serving as master's mate aboard HMS Launceston during her time in North America in 1767 with the fleet under Commodore Samuel Hood. Hood gave Hunter an acting-order as master in 1768, and after passing his exams with Trinity House in 1769, Hunter had the order confirmed. His first appointment was to the 28-gun HMS Carysfort for service in the West Indies. Hunter spent his time there making charts and plans of parts of the coast and of the Spanish fortifications at Havana, which he sent back to the Admiralty. Carysfort was nearly lost after running aground on Martyr Reef in the Gulf of Florida in 1771, while being sailed by a pilot, but Hunter's exertions allowed her to be saved with the loss of her masts and guns.

=== Service in the East Indies ===
Hunter served as master of HMS Intrepid in the East Indies between 1772 and 1775, after which he became master of HMS Kent. The Kent was at this time commanded by Captain John Jervis, Hunter's companion from HMS Neptune. Jervis took Hunter with him to his next command, HMS Foudroyant. Also serving aboard Foudroyant at this time was Evan Nepean, then the ship's purser, but later a leading civil servant and First Secretary to the Admiralty. From Foudroyant Hunter was moved into HMS Eagle in 1776, at the request of Admiral Lord Howe, who was then going out to North America as commander-in-chief of the fleet, with Eagle as his flagship.

=== American War of Independence ===
When the American Revolutionary War broke out, Hunter served under Howe for the duration of his time in command, acting virtually as master of the fleet. He was active in the Chesapeake raid and the expeditions on the Delaware, as well as the defence of Sandy Hook. On Howe's recall, his reputation by now stale with the Sandwich administration, Hunter was not able to have his request to be made lieutenant honoured. Instead he joined the 74-gun HMS Berwick as a volunteer in 1779, under her captain, Keith Stewart. He was appointed lieutenant of HMS Union by Sir Charles Hardy, but the Admiralty refused to confirm the appointment and Hunter returned to the Berwick as a volunteer in 1780, and went out the West Indies. There he received a commission from the commander in chief, Sir George Rodney. Hunter returned to England aboard the Berwick in 1781, and was present at the Battle of Dogger Bank on 5 August that year. Howe appointed him third lieutenant of his flagship HMS Victory in 1782, and was advanced to first lieutenant by the time she took part in the relief of Gibraltar and the Battle of Cape Spartel. Following these engagements Hunter was appointed to his first command, that of the 14-gun sloop Marquis de Seignelay, on 12 November 1782.

=== First Fleet ===
When the preparation of the First Fleet was in progress, Lord Howe, by then first lord of the admiralty, arranged for Hunter to be promoted to post captain on 15 December 1786, and appointed to command HMS Sirius. The fleet was under the overall command of Commodore Arthur Phillip who was going out to found and be governor of the new colony of New South Wales. Hunter carried a dormant commission as successor to Phillip if he should have died or was absent.

== Explorations around Australia and Tasmania ==
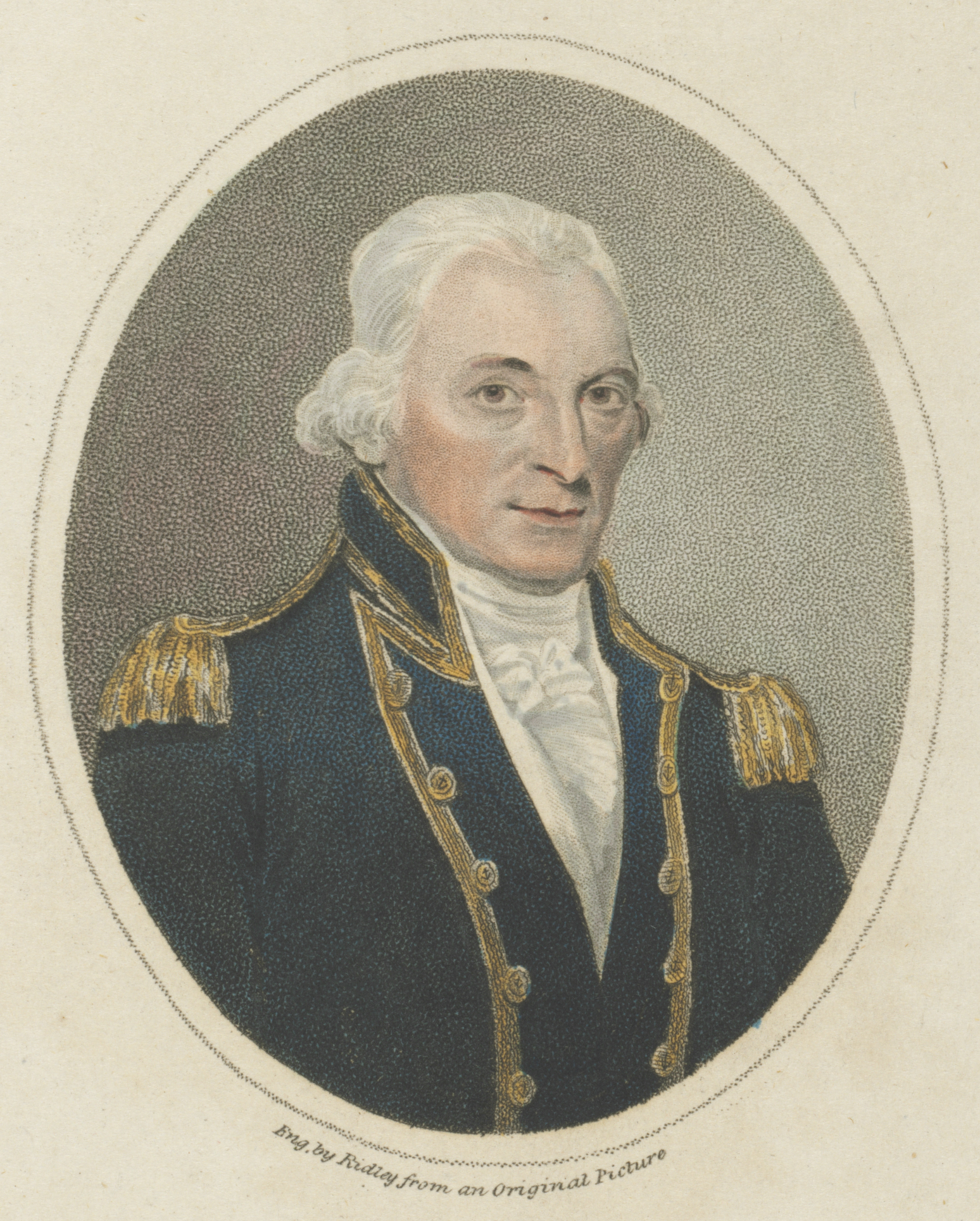
Captain John Hunter, Governor of New South Wales, 1801

The expedition arrived in Port Jackson in January 1788. Hunter led an expedition to explore the Parramatta River early in 1788. This expedition explored and made soundings as far as Iron Cove, Five Dock Bay and Hen & Chicken Bay on the Parramatta River. The Sir William Dixson Research Library at the State Library of New South Wales holds the original copy of the chart of the expedition, entitled "Chart of the coasts and harbours of Botany-Bay, Port-Jackson and Broken-Bay, as survey'd by Capt.n John Hunter of H.M.S. Sirius". The expedition was significant because it may have marked the first contact to take place between the British and the Indigenous people of the land, the Wangal Clan, in 1788. William Bradley's log says that this contact took place while Hunter was having breakfast and is remembered in the name of the suburb, Breakfast Point.

Hunter was ordered to the Cape of Good Hope for supplies in October 1788. He sailed around Cape Horn to the Cape of Good Hope, and from there back to New South Wales in May 1789, thus circumnavigating the globe. The voyage was made more difficult by leaky state of the ship, which rendered continual pumping necessary. Sirius was then refitted and sent to Norfolk Island with a large party of convicts, but was caught in a violent storm while anchored there. She was driven onto a coral reef and wrecked. A number of the crew returned to Port Jackson aboard the brig HMS Supply, the remainder, including Hunter, waited for nearly a year on the island before being taken off. Hunter and some of his men returned to England aboard the chartered Dutch vessel Waaksamheyd after a long and arduous voyage. Finally arriving at Portsmouth in April 1792, Hunter was court-martialled for the loss of the Sirius but was honourably acquitted.

The French Revolutionary Wars having broken out during Hunter's time in England, he went to sea again as a volunteer aboard the 100-gun HMS Queen Charlotte, the flagship of his old patron Lord Howe. Hunter was present at the Glorious First of June on 1 June 1794, and remained in the ship until 1795. With Arthur Phillip's resignation from the governorship of New South Wales in July 1793, Hunter had applied for the position in October and was appointed governor in January 1794. Various delays occurred, and it was not until February 1795 that he was able to sail. Hunter arrived at Sydney on 7 September 1795 on HMS Reliance and took up the office of governor on 11 September 1795.

== Governorship ==
Hunter's difficulties began before he arrived back in Sydney. Phillip left the colony in 1792, at the end of his term as governor, and for the following two years the military were in complete control.

A contemporary, midshipman Daniel Southwell described Hunter as "devoid of stiff pride, most accomplished in his profession, and, to sum up all, a worthy man." His service as Governor was ultimately recognised through the grant of an annual pension of £300, approved by then-Prime Minister Henry Addington in October 1802.

When the platypus was first seen by Europeans in 1798, a pelt and sketch were sent back to the United Kingdom by John Hunter.

== Later life and legacy ==
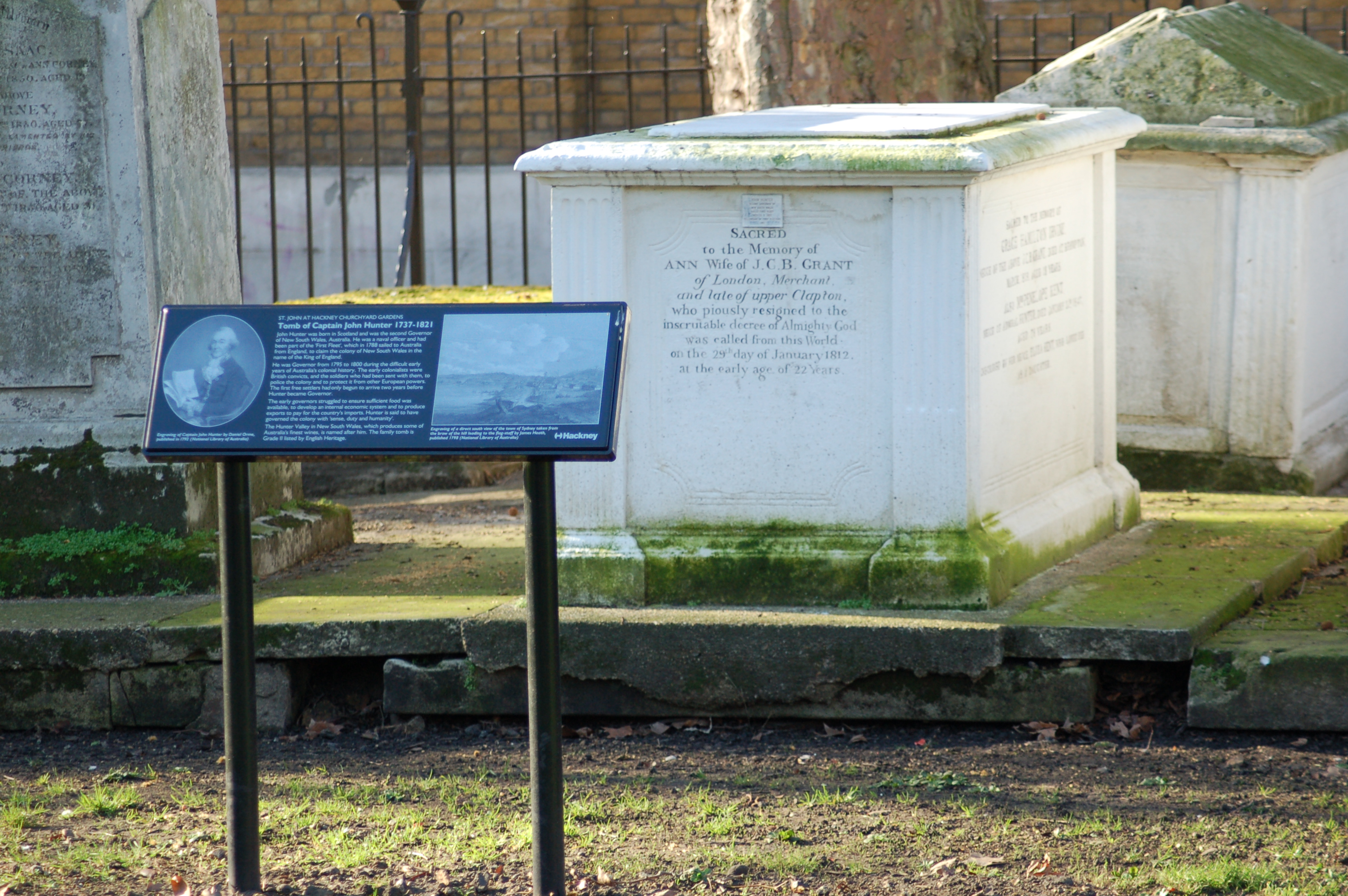
Hunter's tomb in the graveyard of the Church of St John-at-Hackney in London

In summer 1804 Hunter was given command of the 74-gun HMS Venerable, serving with the fleet off Brest under Admiral William Cornwallis. While sailing out of Torbay on the evening of 24 November, a sudden fog came down. The ships of the fleet, unaware of each other's positions and their own location became disorganised. Hunter twice narrowly avoided colliding with other ships, but ran aground at 8pm on the cliff near Paignton, and soon afterwards bilged. A gale then struck the area, and with Venerable fast going to pieces, her crew were evacuated with little loss by HMS Impetueux. Hunter again underwent a court-martial, and was again fully acquitted.

Hunter was promoted to rear-admiral on 2 October 1807, and then to vice-admiral on 31 July 1810 but never hoisted his flag at sea. Vice-Admiral John Hunter spent his final years in his home town of Leith, living at 6 Cassels Place. He died at his London home at Judd Street, New Road, Hackney, London on 13 March 1821. His tomb can be seen in the churchyard of St John-at-Hackney.

The Hunter River and Hunter Valley north of Sydney are both named after him, as is the suburb of Hunters Hill in Sydney, the John Hunter Hospital in Newcastle, and the federal Division of Hunter. In 1986 he was honoured on a postage stamp depicting his portrait issued by Australia Post. HMAS Hunter the lead ship of the new Hunter-Class frigates of the Royal Australian Navy is named after him. The Hunter was laid down in 2023 and is expected to be commissioned in 2031.

He retired to his home town of Leith and lived at a then-new Georgian house at 5 Cassels Place, part of the still extant Georgian terrace at the foot of Leith Walk, and now renumbered as 34 Leith Walk.

== Memorials ==
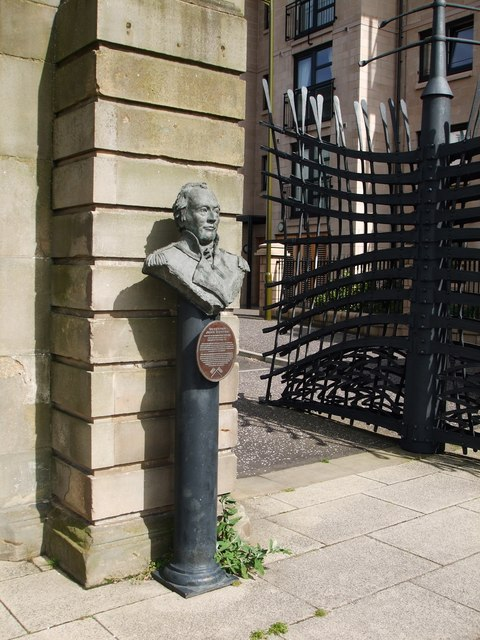
Bust of Admiral John Hunter in Leith

A bust of Hunter was placed by the Australian government at the north end of The Shore in Leith in 1996.

== See also ==
- Historical Records of Australia
- Journals of the First Fleet

== Notes ==
=== Bibliography ===
- Bladen, F. M., ed. (1978). Historical records of New South Wales. Vol. 2. Grose and Paterson, 1793–1795. Lansdown Slattery & Co. ISBN 0868330035.
- Bladen, F. M., ed. (1979). Historical records of New South Wales. Vol. 4, Hunter and King, 1800, 1801, 1802. Lansdown Slattery & Co. ISBN 0868330051.

Government offices
Preceded by Arthur Phillip	Governor of New South Wales; 1795–1800	Succeeded by Philip Gidley King
