= List of ship launches in 1803 =

The list of ship launches in 1803 includes a chronological list of some ships launched in 1803.

Date	Ship	Class	Builder	Location	Country	Notes
8 January	Huddart	East Indiaman	Perry, Wells & Green	Blackwall	United Kingdom	For British East India Company.
8 January	Lady Castlereagh	East Indiaman	Randall	Rotherhithe	United Kingdom	For British East India Company.
8 January	Union	East Indiaman	Randall	Rotherhithe	United Kingdom	For British East India Company.
24 January	Brutus	Téméraire-class ship of the line		Lorient	France	For French Navy.
24 January	Cumbrian	Merchantman		Bombay	India	For Bruce, Fawcett & Co.
25 January	Europe	East Indiaman	Perry	Blackwall	United Kingdom	For British East India Company.
January	Charlotte Dundas	Paddle steamer	John Allan	Glasgow	United Kingdom	For William Symington.
5 February	Ceylon	East Indiaman	Pitcher	Northfleet	United Kingdom	For British East India Company.
7 February	Essex	East Indiaman	Perry	Blackwall	United Kingdom	For British East India Company.
8 February	Mangles	Merchantman	Hudson, Bacon & Co	Calcutta	India	For Buckles & Co.
8 February	Prince of Wales	East Indiaman	Peter Everitt Mestaer	Rotherhithe	United Kingdom	For British East India Company.
February	Betsey and Sally	Fishing vessel		Whitby	United Kingdom	For private owner.
February	Brotherly Love's Increase	Merchantman		Whitby	United Kingdom	For private owner.
February	Nercus	West Indiaman		Whitby	United Kingdom	For private owner.
February	Neva	Merchantman		Whitby	United Kingdom	For private owner.
February	Resolution	Whaler		Whitby	United Kingdom	For private owner.
February	Robert and Ann	Collier		Whitby	United Kingdom	For private owner.
February	Sally	Fishing vessel		Whitby	United Kingdom	For private owner.
February	Sovereign	Merchantman		Whitby	United Kingdom	For private owner.
February	Visitor	collier		Whitby	United Kingdom	For private owner.
9 March	Lord Melville	East Indiaman	Dudman	Deptford	United Kingdom	For British East India Company.
22 April	Alexander	East Indiaman	Grayson	Liverpool	United Kingdom	For British East India Company.
22 April	Patent	Merchantman	Mr. Bradley	King's Lynn	United Kingdom	For private owner.
23 April	Colossus	Colossus-class ship of the line	Sir Henry Peake	Deptford Dockyard	United Kingdom	For Royal Navy.
7 May	Liogkii	Speshni-class frigate	G. Ignatyev	Solombala Shipyard, Arkhangelsk	Russia	For Imperial Russian Navy.
6 June	Euryalus	Apollo-class frigate	Balthazar & Edward Adams	Bucklers Hard	United Kingdom	For Royal Navy.
7 June	Euphrates	East Indiaman	Francis Hurry & Co.	Newcastle upon Tyne	United Kingdom	For British East India Company.
25 June	Vixen	Schooner	William Price	Baltimore, Maryland	United States	For United States Navy.
June	Cumberland	Merchantman	W. & J. Richards	Hythe	United Kingdom	For private owner.
June	Zephyrus	Brig	W. Potts	Sunderland	United Kingdom	For private owner.
5 July	Tribune	Fifth rate		Bursledon	United Kingdom	For Royal Navy.
13 July	Bucentaure	Bucentaure-class ship of the line	Arsenal de Toulon	Toulon	France	For French Navy.
18 July	Vétéran	Téméraire-class ship of the line	Pierre Ozanne	Brest	France	For French Navy.
20 July	Gloire	Frigate	Mathurin Crucy	Nantes	France	For French Navy.
21 July	Repulse	Repulse-class ship of the line	Barnard and Roberts	Deptford	United Kingdom	For Royal Navy.
26 July	Christian VII	Second rate		Copenhagen	Denmark-Norway	For Dano-Norwegian Navy.
July	Expedition	Full-rigged ship			United Kingdom	For private owner.
July	Isla	Brig		Lympstone	United Kingdom	For private owner.
6 August	Suffolk	Merchantman	Hudson, Bacon & Co.	Calcutta	India	For private owner.
6 August	Syren	Brig	Nathaniel Hutton	Philadelphia, Pennsylvania	United States	For United States Navy.
9 August	Name unknown	Brig		Thorpe St Andrew	United Kingdom	For private owner.
15 August	Neptune	Bucentaure-class ship of the line		Toulon	France	For French Navy.
18 August	Hero	Fame-class ship of the line	Perry	Blackwall	United Kingdom	For Royal Navy.
18 August	Magnanime	Téméraire-class ship of the line		Rochefort	France	For French Navy.
21 August	Argus	Brig	Edmund Hartt	Boston, Massachusetts	United States	For United States Navy.
August	Harmony	Brigantine			United Kingdom	For private owner.
2 September	Shannon	Perseverance-class frigate	Josiah and Thomas Brindley	Frindsbury	United Kingdom	For Royal Navy.
3 September	Illustrious	Fame-class ship of the line	Randall & Brent	Rotherhithe	United Kingdom	For Royal Navy.
17 September	Suffren	Téméraire-class ship of the line	Mathurin Crucy	Lorient	France	For French Navy.
24 September	Cassard	Third rate	Pierre Ozanne	Brest	France	For French Navy.
24 September	Matilda	Merchantman		Calcutta	India	For private owner.
1 October	Hebe	Full-rigged ship	Breen	Chittagong	India	For private owner.
1 October	Vengeur	Océan-class ship of the line		Brest	France	For French Navy.
3 October	Name unknown	Merchantman	Fletcher & Co.	Maryport	United Kingdom	For private owner.
6 October	Indus	Merchantman	Simon Temple Jr.	South Shields	United Kingdom	For private owner.
13 October	Extremeña	Schooner		Guayaquil	(Spain) Viceroyalty of Peru	For Spanish Navy.
15 October	Winchelsea	East Indiaman	Perry, Wells & Green	Blackwall	United Kingdom	For British East India Company.
17 October	Scorpion	Cruizer-class brig-sloop	John King	Dover	United Kingdom	For Royal Navy.
28 October	338	Pinnace		Havre de Grâce	France	For French Navy.
31 October	Lord Forbes	West Indiaman	Troughton	Chester	United Kingdom	For Forbes & Co.
31 October	Woodhouse	Merchantman	R. Reay	South Hylton	United Kingdom	For Messrs. Terry & Sons.
October	Aurora	Frigate		Vlissingen	Batavian Republic	For Batavian Navy.
14 November	Iris	Frigate		Amsterdam	Batavian Republic	For Batavian Navy.
14 November	Orpheus	Fifth rate		Amsterdam	Batavian Republic	For Dutch Navy.
15 November	Hermione	Fifth rate	Antoine Geoffroy	Lorient	France	For French Navy.
30 November	James Sibbald	Merchantman		Bombay	India	For private owner.
31 December	Elisabeth	Merchantman	John Scott and Sons	Greenock	United Kingdom	For Messrs. Stirling, Gordon & Co.
December	Name unknown	Brigantine		Southwold	United Kingdom	For private owner.
Unknown date	Active	Brigantine		Peterhead	United Kingdom	For private owner.
Unknown date	Adolphe	Lugger		Dieppe	France	For M. Merlin-Dubreuil.
Unknown date	Adventure	Privateer			France	For private owner.
Unknown date	Alexander	Full-rigged ship		Bombay	India	For Charles Forbes & Co.
Unknown date	Alsace	Merchantman			France	For private owner.
Unknown date	Ann	Merchantman		Sunderland	United Kingdom	For private owner.
Unknown date	Ariadne	Merchantman		Cowes	United Kingdom	For private owner.
Unknown date	Badger	Cutter		Cowes	United Kingdom	For Board of Customs.
Unknown date	Bedford	Merchantman			Location unknown	For private owner.
Unknown date	Betsey	Merchantman		Chittagong	India	For Hogur & Co.
Unknown date	Bloys	Full-rigged ship			Batavian Republic	For Batavian Navy.
Unknown date	Brakel	Full-rigged ship			Batavian Republic	For Batavian Navy.
Unknown date	Britannia	Merchantman	J. Laing	Sunderland	United Kingdom	For private owner.
Unknown date	British Tar	Merchantman	Lockwood Brodrick	South Shields	United Kingdom	For T. Forrest.
Unknown date	Buccleuch	Ketch	Nicholas Bools & William Good	Bridport	United Kingdom	For Liddle & Co.
Unknown date	Cambrian	Full-rigged ship		Bombay	India	For private owner.
Unknown date	Cambridge	Merchantman	Francis Hurry	Howdon	United Kingdom	For Lord Camelford.
Unknown date	Charlotte	Merchantman		Bombay	India	For Alex Adamson.
Unknown date	Charlotte	Sloop		Sydney	(United Kingdom of Great Britain and Ireland) New South Wales	For Robert Inch.
Unknown date	City of Edinburgh	Merchantman	Henry Baldwin	Quebec City	(United Kingdom of Great Britain and Ireland) Lower Canada	For private owner.
Unknown date	Countess of Northesk	Smack	Nicholas Bools & William Good	Bridport	United Kingdom	For James Johnson.
Unknown date	Das	Full-rigged ship			Batavian Republic	For Batavian Navy.
Unknown date	Defence	Transport ship	Simon Temple	South Shields	United Kingdom	For Mr. Duncan.
Unknown date	De Gelder	Full-rigged ship			Batavian Republic	For Batavian Navy.
Unknown date	De Haan	Full-rigged ship			Batavian Republic	For Batavian Navy.
Unknown date	De Haas	Full-rigged ship			Batavian Republic	For Batavian Navy.
Unknown date	De Liefde	Full-rigged ship			Batavian Republic	For Batavian Navy.
Unknown date	Déterminé	Brig			France	For private owner.
Unknown date	Eliza	Merchantman	John Brockbank	Lancaster	United Kingdom	For private owner.
Unknown date	Estombole	Full-rigged ship		Bombay	India	For private owner.
Unknown date	Evertsen	Full-rigged ship			Batavian Republic	For Batavian Navy.
Unknown date	Fame	Merchantman	Matthew Smith	Calcutta	India	For private owner.
Unknown date	Fame	Sloop	Nicholas Bools & William Good	Bridport	United Kingdom	For Mr. Bell.
Unknown date	Forth	Snow	Nicholas Bools & William Good	Bridport	United Kingdom	For Leith Shipping Co.
Unknown date	Frisk	Cutter	Bools & Good	Bridport	United Kingdom	For private owner.
Unknown date	Governor King	Schooner	Henry Kable & James Underwood	Sydney	(United Kingdom of Great Britain and Ireland) New South Wales	For Henry Kable & James Underwood.
Unknown date	Harriot	Merchantman		Broadstairs	United Kingdom	For private owner.
Unknown date	Heemskerck	Full-rigged ship			Batavian Republic	For Batavian Navy.
Unknown date	Holland	Merchantman	John Brockbank	Lancaster	United Kingdom	For private owner.
Unknown date	Hulst	Full-rigged ship			Batavian Republic	For Batavian Navy.
Unknown date	Intrepid	Merchantman	Simon Temple Jr.	South Shields	United Kingdom	For Simon Temple Jr.
Unknown date	Jason	Ship-sloop	William Rowe	Newcastle upon Tyne	United Kingdom	For W. Row.
Unknown date	Kemphaan	Full-rigged ship			Batavian Republic	For Batavian Navy.
Unknown date	Lady Nepean	Cutter	Nicholas Bools & William Good	Bridport	United Kingdom	For Gibbs & Co.
Unknown date	Le Courrier de Terre Neuve	Privateer	Jean-Baptiste Collet	Saint-Servan	France	For private owner.
Unknown date	Lord Castlereagh	Merchantman	P. Tonks	Cochin	India	For Bruce, Fawcett & Co.
Unknown date	Macclesfield	Slave ship		Lancaster	United Kingdom	For Mr. Taylor.
Unknown date	Mansfield	Smack or sloop	Nicholas Bools & William Good	Bridport	United Kingdom	For Mr. Richardson.
Unknown date	Mansuriye	Third rate			Ottoman Empire	For Ottoman Navy.
Unknown date	Nancy	Sloop	Kable & Co	Hawkesbury River	(United Kingdom of Great Britain and Ireland) New South Wales	For private owner.
Unknown date	Nepean	Cutter	Nicholas Bools & William Good	Bridport	United Kingdom	For George Browne.
Unknown date	Œconomy	Merchantman	builder	Sunderland	United Kingdom	For private owner.
Unknown date	Otter	Merchantman	John Brockbank	Lancaster	United Kingdom	For private owner.
Unknown date	Oxford	Collier		Howdon Pans	United Kingdom	For private owner.
Unknown date	Pack-Horse	Luggage boat		Bombay	India	For British East India Company.
Unknown date	Paragon	Merchantman		Portsmouth, New Hampshire	United States	For private owner.
Unknown date	Patent	Merchantman		King's Lynn	United Kingdom	For Mr. Gillespie.
Unknown date	Pieter Floriszoon	Full-rigged ship		Dunkirk	France	For Batavian Navy.
Unknown date	Reynst	Full-rigged ship			Batavian Republic	For Batavian Navy.
Unknown date	Roemer Vlack	Full-rigged ship			Batavian Republic	For Batavian Navy.
Unknown date	Rosina	Merchantman		Hull	United Kingdom	For private owner.
Unknown date	Royal George	Brig-sloop		Cowes	United Kingdom	For Board of Customs.
Unknown date	Saint Pierre	Slave ship		Bordeaux	France	For private owner.
Unknown date	Sarah	Merchantman		Liverpool	United Kingdom	For R. Kitchen.
Unknown date	Schram	Full-rigged ship			Batavian Republic	For Batavian Navy.
Unknown date	Schrijver	Full-rigged ship			Batavian Republic	For Batavian Navy.
Unknown date	Sir William Burroughs	Merchantman		Calcutta	India	For private owner.
Unknown date	Staghouwer	Full-rigged ship			Batavian Republic	For Batavian Navy.
Unknown date	Tevfiknüma	Second rate		Rhodes	(Ottoman Empire) Ottoman Greece	For Ottoman Navy.
Unknown date	Thames	Collier		River Thames	United Kingdom	For private owner.
Unknown date	Thames	Schooner	Nicholas Bools & William Good	Bridport	United Kingdom	For Liddle & Co.
Unknown date	Thomas	Schooner		Sunderland	United Kingdom	For private owner.
Unknown date	Thomas & Anne	Merchantman	John & Philip Laing	Sunderland	United Kingdom	For Mr. Matthews.
Unknown date	Tjerk Hiddes de Vries	Full-rigged ship			Batavian Republic	For Batavian Navy.
Unknown date	Trial	Coaster		Belfast	United Kingdom	For private owner.
Unknown date	Triton	Full-rigged ship			Batavian Republic	For Batavian Navy.
Unknown date	Tromp	Full-rigged ship			Batavian Republic	For Batavian Navy.
Unknown date	Two Uncles	Schooner	Robert Newman	Dartmouth	United Kingdom	For private owner.
Unknown date	Tyne Packet	Schooner	Alexander Doeg	Gateshead	United Kingdom	For private owner.
Unknown date	Ulysses	Merchantman	John & Philip Laing	Sunderland	United Kingdom	For John & Philip Laing.
Unknown date	Van Der Does	Full-rigged ship			Batavian Republic	For Batavian Navy.
Unknown date	Van Gendt	Full-rigged ship			Batavian Republic	For Batavian Navy.
Unknown date	Van Nes	Full-rigged ship			Batavian Republic	For Batavian Navy.
Unknown date	Vlug	Full-rigged ship			Batavian Republic	For Batavian Navy.
Unknown date	Volunteer	Merchantman		South Shields	United Kingdom	For private owner.
Unknown date	Warmond	Full-rigged ship			Batavian Republic	For Batavian Navy.
Unknown date	Wassenaar	Full-rigged ship			Batavian Republic	For Batavian Navy.
Unknown date	William Pitt	West Indiaman		Liverpool	United Kingdom	For James Loughan.
Unknown date	Witte Cornelisz	Full-rigged ship			Batavian Republic	For Batavian Navy.
Unknown date	Name unknown	Schooner			France	For private owner.
Unknown date	Name unknown	Merchantman			United States	For private owner.
Unknown date	Name unknown	Merchantman		Cowes	United Kingdom	For private owner.
Unknown date	Name unknown	Merchantman			Spain	For private owner.
Unknown date	Name unknown	Merchantman		Rotterdam	Batavian Republic	For private owner.
Unknown date	Name unknown	Merchantman			Spain	For private owner.
Unknown date	Name unknown	Merchantman		Hull	United Kingdom	For private owner.
