= List of ship launches in 1841 =

The list of ship launches in 1841 includes a chronological list of some ships launched in 1841.

| Date | Ship | Class | Builder | Location | Country | Notes |
|---|---|---|---|---|---|---|
| 7 January | Missouri | Paddle frigate | Samuel Hartt | New York Navy Yard | United States | For United States Navy. |
| 8 January | Palatine | Full-rigged ship | Messrs J. & W. Campion | Whitby | United Kingdom | For private owners. |
| 18 January | Rapid | Schooner | Speakman | Preston | United Kingdom | For Messrs. Humber. |
| 19 January | Miss Chiff | Schooner | Francis Williams | Canons Marsh | United Kingdom | For private owner. |
| 23 January | Constantia | Brig | Messrs. Parkinson & Brown | Hull | United Kingdom | For private owner. |
| 23 January | Tasmania | Barque | James Stothard & Co | Monkwearmouth | United Kingdom | For F. Heisch & Co. |
| 26 January | Lucy | Brig | John & Charles Alcock | Sunderland | United Kingdom | For Matthew Aisbitt. |
| 26 January | Styx | Driver-class sloop | | Sheerness Dockyard | United Kingdom | For Royal Navy. |
| January | Asiatic | Barque | Reed, Denton & Co. | Sunderland | United Kingdom | For Munro & Co. |
| January | Barbara | Merchantman | W. Robinson | Sunderland | United Kingdom | For M. Robson. |
| 2 February | John | Merchantman | Womack | Agbrigg | United Kingdom | For Messrs. Ibbotson & Lister. |
| 4 February | Vixen | Driver-class sloop | | Pembroke Dockyard | United Kingdom | For Royal Navy. |
| 6 February | Sémillante | Surveillante-class frigate | | Lorient | France | For French Navy. |
| 9 February | Sultan | East Indiaman | Humphrey | Hull | United Kingdom | For Messrs John Beadle & Co. |
| 12 February | Ardent | Alecto-class sloop | | Chatham Dockyard | United Kingdom | For Royal Navy. |
| 12 February | Lord Fitzgerald and Vesei | Schooner | | Galway | United Kingdom | For private owner. |
| 13 February | Economy | Schooner | Henry Jones | Port Madoc | United Kingdom | For private owner. |
| 16 February | William Cannyngs | Brig | Thomas Evans | Bideford | United Kingdom | For Messrs. Lucas, Goyer, and Lucas. |
| 22 February | Gertrude | Barque | W. Thompson & Pearson | Sunderland | United Kingdom | For Mr. Gibson. |
| 24 February | Gartsherrie | Barque | Duncanson | Alloa | United Kingdom | For private owner. |
| 25 February | Clyde | Steamship | Messrs. Robert Duncan & Co. | Glasgow | United Kingdom | For Royal West India Steam Packet Company. |
| February | Bride of Abydos | Merchantman | Peter Austin & Son | Sunderland | United Kingdom | For Crozier & Co. |
| February | Elizabeth | Merchantman | T. Elliot | Sunderland | United Kingdom | For P. Watson. |
| February | Ewart | Schooner | Bell & Cairncross | Sunderland | United Kingdom | For J. Ewart. |
| February | Friends | Merchantman | | Sunderland | United Kingdom | For Mr. Brown. |
| February | Grindlay | Barque | | Sunderland | United Kingdom | For Walter Grindlay. |
| February | Louis XIV | Merchantman | | Bordeaux | France | For private owner. |
| February | Palestine | Merchantman | J. H. Robson | Sunderland | United Kingdom | For Mr. Penman. |
| 6 March | The Saucy Jack | Schooner | James Chapman | Southtown | United Kingdom | For Messrs. W. H. Draper & Co. |
| 8 March | Andromaque | Surveillante-class frigate | | Lorient | France | For French Navy. |
| 8 March | Duff | Brig | John Byerley & Sons | Portsea | United Kingdom | For John Byerley & Sons. |
| 8 March | Shamrock | Steamship | Messrs Bush and Beddoe | Bristol | United Kingdom | For private owner. |
| 9 March | The Bentley | Brig | Messrs Humphrey & Co. | Hull | United Kingdom | For Norrison Levett. |
| 10 March | Herculaneum | Barque | Edward Gibson | Hull | United Kingdom | For Messrs. Taylor, Potter & Co. |
| 23 March | Seagull | Barque | Rubie | Southampton | United Kingdom | For private owner. |
| 24 March | Spy | Brigantine | | Sheerness Dockyard | United Kingdom | For Royal Navy. |
| 30 March | Pickering | Schooner | Messrs. Barricks | Whitby | United Kingdom | For Whitby, Pickering and London Shipping Company. |
| March | Ann Eliza | Schooner | James Barkes | Sunderland | United Kingdom | For J. Hay. |
| March | Harriet | Merchantman | James Stothard | Sunderland | United Kingdom | For James Stothard. |
| March | Sarah Crisp | Barque | | Sunderland | United Kingdom | For T. Crisp. |
| 2 April | John Brook | Schooner | John Brook | Bideford | United Kingdom | For private owner. |
| 6 April | Geyser | Driver-class sloop | | Pembroke Dockyard | United Kingdom | For Royal Navy. |
| 12 April | Princess Royal | Paddle steamer | Messrs. Wigram & Green | Blackwall | United Kingdom | For General Steam Navigation Company. |
| 12 April | Queen Victoria | Steamship | Green | Blackwall | United Kingdom | For General Steam Navigation Company. |
| 13 April | Princess Royal | full-rigged ship | | Carmarthen | United Kingdom | For private owner. |
| 19 April | Ohio | Merchantman | Austin & Mills | Southwick | United Kingdom | For General Shipping Company. |
| 22 April | Anna Mary | Brig | Fraserburgh Shipbuilding Company | Fraserburgh | United Kingdom | For private owner. |
| 23 April | Benjamin Williams | Merchantman | Edward Ellis | Garth | United Kingdom | For private owner. |
| 23 April | Jessie Anderson | Barque | Innes | Leith | United Kingdom | For Messrs. Anderson, Wigham Munro & Co. |
| 23 April | Siren | Helena-class brig-sloop | | Woolwich Dockyard | United Kingdom | For Royal Navy. |
| 23 April | Tenasserim | Steamship | British East India Company | Moulmein | Burma | For British East India Company. |
| 24 April | Doctor | Schooner | William Bayley | Ipswich | United Kingdom | For Mr. Stone. |
| 26 April | The William Hogarth | Schooner | Bowman, Verdon & Co. | Aberdeen | United Kingdom | For private owner. |
| April | Advance | Snow | B. Stafford | Sunderland | United Kingdom | For J. Parkin. |
| April | Messenger | Schooner | J. Evans | Aberystwyth | United Kingdom | For private owner. |
| April | Mornington | Merchantman | W. Sutherland | Sunderland | United Kingdom | For J. R. Tuer. |
| April | Ocean Queen | Schooner | J. Evans | Aberystwyth | United Kingdom | For private owner. |
| 1 May | Tweed | Steamship | Messrs. Thompson & Spiers | Greenock | United Kingdom | For Royal West India Steam Packet Company. |
| 3 May | Brilliant | Schooner | Henry Teall | Leeds | United Kingdom | For private owner. |
| 5 May | Mississippi | Paddle frigate | | Philadelphia Navy Yard | United States | For United States Navy. |
| 6 May | Panope | Schooner | Messrs. P. Chaloner, Sons & Co. | Liverpool | United Kingdom | For Liverpool and London Shipping Company. |
| 12 May | Highlander | Brigantine | David King | Ipswich | United Kingdom | For Messrs. J. G. Plummer and John Nolloth. |
| 18 May | Southampton | East Indiaman | Messrs. Wigram | Blackwall | United Kingdom | For British East India Company. |
| 20 May | Nidaros | Corvette | | | Norway | For Royal Norwegian Navy. |
| 22 May | Agincourt | Merchantman | Messrs. Green & Wigram | Blackwall | United Kingdom | For R. Green. |
| 22 May | Forth | Steamship | Messrs. Robert Menzies & Sons | Leith | United Kingdom | For West India Royal Mail Steam Packet Company. |
| 22 May | Grimaldi | Schooner | Messrs. Bannister & Co. | Liverpool | United Kingdom | For W. S. Dixon & Co. |
| 22 May | The Cambrian Maid | Schooner | Ellis Evans | Penmaenpool | United Kingdom | For private owner. |
| 23 May | Sampson | Brigantine | John Dawson & Co. | Liverpool | United Kingdom | For G. H. Thompson. |
| 25 May | Solway | Steamship | James McMillan | Crawfordyke | United Kingdom | For Royal Mail Steam Packet Company. |
| 29 May | Timbuctoo | Merchantman | Messrs. Hillhouse's | Bristol | United Kingdom | For Messrs. R. & W. King. |
| May | Alexander | Snow | E. T. Thompson & J Teasdale | Sunderland | United Kingdom | For A. Scott. |
| May | George Vickery | Brig | William Tardrew | Bideford | United Kingdom | For private owner. |
| May | Majestic | Barque | George Frater | Sunderland | United Kingdom | For J. & J. Wait. |
| 19 June | Victoria of Dundalk | Dredger | Messrs. J. B. Maxton & Co. | Leith | United Kingdom | For Dundalk Harbour Commissioners. |
| 21 June | Doris | Schooner | Messrs. Sothern & Day | Runcorn | United Kingdom | For private owner. |
| 21 June | Trafalgar | Caledonia-class ship of the line | | Woolwich Dockyard | United Kingdom | For Royal Navy. |
| June | Jupiter | Merchantman | Brownlow, Pearson & Co. | Hull | United Kingdom | For private owner. |
| June | Mary Ann | Brig | | Bay of Fundy | (United Kingdom of Great Britain and Ireland) Colony of New Brunswick or Colony of Nova Scotia | For private owner. |
| June | Tynemouth Castle | Snow | J. M. Gales | Hylton Ferry | United Kingdom | For Mr. Coppock. |
| 3 July | Devastation | Driver-class sloop | | Woolwich Dockyard | United Kingdom | For Royal Navy. |
| 5 July | Cambrian | Frigate | Alexander Christie | Pembroke Dock | United Kingdom | For Royal Navy. |
| 5 July | John and William | Merchantman | Chambers | Rotherham | United Kingdom | For Messrs. Henry and Edward Canham. |
| 6 July | Medina | Paddle steamer | Messrs. Thomas and John White | Cowes | United Kingdom | For Mail Steam Packet Company. |
| 6 July | The Queen | Schooner | | Bridlington | United Kingdom | For private owner. |
| 10 July | Hendrick Hudson | Packet ship | | New York | United States | For private owner. |
| 13 July | Medway | Steamship | Pritchard | Northfleet | United Kingdom | For East India Steam Packet Company. |
| 15 July | Dvienadsat Apostolov | Dvienadsat Apostolov-class ship of the line | S. I. Chernyavskiy | Nicholaieff | Russia | For Imperial Russian Navy. |
| 19 July | Gomer | Gomer-class frigate | | Rochefort | France | For French Navy. |
| 19 July | Llewellyn | East Indiaman | Tucker | Teignmouth | United Kingdom | For private owner. |
| 20 July | Earl of Stradbroke | Schooner | Messrs. Hunt & Son | Ipswich | United Kingdom | For private owner. |
| 20 July | Good Intent | Schooner | Messrs. Humphrey & Co. | Hull | United Kingdom | For J. R. Thompson. |
| 20 July | Growler | Driver-class sloop | | Chatham Dockyard | United Kingdom | For Royal Navy. |
| 21 July | Glengariff | Brig | Westcott | Bideford | United Kingdom | For private owner. |
| 21 July | The Gleaner | Schooner | | Preston | United Kingdom | For Messrs. J. & A. Caunce. |
| 23 July | Coverdale | Barque | | Salisbury | (United Kingdom of Great Britain and Ireland) Colony of New Brunswick | For private owner. |
| July | T. H. Havelock | Brig | | | (United Kingdom of Great Britain and Ireland) Colony of Prince Edward Island | For private owner. |
| July | Tom Moore | Full-rigged ship | | Quebec | (United Kingdom of Great Britain and Ireland) Province of Canada | For private owner. |
| 2 August | Hindostan | Second rate | | Plymouth Dockyard | United Kingdom | For Royal Navy. |
| 5 August | Diligent | Sloop | W. Coulson | Wincolmlee | United Kingdom | For Messrs. John Payne & Co. |
| 5 August | Romp | Brig | Messrs. Parkinson & Brown | Hull | United Kingdom | For Robert Bilton. |
| 11 August | Argaum | Full-rigged ship | Messrs. William Simons & Co. | Liverpool | United Kingdom | For Messrs. Ross, Corbett & Co. |
| 16 August | Congress | Frigate | | Portsmouth Navy Yard | United States | For United States Navy. |
| 16 August | Heroine | Brig | | Woolwich Dockyard | United Kingdom | For Royal Navy. |
| 16 August | Spartan | Spartan-class frigate | | Plymouth Dockyard | United Kingdom | For Royal Navy. |
| 16 August | Victory | Humber Keel | | | United Kingdom | For private owner. |
| 17 August | Collingwood | Vanguard-class ship of the line | | Pembroke Dockyard | United Kingdom | For Royal Navy. |
| 17 August | Messager | Gazelle-class brig | | Rochefort | France | For French Navy. |
| 17 August | Splendid | Merchantman | Garland | Newburgh | United Kingdom | For private owner. |
| 18 August | Mary Thompson | Merchantman | H. Smith & Son. | Gainsborough | United Kingdom | For private owner. |
| 18 August | Peruvian | Barque | Alexander | Govan | United Kingdom | For Messrs. Urie & Co. |
| 20 August | Jean Baxter | Schooner | Adamson | Broughty Ferry | United Kingdom | For private owner. |
| 21 August | Splendid | Merchantman | | Newburgh | United Kingdom | For private owner. |
| August | Amelia Mary | Snow | Joseph Doxford | Sunderland | United Kingdom | For Mr. Culliford. |
| August | Bowes of Streatlam | Barque | W. S. Mellanby | Stockton-on-Tees | United Kingdom | For Henry French. |
| August | Orestes | Schooner | | | (United Kingdom of Great Britain and Ireland) Colony of Prince Edward Island | For private owner. |
| August | Pattison | Merchantman | Stephenson & Stuart | Sunderland | United Kingdom | For Mr. Stephenson. |
| August | Shepherdess | Merchantman | J. Ratcliffe | Sunderland | United Kingdom | For Todd & Co. |
| 2 September | Papillon | Gazelle-class brig | | Rochefort, Charente-Maritime | France | For French Navy. |
| 2 September | The Emerald Isle | Schooner | Messrs. Sparrow | Wexford | United Kingdom | For Richard Walsh. |
| 2 September | Vasco da Gama | Ship of the line | | Lisbon | Portugal | For Portuguese Navy. |
| 4 September | The Maiden City | Paddle steamer | Coppin | Londonderry | United Kingdom | For Steam Packet Company. |
| 7 September | Oriental | Schooner | Frederick Prestom | Great Yarmouth | United Kingdom | For private owner. |
| 7 September | Trident | Paddle steamer | Messrs. Green, Wigrams, and Green | Blackwall | United Kingdom | For General Steam Navigation Company. |
| 13 September | Sydenham | Steamship | | Montreal | (United Kingdom of Great Britain and Ireland) Province of Canada | For Government of Province of Canada. |
| 14 September | John Wilson Patten | Brig | Bridge Foundry Co. | Warrington | United Kingdom | For private owner. |
| 16 September | Gregory XVI | Merchantman | | Ancona | Papal States | For private owner. |
| 17 September | Jupiter | Steamship | Messrs. Chaloner, Son & Co | Liverpool | United Kingdom | For private owner. |
| 30 September | Duncan | Barque | Messrs. Menzies | Leith | United Kingdom | For private owner. |
| September | Forte | Frigate | | Cherbourg | France | For French Navy. |
| 2 October | Little Western | Paddle steamer | Messrs. Acramans, Morgan & Co. | Bristol | United Kingdom | For Gravesend Railway Company. |
| 2 October | Proto | Schooner | John Laird | Birkenhead | United Kingdom | For Liverpool and London Shipping Company. |
| 2 October | Sarah | Fishing trawler | Owen | Teignmouth | United Kingdom | For private owner. |
| 11 October | Teviot | Paddle steamer | Messrs. Robert Duncan & Co | Greenock | United Kingdom | For Royal West India Steam Packet Company. |
| 15 October | Martha | Brig | Alexander McLaine | Belfat | United Kingdom | For private owner. |
| 20 October | Precursor | Paddle steam | Messrs. Hedderwick & Rancine | Kelvinhaugh | United Kingdom | For Oriental Steam Navigation Company. |
| 30 October | Dowlah | Barque | Hobkirk | Whitby | United Kingdom | For private owner. |
| 30 October | Rory O'More | Merchantman | Messrs. Jenkinson & McEwen | Kirkcudbright | United Kingdom | For Messrs. Moore, Christian & Co. |
| October | Agnes Blaikie | Barque | Walter Hood | Aberdeen | United Kingdom | For George Thompson Jr. |
| October | Empress | Merchantman | Wilson, Spence & Todd | Sunderland | United Kingdom | For Cragg & Co. |
| October | Portly | Barque | Thompson & Pearson | Sunderland | United Kingdom | For Mr. Reed. |
| 24 November | Doggerbank | Frigate | | Amsterdam | Netherlands | For Royal Netherlands Navy. |
| 30 November | Henry Winch | Brig | William Jones | Pwllheli | United Kingdom | For Peek Brothers & Winch. |
| November | Aden | Barque | J. J. Rodham & Todd | Sunderland | United Kingdom | For R. Brooks. |
| 1 December | Equestrian | Merchantman | Messrs. Humphrey & Co | Hull | United Kingdom | For private owner. |
| 29 December | Arch Duke Frederick | Steamship | | Bedminster | United Kingdom | For Austrian Government. |
| Unknown date | Alice | Sloop | | | United Kingdom | For private owner. |
| Unknown date | Amelia | Fishing trawler | Frederick Baddeley | Brixham | United Kingdom | For Frederick Hoare and John Laing. |
| Unknown date | Argo | Full-rigged ship | Webb & Allen | New York | United States | For William Whitlock Jr. |
| Unknown date | Bebside | Schooner | Bowman and Drummond | Blyth | United Kingdom | For Mr. Coppin. |
| Unknown date | Belle Creole | Merchantman | Peter Austin | Sunderland | United Kingdom | For Palmer & Co. |
| Unknown date | Bosphorus | Barque | H. Carr | Sunderland | United Kingdom | For A. Parker & Co. |
| Unknown date | Brunette | Barque | T. Gales | Sunderland | United Kingdom | For Gales & Co. |
| Unknown date | Catharine | Schooner | | Sunderland | United Kingdom | For private owner. |
| Unknown date | Chance | Schooner | Bartram & Lister | Sunderland | United Kingdom | For R. Hutchinson & Thompson. |
| Unknown date | Charlotte | Snow | Benjamin Hodgson & Co. | Sunderland | United Kingdom | For A. Grey. |
| Unknown date | Cornelius | Brig | | Sunderland | United Kingdom | For Mr. Thompson. |
| Unknown date | Croxdale | Merchantman | Hull & Sikes | Sunderland | United Kingdom | For H. Dixon. |
| Unknown date | Dahlia | Schooner | H. Dobbinson | Sunderland | United Kingdom | For private owner. |
| Unknown date | Dolores | Schooner | William Bonker | Salcombe | United Kingdom | For Robert Hurrell and others. |
| Unknown date | Emily | Barque | | Sunderland | United Kingdom | For Dall & Co. |
| Unknown date | Era | Paddle steamer | Mr. Spiller | Battersea | United Kingdom | For private owner. |
| Unknown date | Fifeshire | Merchantman | Laing & Simey | Sunderland | United Kingdom | For Pirie & Co. |
| Unknown date | Foam | Chinaman | | | United Kingdom | For private owner. |
| Unknown date | Gateshead Park | Barque | W. Doxford | Southwick | United Kingdom | For Abbott & Co. |
| Unknown date | Gazelle | Snow | Byers | Sunderland | United Kingdom | For Mr. Robinson. |
| Unknown date | Good Intent | Sloop | Edward T. Thompson & John Teasdale | Monkwearmouth | United Kingdom | For private owner. |
| Unknown date | Good Intent | Schooner | | Sunderland | United Kingdom | For R. Glaves. |
| Unknown date | Hamsterly Hall | Merchantman | G. Thompson | Sunderland | United Kingdom | For Mr. Thompson. |
| Unknown date | Hants | Merchantman | Bartram & Lister | Sunderland | United Kingdom | For Mr. Burrell. |
| Unknown date | Helena | Packet ship | William H. Webb | New York | United States | For N. L. and G. Griswold. |
| Unknown date | Integrity | Snow | Joseph Helmsley | Sunderland | United Kingdom | For Mr. Helmsley. |
| Unknown date | Isabella Wood | Snow | T. Ogden | Sunderland | United Kingdom | For Hartlepool United Shipping Company. |
| Unknown date | Jane Frances | Barque | | Sunderland | United Kingdom | For Mr. Fenwick. |
| Unknown date | Jarramas | Man of war | | | Sweden | For Royal Swedish Navy. |
| Unknown date | John Wickliffe | Full-rigged ship | | | United Kingdom | For private owner. |
| Unknown date | Juliet | Schooner | W. Chilton | Sunderland | United Kingdom | For Ord & Co. |
| Unknown date | Lady Gray | Snow | W. Naisby | Sunderland | United Kingdom | For Mr. Wingrave. |
| Unknown date | Lady Margaret | Snow | R. Kater | Sunderland | United Kingdom | For R. Naters. |
| Unknown date | Lady Mary | Merchantman | | Sunderland | United Kingdom | For Mr. Greenwell. |
| Unknown date | Margaret | Schooner | Kirkbride & partners | Sunderland | United Kingdom | For Blair & Co. |
| Unknown date | Marsden | Brig | Hull & Sykes | Hylton | United Kingdom | For T. Gibson. |
| Unknown date | Memnon | Paddle frigate | Fletcher, Son & Fearnall | Limehouse | United Kingdom | For Indian Navy. |
| Unknown date | Nestor | Snow | W. Sutherland | Sunderland | United Kingdom | For R. Metcalf. |
| Unknown date | New Zealand | Barque | Laing & Simey | Sunderland | United Kingdom | For P. Laing & Co. |
| Unknown date | Nordstjernen | Corvette | | | Norway | For Royal Norwegian Navy. |
| Unknown date | Oneida | Full-rigged ship | Jacob Westerveldt | New York | United States | For John J. Boyd and Edward Hincken. |
| Unknown date | Orator | Barque | Noble | Sunderland | United Kingdom | For J. Hay. |
| Unknown date | Orderly | Fishing trawler | Frederick Baddeley | Brixham | United Kingdom | For Samuel S. Drew & Samuel Vittery. |
| Unknown date | Orion | Steam yacht | Messrs. John Scott & Sons | Greenock | United Kingdom | For Royal Northern Yacht Club. |
| Unknown date | Palestine | Full-rigged ship | | Quebec | (United Kingdom of Great Britain and Ireland) Province of Canada | For Messrs. Astley Brothers. |
| Unknown date | Patna | Barque | Daniel Brocklebank | Whitehaven | United Kingdom | For private owner. |
| Unknown date | Phoenix | Schooner | | Baltimore, Maryland | United States | For United States Navy. |
| Unknown date | Pijl | Full-rigged ship | | Dunkerque | France | For Royal Netherlands Navy. |
| Unknown date | Pilot | Snow | Greenwell & Sacker | Monkwearmouth | United Kingdom | For James Parkin. |
| Unknown date | Princess Royal | Schooner | John Anderton | Runcorn | United Kingdom | For John Crippin. |
| Unknown date | Priscilla | Barque | Peter Austin | Sunderland | United Kingdom | For John Campbell. |
| Unknown date | Risk | Snow | John M. Gales | Sunderland | United Kingdom | For private owner. |
| Unknown date | Rosebud | Schooner | Henry Barrick | Whitby | United Kingdom | For private owner. |
| Unknown date | Templar | Snow | | Sunderland | United Kingdom | For Wilson & Co. |
| Unknown date | Thomas Arbuthnot | Merchantman | | | Unknown | For private owner. |
| Unknown date | Thor | Man of war | | | Sweden | For Royal Swedish Navy. |
| Unknown date | Touch Me Not | Schooner | William Brokenshaw | Fowey | United Kingdom | For private owner. |
| Unknown date | Trent | Paddle steamer | William Pitcher | Northfleet | United Kingdom | For Royal Mail Steam Packet Company. |
| Unknown date | Troubador | Steamship | Messrs. Thomas Vernon & Co. | Liverpool | United Kingdom | For private owner. |
| Unknown date | Two Sisters | Snow | H. Carr | Hylton Ferry | United Kingdom | For Mr. Davison. |
| Unknown date | Tyne | Merchantman | | Sunderland | United Kingdom | For Bilton & Co. |
| Unknown date | Van Buren | Full-rigged ship | | | United States | For United States Navy. |
| Unknown date | Vicar of Bray | Merchantman | | Sunderland | United Kingdom | For private owner. |
| Unknown date | Vicar of Bray | Barque | T. & J. Brocklebank | Whitehaven | United Kingdom | For private owner. |
| Unknown date | William and Mary | Merchantman | | Sunderland | United Kingdom | For Mr. Granger. |
| Unknown date | William J. Romer | Pilot boat | John & James Friend | New York | United States | For James J. Wilkie, James Conner, Robert W. Johnson, and George H. Sisco. |
| Unknown date | Zephyr | Full-rigged ship | | Rotterdam | Netherlands | For Royal Netherlands Navy. |
| Unknown date | No. 2 | Chain ferry | Acramans, Morgan & Co. | Bristol | United Kingdom | For Port of Portsmouth Floating Bridge Co. |
