= British Tar (ship) =

Several ships have been named British Tar an alternative nickname for British sailors to Jack Tar:

- British Tar (1792 ship) was launched at Shields and made five voyages as a whaler and several as a West Indiaman. She then became a general trader. She was lost on 29 January 1818.
- British Tar (1797 ship) was built in Plymouth (probably Plymouth, Massachusetts). She sailed from Bristol in 1805 on a slave trading voyage during which the French captured her. She became the privateer Revanche, out of Guadeloupe. Revanche fought an inconclusive single-ship action in 1806 with HMS Curieux. The British captured Revanche in 1808.
- British Tar (1803 ship) was built by Lockwood Brodrick (Late), at South Shields. She was last listed in 1811.
- British Tar (1804 ship) was launched in 1793 in Spain under another name and taken in prize. In 1806 she was on a voyage from Labrador to the Mediterranean when a French squadron captured and burnt her.
- British Tar (1814 ship) was launched at Whitby in 1814. She became a Liverpool-based merchantman, trading across the Atlantic with North America until she was wrecked in August 1840.
- British Tar (1824 ship), of 383–395 tons (bm), was a brig launched at Sunderland. In 1834 she made a voyage carrying immigrants to Canada under the Petworth Emigration Scheme. She was last listed in 1863.
