= Tyne (ship) =

Some 20 vessels have been built on the River Tyne and have been named Tyne for it. In addition, some vessels built elsewhere have also been named Tyne.

== Tyne (1798 ship) ==
Tyne was launched in Newcastle-on-Tyne. She sailed between Dublin and the United States and apparently was captured c. 1801.

== Tyne Packet (1803 ship) ==
Tyne Packet was launched in Newcastle-on-Tyne. She spent much of her brief career sailing between London and Dublin. Her crew had to abandon her on 26 September 1811 as she had taken on a lot of water and was in danger of sinking.

== Tyne (1807 ship) ==
Tyne was launched in 1807 in Rotherhithe. She spent the first part of her career as a West Indiaman. However, in 1810–1811 she made a voyage to India for the British East India Company (EIC) as an "extra" ship, i.e., under charter. Then in 1818 she made a voyage to Port Jackson, New South Wales transporting convicts. Thereafter, with a change of owners, she traded with the Far East under a license issued by the EIC. A fire destroyed her in 1828.

== Tyne (1841 ship) ==
Tyne was built in Sunderland. She made three voyages to New Zealand, carrying immigrants on behalf of the New Zealand Company. She was wrecked in July 1845.

== See also ==
- HMS Tyne, any one of six vessels of the British Royal Navy by that name
