= SV Argo (1841) =

American wooden sailing vessel

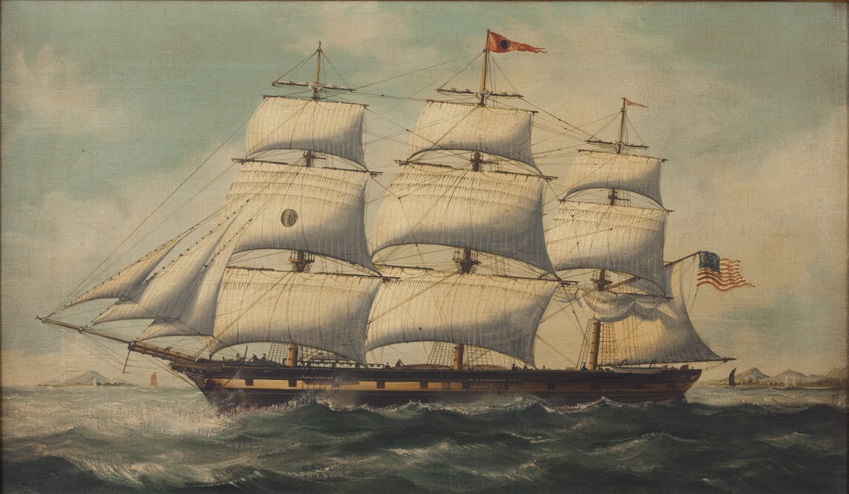
- American packet ship Montezuma; Built 1843, Webb & Allen; Very similar dimensions to the Argo

History

United States
- Name: SV Argo
- Owner: William Whitlock, Jr (1841 – 1851); Samuel Thompson (1851 – 1854)
- Builder: Webb & Allen
- Laid down: 1840
- Launched: 1841
- Out of service: 1854
- Fate: Abandoned at sea

General characteristics
- Class & type: Full-rigged
- Tons burthen: 967 (registered)
- Length: 161 ft
- Beam: 36.3 ft
- Draught: 20.5 ft
- Propulsion: Full sail
- Sail plan: Square rigged
- Complement: Permanent crew approx. 15; Voyage crew up to approx. 415
- Notes: Square-riggers on schedule by Robert Greenhalgh Albion, 1938, Princeton University Press, p. 286

The SV Argo was an American wooden sailing vessel (SV) designed for the trans-Atlantic Packet trade. William Whitlock, Jr acquired the ship for his Havre-Whitlock Line, which regularly scheduled round trips three times a year from New York City to Le Havre, France.

== Captains ==
Caleb Anthony, Jr 1841–1847

Isaac H. Davis 1848–1849

Daniel H Wood 1849

Samuel Macoduck 1851–1854

Charles D Crawford 1850

== Argo passenger arrivals into the Port of New York ==
Compiled from ship arrivals from Le Havre, France from 1841 to 1849, Ancestry.com, NARA and castlegarden.org. Arrival in the Port of New York was on pier 14 noted as the Havre-Union Line (trans-Atlantic packet). Departure dates compiled from The New York Herald.

Departure Date (Le Havre)	Arrival Date (New York)	Days Sailing	Captain	No.
April 21, 1841	May 24, 1841	33	Anthony	316
August 31, 1841	October 11, 1841	41	Anthony	141
December 30, 1841	February 14, 1842	46	Anthony	21
April 24, 1842	May 25, 1842	31	Anthony	390
August 25, 1842	September 26, 1842	32	Anthony	90
January 1, 1843	February 13, 1843	43	Anthony	18
June 24, 1843	July 26, 1843	32	Anthony	390
September 24, 1843	October 21, 1843	27	Anthony	66
February 5, 1844	March 11, 1844	35	Anthony	16
May 25, 1844	July 1, 1844	37	Anthony	387
September 25, 1844	October 24, 1844	29	Anthony	80
February 2, 1845	March 13, 1845	39	Anthony	14
May 28, 1845	July 2, 1845	35	Anthony	291
October 1, 1845	November 8, 1845	38	Anthony	219
February 4, 1846	March 13, 1846	37	Anthony	42
May 25, 1846	June 29, 1846	35	Anthony	382
September 30, 1846	November 6, 1846	37	Anthony	385
January 31, 1847	March 30, 1847	58	Anthony	79
May 26, 1847	June 24, 1847	29	Anthony	314
September 26, 1847	October 22, 1847	26	Anthony	319
January 27, 1848	March 10, 1848	43	Davis	86
May 25, 1848	June 29, 1848	35	Davis	338
October 1, 1848	November 1, 1848	31	Davis	183
January 31, 1849	March 6, 1849	34	Davis	91
May 1849	June 30, 1849		Davis	337
October 2, 1849	November 6, 1849	35	Wood	286
January 30, 1850	March 12, 1850		Crawford	See below

== The wreck of the Argo ==
The "Argo" ran aground on a sand bar on the south shore of Long Island near present-day Mastic Beach and remained there for over a year before it was removed, repaired and sold to another owner. As was common, major local newspapers avoided mention of wrecks, especially without loss of life, as not to supply negative publicity for their advertisers (owners and operators). The 1850 grounding of the Argo occurred at approximately 40°43′30″N 72°53′21″W, about 1.5 miles west of the contemporary memorial for TWA Flight 800.

- "THE SHIP ARGO — This vessel, which went ashore off Fire-place, on Fire Island, on Friday night last, is now lying broadside to the shore. At high tide, yesterday, the sea broke completely over her the wind being from the northeast, but at low tide she can be approached dry shod. She was laden with about 1800 packages, about 800 of which have been discharged, 600 in a sound gate. The remaining portion of the cargo is all afloat, there being about ten feet of water in the lower hold. The planks are not started, and only a few seams near the stern are open. She is imbedded in the sand nearly to the top of her copper, but the underwriter's agent, Captain Waring, does not despair of getting her off. The cargo is now coming to the city in lighters. As the water shoals, on this shore, very gradually —at the rate, It is said, of not more than a fathom a mile—and as the wind was not high on Friday night, though the night was foggy, the occasion of the accident to the Argo is naturally a subject of much speculation."
- "SHIP ARGO ASHORE - The N.Y Com. Adv. of Saturday says - Ship Argo, Crawford, went on shore on Tuesday night (March 12, 1850) at half past seven o'clock, twenty-five miles to the eastward of Fire Island. The passengers were safely landed and the mate and part of the crew came to the city by the Long Island railroad last evening. The Argo sailed from Havre on the 30th of January. The amount of damage she had sustained is not yet known. The Argo was built in this city in 1841, was 967 burthen, and her estimated value prior to this accident was $60,000. She was insured in various offices in Wall Street. Her cargo must be very valuable, $200,000 to $300,000 most of which is insured, partly in France but chiefly in this city. Assistance has been sent to her." No further voyages under the ownership of William Whitlock, Jr to and from Havre and New York have been discovered after this incident.
- "We learn that the pkt ship Argo, ashore on Mystic (Mastic) Point, 20 miles E of Fire Island, will probably be got off after disg. She was perfectly sound when last heard from."
- "Col. E.L. Snow, inspector of the customs, New York, was thrown from his wagon, on his way to the wreck of the ship Argo, on Long Island, and severely injured. It is said he cannot with safety be removed at present."
- Margaret Fuller Ossoli wrote to Madame Arconati (April 21, 1850): " It was an odd combination. I had intended, if I went by way of France, to take the packet ship Argo from Havre; I had just written to Mrs. Story that I should not do so; and at the same time requested her to find Miss Fitton, who had my muff, etc.; having closed the letter, I took up 'Galignani', and my eye fell on these words, Died, 4th April, at No. 10 Rue Ville l'Eveque, Miss E. Fitton. Turning the leaf, I read of the wreck of the Argo returning from America to France (from France to America). There were also notices of the wreck of the Royal Adelaide, a fine English steamer, and of the John Skiddy, one of the fine American packets. Thus, as it seems, safety is not to be found in the wisest calculation. I shall embark more composedly in my merchant ship; praying, indeed, fervently, that it may not be my lot to lose my babe at sea, either by un-solaced sickness, or amid the howling waves. Or, that if I should, it may be brief anguish, and Ossoli, he and I go together. Pray with me, dear friend, as yours ever, forever, MARGARET."
- Margaret Fuller died about 90 days after writing to Madame Arconati in a shipwreck off Fire Island, near the wreck of the Argo.
- "Ship Argo from Havre for New York, which was stranded a long while ago, has finally been floated off and at last account is waiting a steamer to tow her up to New York. She has been saved through the perseverance of Captain William Boardman, Jim and John M Brown, who contracted with the underwriters of Wall street to save her."
- "The ship Argo lately brought to our port after having been buried for a twelvemonth in the sands below Fire Island has been put on the Sectional Floating Dry Dock for repair, all her timbers having been severely strained."

== Later ownership ==
Used on a Liverpool to New York route by the Caleb Grimshaw and Co in 1851 and on a Liverpool to Melbourne Australia route in departing in 1852. Samuel Thompson's Nephew and Co., acquired the Argo in 1851.

- "Packet ship Argo mentioned a few weeks ago in your columns is the same vessel, your correspondent refers to. This vessel was built at New York in 1841 for Fox & Livingston's (William Whitlock's) Havre Line. She went ashore on March 14, 1850, at Mystic Point, twenty miles east of Fire Island, and laid there for more than twelve months, brought to New York about March 26, 1851, repaired and sold to Thompson & Nephews Company, and run to Liverpool; afterward to the Pacific Ocean: vessel was lost on April 17, 1854, in a violent hurricane during a voyage from Baltimore to Liverpool, the pumps becoming choked, the case became hopeless and the vessel was abandoned. The crew was taken off by another vessel. She was nothing but an ordinary packet ship of that period. - J.B. Morrison"

== Argo passenger arrivals into the Port of New York (N.Y.) and Melbourne (Mel.) ==
Compiled from ship arrivals from 1850 to 1852, Ancestry.com and NARA.

Arrival Date	Captain	No.	Port
September 24, 1851	Samuel Macoduck	437	N.Y.
February 3, 1852	Samuel Macoduck	95	N.Y.
January 19, 1853	Samuel Macoduck	242	Mel.

== Loss of the Argo ==
The Argo was abandoned in the North Atlantic after a hurricane, boarded twice and was not seen again after the second boarding, perhaps considered a Ghost ship by the uniformed second crew who were unaware of the rescue. Its final resting place has never been determined. The Argo could have sunk, washed ashore in Ireland or been salvaged without notifying maritime authorities.

- "Ship Argo Capt Macoduck from Baltimore 1 April 1854 for Liverpool experienced on 17 April a violent hurricane from S to NW which threw the vessel on her beam ends; her masts were cut away and she righted a little taking large quantities of water. On the 19th the vessel had 7 feet of water in her hold and was abandoned, the crew being taken off by the Br. ship Mahonongo (Mohongo) Capt Cor(n)ish from Londonderry".
- "LOST SHIPS.—Argo, Macoduck, from Baltimore to Liverpool with breadstuffs was thrown on her beam ends, 17 April in Lat 46 Lon 31 (46°00′N 31°00′W), and on the 19th, was abandoned; crew taken off by the Mahongo (Mohongo), Cor(n)ish, from Londonderry."
- "Messrs Thompson and Nephew (Samuel Thompson's Nephew & Co.) intend presenting to Capt Raymond Cornish of the ship Mohongo of Londonderry an elegant silver trumpet suitably inscribed as a slight acknowledgment of his noble conduct in rescuing Capt Macoduck and the crew from the wreck of the ship Argo on the 19th April last. A heavy sea was running at the time and Capt Cornish effected the rescue at imminent hazard by his small boats - New York Courier".
- "An American ship dismasted and abandoned, hailing from New: York, with port side of archboard washed away, laden with flour and corn, was boarded by the Portland, from New Orleans, in Lon. 30W., and letters were found in her cabin addressed to "Capt. Macodrick," ship Argo. Mem.— The Argo, Macodrick, cleared from Baltimore March 22 for this port."
- "The New City of Cork, from Barbados, at this port, saw, on the 20th ult. in lat. 46°17'N, long. 30°30'W, (46°17′N 30°30′W) a dismasted and abandoned ship (supposed to be the Argo, from Baltimore to this port, reported by the Portland), bearing NE, and bore down to her, and found her to be a ship of about 1000 tons, with painted ports, gilt billet head, main and mizenmasts gone close to the deck, foremast, bowsprit, and jibboom standing, & c. "New York " on her stern, but name gone: to all appearance a new vessel, with perfect rudder and wheel house; did not appear to be waterlogged, or long abandoned."

== External links (passenger lists) ==
- Norway Heritage
- IMTG Vol. 2
- Smith Ancestry
- Genealogy of the Weichmann - Kelley Family of Western New York
- Castle Garden, The Battery Conservancy search results for ship Argo 1841–1849
- Germany Roots, February 14 1842 New York arrivals
- Rupp Family, Bavarian Inn Lodge

== External links (other) ==
- Commercial tariffs and regulations, resources, and trade, of the several states of Europe and America: together with the commercial treaties between England and foreign countries. United States of America, Volume 2
- George Howland junior by William Logan Rodman Gifford, Priv. print. E. Anthony & sons, incorp., printers, 1892 - 56 pages
- The New York State Register, for 1843
- Great Britain. Parliament. House of Commons, H.M. Stationery Office, 1846 - Legislation
- The New York State Register for 1845–46
- Record of the Life and Work of the Rev. Stephen Higginson Tyng and History of St. George's Church, New York: To the Close of His Rectorship, E.P. Dutton, 1890 - 682 pages
- Whitlock advertisement for Argo in New York Evening Mirror, April 3, 1845
- Merchant sail. v.2. p. 1176, Fairburn, William Armstrong, 1876–1947
- Merchant sail. v.2. p. 1297, Fairburn, William Armstrong, 1876–1947
- Merchant sail. v.5. p. 2784, Fairburn, William Armstrong, 1876–1947
- Merchant sail. v.5. p. 2809, Fairburn, William Armstrong, 1876–1947
