= Thought (ship) =

Several ships have been named Thought:

- The Royal Navy purchased HMS Barracouta on the stocks in 1782. After she had served for almost ten years patrolling against smugglers, the Navy sold her in 1792. She became the privateer Thought, which had a successful cruize, capturing several prizes including a French privateer, but then was herself captured in September 1793. She served the French Navy under the names Pensée, Montagne, Pensée, and Vedette, until the British recaptured her in 1800 and renamed her HMS Vidette. The Royal Navy sold her in 1802.
- Thought (1806 ship) was built in Spain in 1803 under another name. She was in British hands by 1806 and she and her crew were lost in the River Clyde in early 1807.
