= Governor King =

Governor King may refer to:

== People ==
- Alvin Olin King (1890–1958), 41st Governor of Louisiana
- Angus King (born 1944), 72nd Governor of Maine
- Austin A. King (1802–1870), 10th Governor of Missouri
- Bruce King (1924–2009), Governor of New Mexico three times between from 1971 and 1995
- Cyril King (1921–1978), 2nd Governor of the United States Virgin Islands
- Edward J. King (1925–2006), 66th Governor of Massachusetts
- John A. King (1788–1867), Governor of New York state from 1857 to 1858
- John W. King (1918–1996), 71st Governor of New Hampshire
- Lucas White King (1856–1925), Anglo-Irish colonial administrator and academic
- Philip Gidley King (1758–1808), third governor of New South Wales, Australia
- Sir Richard King, 1st Baronet (1730–1806), British naval officer and colonial governor
- Samuel Ward King (1786–1851), 15th Governor of Rhode Island
- Samuel Wilder King (1886–1959), 11th Territorial Governor of Hawaii
- William King (Maine governor) (1768–1852), first governor of Maine, United States

== Things ==
- Governor King (ship), an Australian schooner launched 1803 and wrecked 1806 at Newcastle in New South Wales
