= Havre-Union Line =

Packet line

The Havre Union transatlantic packet line was organized in the 1830s from the merger of the Havre Old Line and the Havre Whitlock Line. While the two lines remained independent business entities, they coordinated their sailing schedule and acted as a single line. In the shipping industry, the term packet ship was used to describe a vessel that featured regularly scheduled service on a specific point-to-point line. Usually, the individual ship operated exclusively for the line.

The first American packet line to sail between an American and European port began operating in 1818. It employed four ships and offered a monthly service between New York and Liverpool, England. In 1822 and 1823, three packet lines were organized between New York and Le Havre, France.

== Havre Old Line ==
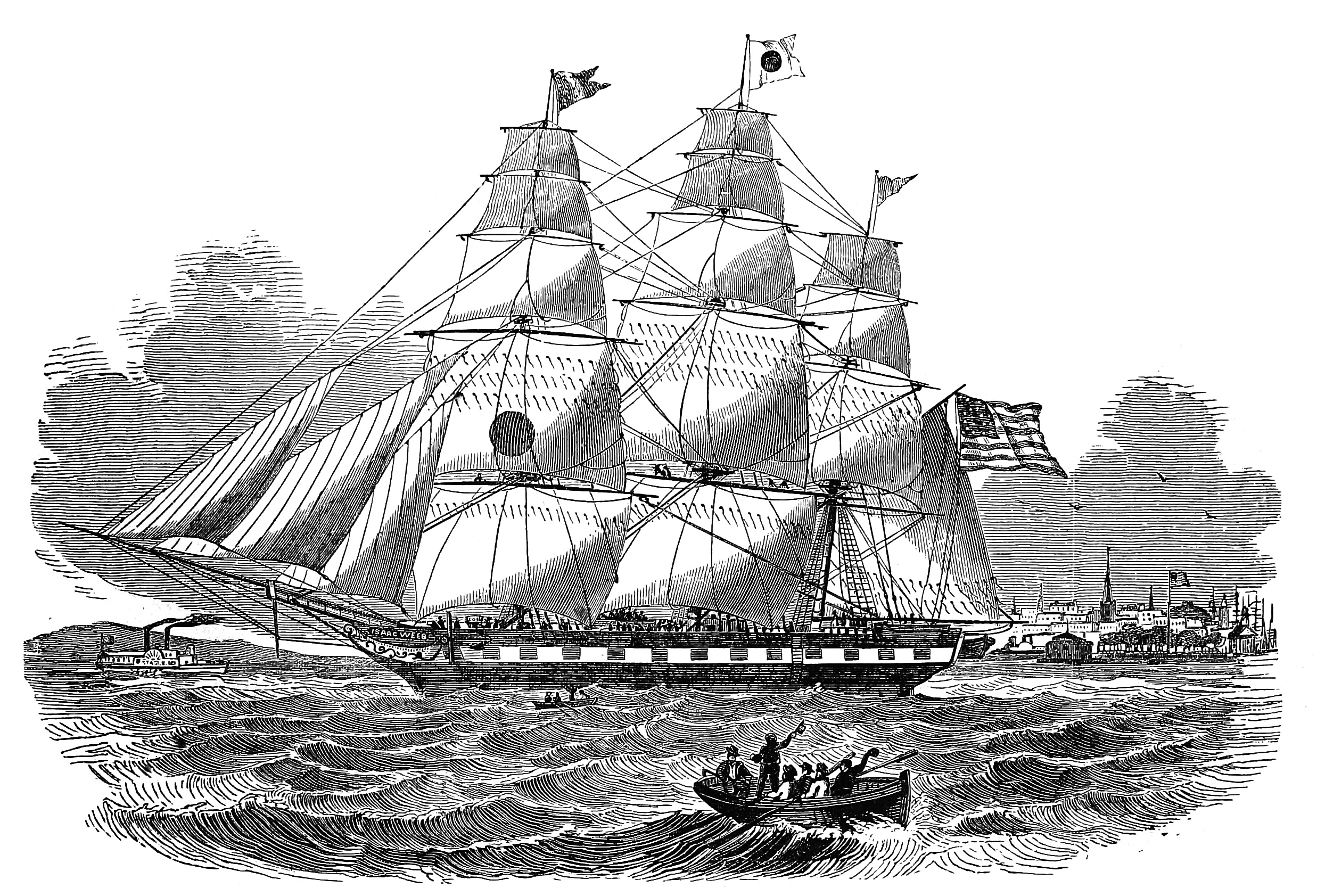
Packet ship Isacc Webb of the Havre Old Line, 1851 – 1854

The early success of the Liverpool packet lines encouraged the organization of packet service between New York and Le Havre, France. In 1822 Francis Depau established the first packet line to run between those two ports. The first ship sailed September 10, 1822, with Miles R. Burke as its captain. The line came to be known as the Havre Old Line.

Francis Depau was born in France in 1773. In 1789, when he was sixteen years old, he went to Saint-Domingue (today's Haiti) to work at his uncle's merchant house. The slave revolt of 1791 forced Depau to relocate to Charleston, South Carolina, where he established his own merchant house. In 1798, he married Sylvie de Grasse, the youngest daughter of the Comte de Grasse, the Admiral who commanded the French fleet at the Battle of the Chesapeake. By 1812 Depau had moved his merchant house to New York City, where he was running a mercantile trading business and a shipping business.

The Havre Old Line started with two ships, the Stephania and Montano. Francis Depau, Isaac Bell, and Capt. Miles R. Burke were the joint owners of the ships. Within a year the Havre Old Line was operating four ships, the Henry and Lewis being added alongside the first two vessels.

Francis Depau's merchant house handled the line's business. His firm owned warehouse space for the storage of goods. It shipped and received goods on its own accounts. It acted as a commission agent for importing goods from France. The firm also moved general freight (cotton, grain, naval stores) for other enterprises. Finally, the firm handled the growing passenger business.

Only four months after the Havre Old Line inaugurated service to Le Havre, the Havre Second Line was organized (January 1823), and shortly after that, William Whitlock, Jr. began a third line.

== Havre Old Line ships ==
Ships in Service for the Havre Old Line

Name	Tons	Built	Service Years	Ave Westbound Passage (days)
Stephania	315	1819	1822 – 1828	39
Montano	365	1822	1822 – 1829	38
Henry	257	1822	1823 – 1826	44
Lewis	412	1822	1823 – 1827	37
Henri IV	427	1826	1826 – 1837	36
Sully	456	1827	1827 – 1846	38
Francois I	496	1828	1828 – 1847	36
Havre (I)	480	1828	1829 – 1837	39
De Rham	492	1829	1829 – 1832	36
Rhone	471	1831	1831 – 1843	38
Charlemagne	442	1828	1832 – 1838	34
Manchester	561	1825	1832 – 1834	41
Francis Depau	595	1833	1833 – 1836	41
Normandie	500	1833	1834 – 1837	37
Sylvie De Grasse	641	1833	1834 – 1848	35
Burgundy	762	1836	1836 – 1848	34
Louis Philippe	794	1837	1837 – 1848	34
Ville de Lyon	791	1837	1837 – 1845	37
Iowa	874	1839	1839 – 1848	33
Zurich	817	1844	1844 – 1863	35
Havre (II)	870	1845	1845 – 1863	34
Admiral	929	1846	1846 – 1863	33
New York	991	1847	1847 – 1855	33
Samuel M. Fox	1062	1850	1851 – 1855	34
Isaac Bell	1072	1851	1851 – 1854	33

== Havre Whitlock Line ==
In 1823 William Whitlock, Jr. established the third packet line between New York and Le Havre, France. Whitlock was the son of a sea captain and ship owner and would become an extensive exporter of raw cotton. In the early 1820s, Whitlock was responsible for establishing coastal packet service between Savannah, Georgia and New York City. These ships delivered southern cotton to New York, which was then transshipped to Europe on Atlantic packet ships. Whitlock's business flourished until the beginning of the American Civil War.

Whitlock began his line with one ship, the 306-ton Cadmus. This vessel sailed in a one-ship line for five years. The Cadmus was replaced in 1829 by the Formosa, a new, 450-ton ship which ran alone until 1831. In that year a second ship, the Albany, was added to make a two-ship line. Then a third ship was added in 1833. By the end of 1838 the Whitlock line was operating four ships, the Albany, Poland, Emerald, and Duchesse d'Orleans.

Unlike other American packet lines, Whitlock was the sole owner and operator of his ships. Usually the agents, builders, and captains of the individual ships were part owners of the vessels. Ships, each with a variety of owners, were then controlled and managed by the line in strict conformity with a general plan. William Whitlock, Jr. was unique in that he owned his ships outright and operated them in his own name.

== Havre Whitlock Line ships ==
Ships in Service for the Havre Whitlock Line

Name	Tons	Built	Service Years	Ave Westbound Passage (days)
Cadmus	306	1818	1823 – 1828	37
Formosa	450	1829	1829 – 1838	40
Albany	468	1831	1831 – 1847	39
Poland	546	1832	1833 – 1840	35
Emerald	518	1835	1838 – 1846	36
Duchesse d'Orleans	798	1838	1838 – 1852	38
Argo	967	1841	1841 – 1849	37
Bavaria	908	1846	1846 – 1853	33
Splendid	642	1846	1847 – 1853	41
Gallia	1190	1849	1849 – 1852	33
Germania	996	1850	1850 – 1863	38
Helvetia	971	1850	1851 – 1864	36
Carolus Magnus	1349		1853 – 1863	34
William Nelson	1039	1850	1856 – 1863	42

== Havre Union Line ==
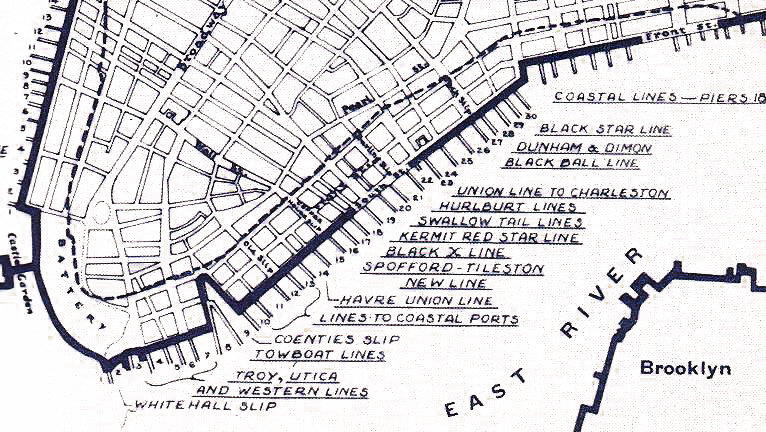
Map of the Port of New York on the south tip of Manhattan Island in 1851. Heavy broken line marks the waterfront below City Hall park in 1784. Area filled in prior to 1820. The Havre Union Line was at Pier 14.

In the 1830s, Whitlock owned three Havre packets outright, operated them in his own name, but ran them in conjunction with the Havre Old Line. Francis Depau had retired in 1830, and his sons-in-law, Samuel M. Fox and Mortimer Livingston, took over the Havre Old Line. After Depau died in 1836, the mercantile business became "Fox & Livingston."

By 1833, the Havre Whitlock Line and the Havre Old Line had joined and were operating under the name Havre Union Line. Whitlock continued to own his own vessels and to act as an agent for his ships while the Havre Old Line ships continued to be owned by various individuals and the firm Fox & Livingston acted as the agent for those vessels.

In 1835, for example, the New York Evening Post contained an announcement that "Havre Packets" on the "Union Line" departed "from New York on the 8th, 16th, and 24th of every month," while returning ships departed "from Havre on the 1st, 8th, and 16th of every month." Departure dates and captains were given for each of eleven ships. The list included eight vessels from the Havre Old Line and three vessels from the Havre Whitlock Line. Today we might describe this arrangement as a "joint venture," although it lasted for quite some time.

The same arrangements existed ten years later. In 1845, The New York State Register identified the agents and ships that operated as the Havre Union Line. It announced that a Havre Union Line ship sailed from New York to Le Havre every month on the 8th, 16th, and 24th, and that a ship sailed from Le Havre every month on the 1st, 8th, and 24th. The sailing scheduled had not change over these ten years. Twelve ships were identified and the agents for the vessels were the firm of William Whitlock, Jr. and the firm of Fox & Livingston. This arrangement, too, had not changed.

Packet Ships of the Havre Union Line, 1845

Name	Tons	Service Years
Sully	456	1827 – 1846
Albany *	468	1831 – 1847
Silvie de Grasse	641	1834 – 1848
Emerald *	518	1838 – 1846
Burgundy	762	1836 – 1848
Ville de Lyon	791	1837 – 1845
Louis Phillippe	794	1837 – 1848
Duchesse d’Orleans *	798	1838 – 1852
Iowa	874	1839 – 1848
Argo *	967	1841 – 1849
Zurich	817	1844 – 1863
Havre II	870	1845 – 1863
Agents, C. Bolton, Fox & Livingston, No. 22 Broad Street; Wm. Whitlock, Jr., 46 South Street, New York (* Ships owned by William Whitlock, Jr.)

The Havre Union Line never became twelve ships controlled by a single merchant house. In April 1845, the New York Evening Mirror contained an advertisement announcing that the "packet ship Argo" would sail on April 8. William Whitlock, Jr. was identified as the agent. The same newspaper contained announcements that the Sully would sail for Le Havre on April 16 and the Silvie de Grasse on April 24. The agent for the latter two ships was the firm of Fox & Livingston, the operators of the Havre Old Line.

- "Packet of the 8th of April—The packet ship Argo, C. Anthony, master, will sail [for Havre] on her regular day. For freight or passage, apply on board, at pier No. 13 East River, or to Wm. Whitlock, Jr., 46 South st."
- "Packet of the 16th of April—The packet ship Sully, Captain Wm. C. Edgar, will sail on her regular day [for Havre]. For freight or passage, apply on board, or to Fox & Livingston, 22 Broad st."
- "Packet of the 24th of April—The packet ship Silvie de Grasse, Capt. Wm. C. Thompson, will sail on her regular day [for Havre]. For freight or passage, apply on board, or to Fox & Livingston, 22 Broad st."

Cooperative control of the Havre Union Line continued until the service was discontinued during the Civil War.

== Lost ships ==
The Havre Old Line had used 25 ships to provide packet service between the years 1822 and 1863. In this forty-year period, three ships were wrecked and two experienced accidents that withdrew them from service. Although the Francois I was repaired and reentered service, the Francis Depau had to be condemned and was sold. The three wrecked ships were lost.

Name	Service Years	Incident
Lewis	1823 – 1827	Wrecked Barnegat Inlet, New Jersey, Mar 6 1827
De Rham	1829 – 1832	Wrecked, Rockaway Beach, Long Island, Mar 31, 1832
Ville de Lyon	1837 – 1845	Wrecked near La Hogue, France, Feb 2, 1845
Francis Depau	1833 – 1836	Condemned and sold after an accident at Havre
Francois I	1828 – 1847	Out of service after an accident 1839-1841

The Havre Whitlock Line had used 14 ships between 1823 and 1864. Only one ship, Poland, was lost while functioning as a packet ship. The Poland entered service in 1833 and burned at sea in 1840. William A. Fairburn told the story of the disaster. The ship sailed from New York for Le Havre on May 11, 1840. Onboard the ship was a crew of thirty-four officers and men, twenty-four cabin passengers, and eleven steerage passengers—a total of sixty-nine people. The ship carried $108,000 in specie, and a cargo consisting of 270 bales of cotton, 2,700 barrels of flour, 22 barrels of potash, and 80 casks of tree bark. The cotton was stowed in the lower forward hold. Although cotton was known to be flammable, the Poland was carrying much less than was typically carried on an eastbound passage.

On May 16, only five days after the departure, a rainstorm occurred. A flash of lightning struck the foremast, ran into the fore hold, and set the cotton on fire. Because the cotton was stowed low, the crew could not get to it, so the men battened down the hatches hoping to smother it. The Poland did not have sufficient small boats to carry all sixty-nine people on the ship. Thus, the passengers filled the boats and were towed astern while the crew remained on the ship. This situation continued for two days, with smoke pouring from the packet and the deck too hot to walk on.

On May 18, a triangular cotton trader named Clifton "fortuitously put in an appearance in the nick of time to rescue the passengers and crew. All on board were saved, but the Poland was totally destroyed by fire."

== End of the line ==
The Havre Union Line operated until 1863-1864 when service was discontinued because of the American Civil War. All the packet lines had carried large amounts of raw cotton from New York to both Liverpool and Le Havre. Compared to the Liverpool lines, however, "the French lines had been virtually sustained … by shipments of southern cotton." Because the War cut New York's supply of cotton, by 1863 the New York to Le Havre packet service had "degenerated into an occasional, desultory sailing."

In the early years of the War, the Havre Old Line reduced its service from eight to three ships a year. In 1863 the Havre Old Line withdrew its remaining vessels and discontinued sailing for Le Havre. In the same year, the Havre Whitlock Line withdrew three of its four vessels, and, thus, in 1864 the Havre Union Line was running only a single ship, the Helvetica, across the ocean. At the end of 1864 Whitlock withdrew that ship as well, ending the Havre Union transatlantic packet service.

== Bibliography ==
- Albion, Robert G. (1965). Square-Riggers on Schedule: The New York Sailing Packets to England, France, and the Cotton Port (reprint ed.). Princeton: Princeton University Press.
- Fairburn, William A. (1945). Merchant Sail, 6 vols. Center Lovell, Me: Fairburn Marine Educational Foundation.
