= James Marr Brydone =

- Born: 1779; Selkirk, Scotland
- Died: 29 March 1866 (aged 86–87); Petworth, West Sussex, England
- Military career
- Allegiance: United Kingdom of Great Britain and Ireland
- Branch: Royal Navy
- Service years: 1804–1834
- Rank: Ship's Surgeon
- Conflicts: Napoleonic Wars; Battle of Trafalgar; Siege of Gaeta; Battle of Anholt

James Marr Brydone (1779 – 29 March 1866) was a Scottish surgeon who served in the British fleet at the Battle of Trafalgar. He is best remembered for being the first person in the main British battle fleet to sight the Franco-Spanish fleet, and did so without the use of a glass. The information was signalled to the fleet flagship, HMS Victory.

== Biography ==
Brydone was born in Selkirk, Scotland, a descendant of William Brydone, who was town clerk of Selkirk at the time of the Battle of Flodden. He was educated at the local school alongside Mungo Park and Charles Malcolm. He qualified as a doctor of medicine from Edinburgh University and, after local experience, in 1804 found himself serving as assistant surgeon aboard the East Indiaman Calcutta. Whilst at sea the ship met a naval vessel whose surgeon had died. He was transferred over and thus began thirty years of service in the Royal Navy. Brydone later contracted yellow fever while at Calcutta, and was sent home to convalesce.

By October 1805 he was serving as assistant surgeon on HMS Thunderer with Nelson's fleet in search of the French and Spanish. In the days of sail, early information was important when advantage had to be gained with the use of the wind. The British commander, Vice-Admiral Lord Nelson, had stationed a chain of frigates to watch the enemy fleet in Cádiz, which had already signalled the combined fleet had put to sea, and reported on its movements. Brydone was the first of the main battle fleet, patrolling off Cape Trafalgar, to see the sails on the horizon – without the use of a glass – and the location of the Franco-Spanish fleet was signalled to HMS Victory, three minutes later battle orders were signalled beginning the Battle of Trafalgar.

Brydone saw further action at the siege of Gaeta (1806) and at the battle of Anholt (1811). After the battle Brydone treated British and Danish casualties alike, carrying out several amputations. Later Brydone's written testimony was presented at the court-martial of a Danish surgeon, accused of causing the death of a wounded Danish officer. He was subsequently acquitted.

After the war Brydone served as the Surgeon Superintendent aboard the convict ship Eliza, which sailed from England on 12 October 1819, with 160 male convicts aboard, and arrived in Sydney Cove on 20 January 1820, having lost only one man during the voyage. Brydone remained in New South Wales until August 1820, and served as President of a Medical Board assembled by Governor Lachlan Macquarie. Brydone eventually returned to England and joined HMS Active under Captain James Gordon in 1821. He later served as assistant staff surgeon at Portsmouth and Deptford dockyards, and finally as staff surgeon at Deptford before retiring from the Navy in 1834.

After his retirement from the Navy, Brydone was engaged by the Earl of Egremont to supervise the transport of Petworth Emigration Scheme emigrants to Canada. He laid down standards of accommodation on board ship and also of reception in Canada, making four trips between 1834 and 1837 to supervise and maintain discipline on board and see the migrants settled on arrival. In the summer of 1838 Brydone travelled to Ireland with Colonel George Wyndham, the 3rd Earl's son and heir, to inspect family estates in County Clare and Limerick, assisting the earl and encouraging emigration to Canada. After spending the winter on secretarial work for the Colonel he was asked to return to Ireland in 1839 to organise emigration. Most people by now preferred Australia as their destination, and at the end of May 183 people from Limerick sailed on the Waterloo. He then settled at Petworth where he became accountant and later acting land agent for Colonel Wyndham, and died at the age of 86.

== Children ==
Brydone married Elizabeth Hislop on 11 June 1818 and the couple had four children:

- Henrietta Jane Brydone, who mixed with the social elite of the Petworth district and married George New, the Rector of Duncton.
- Walter Marr Brydone
- Elizabeth Caroline Brydone
- Henry Gray Brydone was an executor of the Reverend Thomas Sockett's will in 1859. Sockett was James Brydone's brother in law.

== Publications ==
- Brydone, James Marr (1834). Narrative of a Voyage, with a Party of Emigrants, Sent Out from Sussex, in 1834, by the Petworth Emigration Committee, to Montreal, Thence Up the River Ottawa and through the Rideau Canal, to Toronto, Upper Canada, and Afterwards to Hamilton also of the Journey from Hamilton to the Township of Blandford, Where the Families were Settled: And of a Journey through a Large Portion of the London and Gore Districts, with a Map, Shewing the Route; a Description of the State of the Country Generally, and the Nature of the Soil : To which is Added a Comparison of the Route to Upper Canada by Quebec, with that by New York; and Observations on the Proper Mode of Fitting Out Emigrants Ships. Petworth, England: John Phillips.
