= Lord Melville (1825 ship) =

Ship launched at Canotiere, Quebec, 1825

United Kingdom
- Name: Lord Melville
- Owner: Henry Nelson
- Builder: George Taylor Shipyards, Canotiere (Quebec City), Quebec
- Launched: 22 May 1825
- Fate: Wrecked 5 October 1836

General characteristics
- Tons burthen: 425 (bm)

Lord Melville was launched at (George Taylor's shipyard at rue de la Canotiere in Quebec City, Quebec, in May 1825. She made one voyage under charter to the British East India Company (EIC), two voyages transporting convicts to Australia, and one voyage to Canada with emigrants. She was wrecked in 1836 with some loss of life.

== Career ==
EIC voyage (1827–1828): Captain Robert Brown sailed from The Downs on 2 July 1827, bound for Bengal. Lord Melville arrived at Calcutta on 18 November. Homeward bound, she was at Madras on 15 January 1828. She reached Saint Helena on 12 April, and arrived back at The Downs on 21 June.

Convict voyage #1 (1829): Captain Brown sailed Lord Melville from London on 5 January 1829. She arrived at Port Jackson on 6 May 1829. She had embarked 170 male convicts and suffered no deaths en route. The 63rd Regiment of Foot provided the guard detachment.

Convict voyage #2 (1830): Captain Brown sailed Lord Melville from the Downs on 6 June 1830 and arrived at Port Jackson on 22 October. She embarked 176 male convicts and suffered no deaths en route. The 17th Regiment of Foot provided the guard detachment.

Emigrant transport (1832): In 1832 Lord Melville carried working-class emigrants to Canada under the auspices of the Petworth Emigration Scheme. For the voyage her master was a Captain Royal, and the Petworth Scheme's superintendent was William Penfold. She left Portsmouth on 11 April 1832 and arrived at Quebec on 28 May. She carried 173 adults and 136 children under the age of 14.

Year	Master	Owner	Trade	Notes
1830	Brown	Nelson; Huddart & Co.	London–New South Wales	
1835	Redpath	Nichols	Plymouth–Bermuda	

== Fate ==
Lord Melville, Redpath, master, of Plymouth, was wrecked at Saint Pierre and Miquelon on 5 October 1836 with the loss of four lives.

The entry for Lord Melville in Lloyd's Register for 1836 is marked "LOST".
