= Oneida (1841 ship) =

Antebellum North Atlantic shipping

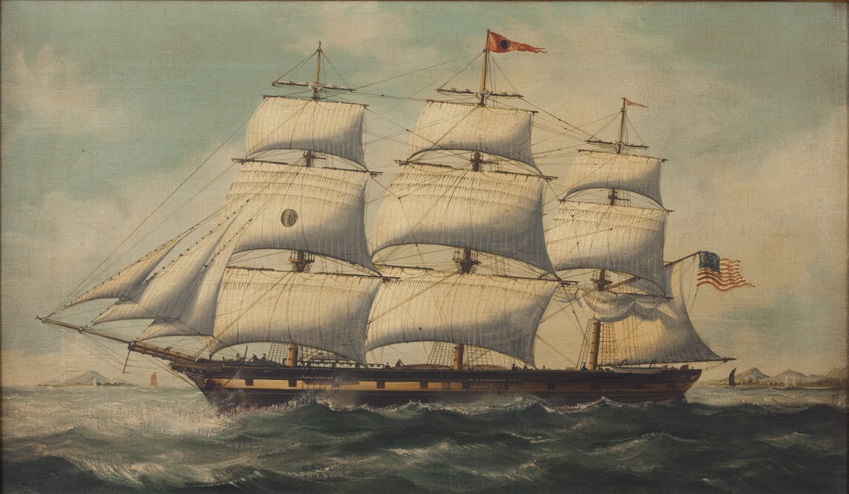
- American packet ship Montezuma (Liverpool Black Ball Line) Built 1843

History

United States
- Name: Oneida
- Owner: John J. Boyd and Edward Hincken
- Builder: Jacob Westervelt
- Laid down: 1840
- Launched: 1841
- Out of service: 1849
- Fate: Wreck, struck rocks

General characteristics
- Class & type: Full-rigged
- Tons burthen: 791 (registered)
- Length: 154.5 ft
- Beam: 34.0 ft
- Draught: 22.3 ft
- Propulsion: Full sail
- Sail plan: Square rigged
- Complement: Permanent crew approx. 20
- Notes: Robert G. Albion, Square-riggers on schedule, 1938, Princeton University Press, p. 286

The wooden sailing ship Oneida was a merchant vessel built for the New York to Le Havre, France packet trade. It was owned by John J. Boyd and Edward Hincken, and it operated on the Havre Second Line.

The Havre Second Line was organized in January 1823 at New York City with four ships. It operated until 1869. The packet trade was characterized by an established line between two ports, regular sailing on a specified day and month, and ships operating exclusively in the service. The Oneida served on the Havre Second Line from 1841 until the end of 1849.

== Construction ==
Merchant ships engaged in the transatlantic packet trade were a distinct category of vessel. According to William A. Fairburn, the turbulent North Atlantic Ocean required sturdiness, fullness, and seaworthiness. The ships were equipped with three masts, all supporting square-riggings. These vessels tended to be wider with more buoyant ends than other types of ships. They were built wider (i.e., a larger beam) to give them greater sturdiness in the furious waters. The strong winds from the west (westerly gales) necessitated conservative spar and sail plans suitable for the conditions usually encountered in the North Atlantic Ocean.

The Oneida was built at the Bergh-Westervelt shipyard in New York City in 1841. Christian Bergh and Jacob Westervelt were two of New York's most important early shipbuilders and they built most of the Havre Second Line packets. Jacob Westervelt supervised the construction of the Oneida. It was 154 feet (47 m) long and 34 feet (10 m) wide, fully masted with square sails, and could carry 791 tons of cargo.

== The Oneida and sister ships ==
In 1840 the ships of the Havre Second Line were the Charles Carroll, Erie, Utica, and Baltimore. The following year, the first two vessels were retired and the St. Nicholas and Oneida were added as their replacements.

Second Line Ships
1840-1841

| Name | Built | Tons | Length (ft in) | Beam (ft in) | Depth (ft in) |
|---|---|---|---|---|---|
| Charles Carroll | 1828 | 411 | 121'2" | 27'3" | 13'7" |
| Erie | 1829 | 451 | 125'0" | 28'2" | 14'1" |
| Utica | 1833 | 525 | 131'2" | 29'7" | 14'8" |
| Baltimore | 1837 | 658 | 139'0" | 32'3" | 22'0" |
| St Nicholas | 1841 | 797 | 148'0" | 34'5" | 21'4" |
| Oneida | 1841 | 791 | 154'5" | 34'0" | 22'3" |

== Packet service ==
The ships of the Havre Second Line each made three round trips per year between New York and Le Havre. The Oneida was scheduled to embark from New York on March 1, July 1, and November 1, and from Le Havre on April 16, August 16, and December 16. This schedule provided about 45 days to complete the eastbound passage plus time at the Port of Havre. Typically, the eastbound leg could be completed in 25–28 days giving the vessel 17–20 days at the foreign port. To complete the westbound passage, the schedule provided about 77 days. The Oneida averaged 39 days for the home bound voyage, giving the vessel a bit more than five weeks at its home port.

Westbound Passage (days)

| Name | Average | Shortest | Longest |
|---|---|---|---|
| Utica | 40 | 35 | 59 |
| Baltimore | 39 | 22 | 78 |
| St Nicholas | 38 | 23 | 63 |
| Oneida | 39 | 28 | 59 |

== Westbound passages of the Oneida ==
The following table shows the Oneida's dates of departure from the Port of Havre, its dates of arrival at the Port of New York, and its master or captain for the voyage. The number of sailing days is the difference between the departure date and arrival date. The date stated on the ship's passenger list is the date used for arrival. The table also shows the number of passengers for each voyage. The number of steerage passengers and cabin passengers is shown for voyages where the passenger list identified the two passenger classes. The June 3 to July 14, 1848 voyage was made from Liverpool, England.

| Departure Date | Arrival Date | Master (Captain) | Days Sailing | All Passengers | Steerage Passengers | Cabin Passengers |
|---|---|---|---|---|---|---|
| 19 Apr 1841 | 22 May 1841 | Funck | 33 | 306 | -- | -- |
| 18 Dec 1841 | 16 Feb 1842 | Funck | 60 | 5 | -- | -- |
| 16 Apr 1842 | 23 May 1842 | Funck | 37 | 293 | 279 | 14 |
| 17 Aug 1842 | 20 Sep 1842 | Funck | 34 | 121 | 108 | 13 |
| 16 Dec 1842 | 29 Jan 1843 | Funck | 44 | 12 | 12 | 0 |
| 18 Apr 1843 | 17 May 1843 | Funck | 29 | 273 | 263 | 10 |
| 16 Aug 1843 | 20 Sep 1843 | Funck | 35 | 92 | -- | -- |
| 18 Dec 1843 | 29 Jan 1844 | Funck | 42 | 21 | -- | -- |
| 17 Apr 1844 | 31 May 1844 | Funck | 44 | 199 | -- | -- |
| 20 Aug 1844 | 17 Sep 1844 | Funck | 28 | 87 | -- | -- |
| 17 Dec 1844 | 17 Feb 1845 | Funck | 62 | 18 | -- | -- |
| 19 Apr 1845 | 31 May 1845 | Funck | 42 | 287 | -- | -- |
| 18 Aug 1845 | 23 Sep 1845 | Funck | 36 | 212 | 194 | 18 |
| 31 Dec 1845 | 20 Feb 1846 | Funck | 51 | 73 | -- | -- |
| 18 Apr 1846 | 23 May 1846 | Funck | 35 | 317 | 295 | 22 |
| 22 Aug 1846 | 28 Sep 1846 | Funck | 37 | 221 | 212 | 9 |
| 1 Jan 1847 | 27 Feb 1847 | Funck | 57 | 73 | 72 | 1 |
| 18 May 1847 | 27 Jun 1847 | Funck | 40 | na | | |
| 22 Sep 1847 | 23 Oct 1847 | Funck | 31 | 292 | 282 | 10 |
| 17 Jan 1848 | 14 Feb 1848 | Willard | 28 | 61 | -- | -- |
| 3 June 1848 (Liverpool) | 14 July 1848 | Willard | 41 | 295 | 279 | 16 |
| 26 Sep 1848 | 28 Oct 1848 | Funck | 32 | 297 | 282 | 15 |
| 20 Jan 1849 | 6 Mar 1849 | Funck | 45 | 137 | 134 | 3 |
| 20 May 1849 | 29 Jun 1849 | Willard | 40 | 294 | 287 | 7 |
| 21 Sep 1849 | 20 Oct 1849 | Willard | 29 | 263 | 259 | 4 |

== Wreck of the Oneida ==
The Oneida sailed from New York City on the December 1, 1849 "with a crew of twenty men and twenty passengers." On December 19, 1849, at about 3 a.m., the ship struck rocks about two miles northwest of the island of Guernsey in the English Channel. According to the Guernsey Star, after an unsuccessful attempt to free the ship, it "was driven on to the rocks on the southern extremity of La Perrelle Bay, where she remained fixed." The rudder was damaged and the mainmast sprung. After the sun rose and the tide fell, "the whole of the passengers and crew, with their personal effects, were subsequently brought, without any accident, to shore."

The account from the Guernsey Star included a description of the ship's cargo and a plan to salvage it before the ship broke apart. "The wreck of the Oneida consists of 1,950 bales of cotton, and a large quantity of provisions, tallow, and ashes, making in the whole nearly 1,000 tons. … A strong force of men, boats, carts and horses is being employed to bring the cargo to land.… The ship, it is believed will become a total wreck, but it is hoped that the materials may be saved."

Five days after the wreck, on December 25, 1849, the London Shipping Gazette updated its readers on the efforts to salvage the ship's cargo. About half the cargo had been brought to land, and the newspaper was optimistic that the whole cargo would be saved. It was also reported that the mainmast and the foremast, with all their sails and rigging, were salvaged. The ship, however, would "probably go to pieces."
