= Petworth Emigration Scheme =

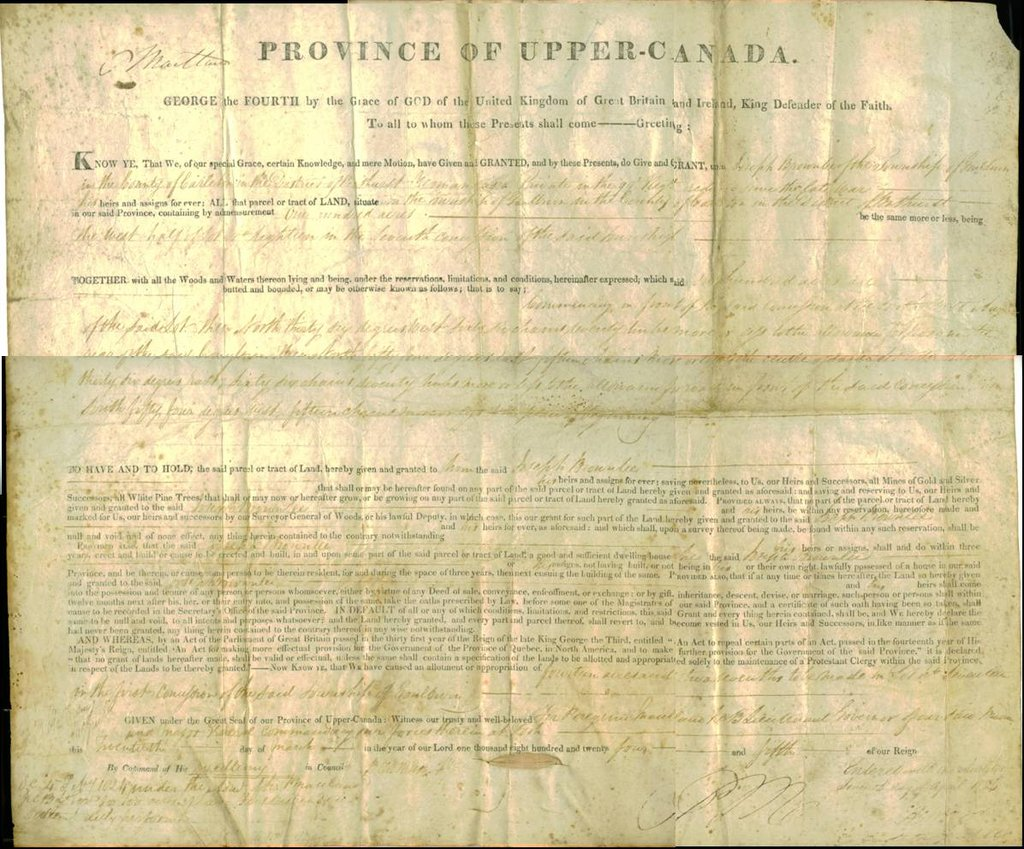
A land deed of 1824 from Upper Canada

The Petworth Emigration Scheme was an initiative sponsored by George Wyndham, 3rd Earl of Egremont and promoted by Thomas Sockett, Anglican Rector of Petworth. It sent around 1800 working-class people from southern England to Upper Canada between 1832 and 1837.

The scheme was part of a larger initiative in Britain during the 1830s in which churches, charitable organisations and private individuals were active in promoting emigration as a solution to overcrowded urban slums, unemployment and rural poverty in Britain.

== Background ==
In the early 19th century, Malthusian predictions of overpopulation seemed to be true in Europe. The disappearance of bubonic plague after the 17th century and the introduction of the smallpox vaccine in the late 18th century had allowed birth rates to exceed death rates in the young and caused population growth. There was no possibility of importing food from outside Europe at that time and so food prices had risen, and with the decline in military employment after the Napoleonic Wars, unemployment and hunger were widespread in the countryside. Shelter and food for the destitute was provided locally by committees of landowners and clerics and varied from one area to another. Funding for that came from the rates, a local property tax, which became higher with increasing poverty. In 1830, an outbreak of civil unrest by desperate agricultural workers, the Swing Riots, occurred in southern England. That prompted the wealthy to look for a way of losing some of the surplus population, especially the more troublesome members, through emigration. Upper Canada was seen as somewhere with unfarmed land to settle and not too costly to reach but far enough that people would not easily come back.

== Petworth Emigration Committee ==
Thomas Sockett was a moving force behind the scheme. From humble beginnings, he had been tutor to the more important of the Earl of Egremont's many children, all illegitimate, and secretary to the Earl. Encouraged by the Earl, he had graduated at Oxford University so that he could be ordained into the Anglican church and become Rector of Petworth to give him an independent living. He formed a committee of three with Thomas Chrippes and William Knight.

The Earl was willing to pay the £10 per person cost of the voyage for those on his land, and the parish funds gave a further £10 for warm winter clothing, blankets and other supplies and equipment. Sockett used his network of wealthy contacts to recruit potential emigrants from across the southern counties of England, chartered ships and appointed supervisors to maintain discipline on the voyage and see the immigrants settled in Canada. To encourage further migration, it was important that the scheme had a good reputation and so only good quality ships were hired. There were problems with the early supervisors, and from 1834 to 1837, the task was undertaken by Sockett's brother in law, James Marr Brydone, a naval surgeon who had been at the Battle of Trafalgar. The Poor Law Amendment Act 1834 increasingly interfered with local freedom of action by bringing a harsher regíme, as the Poor Law Commission decided that other agencies could transport the emigrants more cheaply, and no more ships were chartered after 1837.

== Voyage ==
The crossing by sailing ship took about seven weeks to Quebec, with very cramped living conditions consisting of a 6-foot (1.8 m) square berth for three adults or six children. Cooking was done by the passengers using stoves on deck. Ships used included the England, the British Tar, the Lord Melville, and the Diana (1837). The voyage was longer but cheaper than going to the United States because the migrants were providing a return cargo for ships bringing timber to England. Ships would be towed up the St. Lawrence River to Montreal by wood-fired steam tugs. At Montreal, the passengers had to transfer to barges, known as Durham boats to ascend the St. Lawrence Rapids, to Prescott before they caught a steamer to Kingston and Toronto. When the Rideau Canal was open, the rapids could be avoided by using the Ottawa River and the canal.

== People ==
About 1,800 people were sent to Canada by the scheme mostly from 1832 to 1837 although 170 went from 1838 to 1850 on ships of other agents. The emigrants consisted of unemployed single men and families dependent on a lone wage earner. Arable workers were more heavily represented than those working with livestock and were seasonally employed. The series of poor harvests that culminated in the Swing Riots suggested that poor employment prospects would continue. Skilled rural artisans and trades people were also represented in the Petworth emigrants. Although they had enough standing to be distinguished from agricultural labourers in status and wage, the seasonal nature of their work resulted in à similar instability. As they made a good wages during the summer months, they were expected to make ends meet year round and were overlooked by the vestry when it came to off-season assistance. Former soldiers often did not settle easily into life back home and had the incentive of being entitled to claim 100 acres (40 hectares) of uncleared land, but other migrants were given 5 acres (2 hectares).

== Sources ==
- Cameron, Wendy; Maude, Mary McDougall (2000). Assisting Emigration to Upper Canada: The Petworth Project, 1832–1837. McGill–Queen's University Press. ISBN 978-0-7735-6832-7. JSTOR j.ctt8120w.
- Haines, Sheila; Lawson, Leigh (September 2007). Poor Cottages and Proud Palaces: The Life and Work of the Reverend Thomas Sockett of Petworth 1777–1859. Hastings Press. ISBN 978-1-904109-16-7.
- Jerrome, Peter (2006). Petworth from 1660 to the present day. The Window Press.
