= William J. Romer =

Sandy Hook Pilot boat

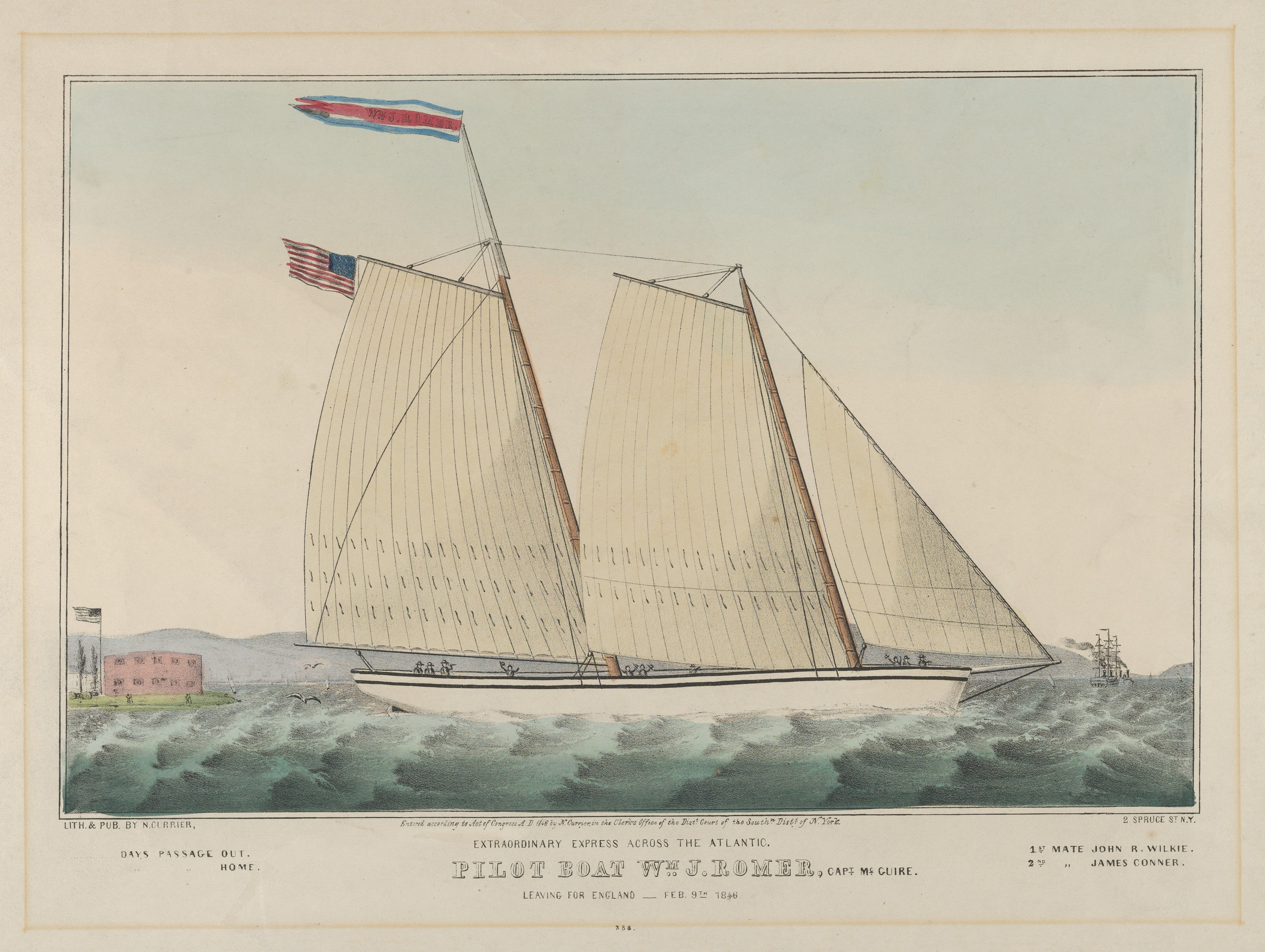
- Pilot Boat Wm J. Romer, Capt James McGuire, Leaving for England – February 9th, 1846

History

United States
- Name: William J. Romer
- Owner: James J. Wilkie, James Conner, Robert W. Johnson, and George H. Sisco.
- Operator: James McGuire; George H. Sisco (1860)
- Builder: John & James Friend shipyard
- Cost: $4,000
- Launched: 1841
- Out of service: July 20, 1863
- Stricken: Romer Shoal
- Fate: Sank

General characteristics
- Class & type: schooner
- Tonnage: 50-tons TM
- Length: 70 ft 0 in (21.34 m)
- Depth: 10 ft 0 in (3.05 m)
- Propulsion: Sail

The William J. Romer was a 19th-century pilot boat built in 1841 by John & James Friend for New York Pilots. She was considered one of the fastest pilot-boats out of New York. In 1846, the Romer sailed across the Atlantic on a special express trip to Liverpool, England. The Romer Shoal Light was named for the Romer, which sank there in 1863.

== Construction and service ==
The pilot-boat William J. Romer, No. 12, was built in New York in 1841 by John & James Friend shipyard, valued at $4,000. She was owned by James J. Wilkie, James Conner, Robert W. Johnson, and George H. Sisco.

On February 9, 1846, the Romer was selected to sail across the Atlantic, for a faster trip than with conventional Packet boats. She went on a special express trip to Liverpool, England to obtain the latest news from Great Britain regarding the United States acquiring land in Oregon and England's position on the matter.

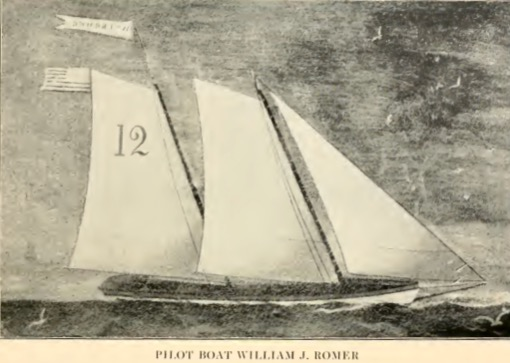
Pilot Boat William J. Romer

On the way over the Romer overcame a heavy storm. The Cork Harbour was reached on March 10, 1846. Monroe Gale went to Liverpool with his mail and Tribune dispatches. The Romer returned to New York on April 11, 1846. On June 15, 1846, Secretary of State James Buchanan and British Minister Richard Pakenham signed a treaty that settled the Oregon boundary dispute by agreeing upon lat. 49 N. as the boundary-line.

On March 12, 1860, the Sandy Hook pilot-boat William J. Romer, No. 12, was sold to go to Texas, to be used as a pilot-boat at the port of Galveston.

On October 10, 1860, New York Sandy Hook Pilot George H. Sisco, of the pilot boat William J. Romer, No. 1, signed a statement along with other pilots, that he was satisfied with the representation he had received from the New York Board of Commissioners of Pilots.

== End of service ==
On July 20, 1863, during the American Civil War the pilot-boat William J. Romer was wrecked off Barnegat Bay. She struck a submerged rock and sank, with the loss of one pilot. The Romer Shoal Light in New York Harbor was named for the Romer that sank there.

== See also ==
- List of Northeastern U. S. Pilot Boats
