= Nancy (1803 ship) =

1803 Australian ship

Coordinates: 35.367°S 150.834333°E

History
- Name: Nancy
- Port of registry: UK, Sydney
- Builder: Kable & Co, Hawkesbury River, New South Wales
- Launched: 1803
- Fate: Wrecked south of Jervis Bay, 18 April 1805

General characteristics
- Type: sloop
- Tonnage: 20 GRT

Nancy was a sloop launched in 1803 and wrecked on 18 April 1805 near Jervis Bay, Australia.

Nancy was a sloop of some 20 tons constructed on the Hawkesbury River, New South Wales by Kable & Co. It arrived in Sydney on its maiden voyage on 17 October 1803. On 18 April 1805, Nancy commanded by Captain Demaria was just off Jervis Bay when a violent squall hit the area. Nancy's mainsail split and the ship could not make way. Everything on board was washed overboard and then the ship struck a small sandy beach between two headlands. The ship promptly broke up with one crew member, Richard Wall, from Exeter, drowning. The remaining crew walked to Sydney, arriving on 1 May 1805.
