= Havre Second Line =

Transatlantic shipping company

The Havre Second Line was a business organization that provided packet service between the Ports of New York and Le Havre, France. William A. Fairburn identified four characteristics of a packet service. (1) a regular line between ports; (2) ships operating exclusively in the service; (3) common ownership of the operating ships and associated facilities by individuals, a partnership, or a corporation; and (4) regular sailing on a specified day of a certain month.

The first American packet line between an American port and a European port began operating in 1818. It offered a monthly service between New York and Liverpool with four ships. The first New York to Le Havre, France packet line was organized in 1822 and came to be known as the "Old Line." The following year a second line was organized, which was known as the Havre Second Line. This line continued regular packet service between the Ports of New York and Le Havre until 1870.

== Background ==
The historical dilemma facing United States commerce in the years following 1815 was that (1) because the United States, as an independent nation, lost favored treatment from Great Britain, American shipping was excluded from the West Indies trade and from trade with Great Britain's Canadian colonies. (2) Stagnating demand for American staples (tobacco, wheat, and flour) in Europe limited commercial opportunities with the continent. Thus, Europe did not offer sufficient demand for the goods produced in American's northern regions. Northern shippers, therefore, did not have sufficient return freight for the ships which brought European wares to Boston, New York, Philadelphia, and Baltimore. New York merchants were able to resolve this dilemma and dominate transatlantic trade. Raw cotton became the eastbound cargo that filled so many of their ships.

In the years following 1815, Robert G. Albion wrote, New York merchants were able to drag the cotton trade between the South and Europe "two hundred miles out of its normal course in order that they might exact their lucrative toll from it and secure eastbound cargoes." To clinch this "abnormal arrangement," New York merchants developed the coastal packet trade between New York and the southern cotton ports. Without this trade, Albion claims, New York shippers "would have found it extremely difficult to make the eastbound trips of the ocean packets profitable." Thus, part of the South's cotton went to Europe by way of New York, and a far greater proportion of the South's imports of European goods came by the same indirect route. "It may be argued," Albion continues, that the coastal packet trade "brought more business to the port [of New York] than did the Erie Canal and that without it New York could not have attained its commanding position in handling the nation's imports."

The economic historian Douglass North maintained that the source of American economic expansion in the years between 1823 and 1843 was to be found in the "export trade to the rest of the world." The development of a transatlantic packet trade in the years between 1818 and 1823, in the Port of New York, serving Liverpool, England and Le Havre, France was directly tied to that expansion. Both the transatlantic packet trade and the coastal packet trade were part of what North called "an era of readjustment" to the conditions presented by the North Atlantic Economy.

== Establishment ==
The Havre Second Line was organized on January 13, 1823 with four ships, one of which sailed from New York the first of each month. Throughout its history, the line was loosely organized in terms of asset ownership. No two ships had identical owners. The builders owned shares in several, but not all, the ships. The captains also had a share in most of the vessels. A few captains were the sole owner of their ship. Shares of the ships were also owned by merchants and investors.

The day-to-day operation of the line was placed in the hands of John J. Boyd. Boyd's business partner, Dominick Crassous, acted as ship broker. In 1833, Crassous was replaced by Edward Hincken. According to Albion, "Crassous held no share in any of the line's ships, while Boyd and Hincken only gradually came into ownership at all, and then only in a few of the ships." John J. Boyd spent most of his time managing other people's ships.

In 1851, Boyd & Hincken contracted with the shipbuilding firm of Westervelt & Mackey to design and construct the Mercury. The fractional owners of this ship included John J. Boyd with 2/16th of a share, Edward Hincken with 1/16th share, the builder Jacob A. Westervelt with 3/16th of a share, and the master of the ship, Captain Richard D. Conn, with 2/16th share. The other half of the shares were distributed among six additional individuals.

== List of ships ==
Ships in Service for the Havre Second Line

Name	Year built	Service Years	Tons	Length (ft-in)	Beam (ft-in)	Depth (ft-in)
Marmion	1811	1823 – 1824	277	94' 4"	25' 10"	12' 11"
Bayard	1819	1823 – 1829	339	99' 0"	28' 0"	14' 0"
Don Quixote	1823	1823 – 1829	260	97' 0"	24' 6"	12' 3"
Paris	1823	1823 – 1823	338	103' 0"	27' 3"	13' 7"
Howard	1822	1823 – 1827	336	107' 0"	26' 6"	13' 3"
Queen Mab	1824	1824 – 1828	270	92' 0"	25' 0"	13' 4"
Desdemona	1823	1824 – 1826	294	97' 6"	26' 2"	13' 1"
Edward Quesnel	1824	1824 – 1831	388	106' 0"	28' 10"	14' 5"
Edward Bonaffe	1824	1825 – 1830	325	102' 0"	26' 10"	13' 5"
France	1827	1827 – 1837	411	116' 6"	28' 0"	14' 0"
Charlemagne	1828	1828 – 1832	442	124' 0"	28' 0"	14' 0"
Charles Carroll	1828	1828 – 1840	411	121' 2"	27' 3"	13' 7"
Erie	1829	1829 – 1840	451	125' 0"	28' 2"	14' 1"
Utica	1833	1833 – 1848	525	131' 2"	29' 7"	14' 8"
Baltimore	1837	1837 – 1851	658	139' 0"	32' 3"	22' 0"
St Nicholas	1841	1841 – 1859	797	148' 0"	34' 5"	21' 4"
Oneida	1841	1841 – 1850	791	154' 5"	34' 0"	22' 3"
St Denis	1848	1848 – 1856	959	161' 4"	36' 1"	21' 2"
William Tell	1850	1850 – 1862	1153	175' 0"	37' 10"	29' 2"
Mercury	1851	1851 – 1869	1350	193' 6"	38' 10"	22' 2"
William Frothingham	1851	1857 – 1868	830	163' 0"	33' 6"	21' 6"
Jacob A Stamler	1856	1864 – 1870	1050	175' 0"	37' 0"	25' 5"

== Shipbuilding ==
Most of the packet ships used on the Havre Second Line were built at the Bergh-Westervelt shipyard in New York City. According to Fairburn, Christian Bergh was one of New York's two most important early shipbuilders. Between 1819 and 1837, he built 33 regular transatlantic packet ships as well as many other ships for other purposes. Ten of the Havre Second Line's ships were built by Christian Bergh at his New York yard.

Several years before his retirement in 1837, Bergh took Jacob A. Westervelt into partnership. Westervelt had been an apprentice for Bergh, and he worked on the building of many packet ships for that shipyard. From 1837 until his death in 1853, Westervelt was the master-builder of 26 transatlantic packet ships, most of these in partnership with William Mackey. For the Havre Second Line, Westervelt built six packet ships.

The transatlantic packet ships were built for a specific purpose and were considered a distinct class of ship. According to Albion, "In all the history of merchant ships under sail, there was probably no sturdier group than the New York packets on the North Atlantic run, nor was any group better adapted to the work at hand." The turbulent North Atlantic, particularly in the winter time, with its westerly gales, as well as the commercial requirements of three voyages per year necessitated a distinctive type of sailing vessel. Fairburn explained that the sailing packets were built fuller and generally beamier, with more buoyant ends, than other deep ocean ships. They also employed conservative spar and sail plans suitable for the wind and sea conditions usually encountered in the North Atlantic Ocean. These characteristics made the transatlantic packets "suitable for the steady month-after-month pounding in the North Atlantic trade." The ships had well-balanced hulls and riggings, and could be "driven hard hour after hour, day after day, with never a minute of letup."

== Ships in service ==
Packet service from New York City to Le Havre, France took several years to establish itself. The first group of vessels employed on the Havre Second Line were not built specifically for transatlantic packet service. The Marmion was a small Baltimore-built ship of only 277 tons. It was replaced after only one year of service by the Queen Mab which had been built as a Savannah coastal trader. The Bayard and the Howard were built as a general trader, but brought into service for the packet trade.

In the first two years of operation (1823 and 1824), the Havre Second Line brought eight ships into service. These vessels (excluding the Paris) operated an average of only 4.4 years. The Marmion was used for only one year, the Desdemona for only two. The longest servicing ship among the first eight vessels, was the Edward Quesnel which lasted seven years on the line.

One of the first eight ships, the Paris, was wrecked on it second voyage to Le Havre. For this reason it was excluded from the calculation of the average years of service. The Paris was launched in April 1823 and was owned outright by its captain, Henry Robinson. On November 1, 1823, near the end of the ship's second eastbound voyage, it was wrecked off the coast of Cherbourg, France.

Between 1825 and 1829 five more ships entered service on the Havre Second Line. For this group of ships, the average years of service more than doubled to 9.6 years. In addition, the size of the vessels was becoming larger. The eight earliest ships were small for transatlantic service. The average tonnage for this group of ships was a bit over 300 tons. The average tonnage of the next five ships was a bit over 400 tons, or 33 percent larger. Among the next five ships that entered service, the average tonnage was almost 750 tons.

Each year, the ships of the Havre Second Line made three round trip voyages between New York and Le Havre. This schedule required one eastbound and one westbound passage every four months. The schedule changed little from year to year. The following table shows the schedule posted in the New York Herald in 1842.

The ships of this line will hereafter leave New York on the 1st and Havre on the 16th of each month as follows:
	From New York	From Havre
Oneida; Capt. James Funck	1 March; 1 July; 1 November	16 April; 16 August; 16 December
Baltimore; Capt. Edward Funck	1 April; 1 August; 1 December	16 May; 16 September; 16th January
Utica; Capt. Frederick Hewitt	1 May; 1 September; 1 January	16 June; 16 October; 16th February
St Nicholas; Capt. J.B. Pell	1 June; 1 October; 1 February	16 July; 16 November; 16 March

The schedule provided about 45 days to complete the eastbound passage and to layover at the Port of Havre. Typically, the eastbound leg could be completed in 25–28 days giving the vessel 17–20 days at the foreign port. To complete the westbound passage, the schedule provided about 77 days. The average westbound passage on the Havre Second Line was 37 days, but it could take much longer, especially in the winter. For an average passage, the schedule provided about 40 days at home.

In the twenty-five years between 1830 and 1855, eleven ships were used to maintain this schedule. The four-vessel fleets for representative years are shown in the following table.

1830	1835	1840	1845	1850	1855
Edward Bonaffe; France; Erie; Charles Carroll	Utica; France; Erie; Charles Carroll	Utica; Baltimore; Erie; Charles Carroll	Utica; Baltimore; Oneida; St Nicholas	St Denis; Baltimore; William Tell; St Nicholas	St Denis; Mercury; William Tell; St Nicholas

== Westbound passage ==
For transatlantic sailing vessels, there was a great difference between the mileage of an eastbound passage and the mileage of the westbound passage. On the former, the sailing ship was going with a prevailing west wind and with the Gulf Stream current. On the latter, however, the ship was facing the opposite conditions — against a prevailing west wind and into the Gulf Stream current. Thus, westbound sailing was always much slower than the outbound trip.

Regularity was the keynote of the packet service, according to Albion. "It was the struggle to secure fairly uniform passage, month in and month out, that the owners wanted." A packet which could make five-week passages winter and summer was better from the line's point of view than one which might cross in three weeks with favorable wind in April and then take nine or ten weeks the following February.

The following table shows the average westbound passage among the packet lines serving Havre and Liverpool for the years 1841 to 1850.

Length of Westbound Passage by Line
Ships Entering Service between 1841 and 1850

Name	Average passage	Shortest passage	Longest passage
Le Havre Lines			
Havre Old Line	33.8	20	56
Havre Second Line	37.0	23	63
Havre Whitlock	36.4	20	73
All Havre lines	35.8		
Liverpool Lines			
Black Ball	32.9	16	60
Red Star	33.2	18	59
Blue Swallowtail	35.2	18	89
Dramatic	34.0	23	53
New Line	34.2	18	56
All Liverpool lines	34.0		

The ships of the Havre Second Line had a reputation of being "the slowest of all the packets." Albion attributes this fact in part "to the loose organization, which gave the operator much less discipline over the captains than was the case in more compact lines." Fairburn attributes it to the randomness of weather in the North Atlantic. "Extreme and record-making voyages for sailing vessels, particularly on the North Atlantic westward run, were largely a matter of luck, and any good packet ably commanded would make excellent time if given the proper kind and force of wind and favorable sailing conditions."

Both Albion and Fairburn provide the shortest, longest, and average westbound passage for ships on each of the major packet lines. That data is reproduced in the following table for the ships of the Havre Second Line.

Length of Westbound Passage by Ship

Name	Service Years	Years	Average	Shortest	Longest
Marmion	1823 – 1824	1	38	26	46
Bayard	1823 – 1829	6	36	18	52
Don Quixote	1823 – 1829	6	36	30	45
Paris	1823 – 1823	--	--	--	
Queen Mab	1824 – 1828	4	40	28	49
Howard	1823 – 1827	5	36	26	48
Desdemona	1824 – 1826	2	39	35	49
Edward Quesnel	1824 – 1831	7	42	27	61
Edward Bonaffe	1825 – 1830	5	39	29	57
France	1827 – 1837	10	42	31	55
Charlemagne	1828 – 1832	10	41	23	59
Charles Carroll	1828 – 1840	12	41	30	66
Erie	1829 – 1840	11	42	24	82
Utica	1833 – 1848	15	40	35	59
Baltimore	1837 – 1851	14	39	22	78
St Nicholas	1841 – 1859	18	38	23	63
Oneida	1841 – 1850	9	39	28	59
St Denis	1848 – 1856	8	35	25	52
William Tell	1850 – 1862	12	36	25	60
Mercury	1851 – 1869	18	33	23	49
William Frothingham	1857 – 1868	11	39	27	60
Jacob A Stamler	1864 – 1870	6	35	24	50

An illustration of the bad weather that could affect a North Atlantic winter crossing was given by the New York press for the 60-day passage of the St. Nicholas. It sailed from Le Havre on November 22, 1848 but did not reached New York until January 21, 1849:

The St. Nicholas has experienced heavy weather during the passage, hurricanes and strong westerly gales; [the ship] has been stripped of her canvas three times, blowing the sails from the yards. On 24th Dec. Nathaniel Hasting, seaman, while furling the foretopsail fell from the yard overboard and drowned. Three others were also thrown off but saved. On 29th carried away fore yard; was seven days with head sails, the sea being so bad could not replace it; had few sails left to set, in consequence of which was driven into the Gulf Stream with heavy N.W. gales; remained there 26 days without being able to get out.

Five ships that serviced during the 1830s had an average westbound crossing of 40 or more days. They were the France, Charlemagne, Charles Carroll, Erie, and Utica. The Erie with an average passage of 42 days had a reputation for slow passages. The ship entered service on the Havre Second Line in 1829. It was the only transatlantic packet ship to have made three westward passages of over 70 days. In 1837 the Erie took 82 days to make a winter crossing. When the vessel finally arrived at New York Harbor, newspaper reporters expected to hear a story of fierce gales and turbulent seas. Instead, the ship's captain reported that, "for forty days we lay becalmed on the Newfoundland banks." He spoke not of gales or damage to spars and sails, but "of the great quiet of the elements."

The France joined the Erie with an average westbound passage of 42 days. The Charlemagne and Charles Carroll, which also operated in the 1830s, were only one day faster with an average westbound passage of 41 days. Usually, the Havre ships made slower time than the ships in the Liverpool or London runs. Fairburn attributed this to the fact that the Havre packets generally sailed a more southerly course across the ocean. They therefore experienced less wind and had to combat a stronger Gulf Stream. They may have also been subject to more fog associated with a warmer crossing.

== Lost ships ==
The Havre Second Line lost four ship in its 47 years of operation.

Paris	1823	Wrecked near Cherbourg on its second eastbound passage.
Oneida	December 19, 1849	Wrecked near Guernsey on an eastbound passage to Havre.
St Denis	January 1856	Filled with water and sank in a gale 180 miles east of Sandy Hook, New Jersey.
St Nicholas	1859	Burned at New York following an explosion.

== End of the line ==
Sailing ships running in the transatlantic packet trade began seeing competition from steam vessels in the late 1840s. A steam powered packet service between New York and Liverpool began in 1848. Over the next decade steam powered vessels took away the mail, most of the first-class passengers, and the express freight business. This competition threatened the business profits of the sailing packet lines, but it took time before steam powered ships dominated the trade.

The development of steam transportation, even after the invention of the screw propeller, was not so rapid as might have been expected. As sailing ships lost the most profitable cargoes, they became increasingly to function as regular freighters on a schedule, carrying bulk in both directions. Sailing vessels continued to carry bulk freight — cotton, naval stores, grain, and flour — on their eastbound voyage. On the return trip iron, railroad equipment, and machinery filled the sailing ships' cargo space.

Steam vessels secured only a very small proportion of the transatlantic passenger business until the American Civil War. It was not until 1865 that more steerage passengers came by steam than by sail; and for more than a decade after that date sailing vessels still had a considerable share of the business.

The introduction of steam powered shipping on runs between New York and France was slow to develop. An early attempt to introduce stream powered packet service between New York and Cherbourg, France was unsuccessful. This encouraged the Le Havre sailing lines to add ships in the 1850s. The Havre Second Line added the Mercury in 1851 and the William Frothingham in 1857. By 1858, however, two steamships were running between New York and Le Havre.

Although noisy and dirty "shaking smoke boxes," steam powered vessels were faster than the sailing vessel, especially on the westbound passage. In 1867 steamers from New York to Havre crossed in fourteen days. The transition to steamship service both shortened and cheapened the voyage.

Commercial disruptions caused by the American Civil War added to the strains facing the transatlantic packet lines. In 1862 the Havre Second Line withdrew the William Tell from transatlantic packet service. The Line then functioned with only two vessels, the Mercury and the William Frothingham.

By 1863 Havre-New York packet services had "degenerated into an occasional, desultory sailing." The Havre Old Line terminated service in 1863. The Whitlock Line continued to run one ship in 1864, but then terminated that service as well. The Havre Second Line had only two ships on the run between 1862 and 1864. The Jacob A. Stamler, which had been operating as a regular trader, joined the line in 1864, filling some of the space vacated by the two Havre Lines. By the end of the decade, however, all three Havre Second Line ships had been withdrawn from service. The William Frothingham was withdrawn in 1868, the Mercury in 1869, and the Jacob A. Stamler in 1870.

== Bibliography ==
- Albion, Robert G. (1965). Square-Riggers on Schedule: The New York Sailing Packets to England, France, and the Cotton Port (reprint ed.). Princeton: Princeton University Press.
- Fairburn, William A. (1945a). Merchant sail, vol. 2. Center Lovell, Me: Fairburn Marine Educational Foundation.
- Fairburn, William A. (1945b). Merchant sail, vol. 3. Center Lovell, Me: Fairburn Marine Educational Foundation.
- Fairburn, William A. (1945c). Merchant sail, vol. 5. Center Lovell, Me: Fairburn Marine Educational Foundation.
- North, Douglass C. (1961). The Economic Growth of the United States, 1790-1860. Englewood Cliffs, N. J.: Prentice-Hall.
- Page, Thomas W. (1911). "The Transportation of Immigrants and Reception Arrangements in the Nineteenth Century". Journal of Political Economy. 19 (9): 732–749. doi:10.1086/251922. S2CID 153795259.
