= Sir William Burroughs (1803 ship) =

United Kingdom
- Name: Sir William Burroughs
- Namesake: Sir William Burroughs, 1st Baronet
- Owner: Various
- Builder: Calcutta
- Launched: 1803
- Captured: 1807
- Fate: Last listed 1820

General characteristics
- Tons burthen: 569, or 600, 620 (bm)
- Armament: 10 guns

Sir William Burroughs was a merchant vessel launched in 1803 at Calcutta. A French privateer captured her in 1807 and the British recaptured her in 1810. She made one voyage for the British East India Company (EIC) in 1812. She is last listed in 1820.

== Career ==
Sir William Burroughs's early career is currently obscure. One report in 1809, using earlier information, gave the name of her captain as James Haig, and her owner as Sheik Golam Hussain/

Haig was still captain when the privateer captain Robert Surcouf, in Revenant, captured the 10-gun Sir William Burroughs on 18 December 1807. (Note: One source reports that the French captured Sir William Burroughs in 1806. An earlier one reports that the capture occurred in 1808. However, the most detailed information puts the capture in 1807.)

The British attacked Île de France and captured it on 3 December 1810. One of the vessels they recaptured was William Burroughs of "1000 tons" (bm). She later appeared on a list of transports that supported the invasion and its aftermath.

After the invasion, the British chartered some nine vessels, Sir William Burroughs among them, as cartels to carry back to France the French troops that they had captured.

Sir William Burroughs, Shaik Gulhum Homain, owner, appeared on a list of vessels registered at Calcutta in January 1811.

On 9 January 1812 Sir William Burroughs was again at Mauritius. There she embarked the headquarters and six companies of the 86th Regiment of Foot. (The remaining four companies followed on Helen.) On 21 February Sir William Burroughs delivered her troops to Madras.

William Burroughs paid £3858 11s 3d on 15 July 1812 for outfitting for a return voyage to India.

Captain Thomas Watken Court sailed from Bengal on 18 September 1812, bound for England. Sir William Burroughs was at Mauritius on 21 November. She then reached the Cape on 17 January and Saint Helena on 2 February 1813. She arrived at The Downs on 14 May. She entered Lloyd's Register in 1813 with Court, master and owner, and trade London–India.

She paid £2473 7s 4d on 31 December 1813 for outfitting for a return voyage. She had also undergone repairs.

== Fate ==
Sir William Burroughs is last listed in Lloyd's List in 1819, and in the Register of Shipping in 1820. Both show Court as master and owner, and her trade as London–India.
