= Paragon (1803 ship) =

History

United States
- Name: Paragon
- Builder: Portsmouth, Virginia
- Launched: 1803
- Fate: Sold 1803

United Kingdom
- Name: Paragon
- Acquired: 1803 by purchase
- Fate: Sold c.1807

United States
- Name: Paragon
- Acquired: c.1807 by purchase
- Fate: Wrecked 1828

General characteristics
- Tons burthen: 295, 309, 310 (bm)
- Complement: 23

Paragon was launched at Portsmouth, Virginia, in 1803. She immediately sailed for Great Britain and thereafter sailed for some time as a merchantman under the British flag. She then made three whaling voyages between 1819 and 1828, and sank at sea near Oahu on her third.

== Career ==
Paragon first appeared in Lloyd's Register in 1803 with W. Worden, master, Cating, owner, and voyage Dublin–London. The next year her master and owner changed to W. Byron, and her voyage to Bristol–Virginia. She traded between Britain and the United States, and in 1806–1807 her ownership changed back to the United States, though she continued to be listed in Lloyd's Register.

Year	Master	Owner	Trade	Source and notes
1805	W. Byron	Captain & Co.	Bristol–Virginia	Register of Shipping (RS)
1807	W.Byron; J. Myrick	Capt. & Co. Day & Co.	Hull–New York City	Lloyd's Register (LR); Day & Co. were American owners
1810	J. Myrick	Day & Co. (A)	Hull–New York City	RS
1815	G. Fowler	Kennet & Co. (A)	Liverpool–New York City	LR
1820	B. Halstead (or Alstead)	Ogden & Co.	Liverpool–New York City	LR & RS; small repairs in 1817

The registers were only as accurate as owners chose to keep them. Both Lloyd's Register and the Register of Shipping kept the data unchanged from 1820 to 1825.

However, in 1819 Paragon had already begun the first of three whaling voyages out of Nantucket, Massachusetts.

Whaling voyage #1 (1819–1821): Captain William Perkins sailed from Nantucket on 7 January 1819, bound for the Pacific. Paragon returned on 26 December 1821 with 690 barrels of sperm oil and 1000 barrels of whale oil.

Whaling voyage #2 (1822–1825): Captain Henry Bunker sailed from Nantucket on 11 June 1822, bound for the Pacific. Paragon returned on 18 January 1825 with 1858 barrels of sperm oil.

== Loss ==
Captain David N. Edwards sailed from Nantucket on 16 November 1825, bound for the Pacific on Paragon's third whaling voyage. She was at San Francisco in 1826. She foundered early in 1828 a few days after leaving Oahu. She had 2100 barrels of sperm oil on board. Rosalie, of Newport, rescued her crew.
