= British Tar (1814 ship) =

19th century British trading ship

History

United Kingdom
- Name: British Tar
- Namesake: Matthew Akenhead & Henry Simpson
- Builder: Whitby
- Launched: 1814
- Fate: Wrecked 14 August 1840

General characteristics
- Tons burthen: 266, or 267 (bm)
- Length: 92 ft 11 in (28.3 m)
- Beam: 25 ft 11 in (7.9 m)
- Depth: 17 ft 9 in (5.4 m)
- Complement: 11–13

British Tar was launched at Whitby in 1814. She became a Liverpool-based merchantman, trading across the Atlantic with North America until she was wrecked in August 1840.

== Career ==
British Tar first appeared in Lloyd's Register (LR) in 1815.

Year	Master	Owner	Trade	Source & notes
1815	T.S.Clarke	Akenhead	London–Hambro	LR
1820	J.S.Clarke	Simpson & Co.	Liverpool–Copenhagen	LR
1825	J.S.Clarke	Akenhead	Liverpool–"Mrmck"	LR
1830	D.Clarke	Akenhead	Liverpool–Philadelphia	LR
1835	Blinkhorn	Simpson	Liverpool–Newfoundland	LR; larges repairs 1835
1840	Blinkhorn	Simpson	Liverpool–Savannah	LR; larges repairs 1835

== Fate ==
British Tar, Blenkhorn, master, ran aground on the Arklow Bank, in the Irish Sea off the coast of County Wicklow, on 14 August 1840 and subsequently became a wreck. The coastguard rescued the crew, all of whom but Blenkhorn, deserted her. She was on a voyage from Saint John, New Brunswick to Liverpool with a cargo of timber. British Tar floated off on 17 August and drifted down the channel. She was later reported to have gone to pieces.

Her entry in the 1840 issue of LR bears the annotation "Wrecked".
