= Trial (1803 ship) =

Irish-built ship (1803)

History

United Kingdom
- Name: Trial
- Launched: 1803, Belfast
- Captured: 4 January 1810
- Fate: Burnt

General characteristics
- Tons burthen: 70, or 73, or 76 (bm)
- Notes: Top and sides of fir plank

Trial was launched at Belfast in 1803. Apparently for most of her career she was initially an Irish coaster. A French privateer captured and burnt her in 1810 while she was returning to Ireland from Gibraltar.

Trial first appeared in Lloyd's Register (LR) in 1804.

Year	Master	Owner	Trade	Source
1804	T.Waire	T.Hunter	Dublin coaster	LR
1808	P.Currin	Haslett & Co.	Belfast coaster	LR
1810	P.Currin	C.Sweeney	Belfast–Gibraltar	LT

The French privateer Juno captured Trial, Curran, master, at 49°26′N 8°12′W as Trial was returning to Ireland from Gibraltar. Juno burnt Trial. Juno reportedly had also taken a brig from the Brazils to London, and Swallow, of Waterford.
