= Charlotte (sloop) =

Sloop built in Sydney, Australia 1803

History

United Kingdom
- Name: Charlotte
- Owner: Robert Inch
- Launched: 1803
- Fate: Sank 27 August 1808

General characteristics
- Class & type: Sloop
- Tons burthen: 16 tons

Charlotte was a sloop that sank in 1808 off the coast of New South Wales, Australia.

== History ==
Charlotte was built in Sydney, Australia. and registered at 16 tons on 19 December 1803. Owned and skippered by Robert Inch and assisted by his hand, George Conway, the ship was 5 nautical miles (9.3 km; 5.8 mi) north of Port Jackson, Australia, bound from the Hawkesbury River with a cargo of grain on 27 August 1808 when a squall struck her after her mainsail jibbed. The sloop Hope witnessed the sinking while sailing 1 nautical mile (1.9 km; 1.2 mi) south of Charlotte. Both Inch and Conway drowned.
