= Macclesfield (1803 ship) =

UK slave and merchant ship 1803–1809

History

United Kingdom
- Name: Macclesfield
- Namesake: Macclesfield, or the Earl of Macclesfield
- Fate: Abandoned 13 February 1809

General characteristics
- Tons burthen: 304, or 306, or 326 (bm)
- Complement: 1804: 50; 1805: 50
- Armament: 1804: 20 × 9-pounder guns; 1805: 20 × 9-pounder guns; 1809: 24 × 9-pounder guns + 2 × 24-pounder carronades

Macclesfield was launched at Lancaster in 1803. She made three voyages as a slave ship in the triangular trade in enslaved people. After the end of British participation in the trans-Atlantic slave trade she became a West Indiaman. She was wrecked in 1809.

== Career ==
Macclesield first appeared in Lloyd's Register (LR) in the volume for 1804.

Year	Master	Owner	Trade	Source
1804	Belcher	Taylor	Liverpool–Africa	LR

1st slave voyage (1804–1805): Captain Elijah Belcher acquired a letter of marque on 28 March 1804. He sailed from Liverpool on 1 May. Macclesfield acquired slaves at the Congo River. She arrived at Charleston on 11 October 1804 with 298 slaves. She sailed for home on 14 December and arrived back at Liverpool 7 February 1805. She had left Liverpool with 49 crew members and she had suffered two crew deaths on her voyage.

2nd slave voyage (1805-1806): Captain George Smith acquired a letter of marque on 9 May 1805. He sailed from Liverpool on 5 June. Macclesfield gahtered slaves a tBonny and left Africa on 24 November. She arrived at Zion Hill, Tobago on 5 January 1806. She sailed from Tobago on 9 February 1806 and arrived back at Liverpool on 14 April. She had left Liverpool with 40 crew members and she had suffered five crew deaths on her voyage. She returned with 299 hogsheads and 54 tierces of sugar, 10 puncheons of rum, 10 puncheons of lime juice, and one box of tortoise shell.

3rd slave voyage (1806–1807): Captain Smith sailed from Liverpool on 4 July 1806. She gathered slaves at Bonny and delivered them to St Lucia. She left St Lucia on 30 May 1807 and arrived back at Liverpool on 15 July. She had left Liverpool with 49 crew members and had suffered six crew deaths on her voyage. She returned with sugar, bales of cotton, casks of coffee.

Macclesfield had arrived after the Slave Trade Act 1807, which ended British participation in the trans-Atlantic slave trade, took effect on 1 May 1807. She then became a West Indiaman.

Year	Master	Owner	Trade	Source
1808	G.Smith; A.Graham	Taylor & Co. Gladstones	Liverpool–Africa	LR
1809	A.Graham; Croft	Gladstones	Liverpool–Demerara	LR

== Fate ==
On 30 January 1809 Macclesfield, Croft, master, was caught in a gale that caused a great deal of damage and cost her her rudder. The crew abandoned her on 13 February at 53°9′N 11°18′W. The brig Friendship, from Greenock, brought the crew into Limerick on 16 February. Macclesfield later came ashore on Rosine Island, in Galway Bay. She went on some rocks in Ennesbuffen Harbour and was wrecked.
