= British Tar (1804 ship) =

History

United Kingdom
- Name: British Tar
- Owner: 1804:Lockyer; 1806:Pinson & Co.
- Builder: Spain, or America
- Launched: 1793
- Acquired: By purchase of a prize
- Fate: Captured and burned January 1806

General characteristics
- Tons burthen: 162, or 167, (bm)
- Armament: 2 × 4-pounder guns

British Tar was probably launched in Spain, though possibly in the United States, in 1793. She appears to have come into British hands as a prize in 1802, but she does not appear in the British registers until 1804. In January 1806 British Tar, W. White, master, Pinson & Co., owner, was on a voyage from Labrador in British North America to a Mediterranean port during the War of the Third Coalition when a French Navy squadron captured and burned her in the Mediterranean Sea.

Year	Master	Owner	Trade	Source
1804	T. Lockyear	T. Lockyear	Plymouth	Register of Shipping; thorough repair 1802
1805	White	Pinson & Co.	Dartmouth–Newfoundland	Lloyd's Register; good repair 1805
1806	W. White	Pinson & Co.	London–Newfoundland	Register of Shipping; marked "Captured"
1806	White	Pinson & Co.	Dartmouth–Newfoundland	Lloyd's Register
