= Tyne (1841 ship) =

History

United Kingdom
- Name: Tyne
- Namesake: River Tyne
- Launched: 1841, Sunderland
- Fate: Wrecked July 1845

General characteristics
- Class & type: Old Act: 347 (bm); New Act (post 1836): 427, 428, or 500 (bm)

Tyne was built in Sunderland and launched in 1841. She made two complete voyages to New Zealand, carrying immigrants for the New Zealand Company. She was wrecked in July 1845 on her third voyage.

== Career ==
Tyne first appeared in Lloyd's Register (LR), in 1841. Her homeport was Newcastle.

Year	Master	Owner	Trade	Source
1841	Robertson	Bilton & Co.	Sunderland–Calcutta	LR

She immediately began transporting migrants to New Zealand for the New Zealand Company.

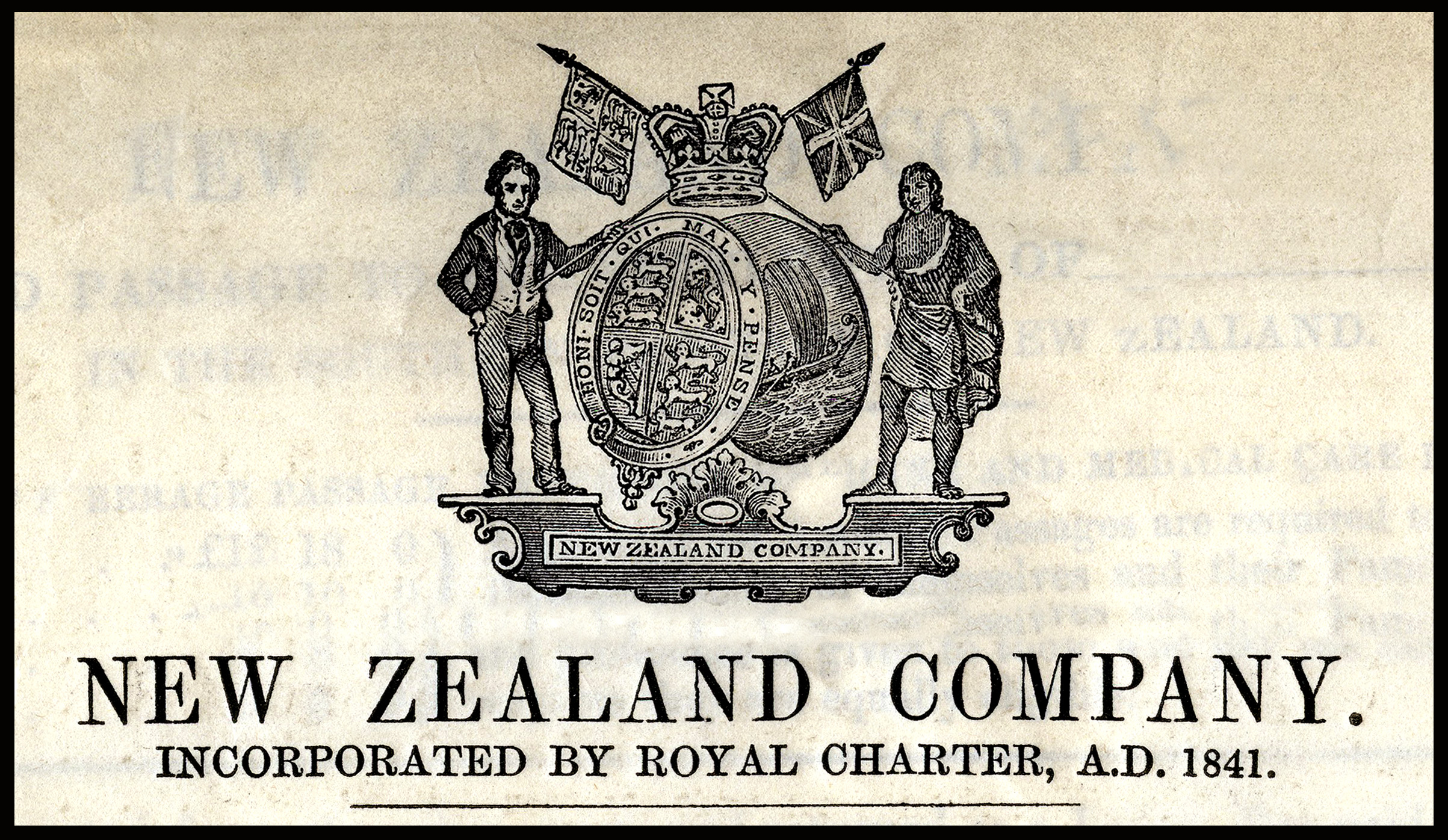
New Zealand Company Coat of Arms

Tyne, under the command of Captain Charles Robertson, arrived on 9 August 1841 at Wellington, having sailed from the Downs on 6 April 1841. She sailed for the Thames on 6 September. She then sailed on to Auckland, remaining there until the end of November before returning to Wellington. She sailed for Sydney on 12 February 1842 and arrived there on 24 February.

Year	Master	Owner	Trade	Source
1844	Robertson	Bilton & Co.	Sunderland–Calcutta; London–New Zealand	LR

On 12 February 1843, Tyne sailed again from London for Nelson, Wellington, and Auckland. She called at the Cape of Good Hope on 12 May and Hobart on 31 July. At Hobart, the Second Officer, James Stewart, fell overboard into the Derwent River and drowned. Tyne reached Port Nicholson on 11 August. She arrived at Nelson on 28 September. Tyne returned to Port Nicholson on 5 November via Kapiti. On 25 November, Tyne sailed for Port Phillip.

In 1844, Tyne was back in Port Nicholson. She sailed for London on 23 May.

== Fate ==
In early 1845, she sailed for Port Nicholson from London, reaching Stephen Island on 3 July. She proceeded into Cook Strait near Cape Terawhiti where she encountered a southerly storm. At about 5pm on 4 July, she was driven into rocks, losing the main and foremasts, and was subsequently driven ashore. On 6 July, soldiers from the 96th Regiment of Foot and the local militia arrived to assist the survivors ashore. There were no deaths.
