= Governor King (ship) =

Australian schooner

History

Australia
- Namesake: Governor Philip Gidley King
- Owner: Henry Kable & James Underwood
- Builder: Kable & Underwood
- Launched: 1803
- Fate: Wrecked on 22 April 1806

General characteristics
- Type: Schooner
- Displacement: 38 tons
- Propulsion: Sail

Governor King was a 38-ton schooner built in 1803 by James Underwood, Sydney, Australia and was wrecked in April 1806.

Governor King was launched in May 1803 by James Underwood, for Kable and Underwood.

On 20 April 1806 Governor King arrived off Port Jackson from Norfolk Island. Finding the wind direction unfavourable for entering the harbour the ship headed north to Newcastle and dropped anchor in the harbour. A strong current dragged the ship on the 22 April and it hit the rocks so violently that the stern shattered and it filled instantly, breaking up in a few hours. The crew and much of the cargo of pork being carried was saved but the ship was destroyed.
