= Tyne Packet (1803 ship) =

History

United Kingdom
- Name: Tyne Packet
- Builder: Alexander Doeg, Felling Shore, Gateshead
- Launched: 1803
- Fate: Abandoned waterlogged 26 September 1811

General characteristics
- Tons burthen: 190, or 200 (bm)
- Sail plan: Schooner
- Armament: 10 × 12-pounder carronades

Tyne Packet was launched in Newcastle-on-Tyne in 1803. She spent much of her brief career sailing between London and Dublin. Her crew had to abandon her on 26 September 1811 as she had taken on a lot of water and was in danger of sinking.

== Career ==
Tyne Packet first appeared in Lloyd's Register (LR), in 1808. She did not appear in Lloyd's List's ship arrival and departure data either until 1807–1808.

Year	Master	Owner	Trade	Source
1808	J.Barber	Captain & Co.	London–Dublin	LR

On 13 March 1808 Tyne Packet, Barber, master, lost her bowsprit in the Dublin River but sustained no other damage.

Year	Master	Owner	Trade	Source
1809	J.Barber	Captain & Co.	London–Dublin	LR
1810	J.Barber; J.Riley	Captain & Co.	London–Dublin	LR
1811	J.Riley; R.Martin	Captain & Co.	London–Dublin	LR

== Fate ==
On 26 September 1811 her crew abandoned Tyne Packet, Morton, master, off Cape Finisterre. She had been sailing from St Ubes to Dublin when she developed leaks and had 7 ft (2.1 m) of water in her hold. Gardner, Martens, master, took off the crew. Gardner had been sailing from Cork to Lisbon and put into Scilly on 6 October, having split her sails.
