= British Tar (1803 ship) =

History

United Kingdom
- Builder: Lockwood Brodrick (Late), at South Shields.
- Launched: 1803
- Fate: Last listed 1811

General characteristics
- Tons burthen: 328, or 330 (bm)

British Tar was launched at Shields in 1803. She first appeared in Lloyd's Register (LR) in 1803.

| Year | Master | Owner | Trade | Source |
|---|---|---|---|---|
| 1803 | T.Forrest | T.Forrest | London | LR |
| 1808 | T.Forrest | T.Forrest | London | LR |

British Tar may have been the transport of that name that participated in the Battle of Copenhagen (1807). She was one of several transports that the commander-in-chief had ordered to be armed and that were carrying pennants. (Note: An able seaman's share of the prize money was worth £3 8s.)

British Tar was last listed in 1811 with unchanged data.
