= Thought (1806 ship) =

History

United Kingdom
- Name: Thought
- Launched: 1803
- Acquired: c.1806
- Fate: Lost early 1807

General characteristics
- Tons burthen: 93 (bm)
- Sail plan: Brig
- Armament: 2 × 4-pounder guns

Thought was launched in Spain in 1803 and came into British hands in 1806. She first appeared in Lloyd's Register in 1806 with Simcock, master, Crowson, owner, and trade Falmouth–St Michael's. She underwent minor repairs in 1806. From St Michael's Thought sailed to the River Clyde. On 27 February 1807 Lloyd's List reported that she had become a total loss at the entrance to the river. Her entire crew drowned.
