= William Whitlock Jr. =

American shipping industry executive

William Whitlock, Jr (February 23, 1791 – July 11, 1875 in New York City) was an American shipping industry executive.

He was a son of William Whitlock, a ship owner and master, and was descended from Thomas Whitlock who came from England in 1640 and after a few years of residence in Massachusetts became one of the first settlers of Gravesend, Brooklyn in 1646. Whitlock Jr entered the shipping business in 1812 and soon created a trade. At one time he ranked among the largest individual owners of ocean tonnage in the United States.

He did not have control of as large a number of vessels as some others but owned most of his ships entirely. In 1825 he established a line of packet ships between New York and Le Havre, which flourished until the beginning of the American Civil War when the competition of steamships drove it from the sea.

Whitlock exported cotton extensively and imported East India goods, particularly hemp. He was a director of The Bank of America and had high credit in the commercial cities of the world. He retired in 1872.

In 1818 he married Miss H Scott of Catskill, New York; they had one son and four daughters. Religious and charitable work occupied much of his time. For many years he served as treasurer of St George's Church and an officer of The American Bible Society.
