= Alexander (ship) =

A number of vessels have been named Alexander:

- Alexander (1783 ship), a merchant ship built in Hull and used to transport convicts in the First Fleet to New South Wales in 1788
- Alexander (1785 ship), was launched at Bristol. As Alexander, and later renamed Prince, she served as a slave ship. She foundered in 1800.
- Alexander (1794 ship), built in France in 1791 under a different name. She was taken as a prize and her new owners renamed her Alexander. She made one voyage for the British East India Company, and then made four voyages as a slave ship between 1798 and 1807.
- Alexander (1796 ship), built in Pembroke, Massachusetts, in 1796 and made at least three voyages in the maritime fur trade.
- Alexander (1799 ship) was launched in France or Spain in 1797, probably under another name, and taken in prize circa 1799, when she was lengthened and raised. She was registered at Liverpool in 1801 and proceeded to make six voyages as a slave ship. She then sailed to Brazil and the West Indies and was last listed in 1809.
- Alexander (1801 ship Shields), a 301-ton merchant vessel launched at Shields; she became a whaler and made one voyage to New Zealand and the South Seas whale fisheries (1802–06) for Hurry & Co.
- Alexander (1803 ship Bombay), a ship of 600 or 746 tons burthen, launched in 1803 at Bombay and wrecked in 1815.
- Alexander (1803 Liverpool), a ship of 614 tons (bm), launched in 1803 at Liverpool and sold in 1817
- Alexander (1806 ship) was launched in 1801 in the United States, possibly under another name. She became a slave ship, sailing from Liverpool. A French privateer captured her in 1807 after she had landed her slaves at Berbice. Alexander returned to British ownership and became a West Indiaman, and then a transport. She was last listed in 1816 but may have been sold or broken up in 1815.
- Alexander (1807 ship) was launched in 1800 at Hull, or actually further up the River Ouse at Selby, and probably under another name. From 1807 on she was a West Indiaman. She was wrecked on 19 May 1820 while sailing to Honduras.
- HMS Comet (1807), was launched as a Thais-class fireship of the Royal Navy. In 1808 the class were re-rated as sloops, and in 1811 they were re-rated as 20-gun sixth rates. Comet participated in one action that resulted in her crew being awarded the Naval General Service Medal, and some other actions and captures. The Navy sold her in 1815. In 1816 she became the East Indiaman Alexander, sailing under a license from the British East India Company (EIC). She sailed between the United Kingdom and Ceylon. It was on one of these journeys that she was wrecked on Cole House Point on the River Thames on 9 August 1828.
- Alexander (1811 ship), a merchant ship built in the United States in 1811, captured as a prize during the War of 1812; she transported convicts to Port Jackson in 1816
- Alexander (1812 ship), was a country ship (i.e., she traded east of the Cape of Good Hope) launched in 1812. She was lost in 1835.
- Alexander, of 660 tons (bm), was launched at Chittagong in 1812 and renamed Chichester. She was lost in 1814 on the Mizen Sand, Bengal.
- Alexander (1813 ship) was built in Aberdeen in 1813 or 1815. She started as a Plymouth-based transport. In 1817 the British Admiralty hired her as one of two vessels that would go on an expedition to search for a Northwest Passage. The expedition was unsuccessful. After her return in 1818, Alexander traded between Britain and North America. The last mention of Aberdeen in online sources was in 1830.
- Alexander (1813 Halifax ship), of 229 tons (bm), launched at Halifax, Nova Scotia, for Walkinshaw & Co.
- Alexander (1828 ship), of 52330/94 tons (bm), launched in 1828 by John Blackett, Millwall Dock, Poplar, London, for his own account.
- Alexander (yacht), originally built as a cruise ship and later converted into a superyacht.

== See also ==
- HMS Alexander
- Alexander (East Indiaman)
- French ship Alexandre
