= Alexander (East Indiaman) =

A number of ships with the name Alexander served the British East India Company (EIC) as East Indiamen:

- Alexander (1783 ship), a ship of 445 tons (bm), launched in 1783 at Hull, that made one voyage for the EIC as an extra ship, i.e., under contract carrying convicts to Botany Bay in 1788, as part of the First Fleet, and returning with a cargo from Canton. She is last listed in Lloyd's Register in 1808.
- Alexander (1794) was built in France in 1791 under a different name. She was taken as a prize and her new owners renamed her Alexander. She made one voyage for the British East India Company (EIC), and then became a slave ship, making several voyages between 1798 and 1807. She is last listed in 1809.
- Alexander (1801 ship), a ship of 281 tons (bm) launched at Quebec that made one voyage for the EIC between 1802 and 1803, and that was placed in the West Indies trade in 1804.
- Alexander (1803 Liverpool), a ship of 614 tons (bm), launched in 1803 at Liverpool and sold in 1817.

== See also ==
- HMS Alexander
- Alexander (ship)
