= List of shipwrecks in November 1821 =

The list of shipwrecks in November 1821 includes ships sunk, foundered, grounded, or otherwise lost during November 1821.

== 1 November ==
List of shipwrecks: 1 November 1821
Ship	State	Description
Julien Vigilant	France	The ship was wrecked on the Goodwin Sands, Kent, United Kingdom. Her crew survived. She was on a voyage from Rouen, Seine-Inférieure to Stockton-on-Tees, Yorkshire, United Kingdom.
Maria Catherina	Duchy of Holstein	The ship foundered off Flekkerøy, Norway. She was on a voyage from Flensburg to Bergen, Norway.
Mary	United Kingdom	The brig was abandoned in the Atlantic Ocean (47°51′N 35°21′W) with the loss of three of her ten crew. Survivors were rescued by Union (United Kingdom).
Walk-in-the-Water	United States	The paddle steamer was driven ashore and wrecked in Lake Erie near Buffalo, New York. All on board survived.

== 2 November ==
List of shipwrecks: 2 November 1821
Ship	State	Description
Herman	Hamburg	The ship was driven ashore and wrecked on the south coast of the Isle of Wight, United Kingdom. Her crew were rescued. She was on a voyage from Bordeaux, Gironde, France to Hamburg.
Regent	United Kingdom	The ship was driven ashore at Herne Bay, Kent. She was later refloated. Regent was on a voyage from Málaga, Spain to London.
Vijf Gebroeders	Netherlands	The ship was lost off the mouth of the Ems. She was on a voyage from Bremen to Amsterdam, North Holland.

== 3 November ==
List of shipwrecks: 3 November 1821
Ship	State	Description
Adventure	United Kingdom	The ship was driven ashore and wrecked on the coast of Lincolnshire. She was on a voyage from Whitby, Yorkshire to Wisbech, Cambridgeshire.
Alexander	United Kingdom	The ship was driven ashore in Bootle Bay. She was on a voyage from Demerara to Liverpool, Lancashire. She was gotten off by 8 November.
Cambria	United Kingdom	The ship was driven ashore at Mockbeggar, Cheshire. She was on a voyage from Pwllheli, Caernarvonshire to Liverpool.
Dowson	United Kingdom	The ship ran aground on the Hoyle Bank, in Liverpool Bay. She was on a voyage from Miramichi Bay to Liverpool. Dowson was refloated on 9 November and taken in to Liverpool.
Fame	United Kingdom	The ship was wrecked at Leith, Lothian. She was on a voyage from Saint Petersburg, Russia to Grangemouth, Stirlingshire.
Hesperus	United Kingdom	The ship was driven ashore near Garston, Lancashire. She was on a voyage from New York, United States to Liverpool. Hesperus was refloated on 6 November and taken in to Liverpool.
Isabella	United Kingdom	The ship was driven ashore at Liverpool. She was on a voyage from Dublin to Liverpool. Isabella was refloated on 6 November and taken in to Liverpool.
John	United Kingdom	The ship ran aground on the Pluckington Bank, in Liverpool Bay. She was on a voyage from Liverpool to Philadelphia, Pennsylvania, United States. John was refloated on 5 November and taken in to Liverpool.
Jonge Martha	Netherlands	The ship was driven ashore and wrecked between Fairlight and Rye, Sussex, United Kingdom with the loss of ten of the eleven people on board. She was on a voyage from Boulogne, Pas-de-Calais to Bordeaux, Gironde, France
Mary	United Kingdom	The brigantine was run down and sunk off Lamlash, Isle of Arran. Her crew survived.
Mary & Eliza	United Kingdom	The ship was wrecked on the Black Middens, in the North Sea off the coast of County Durham Her crew were rescued by the South Shields Lifeboat. She was on a voyage from Porto, Portugal to Newcastle upon Tyne, Northumberland.
Neptune	United Kingdom	The ship departed from South Shields, County Durham for London. No further trace, presumed foundered with the loss of all hands.
Pallas	United Kingdom	The ship was driven ashore near Garston. She was on a voyage from Sicily to Liverpool.
Platow	Prussia	The ship was lost between Gothenburg and Marstrand, Sweden. She was on a voyage from Kiel to Grangemouth, Stirlingshire, United Kingdom.
Waterloo	United Kingdom	The steamship was driven ashore at Hoylake, Lancashire. She was on a voyage from Dublin to Liverpool.

== 4 November ==
List of shipwrecks: 4 November 1821
Ship	State	Description
Alfred	United Kingdom	The brig was driven ashore and wrecked near Wells-next-the-Sea, Norfolk. Her crew were rescued.
Alfred	Hamburg	The ship was driven ashore in the Elbe upstream of Cuxhaven. She was on a voyage from Rio de Janeiro, Brazil to Hamburg. Alfred was later refloated and taken in to Hamburg.
Aim	United Kingdom	The sloop was driven ashore at Ballantrae, Ayrshire. She was on a voyage from Málaga, Spain to the Clyde. Aim was later refloated and taken in to Loch Ryan.
Anea	United Kingdom	The sloop was wrecked in Tramore Bay. Her crew survived. She was on a voyage from Loch Indaal to Limerick.
Ann	United Kingdom	The sloop ran aground on the Brest Rocks, off Girvan, Ayrshire and was wrecked. Her crew survived.
Ann	United Kingdom	The ship was driven ashore and wrecked at Wells-next-the-Sea with the loss of a crew member. She was on a voyage from London to Hull, Yorkshire.
Ann	United Kingdom	The ship was driven ashore near the mouth of the River Tees.
Ann and Jane	United Kingdom	The ship was driven ashore at Great Yarmouth. She was on a voyage from Selby, Yorkshire to Great Yarmouth. Ann and Jane was later refloated and sailed to the Humber for repairs.
Anne and Jane	United Kingdom	The ship was driven ashore at Great Yarmouth. Her crew were rescued. She was on a voyage from Colchester, Essex to Leeds, Yorkshire.
Atalanta	United Kingdom	The ship was lost whilst on a voyage from Saint Petersburg. Russia to London. Her crew were rescued.
Aurora	Netherlands	The ship was destroyed by fire in the English Channel off Dungeness, Kent. United Kingdom. Her crew were rescued by Iris (United Kingdom). She was on a voyage from Rotterdam, South Holland to Liverpool, Lancashire, United Kingdom.
Bacchus	United Kingdom	The ship was driven ashore at Scarborough, Yorkshire. She was refloated on 8 November.
Benfaisainte	France	The ship was driven ashore at Dunkirk, Nord.
Betsey	United Kingdom	The ship was driven ashore south of Sunderland, County Durham. Her crew were rescued. She was later refloated.
Betsey & Kitty	United Kingdom	The ship was driven ashore near Great Yarmouth. She was on a voyage from Perth to Chichester, Sussex.
Breakwater	United Kingdom	The sloop was driven ashore at Groomsport, County Down. She was on a voyage from Ayr to Belfast, County Antrim Breakwater was later refloated and taklen in to Belfast.
Brothers	United Kingdom	The ship was driven ashore and wrecked south of Sunderland. Her crew were rescued.
Bucephalus	United Kingdom	The ship was driven ashore at Scarborough. Her crew were rescued by the Scarborough Lifeboat. Bucephalus was refloated on 8 November and taken in to Scarborough.
Bucephalus	United Kingdom	The ship was driven ashore near the mouth of the Tees.
Caledonia	United Kingdom	The ship was driven ashore at Scarborough. She was refloated on 10 November and taken in to Scarborough.
Catherine	United Kingdom	The brig struck rocks off Coquet Island Northumberland and foundered with the loss of all sixteen crew.
Collingwood	United Kingdom	The schooner foundered in the North Sea 2 nautical miles (3.7 km) south of Scarborough with the loss of all hands.
Collingwood	United Kingdom	The ship was driven ashore near the mouth of the Tees.
Cossack	United Kingdom	The ship was driven ashore near Hartlepool, County Durham. She was on a voyage from Riga, Russia to Newcastle upon Tyne. Cossack was later refloated.
Dart	United Kingdom	The ship was driven ashore and wrecked at Morston, Norfolk. Her crew were rescued.
Diana	Sweden	The ship was driven ashore at Helsingør, Denmark. She was on a voyage from Stockholm to Lisbon, Portugal.
Dido	United Kingdom	The ship was driven ashore at Easington, County Durham. She was later refloated.
Dover Excursion	United Kingdom	The ship was driven ashore and wrecked at Sunderland.
Duncombe	United Kingdom	The ship was driven ashore at Whitstable, Kent. She was on a voyage from Quebecn British North America to London. Duncombe was refloated on 8 November.
Dunn	United Kingdom	The ship was driven ashore near the mouth of the River Tees.
Eagle	United Kingdom	The ship was driven ashore and severely damaged at Scarborough. Her crew were rescued by the Scarborough Lifeboat. Eagle was refloated on 10 November and taken in to Scarborough.
Economy	United Kingdom	The ship was driven ashore at Lowestoft.
Edgar	United Kingdom	The ship was driven ashore near the mouth of the River Tees.
Edward	United Kingdom	The ship was driven ashore at Hartlepool. She was later refloated.
Eliza	United Kingdom	The ship was driven ashore on Rutland Island, County Donegal. She was on a voyage from Liverpool, Lancashire to Limerick.
Eliza	United Kingdom	The ship was driven ashore and wrecked at Great Yarmouth, Norfolk. Her crew were rescued. She was on a voyage from Newcastle upon Tyne to Great Yarmouth.
Elizabeth	United Kingdom	The ship was presumed to have foundered in the North Sea off South Shields.
Endeavour	United Kingdom	The ship foundered in The Wash off King's Lynn, Norfolk. Her crew were rescued by Staines (United Kingdom).
Endeavour	United Kingdom	The sloop was driven ashore and wrecked at Stallingborough, Lincolnshire with the loss of seven of the eight people on board.
Experiment	United Kingdom	The sloop was driven ashore south of Sunderland.
Fame	United Kingdom	The ship was driven ashore near Leith, Lothian. She was on a voyage from Saint Petersburg, Russia to Grangemouth, Stirlingshire.
Flora	United Kingdom	The ship was driven ashore at Hartlepool. She was later refloated.
Flora	United Kingdom	The ship was driven ashore at Scremerston or Berwick-upon-Tweed, Northumberland, She was on a voyage from Dunbeath or Wick, Caithness to London.
Fornax	United Kingdom	The ship was abandoned in the North Sea off Lowestoft. Her crew were rescued by Adamant (United Kingdom).
Fortitude	United Kingdom	The ship was driven ashore at Great Yarmouth. Her crew were rescued. She was on a voyage from Cardiff, Glamorgan to Sunderland.
Friends	United Kingdom	The ship was presumed to have foundered in the North Sea off South Shields.
Friends	United Kingdom	The ship was driven ashore near the mouth of the Tees.
Friendship	United Kingdom	The ship was driven ashore and wrecked at Lingberry, Yorkshire with the loss of two lives. She was on a voyage from Riga, Russia to Portsmouth, Hampshire.
George	United Kingdom	The ship was driven ashore and wrecked at Great Yarmouth. Her crew were rescued. She was on a voyage from Sunderland to London.
Gleaner	United Kingdom	The ship was driven ashore near the mouth of the River Tees.
Hawk	United Kingdom	The ship was driven ashore at Hemsby, Norfolk. Her crew were rescued. She was on a voyage from London to Leeds, Yorkshire.
Hebe	United Kingdom	The sloop ran aground and was wrecked on the Brest Rocks, Girvan. Her crew survived.
Hetty and Kitty	United Kingdom	The ship was driven ashore at Great Yarmouth. She was on a voyage from Perth to Chichester, Sussex.
Hope	United Kingdom	The sloop foundered in the North Sea off Scarborough with the loss of all hands.
Hope	United Kingdom	The ship was driven ashore near the mouth of the Tees.
Hopewell	United Kingdom	The ship was driven ashore and wrecked at Lowestoft, Suffolk.
Houth	United Kingdom	The ship was driven ashore on Rutland Island.
Hudson	United Kingdom	The ship was driven ashore at Scarborough. She was refloated on 10 November and taken in to Scarborough.
Industry	United Kingdom	The ship was driven ashore at Sligo with the loss of all but three of her crew. She was on a voyage from Liverpool to Limerick.
Isabella	United Kingdom	The ship ran aground on the Herd Sand, in the North Sea off South Shields. She was later refloated and taken in to South Shields.
Jane	United Kingdom	The sloop was driven ashore and wrecked at Peak, Yorkshire with the loss of all hands.
Johanna Maria Constantia	Netherlands	The ship ran aground off Texel, North Holland. She was on a voyage from Surinam to Amsterdam, North Holland.
John	United Kingdom	The ship was driven ashore near the mouth of the Tees. She was later refloated.
Juno	United Kingdom	The ship sank at Lowestoft with the loss of a crew member. She was on a voyage from London to Leeds.
Lady Ana Murray	United Kingdom	The ship was driven ashore and wrecked near Dunbar, Lothian. She was on a voyage from Whitehaven, Cumberland to Newcastle upon Tyne.
Lark	United Kingdom	The ship was driven ashore and wrecked at Wells-next-the-Sea with the loss of all hands.
Lincoln	United Kingdom	The ship foundered in the North Sea off Cromer, Norfolk. Her crew were rescued by Sally (United Kingdom).
Lord Duncan	United Kingdom	The ship was driven ashore at Hartlepool. She was later refloated.
Lord Nelson	United Kingdom	The ship was driven ashore at Lowestoft. She was later refloated.
Lord Wellington	United Kingdom	The ship foundered in The Wash off Boston, Lincolnshire. Her crew were rescued.
Maria	United Kingdom	The ship was driven ashore at Lowestoft. Her crew were rescued. She was on a voyage from Boston, Lincolnshire to London. Maria was refloated on 19 November and taken in to Great Yarmouth, Norfolk.
Mary	United Kingdom	The ship was driven ashore near the mouth of the River Tees. She was later refloated.
Mary	United Kingdom	The ship foundered in the North Sea off Redcar, Yorkshire with the loss of all hands.
Mary and Eliza	United Kingdom	The ship was wrecked on the Black Middings, in the North Sea off North Shields, County Durham. Her crew were rescued by the South Shields Lifeboat.
Mary-Ann	United Kingdom	The ship was driven ashore south of Sunderland. Her crew were rescued. She was later refloated.
Matilda	United Kingdom	The ship was wrecked off Great Yarmouth. Her five crew were rescued by rocket apparatus. She was on a voyage from Newcastle upon Tyne to Great Yarmouth.
Moldegandsprove	Netherlands	The ship was driven ashore and wrecked on Vlieland, Friesland. Her crew were rescued. She was on a voyage from Amsterdam, North Holland to Trondheim, Norway.
Nancy	United Kingdom	The brig capsized and foundered in the North Sea 2 nautical miles (3.7 km) south east of Bridlington, Yorkshire with the loss of all ten crew.
Paragon	United Kingdom	The ship ran aground on the Herd Sand, in the North Sea off South Shields. She was later refloated and taken in to South Shields.
Parthian	United Kingdom	The ship was driven ashore at Cresswell, Northumberland. she was on a voyage from Saint Petersburg to Newcastle upon Tyne.
Perseverance	United Kingdom	The ship was wrecked near Eyemouth, Berwickshire with the loss of all but one of her crew. She was on a voyage from Banff, Aberdeenshire to London.
Phœbe	United Kingdom	The ship was driven ashore on Rutland Island.
Providence	United Kingdom	The ship was driven ashore and severely damaged at Scarborough. She was refloated on 10 November.
Providence	United Kingdom	The ship was driven ashore near the mouth of the Tees.
Robert and Margaret	United Kingdom	The ship was driven ashore at Scarborough.
Roseberry	United Kingdom	The ship ran aground on the Mask Sand, in the North Sea off the mouth of the Tees. Her crew were rescued.
Sally	United Kingdom	The ship was driven ashore and severely damaged at Hoylake. She was on a voyage from Dublin to Liverpool. Sally was later refloated and taken in to Liverpool.
Sceptre	United Kingdom	The ship was driven ashore near the mouth of the River Tees. She was later refloated.
Speculation	Netherlands	The ship driven ashore on Texel, North Holland. She was on a voyage from Surinam to Amsterdam. Speculation was later refloated and taken in the Nieuw Diep.
Sprightly	United Kingdom	The ship was driven ashore and wrecked at Corton, Suffolk with the loss of one of her five crew. The survivors were rescued by rocket apparatus. She was on a voyage from Banff, Aberdeenshire to London.
Stag	United Kingdom	The ship was driven ashore and severely damaged at Hartlepool. She was on a voyage from London to Banff. Stag was later refloated.
Star	United Kingdom	The ship was wrecked on the Heap Sand, in the North Sea off Ramsgate, Kent. Her crew were rescued.
Success	United Kingdom	The ship was driven ashore at Mundesley, Norfolk. Her crew were rescued. She was on a voyage from London to Boston, Lincolnshire.
Superior	United Kingdom	The sloop was driven ashore near Wells-next-the-Sea.
Sussex	United Kingdom	The ship was wrecked in Tramore Bay. Her crew survived. She was on a voyage from Miramichi Bay to Port Glasgow, Renfrewshire.
Syren	United Kingdom	The ship was wrecked on the Herd Sand, in the North Sea off Hartlepool.
Thomas and Jane	United Kingdom	The sloop was driven ashore at Mundesley with the loss of all four of her crew. She was on a voyage from Berwick-upon-Tweed to London.
Thomasine	United Kingdom	The ship was driven ashore near Hartlepool. She was later refloated.
Two Brothers	United Kingdom	The ship was driven ashore at Winterton-on-Sea, Norfolk. Her crew were rescued. She was on a voyage from London to Hull, Yorkshire.
Two Brothers	United Kingdom	The ship was driven ashore near the mouth of the River Tees.
Unity	United Kingdom	The ship was driven ashore at Lowestoft. She was on a voyage from Alloa, Clackmannanshire to London.
Venice	United Kingdom	The ship was driven ashore at Winterton-on-Sea. She was on a voyage from London to Boston, Lincolnshire.
Venus	United Kingdom	The ship struck a sandbank in the River Thames and sank, but was later refloated. She was on a voyage from London to Leeds.
Vesta	United Kingdom	The ship was driven ashore near Hartlepool. She was later refloated.
Victory	United Kingdom	The ship was driven ashore and wrecked at Cresswell. Her crew were rescued.
Viewly Hill	United Kingdom	The ship was driven ashore and wrecked at Withernsea, Yorkshire. She was on a voyage from Sunderland to London.
Violet	United Kingdom	The ship was driven ashore at Mundesley. Her crew were rescued. She was on a voyage from London to Boston, Lincolnshire.
Wellington	United Kingdom	The ship was driven ashore and wrecked on Rutland Island.
William	United Kingdom	The ship was driven ashore at Hornsea, Yorkshire. Her crew were rescued. She was on a voyage from Sunderland to Wisbech, Cambridgeshire.
William	United Kingdom	The ship was driven ashore near the mouth of the River Tees.

== 5 November ==
List of shipwrecks: 5 November 1821
Ship	State	Description
Aim	United Kingdom	The ship ran aground and was wrecked north of Ballantrae, Ayrshire. She was on a voyage from Málaga, Spain to the Clyde.
Angelina	Norway	The ship foundered off the coast of Jutland. Her crew were rescued. She was on a voyage from Arendal to the Ems.
Ark	United Kingdom	The ship foundered in the North Sea off Vlissingen, Zeeland, Netherlands with the loss of all but two of her crew. She was on a voyage from Hull to London.
Delight	United Kingdom	The ship was wrecked in Thurso Bay. Her crew were rescued. She was on a voyage from Helmsdale, Sutherland to Liverpool, Lancashire.
Eliza	United Kingdom	The ship ran aground on the South Ham, in the North Sea.
Flora	Netherlands	The ship was lost near Scheveningen, South Holland. She was on a voyage from Dordrecht, South Holland to Brest, Finistère, France.
Fortitude	United Kingdom	The ship ran aground on the South Ham, in the North Sea. She was refloated on 28 November and taken in to Great Yarmouth.
George	United Kingdom	The ship ran aground on the South Ham. She was refloated on 28 November and taken in to Great Yarmouth.
Hopewell	United Kingdom	The ship was driven ashore and wrecked near Lowestoft, Suffolk.
Jonge Messina	Netherlands	The ship foundered in the North Sea off Scheveningen, South Holland with the loss of all hands. She was on a voyage from London to Amsterdam, North Holland.
Joseph and Mary	United Kingdom	The ship was wrecked at Sandhale, Lincolnshire with the loss of six of her crew. She was on a voyage from Newcastle upon Tyne, Northumberland to London.
Lord Nelson	United Kingdom	The ship was driven ashore at Lowestoft. She was later refloated.
Maria	United Kingdom	The ship was driven ashore at Lowestoft.
Mary	United Kingdom	The brig fpondered in the North Sea off Redcar, Yorkshire.
Matilda	United Kingdom	The ship was wrecked on the South Ham, in the North Sea.
Myrtle	United Kingdom	The ship was run down and sunk in the North Sea off Great Yarmouth, Norfolk by Duncomb (United Kingdom) with the loss of her captain.
Nancy	United Kingdom	The ship was wrecked at Bridlington, Yorkshire with the loss of all hands.
North America	United States	The ship was driven ashore on Texel, North Holland. She was on a voyage from Amsterdam to Baltimore, Maryland. North America was later refloated and taken in to the Nieuw Diep.
Perseverance	United Kingdom	The smack struck the Fort Rock, in the North Sea off Eyemouth, Berwickshire and was wrecked with the loss of five of her six crew. She was on a voyage from Aberdeen to London.
Pilgrim	United Kingdom	The ship was driven ashore on Texel. She was on a voyage from Amsterdam to Greenock, Renfrewshire.
Samuel	United Kingdom	The ship ran aground on rocks near Rutland Island, County Donegal. She was on a voyage from Bangor, Caernarvonshire to Galway.
Savannah	United States	The full-rigged ship was wrecked on Long Island. She was on a voyage from Savannah, Georgia to New York.
Sprightly	United Kingdom	The ship was driven ashore at Corton, Suffolk.
Susan	United Kingdom	The ship was driven ashore on Schiermonnikoog, Friesland, Netherlands. She was on a voyage from Saint Petersburg, Russia to Truro, Cornwall.
Swift	United Kingdom	The ship ran aground and was wrecked on Öland, Sweden. She was on a voyage from Stockholm, Sweden to Hull.
Two Brothers	United Kingdom	The ship was driven ashore at Winterton-on-Sea, Norfolk. She was on a voyage from London to Hull.
Venice	United Kingdom	The ship was driven ashore at Winterton-on-Sea. She was on a voyage from London to Boston, Lincolnshire.
Viewey	United Kingdom	The ship was driven ashore at Withernsea, Yorkshire. She was on a voyage from Sunderland, County Durham to London
William	United Kingdom	The ship was driven ashore at Hornsea, Yorkshire.
William and Ann	United Kingdom	The ship was wrecked at Sandhale with the loss of two of her crew.

== 6 November ==
List of shipwrecks: 6 November 1821
Ship	State	Description
Apollo	United Kingdom	The ship was driven ashore on Baltrum, Kingdom of Hanover. Her crew were rescued. She was on a voyage from Saint Petersburg, Russia to Bideford, Devon.
Commerce	Norway	The ship was driven ashore crewless on Texel, North Holland, Netherlands. She was on a voyage from Arendal to Brest, Finistère, France.
Faseta	Hamburg	The ship was driven ashore on Heligoland. She was on a voyage from Bahia, Brazil to Hamburg.
Hawk	United Kingdom	The ship was driven ashore at Hemsby, Norfolk. Her crew were rescued. She was on a voyage from London to Leeds, Yorkshire.
Samuel	United Kingdom	The ship struck a rock off Rutland Island, County Donegal and was wrecked. She was on a voyage from Bangor, Caernarvonshire to Galway.
Two Brothers	United Kingdom	The ship was driven ashore at Winterton-on-Sea, Norfolk. Her crew were rescued. She was on a voyage from London to Hull, Yorkshire.

== 7 November ==
List of shipwrecks: 7 November 1821
Ship	State	Description
Betty and Mary	United Kingdom	The ship departed from Workington, Cumberland for the Isle of Man. No further trace, presumed foundered in the Irish Sea with the loss of all hands.
Briton	United Kingdom	The ship was driven ashore in the River Thames at Cuckold's Point, Middlesex. She was on a voyage from London to Gibraltar. Briton was later refloated.
Iris	United Kingdom	The ship was driven ashore at Littlehampton, Sussex. She was refloated on 10 November and taken in to Littlehampton.
John	United Kingdom	The collier was driven ashore at Brighton, Sussex. She was later refloated and taken in to Shoreham-by-Sea, Sussex.
Pack	Sweden	The brig was wrecked at Berck, Pas-de-Calais, France. Her crew were rescued. she was on a voyage from Lisbon, Portugal to Stockholm.
William and Mary	United Kingdom	The collier, a brig, capsized at Shoreham-by-Sea.

== 8 November ==
List of shipwrecks: 8 November 1821
Ship	State	Description
Agincourt	United Kingdom	The ship was abandoned in the Atlantic Ocean (49°17′N 17°00′W). Her eighteen crew were rescued by Juno and St. Vincent (both United Kingdom). She was on a voyage from Quebec, British North America to London.
Fanny	(United Kingdom of Great Britain and Ireland) Isle of Man	The ship foundered in the Irish Sea. Her crew survived. She was on a voyage from Whitehaven, Cumberland to Peel, Isle of Man.
Hopewell	United Kingdom	The ship was run down and sunk by Nimrod (United Kingdom) in the North Sea off Blakeney, Norfolk with the loss of a crew member. She was on a voyage from Leeds, Yorkshire to London.
Indien	France	The ship was wrecked on the Kentish Knock, in the North Sea off Margate, Kent, United Kingdom Her crew were rescued. She was on a voyage from Dunkirk, Nord to London, United Kingdom.
Packet	United States	The ship was wrecked on Cape Romain, South Carolina. She was on a voyage from Cádiz, Spain to Havana, Cuba.
Star	United Kingdom	The ship was wrecked in the Studdall Roads. She was on a voyage from Liverpool, Lancashire to Waterford.
Thomson	United Kingdom	The ship was driven ashore at South Shields, County Durham. She was later refloated.
Twe Broders	Sweden	The ship was driven ashore on Gotland. She was on a voyage from Gothenburg to Västerås.

== 9 November ==
List of shipwrecks: 9 November 1821
Ship	State	Description
Britannia	United Kingdom	The ship was sighted off Havana, Cuba bound for Liverpool, Lancashire. No further trace, presumed foundered with the loss of all hands.
Concordia	Netherlands	The ship struck a sunken wreck and was abandoned by her crew. She was on a voyage from Riga, Russia to Amsterdam, North Holland.
Maxwell	United Kingdom	The ship was driven ashore and damaged at Tynemouth, Northumberland. She was on a voyage from Great Yarmouth, Norfolk to South Shields, County Durham. Maxwell was later refloated and taken in to Tynemouth.
Waterloo	United Kingdom	The schooner foundered in the Atlantic Ocean off St. Agnes, Cornwall. Her crew were rescued by Providence (United Kingdom). Waterloo was on a voyage from Neath, Glamorgan to Hayle, Cornwall.

== 10 November ==
List of shipwrecks: 10 November 1821
Ship	State	Description
Blenheim	United Kingdom	The ship departed from Annotto Bay, Jamaica for London. No further trace, presumed foundered with the loss of all hands.
Britannia	United Kingdom	The ship was driven ashore and wrecked at Ballyteague, County Wexford. She was on a voyage from Porto, Portugal to Liverpool, Lancashire.
Grace	United Kingdom	The ship was lost off the Black Rock. Her crew were rescued. She was on a voyage from Bangor, County Down to Liverpool.
Hope	United Kingdom	The ship departed from Leith, Lothian for Rotterdam, South Holland, Netherlands. No further trace, presumed foundered in the North Sea with the loss of all hands.
William	United Kingdom	The ship departed from Aberdeen for New York, United States. No further trace, presumed foundered with the loss of all hands.

== 12 November ==
List of shipwrecks: 12 November 1821
Ship	State	Description
Samuel	United Kingdom	The brig was wrecked on Rutland Island, County Donegal.

== 13 November ==
List of shipwrecks: 13 November 1821
Ship	State	Description
Commerce	Norway	The ship was driven ashore on Texel, North Holland, United Kingdom of the Netherlands. She was on a voyage from Arendal to Brest, Finistère, France.
Frederick VI	Denmark	The ship was driven ashore and wrecked at Petten, North Holland, Netherlands. Her crew were rescued.

== 14 November ==
List of shipwrecks: 14 November 1821
Ship	State	Description
Alexander	United Kingdom	The ship was driven ashore on Rutland Island, County Donegal.
Laura and Mary	United Kingdom	The sloop foundered in the Irish Sea 15 nautical miles (28 km) off Great Orme Head, Carnarvonshire. Her crew survived.
Martha	United Kingdom	The ship was lost in Lough Swilly. Her crew were rescued. She was on a voyage from Workington, Cumberland to Limerick.

== 15 November ==
List of shipwrecks: 15 November 1821
Ship	State	Description
Carolina Wilhelmina	Stettin	The ship was wrecked of a reef off "Frederickshamn". She was on a voyage from London, United Kingdom to Stettin.
William and Ann	United Kingdom	The sloop was wrecked on Pabey Island, in Broadford Bay. Her crew were rescued. She was on a voyage from Inverness to Liverpool, Lancashire.

== 16 November ==
List of shipwrecks: 16 November 1821
Ship	State	Description
Ann	United Kingdom	The ship was wrecked on Raasay, Skye. Her crew were rescued. She was on a voyage from Saint Petersburg, Russia to Bristol, Gloucestershire.
Argo	United Kingdom	The ship ran aground at Miramichi, New Brunswick, British North America. She was on a voyage from Miramichi to the Clyde.
Boddingtons	United Kingdom	The ship was in ballast when she caught fire at St. Catherine's Stairs, Wapping. Her crew scuttled her and afterwards her main and mizzen masts were cut away.
Bonne Marie	France	The ship was driven ashore on Thorney Island, Hampshire, United Kingdom. She was on a voyage from Bordeaux, Gironde to Havre de Grâce, Seine-Inférieure.
Flora	Netherlands	The full-rigged ship was driven ashore and wrecked on Robben Island, Cape Colony. She was on a voyage from Batavia, Netherlands East Indies to Amsterdam, north Holland.
Hoffnung	Hamburg	The ship was wrecked on the Goodwin Sands, Kent, United Kingdom with the loss of eighteen of the nineteen people on board. She was on a voyage from Hamburg to St. Thomas, Virgin Islands. The survivor was rescued on 18 November by Concordia (Sweden).
Isabella	United Kingdom	The ship was wrecked at Whitehills, Aberdeenshire.

== 17 November ==
List of shipwrecks: 17 November 1821
Ship	State	Description
Adventure	United Kingdom	The ship struck the Corton Sand, in the North Sea off the coast of Suffolk and sank. She was on a voyage from South Shields, County Durham to London.
Britannia	United Kingdom	The brig was wrecked on the Hogsty Reef. Her crew were rescued. She was on a voyage from Jamaica to a Scottish port.
Shamrock	United Kingdom	The ship was wrecked at Kinsale, County Cork. She was on a voyage from Kinsale to Limerick.
Sovereign	United Kingdom	The ship was wrecked on the Hogsty Reef. Her crew were rescued. She was on a voyage from Jamaica to London.

== 18 November ==
List of shipwrecks: 18 November 1821
Ship	State	Description
Earl of Dalhousie	United Kingdom	The ship was driven ashore at Shippagan, New Brunswick, British North America. She was on a voyage from Miramichi, New Brunswick to Dublin.
Sarah	United Kingdom	The ship was driven onto the Fairness Rock, off Margate, Kent. She was on a voyage from Dénia, Spain to London.

== 19 November ==
List of shipwrecks: 19 November 1821
Ship	State	Description
Friendship	United Kingdom	The ship was driven ashore and wrecked at Whitehaven, Cumberland Her crew were rescued, She was on a voyage from Dublin to Whitehaven.
Jean	United Kingdom	The ship struck a rock and foundered in the Irish Sea off the coast of County Down. Her crew were rescued by Princess Royal (United Kingdom.
Mary and Ann	United Kingdom	The ship was driven ashore on Götaland, Sweden. She was on a voyage from Saint Petersburg, Russia to the Clyde.
Orezembo	Netherlands	The ship was abandoned in the Atlantic Ocean (44°29′N 13°20′W). All on board were rescued by Edward (France). Orezembo was on a voyage from Antwerp to St. Thomas, Virgin Islands.

== 20 November ==
List of shipwrecks: 20 November 1821
Ship	State	Description
Diana	United Kingdom	The ship departed from Saint John, New Brunswick, British North America for a British port. No further trace, presumed foundered with the loss of all hands.

== 21 November ==
List of shipwrecks: 21 November 1821
Ship	State	Description
Favorite	United Kingdom	The ship was lost at Lanzarote, Canary Islands. She was on a voyage from Tenerife, Canary Islands to London.
Hope	United Kingdom	The ship was driven ashore and damaged at Rattray Head, Aberdeenshire. She was later refloated and taken in to Peterhead, Aberdeenshire.
Marianne	United Kingdom	The brig was wrecked on the Nash Sands, in the Bristol Channel. Her crew were rescued by HMRC Harpy ( Board of Customs). Marianne was on a voyage from Cardiff, Glamorgan to London.
Oak	United Kingdom	The sloop foundered in Liverpool Bay with the loss of all hands.
Planter	United Kingdom	The ship was run down and sunk in the River Thames near Blackwall, Middlesex by Jason (United Kingdom). Planter was on a voyage from Newcastle upon Tyne, Northumberland to London. She was later refloated.
Samuel	United Kingdom	The ship struck the Wheaten Rock and was severely damaged at Sligo.

== 22 November ==
List of shipwrecks: 22 November 1821
Ship	State	Description
Ann	United Kingdom	The ship was driven ashore and wrecked at Maryport, Cumberland with the loss of all but two of her crew.
Friendship	United Kingdom	The ship was driven ashore near Ayr. She was refloated in late December and taken in to Ayr for repairs.
John	Sweden	The ship ran aground on the Cross Sand, in the North Sea off Great Yarmouth, Norfolk, United Kingdom. She was refloated but consequently foundered with the loss of a crew member. John was on a voyage from Gothenburg to London, United Kingdom.
Oak	United Kingdom	The sloop foundered in the Formby Channel with the loss of all hands.
Providentia	Unknown	The ship foundered. Her crew were rescued by Sophia (Netherlands).

== 23 November ==
List of shipwrecks: 23 November 1821
Ship	State	Description
Byron	United Kingdom	The ship was wrecked on the Anegada Shoals, Virgin Islands. All on board were rescued. She was on a voyage from Trinidad to Cork.
Cambridge	United Kingdom	The sloop was driven ashore at Rock Ferry, Cheshire with the loss of two of her crew.
Charlotte	United Kingdom	The boat foundered in The Solent with the loss off all ten people on board.
Dolphin	United States	The schooner sprang a leak in the Atlantic Ocean and was abandoned by her crew. She was on a voyage from Yarmouth, Massachusetts to Halifax, Nova Scotia, British North America.

== 24 November ==
List of shipwrecks: 24 November 1821
Ship	State	Description
Ales	Russia	The brig ran agroubd on the Casquets, Channel Islands and broke in two. The thirteen crew were on the stern section, which floated off and subsequently came ashore on the Isle of Wight. United Kingdom on 29 December enabling the rescue of her crew. Ales was on a voyage from London, United Kingdom to St. Ubes, Spain.
Charlotte	United Kingdom	The ship foundered off the mouth of the River Usk. She was on a voyage from Bristol, Gloucestershire to Caerleon, Monmouthshire.
Industry	United Kingdom	The ship foundered in the North Sea off Hook of Holland, South Holland, Netherlands. Her crew were rescued. She was on a voyage from Newcastle upon Tyne, Northumberland to Rotterdam, South Holland.
Industry	United Kingdom	The ship was driven ashore in Loch Indaal. She was on a voyage from Liverpool, Lancashire to Sligo. Industry was later refloated.
Josephine	United Kingdom	The ship was driven ashore at "Emboulemens", British North America.
Lenox	(United Kingdom of Great Britain and Ireland) British North America	The ship was wrecked in the St. Lawrence River. Her crew were rescued. She was on a voyage from Quebec City, Lower Canada to Demerara.
Lively	United Kingdom	The schooner foundered in the Formby Channel with the loss of all hands. She was on a voyage from Dublin to Liverpool.
Mally	United Kingdom	The ship was driven ashore in Loch Indaal. She was on a voyage from Liverpool to Ballina, County Mayo.
Nancy	United Kingdom	The ship was wrecked on the Wild Fire Rocks, off Tynemouth, Northumberland.
Sterling	United Kingdom	The ship was wrecked at Quebec City. She was on a voyage from Quebec City to Barbados.
Tom	United Kingdom	The ship was wrecked a Quebec City. She was on a voyage from Liverpool to Quebec City.

== 25 November ==
List of shipwrecks: 25 November 1821
Ship	State	Description
Abeona	United Kingdom	The ship was abandoned in the North Sea. Her crew were rescued by Rowena (United Kingdom). She was on a voyage from Great Yarmouth, Norfolk to Naples, Kingdom of the Two Sicilies.
Auspicious	United Kingdom	The ship was driven ashore at Hubberston Pill, Pembrokeshire. She was on a voyage from Bristol, Gloucestershire to an Irish port. Auspicious was later refloated.
Ayaks (Аякс, 'Ajax')	Imperial Russian Navy	The brig ran aground 3 nautical miles (5.6 km) northwest of Schiermonnikoog near the Dutch coast. Three of her crew died in a launch wreck, the rest were rescued by Dutch fishermen. Ayaks was on a voyage from Kronstadt to Kamchatka. She was later refloated and taken in to Harlingen (or Zoutkamp), Netherlands, where she was repaired, returning to service in 1822.
Benson	United Kingdom	The ship was lost between Berck, Pas-de-Calais and Saint-Valery-sur-Somme, Somme, France with the loss of all hands. She was on a voyage from Newcastle upon Tyne, Northumberland to Topsham, Devon.
Fortune	Hamburg	The ship was lost between Berck and Saint-Valery-sur-Somme with the loss of six of her crew. She was on a voyage from Hamburg to Bordeaux, Gironde, France.
James & Ann	United Kingdom	The ship was wrecked on the coast of Gotland, Sweden. She was on a voyage from Saint Petersburg, Russia to London.
Mercurius	Denmark	The full-rigged ship was driven ashore and wrecked on Borkum, Kingdom of Hanover with the loss of four of her crew.
Nancy	United Kingdom	The ship was driven onto the Wild Fire Rocks, off Teignmouth, Devon and wrecked.
Prompt	United Kingdom	The ship was wrecked on Red Island, in the St. Lawrence River. All on board survived. She was on a voyage from Quebec, British North America to Greenock, Renfrewshire.
Venus	United Kingdom	The ship struck the pier and sank at Shoreham-by-Sea, Sussex.
Willem den Ersten	Netherlands	The ship was wrecked on the west coast of Guernsey, Channel Islands. Her crew were rescued. She was on a voyage from Ostend, West Flanders to Gibraltar.

== 26 November ==
List of shipwrecks: 26 November 1821
Ship	State	Description
Annesley	United Kingdom	The ship capsized at Ramsgate, Kent.
Jane	United Kingdom	The brig was lost at Bravo Point, Montevideo, Brazil. Her crew were rescued. She was on a voyage from Gibraltar to Montevideo and Buenos Aires, Argentina.
Richmond	United States	The ship was driven ashore and wrecked in Cardigan Bay with the loss of a crew member. She was on a voyage from New York to Liverpool, Lancashire, United Kingdom.
Sally	United Kingdom	The ship was driven ashore at Midia, Ottoman Empire with the loss of three of her crew.
Willem den Easten	Netherlands	The ship was wrecked on the west coast of Guernsey, Channel Islands. Her crew were rescued. She was on a voyage from Ostend to Gibraltar.

== 27 November ==
List of shipwrecks: 27 November 1821
Ship	State	Description
Ann	United Kingdom	The sloop was wrecked near Plockton and the Isle of Skye.
Bœupa	France	The ship foundered in the Bay of Biscay off Saint-Gilles-Croix-de-Vie, Vendée.
Brothers	United Kingdom	The ship ran aground on Mica Island, County Down. She was refloated but capsized. Her crew were rescued. Brothers was on a voyage from Arkhangelsk, Russia to Belfast, County Antrim. She came ashore near Dumfries on 5 December.
Catherine	United Kingdom	The ship was driven ashore and damaged near Strömstadt, Sweden. She was on a voyage from Saint Petersburg, Russia to London. Catherine was later refloated and taken in to Strömstadt.
Fly	United Kingdom	The ship was wrecked on the "Jadder", near Egersund, Norway. Her crew were rescued. She was on a voyage from Hamburg to Peterhead, Aberdeenshire.
George	United Kingdom	The ship was wrecked at Bald Cape, Africa. Her crew were rescued.
Goodintent	United Kingdom	The sloop was wrecked at Isleornsay, Isle of Skye.
Isabella	United Kingdom	The ship was driven ashore and wrecked near Egersund. Her crew were rescued. She was on a voyage from Gothenburg, Sweden to Arbroath, Forfarshire.
Richmond	United Kingdom	The ship foundered in Aberdaron Bay.
Wellington	United Kingdom	The ship was wrecked on "Handsort", off Saaremaa, Russia. Her crew were rescued. She was on a voyage from Saint Petersburg, Russia to Liverpool, Lancashire.

== 28 November ==
List of shipwrecks: 28 November 1821
Ship	State	Description
Edward	United Kingdom	The ship was driven ashore and wrecked at Hurst, Lymington, Hampshire. Her crew were rescued. She was on a voyage from Swanage, Dorset to Portsmouth, Hampshire
John Tobin	United Kingdom	The ship departed from Calabar, Nigeria for Liverpool, Lancashire. No further trace, presumed foundered in the Atlantic Ocean with the loss of all hands.
Rio de Santio	Spain	The brigantine was abandoned at sea. Her ten crew were rescued by Sceptre (United Kingdom). She was on a voyage from Campeche, Mexico to Havana, Cuba.
Union	United Kingdom	The ship was wrecked on the Haisborough Sands, in the North Sea off the coast of Norfolk. Her crew survived.
Zephyr	United Kingdom	The ship ran aground on the Smithie Sands, in the North Sea off Flamborough Head, Yorkshire and sank. Her crew were rescued.

== 29 November ==
List of shipwrecks: 29 November 1821
Ship	State	Description
Haabets Anker	Sweden	The ship was driven ashore near Strömstadt.
Jane and Isabella	United Kingdom	The ship was wrecked near "Skillingen", Jutland. Her crew were rescued. She was on a voyage from Hull, Yorkshire to Rotterdam, South Holland, Netherlands.
John Baker	United Kingdom	The ship was driven ashore at Lymington, Hampshire. She was on a voyage from London to Livorno, Grand Duchy of Tuscany.
Jonge Engberdens	Netherlands	The ship was wrecked near Fredrikshald, Norway. She was on a voyage from Danzig to Amsterdam, North Holland.
Mary	United Kingdom	The sloop was destroyed by fire at Fishguard, Pembrokeshire.
Moderator	United Kingdom	The ship departed from Cork for Bristol, Gloucestershire. No further trace, presumed foundered in the Irish Sea with the loss of all hands.
Prince Coburg	United Kingdom	The ship foundered in the North Sea off Flamborough Head, Yorkshire. Her crew were rescued. She was on a voyage from South Shields, County Durham to London.
Telegraph	United Kingdom	The ship foundered off Ayr with the loss of all hands. She was on a voyage from Ballywater, County Antrim to Stranraer, Wigtownshire.

== 30 November ==
List of shipwrecks: 30 November 1821
Ship	State	Description
Albion	United States	The ship was driven ashore and severely damaged in Bootle Bay. She was on a voyage from New York to Liverpool, Lancashire, United Kingdom. Albion was refloated on 2 December and taken in to Liverpool.
Amity	United States	The ship was driven ashore and wrecked at Liverpool.
Aurora	United Kingdom	The ship was driven ashore at Hoylake, Lancashire. She was on a voyage from Liverpool to Beaumaris, Anglesey.
Betsey	United Kingdom	The ship was driven ashore at Liverpool.
Betsey	United Kingdom	The ship was driven ashore at Orfordness, Suffolk. She was on a voyage from Hull, Yorkshire to London. Betsey was later refloated and taken in to Southwold, Suffolk.
Clyde	United Kingdom	The ship was driven ashore near Cairnryan, Wigtownshire. She was on a voyage from Glasgow, Renfrewshire to Liverpool. Clyde was refloated in late December.
Crescent	United Kingdom	The ship was driven ashore near Southport, Lancashire. She was on a voyage from Liverpool to the Clyde. Crescent was refloated on 10 December.
Eliza and Mary	United Kingdom	The ship was driven ashore at Limerick. She was later refloated.
Eliza Ann	United Kingdom	The ship departed from Scarborough, Yorkshire for London. No further trace, presumed foundered in the North Sea with the loss of all hands.
Elizabeth	United Kingdom	The ship foundered off "Helbree Island" with the loss of all hands.
Elizabeth	United States	The brig was driven ashore and wrecked at Liverpool with the loss of two of her crew. She was on a voyage from Savannah, Georgia to Liverpool.
Five Gebroeders	Bremen	The ship was wrecked on the Copper Sand, off the mouth of the Ems. She was on a voyage from Bremen to Amsterdam, North Holland, Netherlands.
Gebroeders	Netherlands	The ship was driven ashore on the east coast of Texel, North Holland. She was on a voyage from Amsterdam, North Holland to Port-au-Prince, Haiti.
HMS Harlequin	Royal Navy	The Cruizer-class brig-sloop was driven ashore in Clonderlaw Bay, County Clare. She was later refloated and returned to service.
Henry	United Kingdom	The brig was driven ashore at Workington, Cumberland.
Hope	United Kingdom	The brig was driven ashore and wrecked at "Cuberoon".
Industry	United Kingdom	The ship was driven ashore at Cairnryan. She was on a voyage from Fort William, Inverness-shire to Dublin.
Industry	United Kingdom	The ship departed from Scarborough for London. No further trace, presumed foundered in the North Sea with the loss of all hands.
Ivanhoe	United Kingdom	The paddle steamer was wrecked at Liverpool.
James	United Kingdom	The ship was driven ashore at "Cincarine Point".
Jane	United Kingdom	The brig was driven ashore in Clonderlaw Bay. She was on a voyage from Quebec, British North America to Waterford.
Jane	United Kingdom	The ship was driven ashore in Galway Bay. She was on a voyage from Lerwick, Shetland Islands to a Spanish port.
Johns	United Kingdom	The ship was sighted off Holyhead, Anglesey. No further trace, presumed foundered with the loss of all hands. She was on a voyage from Waterford to Liverpool.
Julie	France	The ship was driven ashore west of Rye, Sussex, United Kingdom. Her crew were rescued. She was on a voyage from Saint-Brieuc, Côtes-du-Nord to Rotterdam, South Holland, Netherlands.
Latona	United Kingdom	The schooner ran aground in the Clyde. She subsequently capsized and was wrecked in a gale. Her crew were rescued. Latona was bound for Porto, Portugal.
Lys	France	The ship was driven ashore at Peniche, Portugal. She was on a voyage from Marseille, Bouches-du-Rhône to Nantes, Loire-Inférieure.
Marion	United Kingdom	The ship was wrecked off Peel, Isle of Man with the loss of all eight crew. She was on a voyage from Cork to Ayr.
Mary	United Kingdom	The brig was driven ashore at Limerick.
New Triton	United Kingdom	The sloop foundered in the Irish Sea. She was on a voyage from Douglas, Isle of Man to Whitehaven.
Repeater	United Kingdom	The ship was driven ashore and wrecked in Pwllheli Bay. She was on a voyage from Baltimore, Maryland, United States to Liverpool.
Robert & Ann	United Kingdom	The ship was driven ashore near Cairnryan. She was on a voyage from Glasgow to Newry, County Antrim.
Sir William Maxwell	United Kingdom	The ship was driven ashore and damaged near Cairnryan. She was on a voyage from Ayr to Wigtown.
Thomas	United Kingdom	The ship was driven ashore at Limerick. She was later refloated.
Trafalgar	United Kingdom	The ship was driven ashore in Pwllheli Bay. She was on a voyage from Dublin to Liverpool.
Unity	United Kingdom	The ship was driven ashore at "Cincarine Point".

== Unknown date ==
List of shipwrecks: Unknown date in November 1821
Ship	State	Description
Adventure	United Kingdom	The ship was wrecked on the coast of Lincolnshire. She was on a voyage from Whitby, Yorkshire to Wisbech, Cambridgeshire.
Alberdina	Norway	The ship was wrecked on Heligoland. Her crew were rescued. She was on a voyage from Drøbak to the Ems.
Ann	United Kingdom	The brig foundered in the North Sea with the loss of all hands. She was on a voyage from London to Leeds, Yorkshire.
Ann	United Kingdom	The ship was driven ashore on the coast of County Donegal in early November.
Aristides	United Kingdom	The ship was captured by pirates whilst on a voyage from Liverpool, Lancashire to New Orleans, Louisiana. She was run aground and wrecked at Cape San Antonio, Cuba.
Clarkson	United Kingdom	The ship driven ashore on Crane Island in late November. She was on a voyage from Quebec City, Lower Canada, British North America to London. Clarkson was later refloated and taken in to Quebec City.
Commerce	France	The ship was driven ashore on Texel, North Holland, Netherlands. She was on a voyage from Arendal, Norway to Brest, Finistère.
Emperor Alexander	United Kingdom	The brig was wrecked near Portaferry, County Down. She was on a voyage from Liverpool to Bahia, Brazil.
Fame	United Kingdom	The brig sprang a leak and was abandoned off Barra Head, Outer Hebrides by seven of the ten people on board, who were rescued by Aimwell. She was on a voyage from Whitehaven, Cumberland to Miramichi Bay. Fame was later anchored off the coast of Uist, Outer Hebrides.
Friendship	United Kingdom	The ship departed from "Buctush", British North America for Liverpool. No further trace, presumed foundered with the loss of all hands.
George	United Kingdom	The ship departed from London for São Miguel Island, Azores, Portugal. No further trace, presumed foundered with the loss of all hands.
James	United Kingdom	The ship ran aground at Westport, County Mayo. She was on a voyage from Galway to Liverpool. James was refloated on 19 November and taken in to Westport.
Jonge	Netherlands	The ship foundered in the Baltic Sea. She was on a voyage from Kiel, Duchy of Holstein to Amsterdam, North Holland.
Levriet	Netherlands	The ship was wrecked on Walcheren, Zeeland. She was on a voyage from Antwerp to Lisbon, Portugal.
Mary	United Kingdom	The ship was wrecked in the Mull of Galloway. Her crew were rescued. She was on a voyage from the Clyde to Whitehaven, Cumberland.
Mary	United Kingdom	The ship departed from "Buctush" for Liverpool. No further trace, presumed foundered with the loss of all hands.
Mary and Eliza	United Kingdom	The ship struck rocks at South Shields, County Durham and was wrecked. She was on a voyage from Porto, Portugal to South Shields.
Mary Ann	Bremen	The ship was driven ashore at Newhaven, Sussex, United Kingdom in early December. She was on a voyage from Bremen to St. Thomas, Virgin Islands.
Mary Ann	United Kingdom	The ship departed from "Buctush" for Liverpool. No further trace, presumed foundered with the loss of all hands.
Morgenstern	Hamburg	The ship was driven ashore on Terschelling, Friesland, Netherlands. She was on a voyage from A Coruña, Spain to Hamburg.
Neptunus	Prussia	The ship was lost in the "Jadder". She was on a voyage from Bergen, Norway to Griefswald.
Osprey	United Kingdom	The ship foundered between Ireland and the Mull of Galloway on or before 21 November. She was on a voyage from Sicily to Dublin.
Packet	United States	The ship was wrecked off Cayo Romano, Cuba. There were four survivors. She was on a voyage from Cádiz, Spain to Havana, Cuba.
Peter and William	United Kingdom	The ship was wrecked on the Isle of Skye.
Resolution	United Kingdom	The ship was driven ashore on Spurn Point, Yorkshire in early November. She was later refloated and taken in to Hull, Yorkshire.
Rodney	United Kingdom	The ship was wrecked on the Kentish Knock, in the North Sea off Margate, Kent. She subsequently came ashore at Aldeburgh, Suffolk on 9 November.
Susan	United Kingdom	The ship was driven ashore and wrecked on the coast of County Donegal.
Sussex	United Kingdom	The ship was driven ashore on the coast of County Donegal in early November. She was on a voyage from Miramichi, New Brunswick, British North America to Liverpool.
Tartar	United Kingdom	The ship was driven ashore on Spurn Point in early November. She was refloated by 10 November.
Twa Broder	Sweden	The ship was driven ashore on the south coast of Gotland. She was on a voyage from Gothenburg to "Westerias". Twa Broder was later refloated and taken in to Rønne, Denmark for repairs.
Ulrica Frederica	Stettin	The ship was lost near Reval, Russia in early November. She was on a voyage from Saint Petersburg, Russia to Stettin.
Vrouw Christina	Kingdom of Hanover	The ship was lost in the "Jadder". She was on a voyage from Mandal, Norway to an East Frisian port.
William	United Kingdom	The ship was wrecked on Guernsey, Channel Islands. Her crew were rescued. She was on a voyage from Ostend, Netherlands to Gibraltar.
Young Roeloff	Netherlands	The ship foundered in the North Sea. Her crew were rescued. She was on a voyage from Kiel, Prussia to Amsterdam.
