= List of shipwrecks in May 1820 =

The list of shipwrecks in May 1820 includes ships sunk, wrecked or otherwise lost during May 1820.

== 2 May ==
List of shipwrecks: 2 May 1820
Ship	State	Description
Medea	Russia	The ship departed from Bahia, United Kingdom of Portugal, Brazil and the Algarves for Reval. No further trace, presumed founderedwith the loss of all hands.

== 3 May ==
List of shipwrecks: 3 May 1820
Ship	State	Description
Orb	United Kingdom	The ship ran aground of the Corton Sand, in the North Sea off the coast of Suffolk. She was on a voyage from Hamburg to London. Orb was later refloated with the assistance of three boats and taken in to Great Yarmouth, Norfolk.

== 7 May ==
List of shipwrecks: 7 May 1820
Ship	State	Description
Molly	United Kingdom	The ship was wrecked at Strangford, County Antrim. She was on a voyage from Whitehaven, Cumberland to Dublin.
Nestor	United Kingdom	The ship was driven ashore on Stroma. She was on a voyage from Aberdeen to the United States. Nestor was later refloated.
Phœnix	Prussia	The ship was wrecked at Memel, Prussia. Her crew were rescued. She was on a voyage from Memel to London, United Kingdom.
Richard	United Kingdom	The ship was driven ashore and wrecked at Great Egg Harbour, New Jersey, United States. All on board were rescued. She was on a voyage from Londonderry to Philadelphia, Pennsylvania, United States.

== 8 May ==
List of shipwrecks: 8 May 1820
Ship	State	Description
Eliza	United Kingdom	The ship capsized in the River Suir. She had nothing on board and it was expected that she would be righted without damage.
Four Sisters	India	The ship was wrecked in a hurricane at Madras with the loss of all but one of her crew.

== 9 May ==
List of shipwrecks: 9 May 1820
Ship	State	Description
Atlas	United Kingdom	The ship was wrecked at Poulicat, India with the loss of three of her crew.

== 10 May ==
List of shipwrecks: 10 May 1820
Ship	State	Description
Margaret	United Kingdom	The ship was driven ashore at Kingsdown, Kent. She was refloated.
Mary Ann	United States	The schooner was abandoned at sea. Her crew were rescued by Sophia (United Kingdom).
Noah	United Kingdom	The ship was wrecked near Barbados. Her crew were rescued. She was on a voyage from Dublin to "Margaritta".
Telegraph	United States	The ship was driven ashore and wrecked at Gravesend, Brooklyn, New York. She was on a voyage from New Orleans, Louisiana to New York.

== 11 May ==
List of shipwrecks: 11 May 1820
Ship	State	Description
Telegraph	United States	The ship was driven ashore and wrecked at Gravesend, New York. She was on a voyage from New Orleans, Louisiana to New York City.

== 12 May ==
List of shipwrecks: 12 May 1820
Ship	State	Description
Liveley	(United Kingdom of Great Britain and Ireland) British North America	The schooner was lost near Cape Negro, Nova Scotia. Her crew were rescued. She was on a voyage from Antigua to Halifax, Nova Scotia.
Rose	United Kingdom	The ship collided with an iceberg in the Grand Banks of Newfoundland. She was on a voyage from Jamaica to Liverpool, Lancashire. She consequently put in to Saint John's, Newfoundland, British North America on 23 May in a severely leaky condition.
Shamrock	United Kingdom	The ship ran aground on the North Bank, in Liverpool Bay. She was on a voyage from Liverpool to Belfast, County Antrim. She was refloated and put back to Liverpool.
William and Matthew	United Kingdom	The brig was wrecked on Cape Negro with the loss of two lives. She was on a voyage from London to Saint John, New Brunswick, British North America.

== 13 May ==
List of shipwrecks: 12 May 1820
Ship	State	Description
Alligator	United Kingdom	The ship was wrecked in the Gulf of St. Lawrence. The crew was saved
Minerva	United Kingdom	The brig was wrecked in the Saint Lawrence River 18 nautical miles (33 km) below Quebec City, Lower Canada, British North America. Her crew survived, arriving Quebec on 14 May afternoon, having seen their ship sink at 11pm. She was on a voyage from Liverpool, Lancashire to Montreal.

== 14 May ==
List of shipwrecks: 14 May 1820
Ship	State	Description
Nile	United Kingdom	The ship struck rocks and was wrecked off Cape Breton Island, Nova Scotia, British North America. She was on a voyage from Greenock, Renfrewshire to Chaleur Bay.

== 16 May ==
List of shipwrecks: 16 May 1820
Ship	State	Description
Boyton	United Kingdom	The ship was wrecked on Amherst Island, in Lake Ontario. She was on a voyage from Dublin to Miramichi Bay.
Harriet	(United Kingdom of Great Britain and Ireland) Guernsey	The ship was wrecked on Anticosti Island, Quebec, British North America. She was on a voyage from Guernsey to Gaspee Point, Rhode Island, United States.

== 17 May ==
List of shipwrecks: 17 May 1820
Ship	State	Description
Medea	Portugal	The ship departed from Bahia, Brazil for Faial Island, Azores. No further trace, presumed foundered with the loss of all hands.
Veronica	Hamburg	The ship was sunk by ice off Hogland, Russia Her crew were rescued. She was on a voyage from Hamburg to Saint Petersburg, Russia.

== 19 May ==
List of shipwrecks: 19 May 1820
Ship	State	Description
Alexander	United Kingdom	The ship was wrecked on the Southern Four Keys (Lighthouse Reef). She was on a voyage from London and Jamaica to British Honduras.
Bertha	Prussia	The ship was wrecked near Skagen, Denmark. She was on a voyage from Memel to Amsterdam, North Holland, Netherlands.
Jacoba	Netherlands	The ship was wrecked on the Kentish Knock, in the North Sea, with the loss of all but one of her crew. She was on a voyage from Amsterdam to Rouen, Seine-Inférieure, France.
Thetis	Stettin	The ship capsized off Anholt, Denmark. The wreck subsequently came ashore at Warberg. She was on a voyage from Cette, Hérault, France to Stettin.

== 20 May ==
List of shipwrecks: 20 May 1820
Ship	State	Description
William and Mary	United Kingdom	The ship was driven ashore at Poole, Dorset. She was on a voyage from Poole to Newcastle upon Tyne, Northumberland.

== 21 May ==
List of shipwrecks: 21 May 1820
Ship	State	Description
Frances Ann	United Kingdom	The ship was wrecked off St. Mary's Bay, Newfoundland, British North America. All on board were rescued. She was on a voyage from Irvine, Ayrshire to Chaleur Bay.
Halce	United Kingdom	The brig ran aground at Cape Spear, Newfoundland. Her crew were rescued.

== 23 May ==
List of shipwrecks: 23 May 1820
Ship	State	Description
Mary	United Kingdom	The ship was lost near Gaspee Point, Rhode Island, United States. Her crew were rescued. She was on a voyage from Waterford to Quebec, British North America.

== 24 May ==
List of shipwrecks: 25 May 1820
Ship	State	Description
Halec	United Kingdom	The brig ran aground and was wrecked at Cape Spear, Newfoundland. Her crew were rescued. She was on a voyage from Faial Island, Azores to Saint John's, Newfoundland.
Jacoba	Netherlands	The ship was lost on the Kentish Knock, in the North Sea with the loss of all but one of her crew. She was on a voyage from Amsterdam, North Holland to Rouen, Seine-Inférieure, France.

== 25 May ==
List of shipwrecks: 25 May 1820
Ship	State	Description
Active	United Kingdom	The ship ran aground on the Goodwin Sands, Kent. She was on a voyage from Waterford to London. She was refloated and put in to Ramsgate, Kent.
Flor de Tejo	Portugal	The ship was lost whilst on a voyage from Lisbon to Faial, Azores.

== 27 May ==
List of shipwrecks: 27 May 1820
Ship	State	Description
Aid	United Kingdom	The ship was struck a sunken wreck and was beached at Lowestoft, Suffolk. She was on a voyage from Sunderland, County Durham to London. Aid was later refloated and taken in to Great Yarmouth, Norfolk for repairs.

== 28 May ==
List of shipwrecks: 28 May 1820
Ship	State	Description
Flirt	United Kingdom	The ship foundered between Padstow and St. Ives, Cornwall. Her crew were rescued. She was on a voyage from Bristol, Gloucestershire to Portsmouth, Hampshire.
Pilot	United Kingdom	The ship departed from Bengal, India, for the United Kingdom. No further trace, presumed foundered with the loss of all hands.

== 31 May ==
List of shipwrecks: 31 May 1820
Ship	State	Description
Harmony	United Kingdom	The ship ran aground off Vlissingen, Zeeland, Netherlands. She was on a voyage from Liverpool, Lancashire to Antwerp, Netherlands. She was later refloated and completed her voyage, arriving on 6 June.

== Unknown date ==
List of shipwrecks: Unknown date in May 1820
Ship	State	Description
Abeona	United Kingdom	The ship was driven ashore and damaged at Quebec City, Lower Canada, British North America. She was on a voyage from Quebec City to London. Abeona was later refloated.
Cossack	United Kingdom	Cossack struck on Alcide Rock, near Bic Island. She was on a voyage from Liverpool to Montreal but had to discharge her cargo at Quebec as she had sustained damage. She arrived at Quebec on 20 May.
Freedom	United Kingdom	The ship was wrecked in the Gulf of St. Lawrence.
Irmaoem	Portugal	The ship was lost on Salt Island.
Lady of the Lake	United States	The ship capsized off Hawkins Point, Baltimore, Maryland in early May. Her crew were rescued. She was on a voyage from Baltimore to Havre de Grâce, Seine-Inférieure, France.
Mary and Jane	(United Kingdom of Great Britain and Ireland) British North America	The ship was wrecked in the Gulf of St. Lawrence.
Minerva	United Kingdom	The ship was wrecked in the Gulf of St. Lawrence.
Nostra Señora del Carmen	United Kingdom	The ship was lost on the Musquito Shore. She was on a voyage from Havana, Cuba to Chagres, Viceroyalty of New Granada.
Princess of Wales	United Kingdom	The whaler departed from The Downs for the South Seas. No further trace, presumed foundered with the loss of all hands.
Royal Oak	United Kingdom	The ship was driven ashore in the St. Lawrence River. She was on a voyage from Dublin to Quebec City.
Susannah	United Kingdom	The ship was wrecked in the Gulf of St. Lawrence.
Three Brothers	United Kingdom	The ship foundered in a hurricane at Madras, India.
William Pitt	(United Kingdom of Great Britain and Ireland) Bermuda	The brig was abandoned off Bermuda.
