= Providence (1790 ship) =

1790 ship

History

Great Britain
- Name: Providence
- Builder: John Wallis, South Shields1790
- Launched: 1790
- Fate: Wrecked February 1869

General characteristics
- Tons burthen: 2913/94, or 292, or 293, or 302 (bm)
- Armament: 1793: 2 × 4 + 2 × 3-pounder guns; 1805: 14 × 18-pounder carronades; 1813: 2 × 4-pounder guns + 6 × 18-pounder carronades

Providence was launched in 1790 at South Shields. She initially traded with Saint Petersburg but in 1804, the British Admiralty hired her to serve Royal Navy as a hired armed vessel. She remained in Royal Navy service until late 1812. She then returned to trading as a transport, coaster, and to the Baltic. She disappears from the registers between 1835 and 1850. She was wrecked in 1869 and broken up in 1870.

== Merchantman ==
Providence appeared in Lloyd's Register (LR) in 1792 with Hutchinson, master and owner, and trade Petersburg–London.

Year	Master	Owner	Trade	Source
1795	A.Cairnes	Hutchinson	Petersburgh–Plymouth	LR
1800	Hutchinson	Hutchinson	London–Petersburgh	LR
1805	Hutchinson	Hutchinson	London–Hamburg	LR
1806	Hutchinson	Hutchinson	Newcastle transport	Register of Shipping; thorough repair 1803 & 1804

== Hired armed ship ==
The Royal Navy hired Providence on 16 May 1804. Her captain was Commander Peter Rye. (Note: For more on Commander Peter Rye see: O'Byrne, William R. (1849). "Rye, Peter" . A Naval Biographical Dictionary. London: John Murray. and.)

On 14 September Providence captured the Prussian vessel Louisa Ulrica.

On 11 April 1805, Providence, the sloop Thames, and HMS Scorpion, captured the Dutch 12-gun schooner Eer (also known as De Eer, D'Eer or Honneur), under the command of Captain Antoine Doudet. She was carrying 1000 stands of arms, two 12-pounder field pieces, two mortars, uniforms for 1000 men, tents, and the like. (Note: Prize money for the capture was paid shortly after 11 November 1805.) (Note: Thames, of 11850/94 tons (bm) and ten 18-pounder carronades, served the Navy as a hired armed ship between 12 May 1804, and 6 December 1805. Knight mis-identifies Thames as the frigate HMS Thames, which was not launched until 24 October 1805.) She was also carrying M. Jean Saint-Faust who was traveling to Curaçao to assume command of the naval forces of the Batavian Republic.

On 28 May, Lloyd's List (LL) it reported that the armed ships Providence, Magdalen, Ranger, and Rosina had arrived at Elsinore on 14 May with their convoy.

In late February 1806, Providence was at Cuxhaven, having brought a convoy to the Elbe. In a gale the pilot ran her aground on the island of Pogen during a neap tide; the next high tide was four feet lower. She remained aground for five weeks. During this time the crew worked to lighten her. They put all her stores and provisions in the Danish government's storehouses at Gluckstadt. Danish labourers in six days dug a channel 473 ft (144.2 m) long, 30 ft (9.1 m) wide, and 6 ft (1.8 m) deep. Rye had the crew dig her anchor and keel free, enabling them to repair her caulking. Finally, on 6 April, in the evening, after more digging, Providence floated free. She returned to Cuxhaven, where the senior British naval officer ordered her out of the Elbe to return to Grimsby to avoid any risk of her being detained and her crew made prisoners.

On 1 July 1808 Providence detained and sent into Grimsby Vrow Maria Catharina, Visser, master.

Later, in September 1808, Rye fought off five Danish gunboats in light winds off Jutland. In October Providence escorted a convoy to Karlskrona. This was Rye's only passage through the Belt into the Baltic.

Commander Peter Rye attained post rank on 12 August 1812, but he was on convoy duty. Providence reached the Little Nore on 14 August. On 21 September he made his last entry in her log and he decommissioned her. During his time as her commander he had made 34 voyages to the North Sea and back, and had sailed 40,000 miles. Providence's contract with the Navy ended on 23 September 1812. (Note: Rye then commanded Porpoise from April 1813 until October 1814.)

== Merchantman ==
Providence apparently was not listed in LR between the end of her contract with the Royal Navy and reappearance in 1820. She was listed in the Register of Shipping (RS) from 1813 on.

Year	Master	Owner	Trade	Source & notes
1813	J.Spoor	Hutchinson	Shields transport	RS; thorough repair 1803, & repairs 1812
1818	Hutchinson	Hutchinson	Shields–London	RS; repairs 1812, & large repair 1817
1820	Hutchinson	Hutchinson	Hull–Petersburg	LR; large repairs 1815, repairs 1818
1825	Hutchinson	Hutchinson	Hull–Shields	LR; large repairs 1815, repairs 1818 & 1822, small repairs 1824
1830	Pyle	Hutchinson	Hull–Petersburg	LR; large repairs 1815, small repairs 1824, keel & damages repaired 1828
1835	"Richn'berg"			LR; homeport Newcastle
1840				LR – not listed
1845				LR – not listed
1850	Hutchinson	Hutchinson		LR
1855	B.Robson	Hutchinson	Shields–Mediterranean	LR; large repair 1847, small repairs 1854,
1860	H.Gaze	A.Strong	Shields–France	LR; large repair 1847, keel and keelson 1855,
1865	J.Hunter; H.Fox	T.Tillock	Shields–Mediterranean	LR; large repair 1847, keel and keelson 1855, small repairs 1861, small repairs 1865 & 1866
1869	H.Fox	T.Tillock	Shields–Mediterranean	LR; large repair 1847, keel and keelson 1855, small repairs 1861, small repairs 1865 & 1866

== Fate ==
Providence was wrecked on 13 February 1869, on Corton Sands, near Great Yarmouth. Her entry was closed on the Register on 31 March 1870, with the notation "condemned & broken up at North Shields". This suggests that Providence had been refloated and brought back to Shields for breaking up. Her listing in Lloyd's Register for 1869 carried the annotation "broken up".
