= R. cinnabarina =

R. cinnabarina may refer to:

- Ramboldia cinnabarina, a lichenized fungus
- Rhodymenia cinnabarina, a red algae
- Russula cinnabarina, a mycorrhizal fungus
