= Magdalen (1802 ship) =

History

United Kingdom
- Name: Magdalen
- Builder: Methil
- Launched: 1802
- Fate: Last listed 1853

General characteristics
- Tons burthen: Originally: 212, or 215, or 2155/94 (bm); After lengthening (1823): 281
- Armament: 1805: 14 × 18-pounder carronades; 1810: 2 × 4-pounder guns + 10 × 9-pounder carronades; 1815: 10 × 12-pounder carronades

Magdalen (or Magdalene, or Magdalena) was launched in 1802 at Mehil, Fife. From 1804 to 1805, she served on convoy duty in the North Sea for the British Royal Navy as a hired armed ship. She then returned to mercantile service and continued to sail for over 45 years, going as far as Malta and Quebec, though mostly sailing along Britain's coasts. She was last listed in Lloyd's Register (LR) in 1853.

== Career ==
Magdalen first appeared in the Register of Shipping in the supplemental pages to the 1802 volume. It showed her with Brown, master, Scougal, owner, and trade Leith-Petersburg.

The Royal Navy hired her on 14 April 1804. During the term of government service Lloyd's Register (LR) carried Magadalena as a Leith-based transport. Her captain was Commander Joseph L.Popham.

Lloyd's List (LL) reported on 27 July 1804 that Magdalen armed ship had arrived at Leith from Tonningen. On 10 August Magdalen armed ship had arrived at Tonningen from Leith.

Lloyd's List reported on 21 May 1805 that the armed brig Magdalen had run afoul of Atalanta in the Naze of Norway. Atalanta, Humble, master, had been sailing to Copenhagen and had to put back to Newcastle. Then on 28 May it reported that the armed ships Magdalen, Providence, Ranger, and Rosina had arrived at Elsinore on 14 May with their convoy.

Magdalen's contract finished on 19 December 1805.

The Register of Shipping for 1806 showed Magdalen with Hopkins, master, Scougal, owner, and trade Leith–Government service.

In 1806–1807 Magdalen was in the Mediterranean. On 29 November 1806 Magdalen, Hopkins, master, arrived at Cagliari. She was returning to London from Malta, but had it had taken her 53 days to get that far.

Year	Master	Owner	Trade	Source & notes
1810	J.Beatson	Beatson	London–Quebec	RS
1815	Facey; Fenwick	Parker	London–Quebec	RS
1820	Forrester	Maard	London coaster	RS
1825	A.Robson	Lamb & Co.	Shields–London	RS; new deck, repairs, and lengthening 1823
1830	A.Robson	Lamb & Co.	Shields–London	RS; new deck, repairs, and lengthening 1823
1835	Nicholoson			LR; homeport Newcastle
1840	R.Watson	Ridley & Co.	London–Newcastle	LR
1845				LR; not listed
1850	Watson	Ridley	Newcastle–London	LR; lengthened 1832 & large repairs 1849

== Fate ==
Magadalene was last listed in Lloyd's Register in 1853.
