= HMS Porpoise (1804) =

Former Mercantile Quarter decked Sloop Lord Melville (Store ship)

History

United Kingdom
- Name: Lord Melville
- Builder: Temple shipbuilders, South Shields
- Launched: 1804
- Fate: Sold 1804

United Kingdom
- Name: HMS Porpoise
- Acquired: By purchase c. September 1804
- Fate: Sold 1816

United Kingdom
- Name: Lord Melville
- Owner: J.R. Bell & Co.
- Acquired: 1816 by purchase
- Fate: Last listed in 1820

General characteristics
- Type: Brig
- Tons burthen: 399, or 400, or 412 (bm)
- Length: 100 ft 1 in (30.5 m) (overall); 78 ft 1 in (23.8 m) (keel)
- Beam: 30 ft 10 in (9.4 m)
- Depth of hold: 13 ft 0 in (4.0 m)
- Complement: 70
- Armament: Upper deck: 8 × 18-pounder carronades; Forecastle: 2 × 6-pounder; Bow chasers: 2 × 9-pounder guns as storeship

HMS Porpoise was the former mercantile quarter-decked sloop Lord Melville, which the Royal Navy purchased in 1804 to use as a store-ship.

She sailed to the colony of New South Wales in January 1806, arriving seven months later. She was the flagship of William Bligh when he was governor of New South Wales and played a prominent role in the Rum Rebellion. In May 1810 Porpoise sailed from Sydney; after arriving in Britain she underwent a major refit. After voyages to the West Indies, the Cape of Good Hope and North America she served as a harbour ship at Woolwich and Sheerness. She was laid up in 1814 and sold in January 1816.

She then returned to mercantile service under her original name and made one voyage transporting convicts to New South Wales, and a second to Van Diemen's Land. She was last listed in 1820.

== Naval service ==
Lord Melville was built at South Shields, England. The Royal Navy purchased her in September 1804 and fitted her out at Deptford between March and July 1805 for service as a storeship. She was renamed Porpoise and commissioned in April 1805 under Commander Joseph Short as a flagship for Commodore William Bligh. Bligh was formally appointed captain of Porpoise on 13 November 1805.

=== Voyage to Australia ===
On 28 January 1806 she left Portsmouth for New South Wales, escorting the transports Lady Madeleine Sinclair, Fortune, Alexander, Elizabeth, and Justina. Lady Madeleine Sinclair was also carrying Bligh, who was sailing to the colony to assume the governorship. Unfortunately, the Admiralty's orders were ambiguous as to whether Bligh or Short was in command of the convoy. At one point Bligh ignored a signal from Short to return Lady Madeleine Sinclair to her course, after Bligh had ordered a change in direction. Short responded by ordering his first lieutenant, John Putland, to fire one shot across her bows, and then a second across her stern; Bligh ignored both. Short considered ordering Putland to fire a third shot into her, but decided against it. This was fortunate as Bligh was Putland's father-in-law, and Putland's wife Mary was accompanying her father on Lady Madeleine Sinclair.

The convoy passed Madeira on 25 February and were reported all well on 5 March. On 14 May Porpoise, the storeship Woolwich, and the brig Rolla detained and sent into the Cape of Good Hope the Danish packet ship Trende Sostre (Three Sisters).

=== Service in Australia ===
Porpoise arrived in Sydney Harbour on 6 August. Bligh assumed the governorship of the colony and retained Porpoise to act as its principal naval unit. In January 1807 Short returned to Britain on HMS Buffalo. In his absence Bligh appointed Putland to command Porpoise. Putland died of tuberculosis on 4 January 1808.

Porpoise then came under the command of Lieutenant James S.G. Symons (acting). In April 1808 Lieutenant William George Carlile Kent (acting), replaced Symons, who had discharged himself (that is, deserted) from the vessel and returned to Britain. Later, Bligh pressed charges against Kent for Kent's actions during the Rum Rebellion while Bligh was under arrest. The court martial exonerated Kent, saying that he had tried to carry out his duty for "the good of His Majesty's service" under "extreme and extraordinary difficulties".

In 1808, Lieutenant John Porteous, formerly captain of the royal yacht, was appointed to the rank of Commander and sent out to New South Wales to assume command of Porpoise. He took command in January 1809.

On 29 February 1809 Bligh boarded Porpoise after being held under house arrest for over a year following a revolt by the New South Wales Corps, known as the Rum Rebellion. For a little while he blockaded the port with the idea of capturing the convict transport Admiral Gambier, but changed his mind and sailed for Hobart.

Colonel Lachlan Macquarie of the 73rd Regiment of Foot arrived in Sydney with HMS Hindostan and HMS Dromedary on 28 December 1809 and assumed the governorship. Porpoise and Bligh returned to Sydney on 17 January 1810. In May Porpoise, Hindostan, and Dromedary sailed for Britain.

=== Further service ===
After returning to Britain Porpoise refitted at Woolwich between May and August 1811. Between 1811 and 1812 she was under the command of T. Stokes, master. She made voyages to the West Indies, the Cape of Good Hope, and North America.

Captain Peter Rye, who had been posted captain in 1812 from the hired armed ship Providence commanded Porpoise from April 1813 until October 1814. Between December 1813 and February 1814 she was at Deptford fitting out to serve as a receiving ship at Woolwich. She then served as a 16-gun guardship at Sheerness.

=== Disposal ===
Porpoise was laid up in ordinary in 1815. The "Principal Officers and Commissioners" of the Royal Navy offered Porpoise for sale in November 1815. She sold on 16 January 1816 for £1,600.

== Lord Melville again ==
Lord Melville, built at Shields and of 400 tons (bm), reappears in the Register of Shipping for 1816 with Weatherall, master, Bell & Co., owner, and trade London–Botany Bay.

On 15 September 1816, Captain Thackray Weatherall sailed her from England. Lord Melville arrived at Sydney on 24 February 1817. She had embarked 103 female prisoners, two of whom died en route On 1 May she sailed for Batavia.

In July 1818 Weatherall again sailed with convicts for Australia; this was the first voyage direct from England to Hobart. Lord Melville arrived on 17 December. This time she carried 149 male convicts, one of whom died on the voyage.

== Fate ==
Lord Melville's fate after 1820 is currently obscure.
