= Rutland Island, County Donegal =

Island and surrounding area in Ireland

Rutland Island Inishmacadurn
Native name: Inis Mhic an Doirn
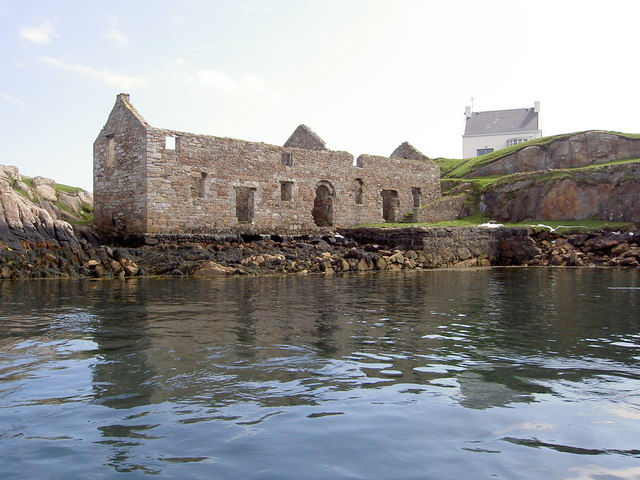
- Remains of Conyngham's fishing complex on Rutland Island.

- Location within island of Ireland

Geography
- Location: Atlantic Ocean
- Coordinates: 54°58′45″N 8°27′32″W

Administration
- Ireland
- Province: Ulster
- County: Donegal

Demographics
- Population: 12 (2022)

Rutland Island or Inishmacadurn (Irish: Inis Mhic an Doirn) is an island in County Donegal, Ireland. It is also an electoral and census reporting district covering the island, surrounding islands and part of the mainland. It lies between the village of Burtonport and Arranmore Island.

Anglo-Irish politician William Burton Conyngham founded a fishing village on the island in the 1780s, re-naming it in honour of the British chief governor, Charles Manners, 4th Duke of Rutland. This largely fell into ruin soon after.

== History ==
The island was originally called Inis Mhic an Doirn, anglicised Inishmacadurn or Inishmacdurn. It was known for its herring fishery. In 1783–1784, Anglo-Irish politician William Burton Conyngham founded a company to take advantage of the island, aiming to make it into a major fishing station. A fish processing facility and a planned settlement were built. It included streets of houses and businesses, a customs house, a barracks, and a sail and net factory. Conyngham re-named the island "Rutland", in honour of the British Lord Lieutenant of Ireland at the time, Charles Manners, 4th Duke of Rutland (England).

However, fish catches declined heavily soon after construction, and in 1793, the fishery failed. Part of the village also became half-buried under sand dunes. Nevertheless, the island remained inhabited into the 1960s.

Mains electricity reached the island in 1957, due to its being a crucial stepping stone for the Arranmore supply, but piped water has never been provided for its remaining housing stock, which consists entirely of holiday homes.

Rutland Island has become a popular holiday destination with a number of holiday homes built in the first decade of the 2000s.

=== Demographics ===
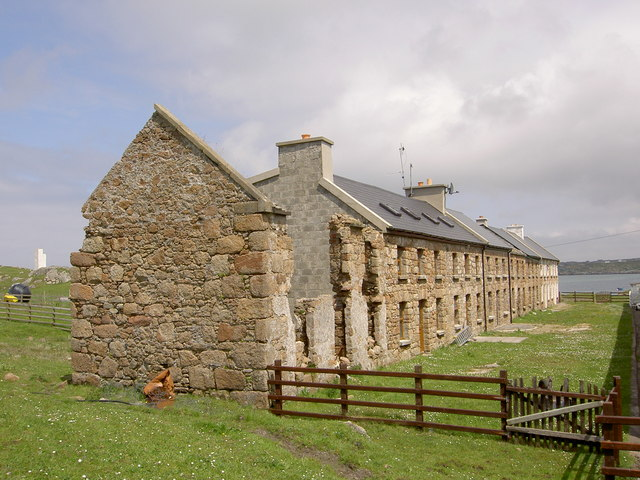
Tarent Street, Rutland Island, built 1789

The table below reports data on Rutland's population taken from Discover the Islands of Ireland (Alex Ritsema, Collins Press, 1999) and the Census of Ireland. Census data in Ireland before 1841 are not considered complete and/or reliable.

Historical population

Year	Pop.	±%
1841	125	—
1851	108	−13.6%
1861	75	−30.6%
1871	69	−8.0%
1881	85	+23.2%
1891	87	+2.4%
1901	65	−25.3%
1911	78	+20.0%
1926	41	−47.4%

Year	Pop.	±%
1936	38	−7.3%
1946	50	+31.6%
1951	35	−30.0%
1956	15	−57.1%
1961	7	−53.3%
1966	2	−71.4%
1971	2	+0.0%
1979	0	−100.0%
1981	0	0.00%

Year	Pop.	±%
1986	4	—
1991	0	−100.0%
1996	0	0.00%
2002	0	0.00%
2006	13	—
2011	1	−92.3%
2016	5	+400.0%
2022	12	+140.0%

Source: Central Statistics Office. "CNA17: Population by Off Shore Island, Sex and Year". CSO.ie.

== Fauna ==
Badgers have been recorded from this island. There is evidence that their diet is poor.

The island is also home to some foxes.

== Flora ==
The following algae have been reported from Rutland South Channel: Gracilaria gracilis (Stackhouse) Steentoft, L.M. Irvine et Farnham; Rhodymenia holmesii Ardissone; Polysiphonia fucoides (Hudson) Greville; Polysiphonia nigra (Hudson) Batters; Sphondylothamnion multifidum (Hudson) Nägeli; Heterosiphonia plumosa (J. Ellis) Batters.
