= Vanguard (1799 ship) =

History

Great Britain
- Name: Vanguard
- Builder: Liverpool
- Launched: 1799
- Fate: Captured 17 May 1809

General characteristics
- Tons burthen: 300, or 353 (bm)
- Complement: 1799:36; 1800:36; 1803:40; 1804:35; 1806:40
- Armament: 1799:18 × 9&12-pounder guns; 1800:18 × 9-pounder guns; 1803:14 × 6&9-pounder guns; 1804:20 × 12&6-pounder guns; 1806:20 × 9&12-pounder guns; 1808:16 × 9=pounder + 4 ×12-pounder guns

Vanguard was launched in Liverpool in 1799. She made four voyages as a slave ship in the triangular trade in enslaved people. After the outlawing of the British slave trade she became a West Indiaman. A French privateer captured her in March 1809.

== Career ==
=== 1st voyage transporting enslaved people (1799–1800) ===
Captain John Whittle acquired a letter of marque on 1 November 1799. He sailed from Liverpool on 7 December. In 1799, 156 vessels sailed from English ports bond for Africa to acquire and transport enslaved people; 134 of these vessels sailed from Liverpool.

Whittle purchased captives at Bonny Island. Vanguard arrived at Jamaica on 29 June 1800, with 273 captives. She left Jamaica on 2 September in company with Alexander and some other vessels sailing to Liverpool, and arrived back at Liverpool on 7 November. She had left Liverpool with 45 crew members and suffered 12 crew deaths on her voyage.

Vanguard appeared in Lloyd's Register (LR) in 1801 with J.Whittle, master, changing to D. Findlay, Dickson, owner, and trade Liverpool–Africa, changing to Liverpool–Jamaica. Captain David Findlay acquired a letter of marque on 8 December 1800.

=== 2nd voyage transporting enslaved people (1802–1804) ===
Captain William Taylor sailed from Liverpool on 15 October 1802, during the Peace of Amiens. In 1802, 155 vessels sailed from English ports bond for Africa to acquire and transport enslaved people; 122 of these vessels sailed from Liverpool.

War with France broke out again in early 1803 and Taylor was issued a letter of marque in absentia on 22 July, shortly before Vanguard arrived in Grenada on 29 August. He had purchased captives first at Anomabu and then at Cape Coast Castle, and arrived with 304. Vanguard sailed 22 November 1803, and arrived back at Liverpool on 22 January 1804. She had left Liverpool with 40 crew members and she suffered eight crew deaths on the voyage.

Taylor was no longer master of Vanguard when she was off Barbados before having delivered her captives, having been replaced by John Pince. However, by the time she arrived back at Liverpool Richard Burrows had replaced Pince. The reason Pince replaced Taylor is that the two had entered into an illegal contract. Pince, knowing that his reputation as a cruel master would hamper his getting a crew, agreed with Taylor that Taylor would be the nominal master for a bonus of £50, and that Pince would become master once the voyage was under way, with Taylor reverting to chief mate. The illegality rested in that the regulations of the slave trade required the actual master to sign various documents and give various undertakings. Taylor left Vanguard on the African coast and made his own way back to England. He had brought the case against Vanguard's owners for lost wages and some other income and the court ruled that under the circumstances nothing was due either to Taylor or to the owners. John Pince died aboard Vanguard after a short illness as she was sailing from Grenada to Tortola. The announcement in Lloyd's List's ship arrival and departure (SAD) data of Vanguard's return simply recorded "Vanguard, late Pine".

=== 3rd voyage transporting enslaved people (1804–1805) ===
Captain Richard Wilding acquired a letter of marque on 8 October 1804. He sailed from Liverpool on 1 November 1804. In 1804, 147 vessels sailed from English ports bond for Africa to acquire and transport enslaved people; 126 of these vessels sailed from Liverpool.

Wilding purchased captives in the Congo River. Vanguard arrived at Barbados where she landed a few captives, and then sailed on to Tortola where she landed the rest. In all she landed 290 slaves. She sailed from Tortola on 16 October 1805, and arrived back at Liverpool on 13 December. She had sailed from Liverpool with 51 crew members and she suffered seven crew deaths on the voyage.

=== 4th voyage transporting enslaved people (1806–1807) ===
Captain James Barr acquired a letter of marque on 18 April 1806. He sailed from Liverpool on 15 May 1806. Barr purchased captives at Bonny Island and stopped at São Tomé before sailing on to the West Indies.

LL reported on 6 February 1807, that Vanguard, of Liverpool, Barr, master, which had been reported to have been taken off Old Calabar by two French frigates and a brig, had arrived at Jamaica on 8 December 1806, from Bonny.

Vanguard arrived at Kingston, Jamaica, on 8 December 1806. There she landed 372 captives. She sailed from Kingston on 22 March 1807 and arrived back at Liverpool on 12 May. She had sailed from Liverpool with 47 crew members and she suffered three crew deaths on the voyage.

=== Post-slave trade ===
The Slave Trade Act 1807 forbade British participation in the slave trade, forcing owners to deploy their vessels in other trades. Vanguard became a West Indiaman. LR for 1808 showed her master as Kitchen & Co., and her trade as Liverpool–Trinidad. Robert Kitchen and Benjamin Cors had been Vanguard's owner on her fourth voyage transporting enslaved people.

== Fate ==
On 17 March 1809 Lloyd's List reported that the French privateer Embuscade had captured Vanguard after an action lasting an hour and a half. Vanguard had been sailing from Trinidad to London, and Embuscade took her into Dieppe. Earlier, Vanguard had been able to capture a French privateer and to repel attacks by two others. Embuscade's captain was Antoine-Joseph Preira, a noted privateer captain.

LR for 1809 carried unchanged data for Vanguard from the 1808 volume, except that it had the annotation "captured".
