= Sinclair (1805 ship) =

History

United Kingdom
- Name: Sinclair
- Owner: W. Osborne (or Osbourne)
- Builder: Scotland
- Launched: 1805

General characteristics
- Tons burthen: 610 (bm)
- Propulsion: Sail
- Complement: 1805: 50; 1811: 40; 1813: 50
- Armament: 1805: 12 × 24-pounder + 4 × 9-pounder guns (Note: The 24-pounder guns were "short cannon of the New Construction".); 1811: 2 × 9-pounder guns + 18 × 18-pounder carronades; 1813: 20 × 18 & 9-pounder cannons

Sinclair, also known as Lady Madeline Sinclair (or Lady Sinclair, or Lady Madalina Sinclair, was a three-decker sailing ship built in Scotland but registered at Kingston upon Hull, England. She was built of fir, which made for speedier construction at the expense of durability. She made two voyages to New South Wales, and on her first return voyage, via China, she carried a cargo for the British East India Company.

== Career ==
Captain John Hardy Jackson received a letter of marque on 14 October 1805. This authorized he and Sinclair to engage in offensive action against the French, not just defensive, should the occasion arise.

She sailed as part of convoy in 1806 under the escort of Porpoise that included the transports Elizabeth, Justina, and Alexander, and the convict transport Fortune. Sinclair was carrying stores, passengers, and some convicts.

The convoy passed Madeira on 25 February and were reported all well on 5 March. Sinclair was also carrying Captain William Bligh, who was sailing to the colony to assume the governorship.

Captain Bligh and Commander Joseph Short of Porpoise disagreed continually through the voyage as each believed they were in charge of the convoy. When Bligh ordered a change of course for Sinclair, Short responded by ordering first officer John Putland to fire warning shots at Sinclair, which carried Putland's wife, Mary, and his father-in-law, Captain Bligh. In great distress, John Putland complied with the order, firing two warning shots across the bow of Sinclair. When Sinclair did not immediately return on course, Short contemplated firing on Sinclair. Fortunately, Sinclair shortly afterwards corrected her course and he did not have to order Putland to fire. When the convoy arrived in Port Jackson on 6 August 1806, Bligh assumed the governorship of the colony.

Sinclair left Sydney on 12 September 1806 with a cargo of oil and 14,000 seal skins for China. Sinclair and Captain Jackson left Whampoa anchorage on 3 January 1807. She reached Penang on 25 January and St Helena on 18 April, before arriving at The Downs on 3 July.

Sinclair made a second voyage to Australia, still under Moore's command. She arrived at Sydney on 28 July 1808, carrying Lieutenant-Colonel Joseph Foveaux, the new Lieutenant Governor of the colony, and 45 troops. She left on 26 October for England.

Sinclair continued to trade under a letter of marque for some time thereafter.

Captain George Allen received a letter of marque on 16 April 1811.

Captain John Peat received a letter of marque on 4 January 1813.
