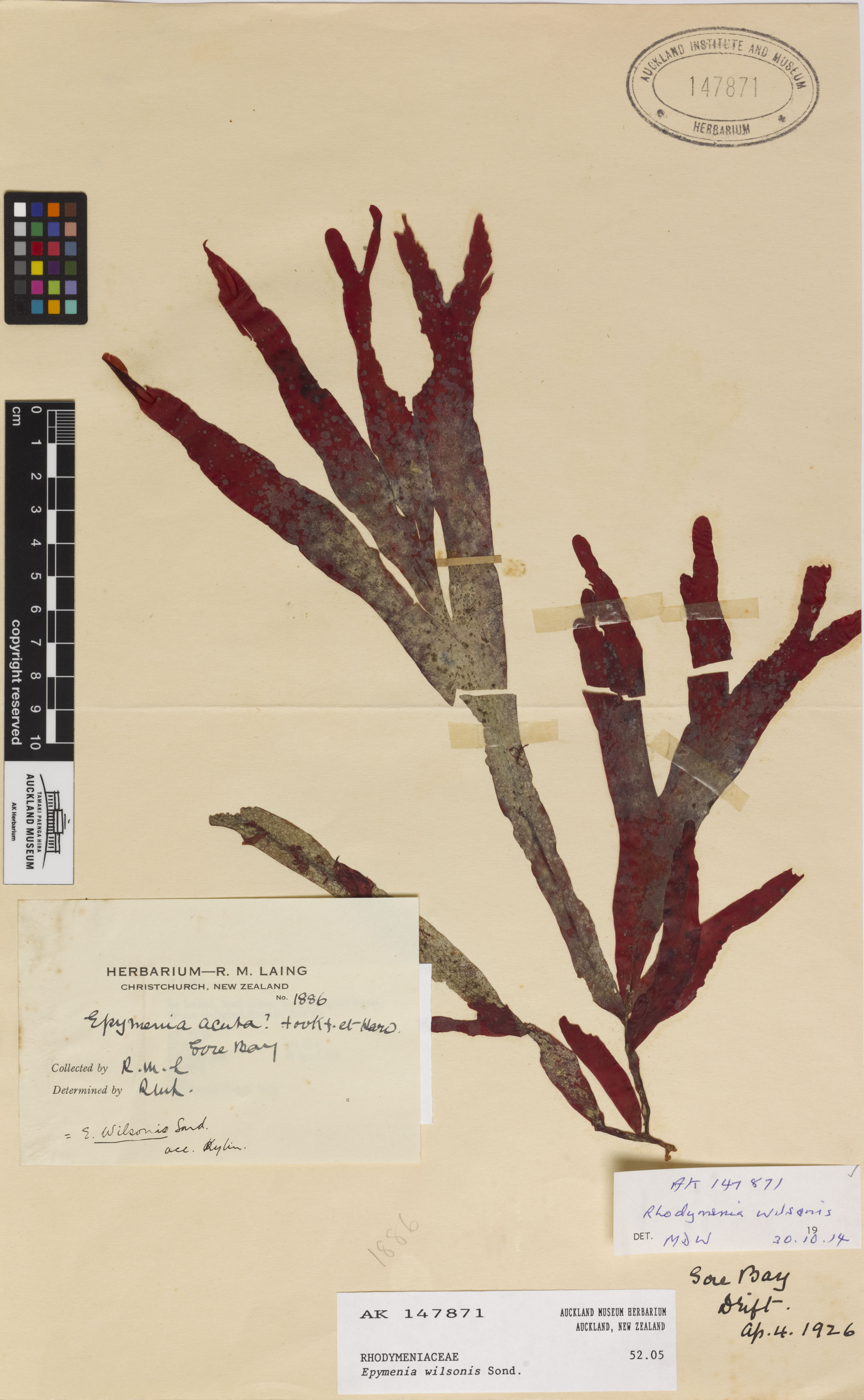

Scientific classification
- Domain: Eukaryota
- Supergroup: Archaeplastida
- Division: Rhodophyta
- Class: Florideophyceae
- Order: Rhodymeniales
- Family: Rhodymeniaceae
- Genus: Rhodymenia
- Species: R. wilsonis

Binomial name
- Rhodymenia wilsonis (Sonder) G.W.Saunders

= Rhodymenia wilsonis =

Species of alga

Rhodymenia wilsonis is a species of marine red algae first described in 2010. In New Zealand it was previous known as Rhodymenia obtusa and Epymenia wilsonis.

This species is distributed along the coastline of Australia and the islands of New Zealand including both the North and South islands, Chatham Islands, Stewart Island / Rakiura, Snares Island / Tini Heke, and the Auckland Islands.
