= Fortune (1805 ship) =

Sailing ship built in Spain

History

United Kingdom
- Name: Fortune
- Owner: Peter Everitt Mestaer
- Launched: Spain
- Acquired: 1805 by purchase
- Fate: Lost c. 1814

General characteristics
- Tons burthen: 620, or 626 (bm)
- Propulsion: Sail
- Complement: 1806: 50; c. 1812: 50
- Armament: 1806: 20 × 6-pounder guns; c. 1812: 6 × 6-pounder guns
- Notes: Built of mahogany

Fortune, also known as La Fortune, was a sailing ship built in Spain. She was taken in prize in 1804. New owners renamed her and she entered British registers in 1805–6. She twice transported convicts from Britain to New South Wales. She was lost c. 1814 on her way to China from Australia.

== Career ==
Fortune was built in Spain under another name. In 1804 she was taken in prize, condemned, and sold. Mestaer and company purchased her and renamed her. She first appeared in the supplemental pages to Lloyd's Register for 1805, and in the Register of Shipping in 1806.

=== 1st convict voyage (1806) ===
Captain Henry Moore received a letter of marque on 7 January 1806. This authorized him to engage in offensive action against the French, not just defensive, should the opportunity arise.

Captain Moore sailed Fortune from England on 28 January 1806. She was part of a convoy under the escort of Porpoise that included the merchant transports (Lady Madeleine) Sinclair, Elizabeth, Justina, and the fellow convict transport Alexander. The vessels passed Madeira on 25 February and were reported all well on 5 March. Fortune arrived at Rio de Janeiro on 11 April and left on 30 April. She arrived at Port Jackson on 27 July.

Fortune had embarked some 245 male convicts, three of whom died on the voyage. The 8th Royal Veteran Battalion provided the guard, and one member of the guard also died on the voyage.

Fortune left Port Jackson on 19 August bound for China.

=== 2nd convict voyage (1812–13) ===
Captain Thomas Walker received letter of marque against America №106. He sailed Fortune on her second convict voyage to Australia, leaving England on 3 December 1812. She stopped at Rio de Janeiro between 3 February and 22 March 1813. She arrived at Port Jackson on 11 June 1813. She had embarked 201 male convicts; five convicts died on the voyage. The 73rd Regiment of Foot provided an officer and 30 rank-and-file to serve as the guard. One soldier died en route.

Fortune left Port Jackson on 14 September bound for China. Lloyd's List for 28 October 1814 reported that Fortune, Walker, master, had left Sydney on 13 September 1813 and had not been heard from since. It was feared that she had foundered. However, on 29 November, Lloyd's List reported that Fortune had sailed from Ambonya in the middle of November (1813), and arrived at Ternate after a tedious voyage from Sydney.

== Fate ==
There was no further trace. Fortune was presumed to have foundered with the loss of all hands.

The 1815 volume of the Register of Shipping has the notation "LOST" against her name, and she does not appear in the 1816 volume. Fortune is no longer listed in Lloyd's Register in 1818.
