= Rosina (1803 ship) =

History

United Kingdom
- Name: Rosina
- Builder: Hull
- Launched: 1803
- Fate: Last listed in 1818

General characteristics
- Tons burthen: 315 (bm)
- Armament: 1805: 14 × 18-pounder carronades; 1810: 2 × 6-pounder guns; 1812: 8 × 18-pounder carronades

Rosina was launched at Hull in 1803. She almost immediately became a hired armed ship for the British Royal Navy for about a year. After she returned to her owners she became a West Indiaman and then a transport. She was last listed in 1818.

== Hired armed ship ==
The Royal Navy hired Rosina on 6 May 1804, having greatly increased her armament. Her captain was Commander Fasham Roby. She first appeared in Lloyd's List's (LL) ship arrival and departure (SAD) data as having left Sheerness on 8 June 1804 bound for Tonningen, together with the armed cutter Success. On 27 September she sailed from Sheerness with a convoy of 13 for the Baltic. In October she arrived at the Humber with 50 vessels. On 20 October she sailed from Elsinore with a fleet for the Nore.

On 28 May 1805 Lloyd's List (LL) reported that the armed ships Rosina, Magdalen, Ranger, and Providence had arrived at Elsinore on 14 May with their convoy. The pattern of Rosina escorting convoys between Sheerness or the Nore and Elsinore continued in 1805.

On 10 September Rosina left Saint Petersburg, escorting a fleet of merchantmen. On 6 October they encountered a gale that resulted in the loss of some 30 of the merchantmen on the Riga Bar. Eleven were transports laden with stores.

Rosina's contract finished on 20 November 1805. (Note: Fasham Roby died in April 1808 while captain of HMS Fawn.)

== Merchantman ==
After Rosina was returned to her owners, she became a West Indiaman, sailing to Jamaica.

| Year | Master | Owner | Trade | Source & notes |
|---|---|---|---|---|
| 1806 | Denton; R.Brown | Howarth | Hull–London; London–Jamaica | Register of Shipping |
| 1810 | R.Brown | Howarth | London–Jamaica | Register of Shipping |

The entry for Rosina in the 1810 issue of the Register of Shipping bears the annotation "Lost". There no mention of this in Lloyd's List, but Rosina was absent from the Register of Shipping in 1811.

Rosina returned to the Register of Shipping in 1812 with new owners, suggesting that she had been salvaged.

| Year | Master | Owner | Trade | Source & notes |
|---|---|---|---|---|
| 1812 | H.Rudstone | Clarkson | London transport | Register of Shipping |
| 1818 | H.Rudstone | Clarkson | London transport | Register of Shipping |

== Fate ==
Rosina was last listed in 1818.
