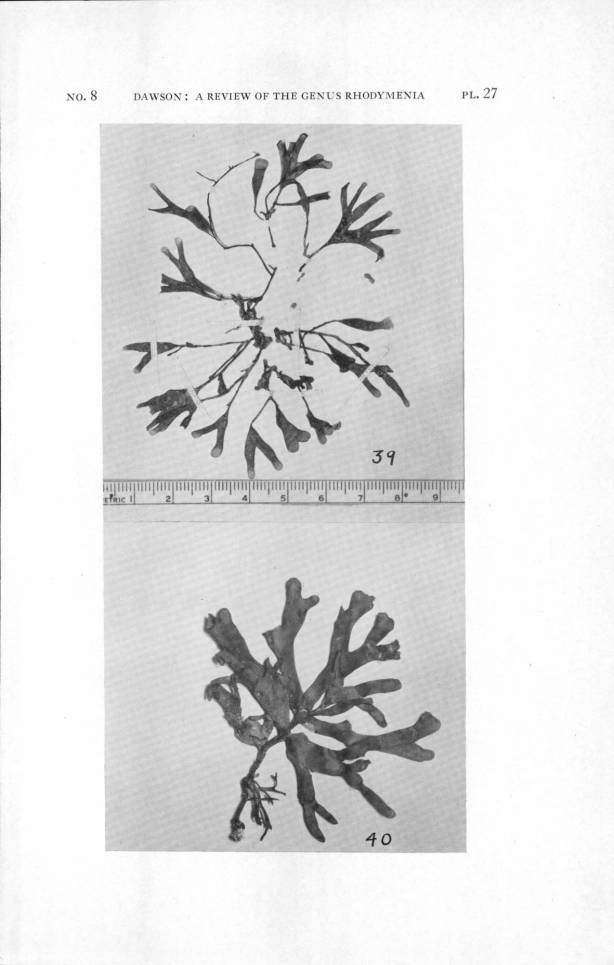

Scientific classification
- Domain: Eukaryota
- Supergroup: Archaeplastida
- Division: Rhodophyta
- Class: Florideophyceae
- Order: Rhodymeniales
- Family: Rhodymeniaceae
- Genus: Rhodymenia
- Species: R. leptophylla

Binomial name
- Rhodymenia leptophylla J. Agardh

Synonyms
- Rhodymenia leptophylloides

= Rhodymenia leptophylla =

Species of alga

Rhodymenia leptophylla is a species of marine red algae first described in 1878.
