= Rhodymenia novaehollandica =

Scientific classification
- Domain: Eukaryota
- Supergroup: Archaeplastida
- Division: Rhodophyta
- Class: Florideophyceae
- Order: Rhodymeniales
- Family: Rhodymeniaceae
- Genus: Rhodymenia
- Species: R. novaehollandica

Binomial name
- Rhodymenia novaehollandica G.W.Saunders

Species of alga

Rhodymenia novaehollandica is a species of marine red algae first described in 2010. In New Zealand it was previous known as Rhodymenia sonderi.
