= Alexander (1801 ship) =

History

United Kingdom
- Name: Alexander
- Owner: John Locke (or Lock); 1801-1802; W Beatson & Company; 1802-1803
- Builder: Henry Baldwin, Quebec
- Launched: 1801
- Fate: Condemned 1810

General characteristics
- Tons burthen: 274, 278, or 279, or 281 (bm)
- Length: 98 ft (30 m)
- Beam: 26 ft (7.9 m)
- Depth: 6 ft (1.8 m)
- Propulsion: Sail
- Complement: 24
- Armament: 1801:10 guns; 1806:12 × 6-pounder guns; 1808:2 × 18-pounder + 12 × 12-pounder guns, the latter "short guns of the New Construction"; 1810:12 × 6-pounder guns

Alexander was a sailing ship built by Henry Baldwin and launched in Quebec in 1801. She was registered in London in 1802. She sailed for the British East India Company carrying wheat to New South Wales for the government, before returning to Britain via China. She spent a few years trading with the West Indies before she traveled to New South Wales again, this time transporting convicts. On her return to Britain new owners returned her to trading with the West Indies, but she is no longer listed after 1810 and her ultimate fate is unknown.

== East Indiaman (1802-1803) ==
She was taken up for service with the British East India Company between 1802 and 1803. The Victualing Board chartered Alexander to carry 511,945 pounds (228.5 tons) of flour to New South Wales; the Bill of Lading was dated 5 March 1802.

Captain James Normand [sic] left England on 28 April 1802, bound for New South Wales and Bombay. Alexander reached Rio de Janeiro on 30 June, and Port Jackson on 16 October. The government sold some of her supplies (60 casks of flour and 25 casks of salt meat) to Nicolas Baudin to resupply his two French vessels then in port. The supplies permitted Naturaliste to return to France and Geographe to continue her explorations of the Australian coast.

A listing of vessel and arrivals and departures supports these dates and gives the name of her master as "Norman". However, it shows her as having delivered "prisoners", and having left for China. The standard history of convict ships to Australia does not show an Alexander delivering convicts in 1802.

She left Port Jackson on 3 January 1803, stopped at Colombo on 20 March, and reached Bombay on 27 April. From Bombay she reached St Helena on 5 October, and the Downs on 18 December. (Note: The records in the British Library appear to conflate this Alexander with Alexander, a French prize that later became a slave ship.)

On 4 January 1804 Captain Norman wrote a testimonial to the Commissioners of Longitude in support of an award for Thomas Earnshaw for his chronometer. Norman wrote that over the 13 months between leaving England and arriving in Bombay, the chronometer was never more than five miles off, and that from Bombay home it had altered trivially. (Note: The Commissioners awarded Earnshaw £2500 in 1805.)

== West Indies ==
Her owners then placed Alexander in the West Indies trade. Lloyd's Register continued to report on Alexander from 1804 to 1810.

Lloyd's Register	Master	Owner	Trade
1803	J. Norman	Beatson	London-Botany Bay
1804	J. Norman; J. Taylor	Beatson	London-Botany Bay; London-Jamaica
1805	J. Taylor	Beatson	London-Jamaica

== Convict transport ==
Lloyd's Register continued to show Alexander on the London-Jamaica trade, but this appears to be a case of the Register not receiving updated information. The entry in the Register of Shipping for 1806 is better.

Under the command of Richard Brooks, Alexander sailed from Portsmouth on 28 January 1806, with 42 female and 15 male convicts for the colony of New South Wales. She was part of a convoy under the escort of Porpoise that included the merchant transports (Lady Madeleine) Sinclair, Elizabeth, Justina, and the fellow convict transport Fortune. The vessels passed Madeira on 25 February and were reported all well on 5 March. Lady Madeleine Sinclair was also carrying Captain William Bligh, who was sailing to the colony to assume the governorship. Alexander underwent repairs at Rio after having run aground on a sand bank prior to reaching the port.

Alexander arrived at Port Jackson on 20 August. One male convict and a child died on the voyage. Alexander left Port Jackson on 10 November bound for England with a cargo of 300 tons of oil, 20 tons of fine salted skins, and 1500 furs. While exiting Port Jackson, she ran aground upon Bennelong Point and after heaving off without damage continued on her way.

When she returned to Britain, her owners appear to have sold her. Her new owners then returned her to the West Indies trade. According to Lloyd's Register, they may have increased her armament, perhaps fearing the more intense presence of privateers in that theatre. The information in the Register of Shipping shows no change.

Lloyd's Register	Master	Owner	Trade	Notes
1808	Watts	Wright & Co.	London-Jamaica	?×18-pounder + 12 × 12-pounder guns
1809	Watts	Wright & Co.	London-Dominica	2×18-pounder + 12 × 12-pounder guns
1810	Watts	Wright & Co.	London-Dominica	2×18-pounder + 12 × 12-pounder guns
1811				Not listed

Register of Shipping	Master	Owner	Trade	Notes
1806	J. Taylor; R. Brooks	Lock & Co.	London-Jamaica; London-Botany Bay	12 × 6-pounder guns
1810	Watts	Wright & Co.	London-Demerara	12 × 6-pounder guns

== Fate ==
Lloyd's Register does not list Alexander after 1810. The Register of Shipping for 1810 has the notation "condemned" by the entry for Alexander.

== Sources ==
- Bateson, Charles (1959). The Convict Ships. Brown, Son & Ferguson. OCLC 3778075.
- Hackman, Rowan (2001). Ships of the East India Company. Gravesend, Kent: World Ship Society. ISBN 0-905617-96-7.
- Marcil, Eileen Reid (1995). The Charley-Man: a history of wooden shipbuilding at Quebec 1763-1893. Kingston, Ontario: Quarry. ISBN 1-55082-093-1.
- Maskelyne, Nevil (1804). Arguments for giving a reward to Mr. Earnshaw, for his improvements on time-keepers, by the astronomer-royal volume 1.
