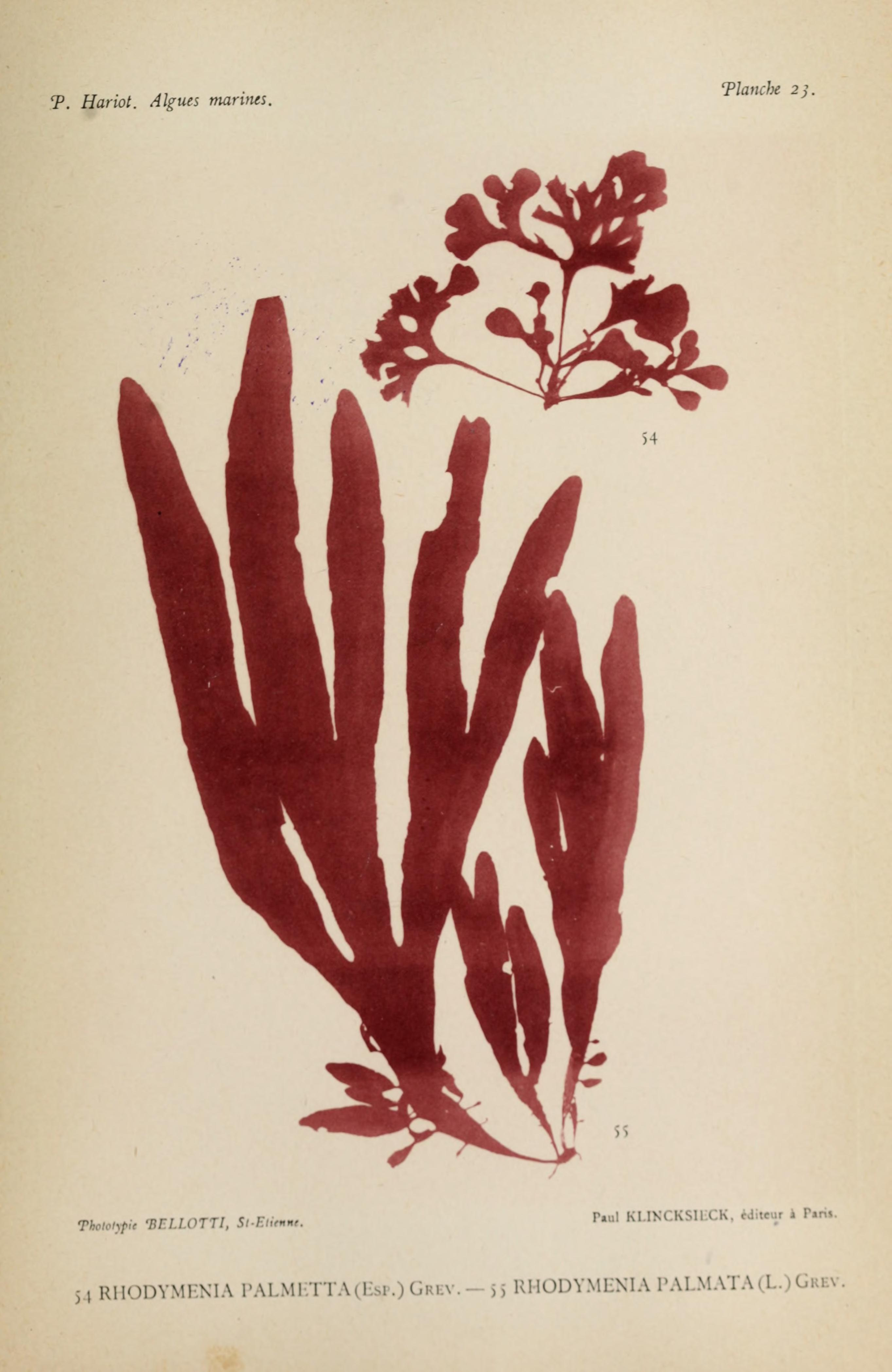
- Rhodymenia palmetta (top) and R. palmata

Scientific classification
- Clade: Archaeplastida
- Division: Rhodophyta
- Class: Florideophyceae
- Order: Rhodymeniales
- Family: Rhodymeniaceae
- Genus: Rhodymenia; Greville

Type species
- Rhodymenia palmetta (Stackhouse) Greville

= Rhodymenia =

Genus of algae

Rhodymenia is a genus of red algae, containing the following species:

- Rhodymenia acanthophora Greville
- Rhodymenia adnata Okamura
- Rhodymenia arborescens E. Y. Dawson
- Rhodymenia ardissonei (Kuntze) Feldmann
- Rhodymenia caespitosa P. J. L. Dangeard
- Rhodymenia californica Kylin
- Rhodymenia callophylloides Hollenberg & I. A. Abbott
- Rhodymenia capensis J. Agardh
- Rhodymenia caulescens (Kützing) A. J. K. Millar
- Rhodymenia cinnabarina J. Agardh
- Rhodymenia coacta Okamura & Segawa
- Rhodymenia coccocarpa (Montagne) M. J. Wynne
- Rhodymenia coespitosella L'Hardy-Halos
- Rhodymenia corallina (Bory de Saint-Vincent) Greville
- Rhodymenia crozetii Levring
- Rhodymenia dawsonii Taylor
- Rhodymenia decumbens W. R. Taylor
- Rhodymenia delicatula P. J. L. Dangeard
- Rhodymenia dichotoma J. D. Hooker & Harvey
- Rhodymenia dissecta Børgesen
- Rhodymenia divaricata E. Y. Dawson
- Rhodymenia erythraea Zanardini
- Rhodymenia eyreana Papenfuss
- Rhodymenia flabellifolia (Bory de Saint-Vincent) Montagne
- Rhodymenia gardneri (Setchell) Kylin
- Rhodymenia hainanensis B.-M. Xia & Y.-Q. Zhang
- Rhodymenia hancockii E. Y. Dawson
- Rhodymenia holmesii Ardissone
- Rhodymenia howeana E. Y. Dawson
- Rhodymenia indica Web. v. Bosse
- Rhodymenia intricata (Okamura) Okamura
- Rhodymenia javanica Sonder
- Rhodymenia lambertii (Turner) Greville ex J. D. Hooker & Harvey
- Rhodymenia lanceolata Harvey
- Rhodymenia leptofaucheoides P. Huvé & H. Huvé
- Rhodymenia leptophylla J. Agardh
- Rhodymenia ligulata Zanardini
- Rhodymenia linearis J. Agardh
- Rhodymenia liniformis Okamura
- Rhodymenia lobata E. Y. Dawson
- Rhodymenia multidigitata E. Y. Dawson, Acleto & Foldvik
- Rhodymenia natalensis Kylin
- Rhodymenia novaehollandica G. W. Saunders
- Rhodymenia novazelandica E. Y. Dawson
- Rhodymenia obtusa (Greville) Womersley
- Rhodymenia pacifica Kylin
- Rhodymenia palmetta (Stackhouse) Greville
- Rhodymenia palmipedata Dawson & Neushel
- Rhodymenia parva Yamada
- Rhodymenia peruviana J. Agardh
- Rhodymenia phylloïdes L'Hardy-Halos
- Rhodymenia prolificans Zanardini
- Rhodymenia prostrata Tanaka
- Rhodymenia pseudopalmata (J. V. Lamouroux) P. C. Silva
- Rhodymenia schmittii W. R. Taylor
- Rhodymenia setchellii Weber-van Bosse
- Rhodymenia skottsbergii E. Y. Dawson
- Rhodymenia stenoglossa J. Agardh
- Rhodymenia sympodiophyllum E. Y. Dawson & Neushul
- Rhodymenia variolosa J. D. Hooker & Harvey
- Rhodymenia wilsonis (Sonder) G. W. Saunders
