= Keelson =

Structural member in a boat or ship

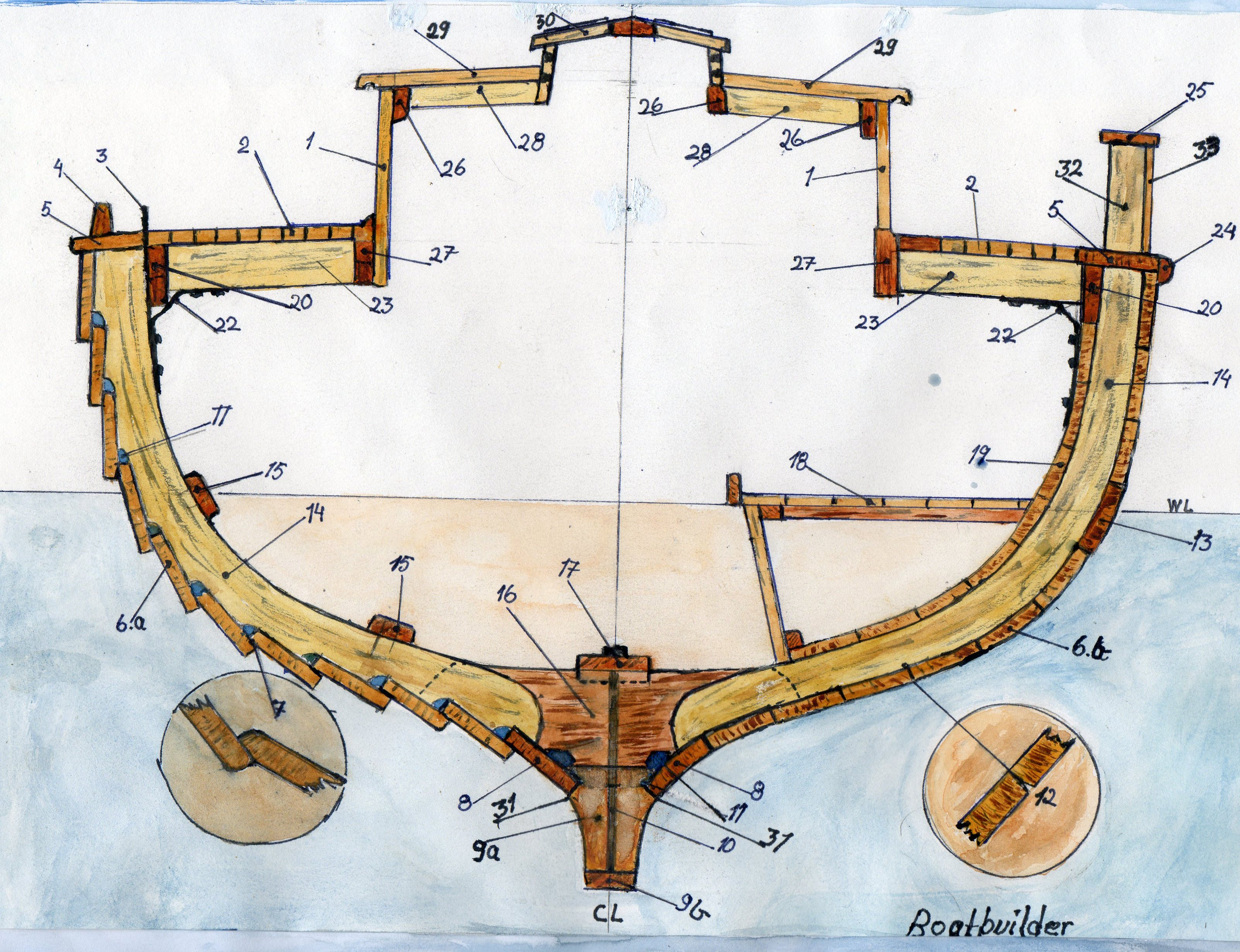
Kelson marked with 17

The keelson or kelson is a reinforcing structural member on top of the keel in the hull of a vessel. Originally used on wooden ships, in modern usage a keelson is any structural member used to strengthen the hull or to support any heavy weight.

Wooden vessels may feature both main keelsons and sister keelsons.

In part V of "Song of Myself", American poet Walt Whitman (1819–1892) uses the phrase: "And that a kelson of the creation is love" to imply that love is akin to a keelson, or backbone, that supports humanity.
