= Alexander (1799 ship) =

History

France, or Spain
- Launched: 1797
- Captured: circa 1799

Great Britain
- Acquired: 1799 by purchase of a prize
- Fate: Last listed in 1809

General characteristics
- Tons burthen: 327 (bm)
- Complement: 1799:25; 1801:30; 1804:45
- Armament: 1799:20 × 6-pounder guns; 1799:20 × 6-pounder guns + 2 × 18-pounder carronades; 1801:22 × 6&9-pounder cannons; 1804:22 × 6&12-pounder cannons

Alexander was launched in France or Spain in 1797, probably under another name, and taken in prize circa 1799, when she was lengthened and raised. She was registered at Liverpool in 1801, and proceeded to make six voyages as a slave ship in the triangular trade in enslaved people. She then sailed to Brazil and the West Indies and was last listed in 1809.

== Career ==
Alexander first appeared in Lloyd's Register (LR) in 1800.

Year	Master	Owner	Trade	Source
1800	Threlfall	Tetherton	Liverpool–Africa	LR; lengthened 1799

1st voyage transporting enslaved people (1799–1800): Captain Joseph Threlfall acquired a letter of marque on 8 October 1799, and sailed from Liverpool on 29 October 1799. In 1799, 156 vessels sailed from English ports, bound for the trade in enslaved people; 134 of these vessels sailed from Liverpool.

Alexander acquired captives at Bonny and arrived at Kingston, Jamaica on 8 July 1800, with 310 captives. She left Kingston on 2 or 6 September, in company with Vanguard and some other vessels sailing to Liverpool, and arrived back at Liverpool on 3 November. She had left Liverpool with 51 crew members and she suffered 12 crew deaths on her voyage.

2nd voyage transporting enslaved people (1801–1802): Captain John Ainsworth acquired a letter of marque on 6 August 1801, and sailed from Liverpool on 5 September 1801. In 1801, 147 vessels sailed from English ports, bound for the trade in enslaved people; 122 of these vessels sailed from Liverpool.

Alexander acquired captives at Bonny and arrived at Grenada on 3 April 1802, with 322 captives. She may also have delivered some at Suriname. She sailed from Grenada or Suriname via Antigua, and arrived back at Liverpool on 15 June. She had sailed from Liverpool with 48 crew members and had suffered four crew deaths on her voyage.

3rd voyage transporting enslaved people (1802–1803): Captain Ainsworth sailed from Liverpool on 18 September 1802. In 1802, 155 vessels sailed from English ports, bound for the trade in enslaved people; 122 of these vessels sailed from Liverpool.

Alexander acquired captives on the Windward Coast, in the area between Rio Nuñez and the Assini River. She arrived at Demerara on 1 March 1803. She returned to Liverpool on 31 May. She had left Liverpool with 37 crew members and she suffered four crew deaths on the voyage.

Year	Master	Owner	Trade	Source & notes
1804	Ainsworth; Ward	Benson	Liverpool–Africa	LR; lengthened 1799

4th voyage transporting enslaved people (1804–1805): Captain Henry Ward acquired a letter of marque on 14 February 1804, and sailed from Liverpool on 7 April 1804. In 1804, 147 vessels sailed from English ports, bound for the trade in enslaved people; 126 of these vessels sailed from Liverpool.

Alexander started acquiring captives on the Gold Coast on 27 May. She arrived at Demerara on 23 November with 338 captives. She left Demerara on 26 January 1805, and arrived back at Liverpool on 13 April. She had left with 52 crew members, and eight had died on the voyage.

5th voyage transporting enslaved people (1805–1806): Captain Ward sailed from Liverpool on 12 August 1805. Alexander acquired captives on the Gold Coast and left Africa on 8 February 1806. She arrived Kingston on 22 March 1806, with 336 captives. She left Kingston on 2 May, and arrived at Liverpool on 11 June. She had left Liverpool with 52 crew embers and had suffered eight crew deaths on the voyage.

6th voyage transporting enslaved people (1807–1808): Captain Ward sailed from Liverpool in February 1807. As she left, on 12 February another vessel ran afoul of her in the Mersey, causing some damage, carrying away all of her upper work on the starboard side of her quarterdeck.

Alexander acquired captives on the Gold Coast and arrived at Kingston on 30 November. On 25 November, a French privateer captured Lucy, an American vessel sailing from Curacoa to Philadelphia. Alexander recaptured Lucy, which then arrived in Jamaica. Alexander departed Kingston on 11 April 1808, and arrived back at Liverpool on 29 May. She had left Liverpool with 50 crew members and she suffered eight crew deaths on the voyage.

The Slave Trade Act 1807 made it illegal for British vessels to engage in the slave trade. The Act took effect on 1 May 1807, so Alexander's last voyage was still legal as she had received clearance to sail outward bound in February.

Year	Master	Owner	Trade	Source & notes
1808	H.Ward	Benson &. Co.	Liverpool–Africa; Liverpool–Brazils	LR; lengthened 1799
1809	H.Ward	Barker & Co.	Liverpool–West Indies	Register of Shipping; good repair 1808

== Fate ==
Alexander, Ward, master, was last listed in 1808 in LR, and in 1809 in the Register of Shipping.
