= Rhodymenia cinnabarina =

Scientific classification
- Clade: Archaeplastida
- Division: Rhodophyta
- Class: Florideophyceae
- Order: Rhodymeniales
- Family: Rhodymeniaceae
- Genus: Rhodymenia
- Species: R. cinnabarina

Binomial name
- Rhodymenia cinnabarina J. Agardh

Species of alga

Rhodymenia cinnabarina is a species of red algae first described in 1841.
