= Alexander (1812 ship) =

History

United Kingdom
- Builder: Michael Smith at Howrah, Calcutta
- Launched: 1812
- Fate: Lost 1835, or 1837

General characteristics
- Tons burthen: 49288/94, or 534 (bm)

Alexander was a country ship (i.e., she traded east of the Cape of Good Hope) launched in 1812. She was lost in 1835.

== Career ==
Although Alexander appears in a compendium of vessels that traded between the United Kingdom and India under a license from the British East India Company, there is no record of such a voyage or voyages in Lloyd's Register. She did appear in various issues of the East-India Register and Directory.

Year	Master	Owner
1819	B.Roger	Sayed Saduck
1824	Robert Dickie	J.Gilmore & Co.
1827	W.Clark	J.Gilmore & Co.
1828	J.J.Denham	Rustumjee
1829	NA	NA

== Fate ==
Alexander was lost in the China Sea in 1835. Another source reports that a country ship named Alexander was lost in 1837 while sailing from China to Singapore.
