= Alexander (1803 Liverpool) =

History

British East India Company
- Name: Alexander
- Owner: Voyage 1: George F. Clay; Voyages 2&3: Felix Clay; Voyage 4: John Hotson; Voyages 5&6:James Mangles; Voyage 7: Robert Mangles
- Builder: Grayson, Liverpool
- Launched: 22 April 1803
- Fate: Sold 1817

General characteristics
- Type: East Indiaman
- Tons burthen: 614, or 61448/94 (bm)
- Length: Overall: 128 ft (39.0 m); Keel: 102 ft 5 in (31.2 m)
- Beam: 33 ft 7 in (10.2 m)
- Depth of hold: 12 ft 10 in (3.9 m)
- Sail plan: Full-rigged ship
- Complement: 55–65 men
- Armament: 18 × 12-pounder carronades initially; later 18 × 12-pounder guns

Alexander was launched in 1803 at Liverpool, but contracted to the Honourable East India Company (EIC), which took her measurements in 1804, and which rated her as an East Indiaman of "600 tons". She made seven trips for the company before she was sold; during her service she was variously referred to as an "extra" ship, one that the Company chartered for particular voyages, and as a "regular" ship, i.e., one that the Company held on long-term contract. When she sailed during wartime she sailed under letters of marque, which authorised her to use her armaments offensively against enemy, i.e., French vessels, and not just defensively. She was sold in 1817.

== Charter ==
On 14 March 1804, the EIC accepted George Clay's tender of Alexander for six voyages as an extra ship. The rate was £13 9s per ton peacetime freight and £9 19s per ton for contingencies.

== Voyage #1 (1804–05) ==
Captain John Robinson Francklin was issued a letter of marque on 30 May 1804. He sailed her for Bengal, leaving Portsmouth on 10 July. She reached Funchal on 23 July, and Diamond Harbour on 3 December. On her return leg she reached Saugor in the Hooghly River on 13 January 1805. On 2 February she left there, reaching Madras ten days later. By 20 June she was at St Helena, and by 15 September she had returned to Long Reach. East Indiaman traditionally stopped there to lighten their loads before sailing up the Thames to moorings at Blackwall.

== Voyage #2 (1806–07) ==
Francklin was again her captain and he sailed Alexander to Bengal and Madras, leaving Portsmouth on 30 March 1806. By 22 April he was at Porto Praya, and by 26 August Alexander had reached Madras. On 10 September she reached Masulipatam and eight days later she was at Diamond Harbour. On the return leg Alexander was at Saugor on 23 February 1807. From there she reached St Helena on 13 June and Gravesend on 9 September.

== Voyage #3 (1808–09) ==
Captain Thomas Price commanded Alexander for her third voyage. His letter of marque was dated 7 March 1808. Alexander left Portsmouth on 15 April for Bombay and arrived at Madeira on 1 May. She then arrived at Bombay on 13 September, and left on 4 January 1809. She arrived at St Helena on 4 March and Woolwich on 21 May.

== Voyage #4 (1810–11) ==
Captain William Younghusband took command of Alexander for her fourth voyage, this one to Bombay and Madras. His letter of marque was dated 30 January 1810. He left Portsmouth on 14 March 1810 and arrived at Bombay on 2 July. From there he sailed to Madras, where he arrived on 25 August. From Madras Alexander sailed to Rodrigues, in the Mascarene Islands. Next, she visited Mauritius, arriving on 29 December. She then sailed to Acheh, arriving there on 27 July 1811, before returning to Madras on 14 March. By 13 July Alexander was at the Cape of Good Hope. A little over a month later she was at St Helena (19 August), and by 21 November she was back at Blackwall Yard.

== Voyage #5 (1812–13) ==
Captain Charles Hazell Newell took command for this voyage, which was to be to Bengal and Benkulen. Although Britain was still at war with France, and would shortly be at war with the United States, Alexander sailed without a letter of marque. She left Portsmouth on 4 June 1812, reaching Madeira on 18 June, and Calcutta on 28 November. On 19 January 1813 she was at Kedgeree, and by 4 March at Benkulen. From there she sailed back to St Helena, which she reached on 31 May. By 14 August Alexander was at Blackwall.

== Voyage #6 (1814–15) ==
Newell remained captain of Alexander for this voyage to Madras and Bengal, and again sailed without a letter of marque, by this time the war with France being almost over. He left Portsmouth on 9 April 1814, and reached Madeira on 26 April. Alexander reached Madras on 19 September, and by October was at Bengal. On her return voyage she stopped at Point de Galle, where on 18 January 1815 a fire broke out on another Indiaman, the Bengal, which was destroyed. Newell died while helping to fight the fire, with the result that Alexander sailed home under the command of her first lieutenant, Henry Cobb. She reached Britain on 25 June 1815.

== Voyage #7 (1816–17) ==
On 2 February 1816, the EIC accepted Robert Mangles's tender of Alexander for one voyage at a rate of £25 19s per ton.

Captain Henry Cobb was captain for this, Alexander's last voyage. He left The Downs for Bombay on 19 May 1816 and reached Madeira on 31 May. He arrived at Bombay on 23 September, before leaving on 7 December. One week later Alexander arrived at Tellicherry. From there she sailed to Cochin, where she arrived on 30 December. She reached the Cape of Good Hope on 18 February 1817, St Helena on 14 March, and Blackwall on 29 May. (Note: Cobb remained in the HEIC's service and was captain of Kent for three voyages, including her last when she caught fire and was lost with great loss of life, in 1825 in the Bay of Biscay.)

== Fate ==
Apparently Alexander was sold in 1817 on the condition she be used as a hulk or broken up.
