= Alexander (1794 ship) =

History

France
- Name: Unknown
- Launched: 1791
- Captured: Captured 1793

Great Britain
- Name: Alexander
- Owner: Connick & Co.; Smith & Co. (Note: Smith & Co. consisted of Bryan Smith, John Titherington, William Cocherall, John Parry, and Edward Bennett.)
- Acquired: By purchase of a prize
- Fate: Last listed in 1811

General characteristics
- Tons burthen: 357, or 377-383, or 383 (bm)
- Complement: 40-50
- Armament: 1795:12 × 4-pounder guns; 1798:24 × 6&9-pounder guns; 1805:20 × 9-pounder guns; 1806:18 × 9-pounder guns; 1809:20 × 6-pounder guns

Alexander, was built in France in 1791, possibly under a different name. She was taken as a prize and her new owners renamed her Alexander. She made one voyage for the British East India Company (EIC), and then became a slave ship, making four voyages between 1798 and 1807 in the triangular trade in enslaved people. After 1807 she sailed between Liverpool and Demerara. She is last listed in 1811.

== Career ==
It is currently not possible to identify Alexander's name before she became an English prize.

Alexander appeared in Lloyd's Register for 1794 with Js. Boulton, master, Thompson, owner, and trade London-Ostend. Her burthen is given as 257 tons (bm), but that was corrected to 357 tons the next year.

In 1796, Lloyd's Register showed a change in ownership to Connick & Co. Modifications to the entry showed the master as changing to W. Wallace, and her trade to London-Botany Bay.

However, Alexander's next voyage was for the EIC as an "extra ship", i.e., under contract. Captain William Wallace left Portsmouth 12 August 1796, bound for Bengal. Alexander reached Saugor on 23 January 1797, and Calcutta six days later. She left Culpee on 27 March 1797. She reached the Cape on 12 July, St Helena on 17 September, and Long Reach on 18 December. (Note: The British Library database conflates two voyages by vessels named Alexander. This voyage by this vessel, and a later voyage by Alexander)

Alexander then was sold into the Africa and West Indies slave trade. Lloyd's Register (LR) for 1798 shows Alexander, French-built in 1791, of 357 tons, with master Wallace and owner Connick, as being on the London-East Indies trade. A later amendment to the entry shows a new master, W. Cockerill, a new owner, B. Smith, and a new trade, Liverpool-Africa.

== 1st voyage transporting enslaved people (1798–1800) ==
Lloyd's Register for 1799 gave the names of her master and her owner as William Cockerel, and Smith & Co. Cockerel had received a letter of marque for Alexander on 6 September 1798.

A database of slave voyages shows Alexander, under the command of William Cockerell, sailing to West Central Africa and St Helena. She left Liverpool on 23 October 1798. In 1798, 160 vessels left British ports to engage in the transportation of enslaved people; 149 of these vessels sailed from Liverpool.

Alexander arrived at Kingston, Jamaica, on 12 September 1799, with 516 captives. She left Kingston on 30 October and arrived back at Liverpool on 16 January 1800. She had left Liverpool with 49 crew members and had four deaths en route.

A later amendment to the entry for Alexander in the 1800 issue of Lloyd's Register shows a change of master to G. Farquhar. George Farquhar received a letter of marque on 22 April 1800. He also became a partner in Smith & Co.

== 2nd voyage transporting enslaved people (1800–1801) ==
Farquhar sailed Alexander to West Central Africa and St Helena, leaving Liverpool on 21 May 1800. He gathered slaves at Anomabu and the Rio Dande. Alexander arrived at Kingston on 29 April 1801. She arrived with 347 slaves. She left Kingston on 22 July and arrived back at Liverpool on 26 September. She had left with 54 crew members and had 40 when she arrived at Kingston. She had 11 crew men die on the voyage.

It is not clear what Alexander did between 1801 and 1805. Both Lloyd's Register and the Register of Shipping carry stale information.

== 3rd voyage transporting enslaved people (1805) ==
An amendment to the entry for Alexander in the 1805 issue of Lloyd's Register showed a change of master to V. May, and a change of owner to "Ti[undeceipherable]". Vincent May received a letter of marque on 19 October 1805. The database of slave voyages shows the master as Vincent May and the owner as John Titherington. Alexander sailed from Liverpool on 9 October 1805, but returned without having gathered any slaves. It is not clear why May aborted the voyage.

== 4th voyage transporting enslaved people (1807-1808) ==
Lloyd's Register for 1807 showed the owner as Titherton; an amendment to the entry gave a new master by the name of Smith. John Smith received a letter of marque on 13 December 1806. The database of slave voyages has the master's name as John Smith, and the voyage as being from the Bight of Biafra and Gulf of Guinea islands to Jamaica. Captain Smith departed Liverpool on 1 January 1807 and arrived at Kingston on 12 June. Alexander landed 296 captives. She left Kingston on 29 September and arrived back at Liverpool on 1 January 1808. She had sailed from Liverpool with 45 men; ten died during the voyage.

The entries in Lloyd's Register did not change until 1809, even though the Slave Trade Act 1807 had abolished the trade for British vessels. An amendment to the entry in the 1809 Lloyd's Register showed a change of master to J. Towers. However, this appears to be an error. Alexander, French prize, launched 1791 and of 383 tons (bm), appeared in the Register of Shipping in 1809 with J. Bailey, master, Fotheringham, owner, and trade Liverpool—Demerara.

== Fate ==
The entries in the Register of Shipping continued unchanged through 1811. Alexander was no longer listed in 1812.
