= HMS Alexander =

Seven ships of the Royal Navy have borne the name HMS Alexander:

- HMS Alexander (1688) was a 12-gun fireship captured in 1688 and accidentally burned in 1689.
- HMS Alexander (1778) was a 74-gun third-rate launched in 1778. She was captured by the French in 1794 but was recaptured in 1795. She was hulked in 1805 and was broken up in 1819.
- HMS Alexander (1788) was a store ship in service between 1788 and 1790.
- HMS Alexander (1796) was a 6-gun schooner purchased in 1796 and sold in 1802.
- HMS Alexander (1806) was an 80-gun second-rate captured from the French in 1806. She was used for harbour service from 1811 and sold in 1822.
- HMS Alexander was a former Imperial Russian icebreaker, previously named Saint Alexander Nevsky. She was seized after the October Revolution in 1917 and commissioned as HMS Alexander. She was returned to the White Russians in 1919. She was renamed Lenin by the Soviet Union.

Civilian vessels named Alexander in naval service:

- Alexander (1813 ship), of 252 tons (bm), was built in Aberdeen. The Admiralty hired her for a discovery expedition between 1818 and 1819. She sailed with another hired vessel, Isabella.
- Alexander (1863) was an iron screw transport ship built in Renfrew. She was manned by the Royal Navy and operated as a supply ship during the New Zealand Wars. In 1865 she was wrecked near Taranaki.
