= Alexander (1807 ship) =

English ship

History

United Kingdom
- Name: Alexander
- Launched: 1807, Selby
- Fate: Wrecked 19 May 1820

General characteristics
- Tons burthen: 364 (bm)
- Armament: 1807: 2 × 9-pounder guns + 14 × 12-pounder carronades; 1810: 8 guns; 1814: 8 × 12-pounder carronades

Alexander was launched in 1800 at Hull, or actually further up the River Ouse at Selby, and probably under another name. From 1807 on she was a West Indiaman. She was wrecked on 19 May 1820 while sailing to Honduras.

== Career ==
Alexander first entered Lloyd's Register (LR) in 1807.

Year	Master	Owner	Trade	Source
1807	Atkins	Kennion & Co.	London–Jamaica	LR

Lloyd's List reported in August 1807 that Alexander, Atkins, master, had recaptured the sloop Albion, of Bermuda, and taken her into Jamaica. Albion had been sailing from Havana to Savannah with a cargo of coffee when a French privateer had captured her.

Year	Master	Owner	Trade	Source & notes
1810	Atkins; G.Ford	Kennion & Co.	London–Jamaica	LR
1812	Ford; T.Hard	Kenion & Co.	London–Jamaica	LR; new topsides and large repair 1811
1813	T.Hard; G.Denning	Kenion & Co.	London transport	LR; new topsides and large repair 1811
1814	Ford; Young	P.Kennion	London–Jamaica; London transport	Register of Shipping; new topsides and large repair 1811
1816	Young	P.Kennion	London–Jamaica; London transport	Register of Shipping; new topsides and large repair 1811
1818	Milne(or Millina); Carpenter	P.Kenion "Poingdstre"	London–Jamaica; London–Honduras	LR; new topsides and large repair 1811
1820	Carpenter	"Poingdstre"	London–Yucatan	LR; new topsides and large repair 1811 & new keel 1819

== Loss ==
Alexander, Carpenter, master, was wrecked on 19 May 1820 in the Southern Four Keys (Lighthouse Reef). She was on a voyage from London to Jamaica and British Honduras. Most of her cargo was saved, but in a damaged state.
