= Alexander (1811 ship) =

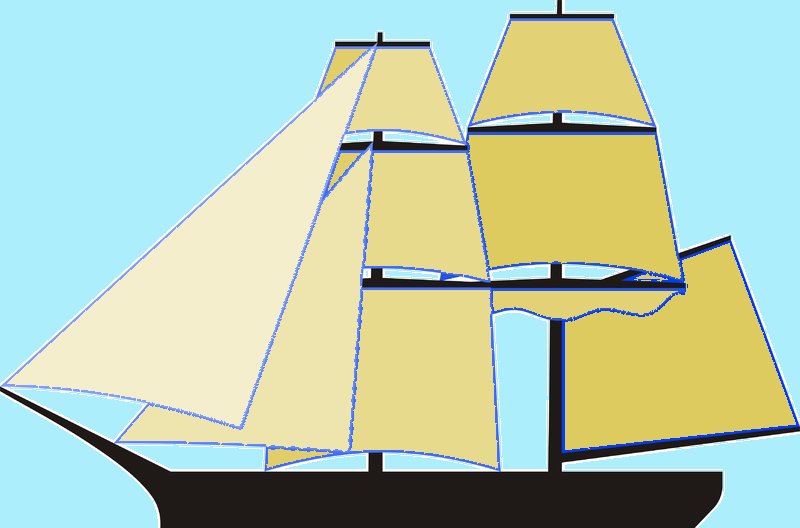
- Configuration of typical brig-sloop

History

United States
- Name: Alexander
- Launched: 1811, United States
- Captured: Circa 1814

United Kingdom
- Name: Alexander
- Acquired: Circa 1814 by purchase of a prize
- Fate: Last full listing in 1833

General characteristics
- Type: Brig
- Tons burthen: 227, or 229 (bm)
- Propulsion: Sail

Alexander was built in the United States in 1811 and captured as a prize during the War of 1812, or built in 1813 in Halifax. She first appeared in Lloyd's Register for 1815 with Hamilton, master, M'Dowell, owner, and trade Greenock-Newfoundland.

Under the command of William Hamilton, she sailed from Ireland on 4 November 1815, and arrived at Port Jackson on 4 April 1816. She transported 84 female convicts, three of whom died on the voyage.

Alexander left Port Jackson on 23 June bound for England.

Year	Master	Owner	Trade	Source & notes
1816	Hamilton	M'Dowell	Cork	LR
1820	Hamilton	M'Dowell	Cork	LR

On 4 November 1821 Alexander, Fryer, master, arrived at Liverpool from Demerara. She was on shore at Bootle Bay. By 8 November she had been gotten off.

Year	Master	Owner	Trade	Source & notes
1821	Hamilton; W.Fryer	M'Dowell	Cork; Liverpool–Demerara	LR
1827	W.Fryer; W.Tyron	Robinson; T.Ronaldson	Liverpool–Demerara	LR; damages and large repair 1822
1830	W.Fryer	Robinson	Liverpool–Maranhão	LR; large repair 1822
1831	W.Fryer; J.Green	Robinson	Liverpool–Maranhão	LR; large repair 1822, copper and damages repaired 1831

In 1831 Alexander sailed to Van Diemen's Land and New South Wales. In 1833 she sailed from New South Wales to New Zealand. Later, she sailed to Trinidad.

Year	Master	Owner	Trade	Source & notes
1833	J.Green	Walkinshaw	Liverpool–New South Wales	LR; large repair 1822 & damages repaired 1831

The volume of Lloyd's Register for 1833 has the first mention of Alexander being of 229 tons (bm), and having been launched in 1813 at Halifax, Nova Scotia. (This may have been the source of the information in Hackman.) Subsequent volumes to 1839 carry only minimal information and there is no ship arrival and departure data for Alexander, Green, master, after mid-1833.

== See also ==
- List of ships captured in the 19th century
- Bibliography of early American naval history
