= Robbins Island (Tasmania) =

Island in Bass Strait off the coast of Tasmania

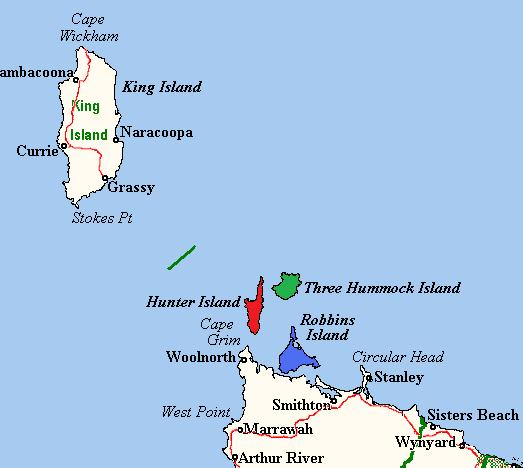
- Robbins Island shown in blue

- Location of Robbins Island in the Bass Strait
- Etymology: Charles Robbins

Geography
- Location: Bass Strait
- Coordinates: 40°41′24″S 144°54′36″E
- Area: 9,900 ha (24,000 acres)
- Area rank: 7th in Tasmania

Administration
- Australia
- State: Tasmania
- LGA: Circular Head Council

Additional information
- Time zone: AEST (UTC+10)
  - Summer (DST): AEDT (UTC+11)
- Privately-owned

Robbins Island is a 9,900-hectare (24,000-acre) island located in Bass Strait, lying off the northwest coast of Tasmania, Australia. The island, separated from the Tasmanian mainland by a highly tidal area known as Robbins Passage, lies south to the adjacent Walker Island.

Robbins Island is the seventh largest island of Tasmania and is the largest freehold island in Tasmania. Over the years Robbins Island has changed ownership and to this day remains privately owned.

== History ==
The island was part of the territory of the indigenous North West tribe spanning from Table Cape to the western side of Macquarie Harbour, where in particular, the Parperloihener band resided on Robbins Island prior to European colonisation. Western Tasmanian languages were spoken by Tasmanian Aborigines in the area but became extinct during the 19th century.

On 23 November 1802, Charles Robbins, first mate of Buffalo was sent in Cumberland, by Governor King to dissuade the French commodore Nicholas Baudin, with his two ships Géographe and Naturaliste from colonising Van Diemen's Land.

Baudin had revealed French plans to colonise Van Diemen's Land when drunk in a farewell party organised by the Governor, after sailing into Port Jackson where his crew were treated back to health from scurvy. Governor King would not accept French occupation of Van Diemen's Land and chartered the schooner Cumberland from which, on 13 December 1802, Robbins successfully persuaded Baudin to abandon French settlement of Van Diemen's Land. The schooner was chartered as larger ships were away and used for other maritime activities. From there along with Charles Grimes, Robbins sailed to Port Phillip, and actively explored the Yarra River in 1803 before returning to Port Jackson. It was during a subsequent trip to retrieve two Spanish ships which had been captured by a NSW trader's privateering expedition and hidden off the coast of Deal Island that in 1804 Robbins sighted Robbins island, which is named after him.

In 1826, following the English occupation of Tasmania, the Van Diemen's Land Company was set up at Stanley. This company was formed in England by London-based businessmen, who wanted to utilise land in Tasmania to create a wool industry to supply the British textile industry, which intention was facilitated by William Sorell's account to the Colonial Office that the Tasmanian colony was desperate for capital. The Van Diemen's Land Company Act was passed transferring possession of 250,000 acres (100,000 ha) of Crown land to freehold status or private ownership and included Robbins Island. A series of disputes during the period of 1820 to 1840, between European settlers and the North West tribe, in which Van Diemen's Land Company chief agent Edward Curr authorised the use of force if 'required', escalated into battles which became violent and bloody, notably including the infamous Cape Grim massacre. This culminated in an attempted genocide that is now known as the Black War. In 1835 under George Robinson, almost all Indigenous people from the Tasmanian mainland, including the Parperloihener band from Robbins Island, were removed and transported to a reserve on Flinders Island.

David Howie began leasing part of the island for farming purposes in 1850.

== Topography and fauna ==
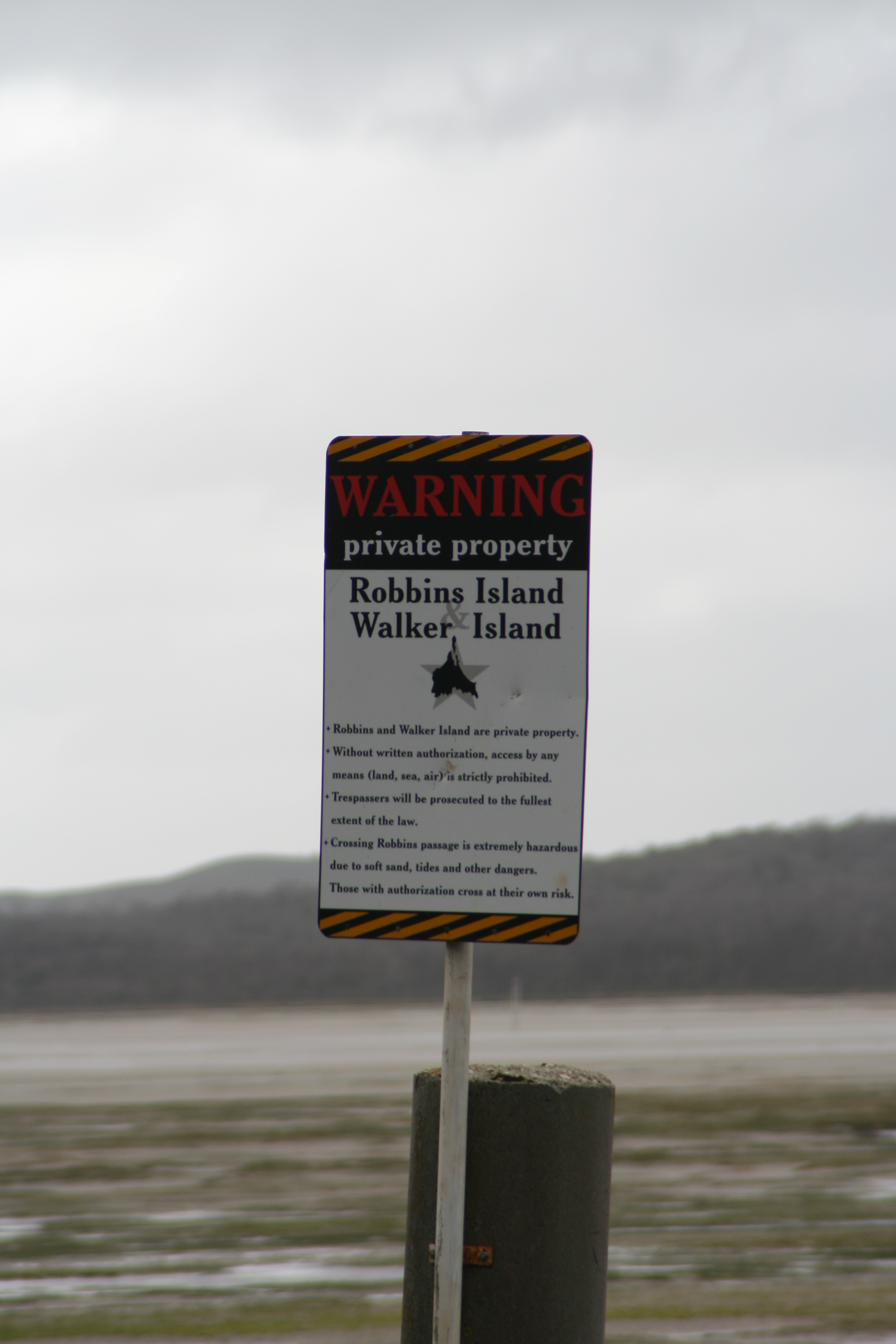
Sign at crossing to Robbins Island from Tasmanian mainland.

The island has a number of topographical features which include:

- Cape Elie, the most easterly point of the island.
- Guyton Point, located on northeastern area of the island.
- Mosquito Inlet is an estuary northwest of the island, having an area of 674 hectares (1,670 acres), where four bird species, the eastern curlew, masked lapwing, pied oystercatcher and sooty oystercatcher, roost.
- Five Islets, located northwest of the island, where the fairy tern and pied oystercatcher permanently nest, along with migratory birds great knot, red knot, bar-tailed godwit, grey plover, lesser sand plover, common greenshank, red-necked stint, Terek sandpiper and ruddy turnstone can be found.
- Bird Point, also located northwest of Robbins Island where a number of birds species permanently roost in the area. They include: fairy terns, little terns, Caspian terns, crested terns, pied oystercatchers and sooty oystercatchers. Many species of migratory birds come to nest here and include grey-tailed tattlers, great knots, lesser sand plovers, masked lapwings, Pacific golden plovers, red knots, red-capped plovers, red-necked stints, ruddy turnstones, sanderlings, waders, double-banded plovers, curlew sandpipers, common greenshanks, bar-tailed godwit and hooded plovers.

== Current developments ==
The island was used by livestock to graze on, primarily for wool production before the 1850s. William B. Reid leased the island for 43 years commencing in 1873, where native animals on the land were used as wild game, while farming was carried out and dairy products were made. Bill and Norah Holyman, of the Holyman family, then bought the island in 1916 using it for sheep husbandry, selling off the island in 1958. In 1961, H. E. Hammond was the owner of the island, where it remains in family ownership today. His descendants, Keith and John Hammond currently produce on Robbins Island wagyū beef, which is exported to Japan. Commercial aquaculture industry from Circular Head presently harvest rock lobster and abalone in waters around the island. A proposed wind farm on the island was expected to be fully operational by 2014; yet by 2016 it had not been constructed. A proposed mega wind farm application was submitted by UPC AC in January 2022, and approved in August 2025.

== See also ==
- List of islands of Tasmania
