= Lord Melville (1803 EIC ship) =

United Kingdom
- Name: Lord Melville
- Owner: Henry Bonham
- Builder: Dudman, Deptford
- Launched: 9 March 1803
- Fate: Sold for a hulk in 1817

General characteristics
- Tons burthen: 818, 871, 871 33/94 (bm)
- Length: Overall:146 ft 2 in (44.6 m); Keel:118 ft 8 1/2 in (36.2 m)
- Beam: 36 ft 0 in (11.0 m)
- Depth of hold: 14 ft 10 in (4.5 m)
- Complement: 1803:99; 1808:195; 1811:105
- Armament: 1803: 26 ×18-pounder guns; 1808: 30 ×18-pounder guns; 1811: 30 ×18-pounder guns
- Notes: Three decks

Lord Melville was launched in 1803 as an East Indiaman for the British East India Company (EIC). She made six voyages for the company before she was sold for a hulk in 1817.

== Career ==
On 28 August 1801, before Lord Melville was built, the EIC agreed with Robert Charnock to engage her for six voyages. The peacetime rate was £17 9s per ton with kentledge, and £19 per ton without kentledge. On her first voyage she would also receive an allowance for building of £6 6s per ton.

EIC voyage #1 (1803–1805): Captain Charles Lennox acquired a letter of marque on 27 May 1803. He sailed from Portsmouth on 30 June, bound for Bengal. Lord Melville was at Rio de Janeiro on 16 September.

Lord Melville, Earl Spencer, Princess Mary, Northampton, Anna, Ann, Glory, and Essex left Rio on 13 October. They were in company with the 74-gun third rate ships of the line HMS Albion, HMS Sceptre, and HMS Russell, and the fourth rate HMS Grampus. Three days later Albion and Sceptre separated from the rest of the ships.

Lord Melville arrived at Diamond Harbour on 12 February 1804. She was at Saugor on 24 April. Homeward bound, she was at Madras on 16 August and reached St Helena on 31 December. She arrived at the Downs on 20 March 1805.

EIC voyage #2 (1806–1808): Captain Lennox sailed from Portsmouth on 30 March 1806, bound for Madras and Bengal in a convoy that included Asia, Lady Burges, Lord Nelson, Sovereign, and Walthamstow, and that was under the escort of HMS Leopard.

During the night of 20 April Lady Burges wrecked on a reef off Boa Vista, Cape Verde. Boats from the convoy were able to rescue 150 of the 184 people on board; 34 drowned.

Lord Melville reached Madras on 26 August, and arrived at Diamond Harbour on 30 October and Kidderpore on 14 November. She then sailed to Penang and back. She was at Saugor on 26 February 1807 and reached Penang on 8 April. She was back at Diamond Harbour on 25 June. She was at Saugor on 21 August, Madras on 9 October, and the Cape of Good Hope on 30 December. She reached St Helena on 1 January 1808, and arrived at the Downs on 4 April.

EIC voyage #3 (1809–1810): Captain John Nelson Whyte acquired a letter of marque on 5 December 1808. He sailed from Portsmouth on 22 February 1809, bound for Madras and Bengal. Lord Melville was at Madras on 3 July, and arrived at Diamond Harbour on 19 July. Homeward bound, she was at Saugor on 25 October, Madras on 5 February 1810, Point de Galle on 18 February, and St Helena on 3 May. She arrived back at The Downs on 6 July.

EIC voyage #4 (1811–1812): Captain James George Crabb acquired a letter of marque on 15 March 1811. He sailed from Torbay on 12 May, bound for Madras and Bengal. Lord Melville reached Madras on 10 September, and arrived at Diamond Harbour on 12 October. Homeward bound, she was at Saugor on 26 November. On 18 January 1812 she was at Masulipatam and Madras on 25 January. She reached St Helena on 11 May and arrived at the Downs on 21 July.

EIC voyage #5 (1813–1814): Captain Crabb sailed from Torbay on 25 Mar 1813, bound for Madras and Bengal. Lord Melville was at Teneriffe on 11 April, and Johanna on 14 July. She reached Madras on 9 August and Masulipatam on 27 August. She arrived at Diamond Harbour on 9 September, and Calcutta on 11 November. Homeward bound she was at Saugor on 7 December, Madras on 25 January 1814, Colombo on 14 February, and the Cape on 25 April. She reached st Helena on 19 May and arrived at The Downs on 6 August.

EIC voyage #6 (1815–1816): Captain Crabb sailed from The Downs on 3 Apr 1815 bound for Madras and Bengal. Lord Melville was at Madras on 21 July, Masulipatam on 14 August, and Diamond Harbour on 22 August. Homeward bound, she was at Saugor on 9 November, Madras on 6 February 1816, and the Cape on 18 April. She reached St Helena on 9 May, and Ascension Island on 20 May. She arrived at The Downs on 2 July.

== Fate ==
Lord Melville was sold in 1817 as a hulk.
