= List of vessels of the Bengal Pilot Service to 1834 =

The Bengal Pilot Service (BPS) was an arm of the British East India Company (EIC). Its pilot boats were responsible for guiding East Indiamen, and other vessels, up and down the Hooghly River between Calcutta and the sea. The BPS vessels and their role were transferred to the Indian Navy in 1834.

The information in the tables below comes primarily from Phipps (designated with a "†"), or Hackman (designated with a "‡"). The vessels listed are those one source or the other identified as serving the Bengal Pilot Service. Where the two sources disagree with respect to some datum such as year of launch, or burthen, the first datum mentioned is from Phipps and the second is from Hackman.

== A & B ==
Name	Type	Tons burthen (bm)	Year built	Where built	Remarks
Abercromby†		147	1794	Fort William (Calcutta)	Converted to a buoy vessel; condemned and sold out of the service 1807
Amazon†	Cruiser	138	1769	Calcutta	Stationed at Chittagong; dispatched to Cochin China April 1778
Apollo†	Yacht				Sold 4 January 1769
Arrival‡	Sloop		1676		
Asseergurh†		197	1819	Kidderpore	Sold 1839, or still in BPS in 1851
Balasore‡	Sloop		1689		
Beacon†	Light vessel	180	1831	Howrah	Stationed at the Sand Heads; still in BPS in 1851
Blessing‡	Sloop	80	1670	London	
Bombay‡	Sloop		1742		Not in the BPS in 1766†
Bonetto† or Bonetta‡	Sloop	107	1748 or 1746	Bombay	Sold November 1786
Brilliant‡	Brigantine		July 1743	Bombay Dockyard	Madras Pilot Service

== C ==
Name	Type	Tons burthen (bm)	Year built	Where built	Remarks
Caranga† (equally Caranja)	Schooner	130	1775	Bombay	Destroyed by a fire April 1779
Calcutta‡	Sloop		1746	Pegu	Authorized 14 April 1755 to be sunk to end white ant infestation; sold 1756 for breaking up
Calcutta‡	Snow		1757	Calcutta	Not in the BPS in 1766†
Carnac†‡	Schooner		1762, or 1761, or 1763	Bombay, or Chittagong	Sold 3 March 1767
Carolina‡	Sloop		1739	Pegu	
Cartier†‡	Brig	150, or 170†‡	1787	Bombay	Captured 21 January 1796 in Balasore Roads; recaptured February and taken into Madras
Cassimbazar (equally Cossimbazar			Fitted out October 1712		Out of service c.1731, but rebuilt c.August 1733
Cavery†, or Cauvery‡	Brig	200	1838	Bombay Dockyard	Still in BPS in 1851
Cecilia	Ship	191	1813	Bombay	Sold at Calcutta into country service 1828; Lengthened at Moulmain 1838
Chandernagore†	Schooner	85		Chandernagore	French pilot vessel seized at Calcutta on 5 July 1793; Condemned and sold at Calcutta on 27 June 1795
Change†	Schooner	144	1799	Fort William	Transferred to the Residency at Ambonya September 1810. Participated in the 1810-11 British invasion of Java and the Moluccas.
Charles‡	Sloop		1683	London	
Charles†	River transport	115	1796	Calcutta	Sold 1808
Charlotte†	Yacht	174	1794	Calcutta	Converted to an agent vessel 1802; condemned and sold 1808
Chaser†		160	1778	Batavia	
Chittagong†	Sloop		1755	Mauritius	Sold 22 April 1767
Colleron†‡ (or Coleroon)	Brig	200	1838	Bombay Dockyard	Still in BPS in 1851
Comet†	Floating light vessel	139	1777	Calcutta	Sold 1788
Conimere‡	Sloop		1682	India	Purchased April 1683 at Madras for the BPS
Cornwallis†‡	Brig	170	1787	Bombay Dockyard	10 or 19 December 1796 the French privateer Enterprise captured her and she arrived at Mauritius in January 1797. (Note: Enterprise also captured the BPS schooners Hay and Ranger at the same time.)
Cudbert Thornhill†		160	1804	Calcutta	Sold 8 April 1818 into country service
Cuddalore†‡	Sloop, or schooner		1752	Bombay Dockyard	Lost 1775

== D — G ==
Name	Type	Tons burthen (bm)	Year built	Where built	Remarks
Diamond Harbour	Anchor boat		1796	Fort William	
Diana‡	Ketch				The EIC purchased her on 4 July 1704 for the BPS
Diligence†	Schooner	101		Bombay	
Dolphin‡	Sloop		1748	Bombay	
Eliza†‡	Schooner	189; 251 after lengthening	1813	Bombay Dockyard	Condemned and sold September 1831 out of the service at Calcutta; local buyers renamed her Will Watch. Lengthened and registry transferred to London. Last listed 1844.
Expedition	Sloop		1703	Fort St. George, India (Madras)	
Fanny‡	Snow		1757		
Fly	Sloop				Sold February 1772
Flora†‡	Brig	189	1814	Bombay	Sold into the country service 1836
Fort St George‡	Sloop		1739	Pegu	Grounded 20 April 1751 and possibly wrecked
Ford†	Sloop		1750	Java	Sold 1 October 1770
Friendship	Ketch		1705		
Ganges‡	Sloop		1676		
Ganges‡	Sloop		1703		
Ganges‡	Brig	130	1794	Bombay Dockyard	Destroyed by fire in the Saugor Roads 11 January 1797. An explosion in the magazine killed eight crew members; six hours later Laurel rescued the survivors.
George†	River transport	115	1796	Calcutta	Sold 1807
George†	River transport	109	1807	Kidderpore	Sold into the country service 13 May 1819
Gillett†	Schooner	140	1793	Calcutta	Captured by a gang of French parole violators at Kedgeree 29 October 1795
Gingali	Sloop or brigantine				Also Gingalle; destroyed by pirates at Anjengo June 1696
Grampus†‡	Sloop	105	1748	Bombay Dockyard	Sold September 1775 to local buyers
Guide†		150	1799	Fort William	Sold 23 July 1814
Guide†	Brig	189	1817	Bombay Dockyard	In 1822 she rescued the passengers and crew of Matilda. Guide was sold 1837 to local buyers and renamed Sir William Wallace

== H & I ==
Name	Type	Tons burthen (bm)	Year built	Where built	Remarks
Haldane†	Schooner	163	1797	Fort William	Sold 28 June 1816; possibly sold at Port Jackson 1821
Harland†		132	1772	Bombay Dockyard	Dispatched to sea October 1776 and lost
Harriett†	Agent vessel	70	1795	Calcutta	Sold into the country service
Harrington†		150	1796	Calcutta	The French privateer Apollon, Captain Jean-François Hodoul, captured her on 9 November 1797 off Sand Heads (equally, Balasore Roads). Harrington arrived at Mauritius on 21 December. The same privateer also captured Trial that same day.
Hastings†‡	Schooner	170	1787, or 1785	Bombay Dockyard	Converted to a buoy vessel May 1818; sold to local buyers 11 October 1820. A fire destroyed her in the night on 17 April 1823 while she was at Pulau Pasang, off Padang.
Hattrass† (or Hatras)		197	1819	Kidderpore	Still in BPS in 1851
Hawk†		180	1778	Batavia	Sold March 1783
Hawke‡	Sloop		1749	Bombay Dockyard	
Hawke‡	Gallivat		1773	Bombay Dockyard	
Hay†		150	1796	Calcutta	On 21 December 1796 the French privateer Enterprise captured her in Balasore Roads. (Note: Enterprise also captured the BPS schooners Cornwallis and Ranger at the same time. Phipps states that the French privateer captured Hay on 9 November 1797. The two pilot schooners the French captured on 9 November 1797 were Trial and Harrington. Enterprise, Legere, master, armed Hay and put a crew on board so that she could also serve as a privateer. She captured the English brig Castor, which arrived at Mauritius on 17 February 1797. Hay herself, Perroud, master, arrived at Mauritius on 5 March.)
Henry Meriton†‡	Brig	190	1817	Bombay Dockyard	Sold 1838 to local buyers and renamed William
Hertford†‡	Sloop		1752	Pegu	Sold 1 July 1767
Hope†	Light vessel	180	1834	Howrah	Stationed at the Sand Heads. In 1842 she caught fire whilst at Saugor, but was saved. There was suspicion against some of the crew. Still in BPS in 1851.
Hooghly†‡ (or Hooghli, or Houghley)	Schooner	130, or 147, or 150	1794	Bombay Dockyard	Captain Humphrys, rescued, with John Bebb, the passengers and crew of Asia, Captain Tremenheere 1 June 1809; condemned and sold out of the service at Calcutta. Lost.
Hughley Anna‡	Ketch		1705		
Hunter‡	Schooner		1758		
Indus (later Industry†‡	Schooner	140	1776	Bombay Dockyard	Taken by the French 1782
Intelligence†	Schooner	160	1780	Calcutta	Transferred to the Fort Marlborough Residency 1782

== J — M ==
Name	Type	Tons burthen (bm)	Year built	Where built	Remarks
Jane†‡	Brig	170	1819	Bombay Dockyard	Still in BPS in 1851.
Jessey (or Jessy)	Schooner	163	1797	Fort William	Lost on the Reef Head 25 May 1815
Johanna‡ (also referred to as Juno†)	Snow	170	1787	Bombay Dockyard	Lost on the Andaman Islands expedition 1788
John Bebb†		155	1800	Calcutta	Captain Nash. Rescued, with Hooghli, the passengers and crew of Asia, Captain Tremenheere, 1 June 1809; participated in the 1810-11 British invasion of Java and the Moluccas.
John Shore†		167	1807	Calcutta	Sold 2 July 1818 to the country trade
Josiah‡	Ketch		1703		
Juno†	Yacht				
Juno† (see Johanna)					
Krishna†‡	Brig	200	4 April 1837	Bombay Dockyard	Still in BPS in 1851.
Lady William Bentinck†	Brig	200	1833, or 1834	Howrah	Still in BPS in 1851.
Lilly‡	Sloop		1679		
London	Sloop		Fitted out October 1712		
Louisa‡ (also referred to as Princess Louisa)	Sloop		21 December 1741	Bombay Dockyard	Sold to local buyers 1755
Lovely Sophia†	Snow	106	1775	Mauritius	Sold July 1786
L'Orient†		80	1771	Chandernagore	Pilot boat of the French Bengal Pilot Service; captured at Balasore 1778; sold 1785
Mary‡	Sloop	70	1695	Surat	Sold to local buyers 27 March 1705
Megna†‡	Brig	201	1836	Bombay Dockyard	Still in BPS in 1851.
Mercury†	Schooner		1667	Bardarmarghanka	Sold 24 February 1773
Mergee Frigate‡	Ship		1689		Sold almost immediately to French buyers
Mermaid‡	Sloop		1758		Wrecked at Calingapatam February 1759
Mermaid†					Dutch pilot vessel captured at Chinsurah 1796; sold and afterwards burnt at Penang
Mermaid†			1767	Surat	Sold 24 February 1773
Mermaid			1778		Sold
Mermaid†‡	Brig	18819/94	1825	Bombay Dockyard	Round stern. In the Pilot Service 1839; lost 1847; However, a Mermaid was still in BPS in 1851.
Minerva†	Cruizer	180	1770	Calcutta	Sold February 1774

== N — R ==
Name	Type	Tons burthen (bm)	Year built	Where built	Remarks
Nerbuddah†, or Nerbuda‡	Schooner	106	1776	Bombay Dockyard	Captured by the French 1782
Nereide†	Yacht	237	1821	Kidderpore	Sold 1824; sent to England
Nymphe†	Sloop	180	1778	Batavia	
Patna†	Sloop	108	1778	Java	Buoy vessel 1793; sold 1796
Phillip Dundas†‡	Brig	176 / 187	1797, or 1798	Bombay Dockyard	Sold. Conflicting reports exist concerning her subsequent career and fate.
Phoenix‡	Schooner		1667†		Sold for breaking up 30 April 1759
Phoenix†‡	Schooner	113	1770‡	Bombay Dockyard	Sold to local buyers June 1788, or in 1778
Phoenix†	Agent vessel	181	1808	Kidderpore	Sold 18 October 1820
Pilot†		90	1835	Howrah	Employed in river duties; still in BPS in 1851.
Planet†‡	Brig	174	1816	Bombay Dockyard	Acted as a light vessel. Sold to local buyers December 1832 (or 1838) and renamed Bright Planet
Plassey†‡			1762	Bombay	Sold to local buyers 24 February 1773
Porto Bello‡	Sloop		July 1741	Bombay	
Prudent‡	Sloop		1683		
Queen Anne‡‡	Sloop		1702		
Queensborough†	Sloop		1752	Bombay	Sold 1 October 1770
Ranger†‡	Schooner	160	1780	Bombay	A French privateer captured Ranger on 21 December 1796 in Balasore Roads. The privateer took off the pilot and the European crew members, and put on board a five-man prize crew. The next day the serang (boatswain) and the lascars overpowered the prize crew, killing one. They then took Ranger into Balasore. The EIC in 1805 sold Ranger to local buyers.
Ring†	Schooner				Sold 24 February 1772
Rising Sun‡	Ketch		1703		
Rochester‡	Sloop		1684	River Thames	
Royal James‡	Sloop		1683	River Thames	
Russell					Captured September 1712
Russell†‡	Schooner	111 or 110	1770	Bombay Dockyard	Taken by the French in Balasore Roads 14 January 1796

== S — W ==
Name	Type	Tons burthen (bm)	Year built	Where built	Remarks
St David‡	Ketch		1742		
Saugor†‡	Brig	200	1836	Bombay Dockyard	Still in BPS in 1851.
Sea Horse†‡	Sloop	108	1749 or 1759	Bombay	1785 or July 1786 transferred to the French at Chandernagore
Sea Horse†‡	Brig	188, or 18819/94	4 February 1825	Bombay Dockyard	Still in BPS in 1851.
Sophia†‡	Brig	189	1814	Bombay	Lost on the Long Sand 1818
Speedwell†‡	Schooner	107	1765	Bombay Dockyard	Sold to local buyers 1785
Sumatra‡	Sloop		1742	Bombay	
Swallow†	Ship	200	1779	Bombay	March 1780 dispatched to England; afterwards transferred to the Bombay Establishment; lost near Fultah c.1824
Swift‡	Schooner		1763	Bombay Dockyard	Converted into a State yacht, or foundered in Balasore Roads 1766
Syren†‡	Schooner or snow		1753	Bombay Dockyard	Sold to local buyers 1769
Syren†	Sloop	105	1783	Calcutta	Condemned and sold 15 July 1796
Tannah†	Schooner	142	1775	Bombay	The French captured her in February 1781; she was lost in 1782
Tartar‡	Sloop		1758		
Thomas‡	Sloop		1684		
Thomas‡	Sloop		1689	River Thames	
Torch†‡	Brig	167 or 174	1815	Bombay Dockyard	Built as a floating light vessel; converted into Harbour Master’s depot at Calcutta 1835; still in BPS in 1851.
Trial†‡ (also Tryal)	EIC packet	160 or 1603/94	1780	Calcutta	Made at least two voyages for the EIC; She returned to India 1786 and served the BPS; rebuilt 1796; the French privateer Apollon, Captain Jean-François Hodoul, captured Trial and Harrington in Balasore Roads on 9 November 1797.
Triton†	Schooner	102	1770	Bombay	Condemned and sold 19 January 1798
Tweed†‡	Schooner	170	1788	Bombay Dockyard	Sold 2 September 1815
Udny†	Brig	169	1802	Calcutta	Sold to local buyers 14 November 1814. In 1821 she was listed with W. Humble, master, and C. Taylor, owner; condemned and broken up at Calcutta 1821
William‡	Smack		1705		
William‡	Sloop		1739	Pegue	
