= King's Dock =

King's Dock may refer to

- King's Dock, Port of Liverpool
- King's Dock, New York, near Garrison, New York
- King's Dock, Swansea
- Kings Dock at Canarsie Pier
- King's Dockyard (1797-1833), the first dockyard in the colony of New South Wales.
