= Asia (1798 EIC ship) =

Great Britain
- Name: Asia
- Owner: EIC voyages 1-2:Robert Charnock; EIC voyages 4-5:3-5 Henry Bonham
- Builder: Humble, Liverpool
- Launched: 8. December 1798
- Fate: Wrecked 1809

General characteristics
- Tons burthen: 800, or 819 or 81960/94, or 871(bm)
- Length: Overall: 146 ft 1 in (44.5 m); Keel: 118 ft 7 1/2 in (36.2 m)
- Beam: 36 ft 3 1/2 in (11.1 m)
- Depth of hold: 14 ft 9 in (4.5 m)
- Complement: 1799:120; 1804:99; 1806:102; 1808:105
- Armament: 1799:26 × 18-pounder guns; 1804:32 × 18-pounder guns; 1806:32 × 18-pounder guns; 1808:32 × 18-pounder guns
- Notes: Three decks

Asia was launched at Liverpool in 1798. She competed four voyages for the British East India Company (EIC), and wrecked on her fifth. During the second she transported EIC troops to Macao to augment the Portuguese forces there, but the authorities there refused them permission to land. She was wrecked in 1809 on the outbound leg of a voyage to Madras and Bengal.

== Career ==
=== EIC voyage #1 (1799–1800) ===
Captain Robert Wardlaw acquired a letter of marque on 15 March 1799. He sailed from Portsmouth on 18 June 1799, bound for Madras and Bengal. Asia reached the Cape of Good Hope on 6 September, and arrived at Kedgeree on 19 November. Homeward bound, she was at Saugor on 14 February 1800 and Madras on 15 March, reached St Helena on 8 July, and arrived at Deptford on 20 October.

=== EIC voyage #2 (1801–1803) ===
Captain Wardlaw sailed from Portsmouth on 31 March 1801, bound for Madras and Bengal. Asia reached Madras on 24 July, and arrived at Diamond Harbour on 20 August.

Macao Expedition: During the French revolutionary and Napoleonic Wars the British Government and the EIC feared that the French would capture one or more of Portugal's colonies of Goa, Damam, Diu, or Macao and use such a capture as a base for operations against Britain's possessions. Because Portugal was a British ally, the British could not invade the colonies, it could only offer assistance in the form of extra troops. In 1801 the Admiralty asked Admiral Peter Rainier, the commander of Royal Navy operations on the East Indies Station to assist the Portuguese at Macao.

Governor-General Warren Hastings decided to charter two East Indiamen, Asia and Dover Castle, to carry troops to Macao and offer the troops to the Portuguese as an augmentation of the garrison. A third vessel, the transport Rainier, would accompany the expedition. (Note: It is not clear which vessel Rainier was. It may have been a 500-ton (bm) ship launched at Demaun (Daman) in 1801, taken into Government service as a transport, and lost at Trincomalee in 1803.)

The troops consisted of a company of the 78th Regiment of Foot, 500 men of the Bengal Marine Battalion, a company of European artillery, and a number of field and carriage guns, all under the command of Lieutenant-Colonel Hamilton. HMS Romney was to provide an escort as far as the straits of Macassar.

Asia was at Saugor on 29 October. The expedition set out on 10 November. Asia was at Kedgeree on 22 November, but back at Saugor on 3 December. She reached Malacca on 29 December.

The expedition stopped at Penang to exchange the Marine Battalion for soldiers there and at Malacca who would be better suited to the task at hand. Lieutenant-Colonel Hamilton then had the expedition stop at Amboina to take on water so that there would be sufficient on hand if the troops could not land at Macao. Asia was at Amboina on 4 February 1802, and the expedition sailed on 15 February; HMS Arrogant provided the escort.

The expedition arrived at Lintin Island on 18 March. The Governor of Macao refused on 24 March to give permission for the troops to land, absent orders from his superiors at Goa. Ultimately, permission was not forthcoming. Asia was at "Samoke" Island on 10 April, and Lintin again on 15 May. On 3 July Asia and Dover Castle sailed from Macao to return to Bengal. Asia arrived at Diamond Harbour on 22 October, as did Dover Castle.

Homeward bound, Asia was at Saugor on 15 December and Madras on 25 February 1803. She reached St Helena on 15 March, and arrived at Deptford on 15 August.

=== EIC voyage #3 (1804–1805) ===
Captain Henry Pendares (or Pindarves) Tremenheere acquired a letter of marque on 13 March 1804. He sailed from Portsmouth on 8 May, bound for Madras and Bengal. Asia reached Madras on 3 September and arrived at Diamond Harbour on 26 September. She was at Madras on 26 December. From there she stopped at Vizagapatam on 30 January 1805 and Masulipatam on 22 February. She returned to Madras on 4 March. Homeward bound, she reached St Helena on 20 June and arrived at Deptford on 27 September.

=== EIC voyage #4 (1806–1807) ===
Captain Robert Wardlaw acquired a letter of marque on 8 February 1806. He sailed from Portsmouth on 30 March, bound for Madras and Bengal in a convoy that included Lady Burges, Lord Melville, Lord Nelson, Sovereign, and Walthamstow, all under the escort of HMS Leopard.

During the night of 20 April Lady Burges wrecked on a reef off Boa Vista, Cape Verde. Boats from Leopard and the convoy were able to rescue 150 of the 184 people on board; 34 (or 38) drowned.

Asia reached Madras on 27 August and arrived at Diamond Harbour on 28 October. Homeward bound, she was at Saugor on 20 December and Vizagapatam on 2 February 1807. She returned to Madras on 15 March and was at Colombo on 18 March. She reached St Helena on 13 June and arrived at Blackwall on 19 September.

=== EIC Voyage #5 (1808 – loss) ===
Captain Tremenheere acquired a letter of marque on 25 July 1808. He sailed from Portsmouth on 17 September 1808, bound for Madras and Bengal. Asia was wrecked on 1 June 1809 on a sandbank in the Hooghly River as she was coming from Madras. The Bengal Pilot Service vessels Hooghly and John Bebb rescued the passengers and crew. The EIC valued the cargo it lost on Asia at £28,586. The total loss was valued at £43,011.

Tremenheere commanded Penang on her voyage from the shipyard where she was launched at Penang to London, where the British Royal Navy took her into service under the name HMS Malacca. Tremenheere went on to command Asia on three voyages for the EIC.
