= Lady Burges (1799 EIC ship) =

Great Britain
- Name: Lady Burgess
- Owner: John Prinsep
- Builder: Perry, Wells & Green, Blackwall
- Launched: 14 October 1799
- Fate: Wrecked 20 April 1806 Ship notes =

General characteristics
- Tons burthen: 821, 868, or 8686/94 (bm)
- Length: Overall:146 ft 1 in (44.5 m); Keel:118 ft 7 in (36.1 m)
- Beam: 36 ft 1 in (11.0 m)
- Depth of hold: 14 ft 9 in (4.5 m)
- Complement: 1800:95; 1803:90
- Armament: 1800: 26 ×18-pounder guns; 1803: 22 ×18-pounder guns
- Notes: Three decks

Lady Burges (or Lady Burgess) was launched in 1799 as an East Indiaman. She made three voyages for the British East India Company (EIC) between 1800 and 1805. She was wrecked in 1806 early in her fourth voyage.

== Career ==
EIC voyage #1 (1800–1801): Captain Archibald Francis William Swinton acquired a letter of marque on 31 January 1800. He sailed from Portsmouth on 17 March 1800, bound for Madras and Bengal. Lady Burges reached Madras on 13 July and arrived at Diamond Harbour on 29 August. She was at Kedgeree on 24 October. Homeward bound, she was at Saugor on 8 January 1801. She reached St Helena on 21 May and Cork) on 24 July, and arrived at the Downs on 11 August.

EIC voyage #2 (1802–1803): Captain Swinton sailed from Portsmouth on 1 March 1802, bound for Madeira, Madras, and Bengal. Lady Burges was at Madeira on 13 March, reached Madras on 4 July, and arrived at Diamond Harbour on 17 July. Homeward bound, she was at Saugor on 3 January 1803. She reached St Helena on 16 June and arrived at the Downs on 20 August.

EIC voyage #3 (1804–1805): By the departure time of Lady Burges's third voyage war with France had resumed. Captain Swinton had already acquired a new letter of marque on 20 June 1803, i.e., in absentia while still returning from his second voyage. He sailed from Portsmouth on 8 May 1804, bound for St Helena and Bengal. Lady Burges reached st Helena on 6 August and arrived at Kedgeree on 25 November. Homeward bound, she was at Saugor on 4 February 1805, reached St Helena on 29 June, and arrived at the Downs on 10 September.

== Fate ==
Captain Swinton sailed from Portsmouth on 30 March 1806, bound for Madras and Bengal. Lady Burges was one of six East Indiamen including Asia, Lord Melville, Lord Nelson, Sovereign, and Walthamstow, all under the escort of HMS Leopard.

Lady Burgess struck during the night on 20 April 1806 on Leyton's Rock, south-west of Boa Vista, Cape Verde. She fired signal guns and the rest of the convoy immediately hove-to. In the morning they discovered her dismasted on a reef. The vessels of the convoy dispatched boats but the heavy surf made rescue extremely difficult and dangerous. Of the 184 people on board, 34 (or 38) died, including Midshipman Swinton (Captain Swinton's son), and seven women and a child. (Note: For a fuller account see Marshall.) The EIC valued the cargo it had lost at £19,158.
