= HMCS Integrity (1804) =

Australian colonial vessel (1804–1805)

History

United Kingdom
- Name: Integrity
- Owner: Colony of New South Wales
- Builder: Thomas Moore, King's Dockyard, Sydney
- Laid down: September 1802
- Launched: 13 January 1804
- Completed: October 1803
- In service: 1804–1805
- Home port: Port Jackson
- Fate: Disappeared 1805

General characteristics
- Type: Cutter
- Tons burthen: 59 3/4 tons bm
- Length: 46 ft (14 m) (keel), 60 ft (18 m) (overall)
- Beam: 16 ft 9 in (5.11 m)
- Crew: 9

HMCS Integrity was a cutter built by the Colonial Government of New South Wales in 1804. She was the first vessel ever launched from a New South Wales dockyard and carried goods between the colony's coastal settlements of Norfolk Island, Newcastle, New South Wales, Van Diemen's Land and Port Jackson. In 1804 she took part in a series of voyages to Van Diemen's Land with the aim of founding a colony at Port Dalrymple, the site of the modern settlement of George Town, Tasmania.

In 1805 Integrity encountered and recaptured a Spanish brig which had been unlawfully seized by privateers and concealed in the Kent Group of islands in Bass Strait. Having returned the Spanish vessel to colonial control, Integrity was designated the task of sailing to Chile to negotiate its return to Spain. She set sail for Valparaíso, Chile, in June 1805, but was not seen again and is likely to have foundered during the voyage.

== Construction ==
Port Jackson, where Integrity was constructed and launched from a dockyard (unmarked) on the shore of the cove.

Integrity was laid down in September 1802 at the newly opened King's Dockyard in the colony of New South Wales. Governor Philip Gidley King ordered that construction proceed as swiftly as possible, in order to test the Dockyard's capacity. A team of two shipwrights, two apprentice shipwrights and two sawyers were assigned the task and delivered the finished cutter in thirteen months. During construction shipwright Thomas Moore tested that the hull was watertight by filling it with water from the inside, and repairing any visible leaks. Her hold also incorporated a partition that her crew could move to or away from the forecastle bulkhead to vary her cargo capacity.

Governor King's direction had been for a vessel measuring around 46 tons burthen, but the final vessel was significantly larger at 59 3/4 tons. King was impressed with the work despite this variation from the original plans; in a letter to Lord Hobart, Secretary of State for War and the Colonies, he praised the speed and quality of Integrity's construction and described her as "extremely well put together and strong".

The newly built vessel was launched on 13 January 1804 as "His Majesty's Armed Colonial Cutter Integrity" under the command of Royal Navy Lieutenant John Houstoun and with a crew of eight men. She was the first seagoing vessel to be launched in the colony of New South Wales, all previous craft having been small enough to be floated off the shore. Throughout her active service she remained under the direct control of the colonial government of New South Wales, and was never formally commissioned into the Royal Navy.

== Active service ==
=== Early voyages ===
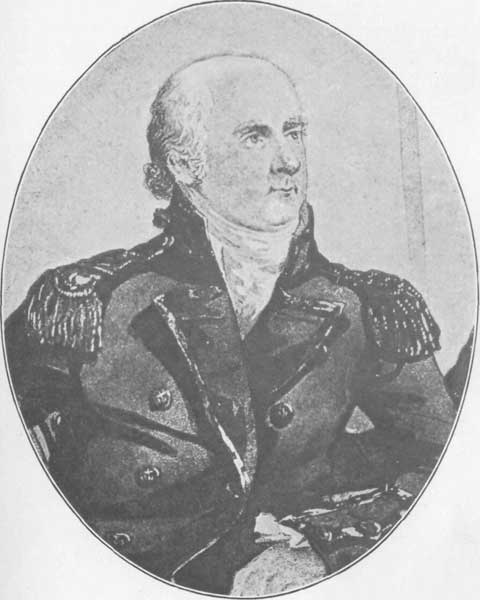
Colonial Governor Philip Gidley King, under whose authority Integrity's voyages took place.

Integrity's first voyage was in February 1804, heading south along the eastern coastline of Australia to transport settlers and supplies across Bass Strait to the colonial outpost in Van Diemen's Land. (Note: Newspaper coverage of the voyage incorrectly listed Lieutenant Bowen as travelling aboard Integrity, a claim contradicted by both King and Bowen himself in correspondence regarding his refusal to board.) The administrator of that outpost, Lieutenant John Bowen, had recently resigned his position and returned to Port Jackson. Governor King now directed that Bowen travel back to Van Diemen's Land aboard Integrity in order to formalise the transfer of colonial authority to his successor. However Bowen refused to go aboard, and the cutter ultimately sailed without him in order to deliver its supplies. The voyage was a success other than a broken rudder fastener which was repaired when Integrity reached Van Diemen's Land in early March. The cutter then completed the round trip back to Port Jackson, arriving safely at her home port on 24 April.

On 1 June Governor King issued directions for Integrity's second voyage. With Lieutenant Houstoun again in command, the cutter was to transport Lieutenant-Colonel William Paterson to the north of Van Diemen's Land in order to found a new settlement at Port Dalrymple. To support the settlement, the cutter was also assigned to carry nineteen soldiers of the New South Wales Corps, a ship's surgeon and ten convicts. A further fifteen soldiers and eleven convicts would accompany the expedition aboard a privately owned vessel, Contest. Once Paterson had disembarked at Port Dalrymple, Integrity was to follow the coastline of Port Phillip Bay so that Houstoun could survey the shore and determine its suitability for future colonisation. The cutter would then proceed to Cape Barren Island, a remote location in Bass Strait, to investigate rumours that a group of American sailors were establishing an unlawful trade in seal skins.

Integrity and Contest set sail on 8 June, heading south along the New South Wales coast. A week later they encountered heavy storms and winds while passing Cape Howe and were unable to proceed. Lieutenant Houstoun ordered the vessels to return to Port Jackson, which Integrity regained on 19 June. (Note: In a letter to the Secretary of State for the Colonies, Governor King incorrectly records Integrity's return to Port Jackson as occurring on 21 June.) While in port, one of Integrity's crew, a sailor named William Dwyre, was removed from the ship and sent to prison for having refusing to carry out his duties while aboard. There was no sign of Contest and she was presumed lost at sea.

The voyage was re-attempted on 3 July, but Integrity again ran into heavy weather off Cape Howe and was forced to turn towards the shore to seek shelter. The cutter entered what would later be known as Twofold Bay on the New South Wales South Coast, where to her crew's surprise they discovered Contest, undamaged but unable to return to sea in the storm.

The passengers and crew of both vessels consulted on whether to continue southwards or turn back and await better weather. According to one source, missionary W.P. Crook aboard Integrity, there was unanimity for continuing the voyage except for Captain Houstoun, who wished to turn back. As Houstoun was the nominal commander of the voyage his view prevailed and Integrity and Contest returned to Port Jackson together, arriving on 13 July.

=== Port Dalrymple flotilla ===
Integrity's repeated failure to reach Port Dalrymple convinced Governor King that larger vessels would be required to make the voyage. The East India Company was approached to provide either Coromandel or Experiment, both then in New South Wales waters, but the request was declined. In the interim Integrity was sent north with provisions for the colonial settlement at Norfolk Island, departing on 20 July 1804 and returning in early August. In September she sailed a round trip to the New South Wales colony of Newcastle to ship a cargo of cedar wood back to Port Jackson, followed by another brief voyage to Norfolk Island.

On 1 October Governor King issued orders for a flotilla to attempt the voyage. The expedition would be led by the 12-gun Royal Navy storeship HMS Buffalo and the 6-gun survey vessel HMS Lady Nelson. They would be accompanied by Integrity, and by the elderly colonial schooner Francis which had been in service since 1792 and was described by King as "much damaged" but still seaworthy. Lieutenant-Colonel Paterson and the principal colonists would travel aboard Buffalo but transfer to Integrity if the Navy vessel was too large to enter the bay where the settlement was proposed to stand.

The flotilla departed Port Jackson on 15 October, proceeding southward down the New South Wales coastline towards Bass Strait. Cape Howe was passed without incident, though the schooner Francis struggled with the ocean swell and continually fell behind the larger vessels. The weather slowly worsened until on sunset of 18 October the flotilla encountered a heavy gale. Captain William Kent of Buffalo signaled for the flotilla to take in their sails and ride out the storm; on the following morning the crew of Integrity discovered that they had lost sight of all three other vessels and were running dangerously close to a lee shore. Houstoun elected to continue southward close to land, preferring the risk of running aground to that of braving the gale in deeper water. There was a glimpse of Buffalo far to the east on the morning of 21 October, "laboring much and lurching very deep" among the waves. Other than this sighting Integrity continued her voyage alone through the storm, crossing Bass Strait into clearer weather on around 23 October. The cutter was brought into an uninhabited bay on the northeast coast of Van Diemen's Land where she underwent basic repairs.

After ten days she was returned to sea and reached Port Dalrymple on the morning of 5 November. Buffalo had already arrived, but there was no sign of Lady Nelson or Francis. Houstoun's achievement in navigating the storm was recognised through a transfer to Buffalo, a larger and more prestigious vessel than Integrity. Command of Integrity was allocated to midshipman Charles Robbins, who was promoted Acting Lieutenant by virtue of his new role. The remaining vessels in the flotilla, Lady Nelson and Francis, arrived in Port Dalrymple on 21 November. Integrity departed a week later, Robbins having been ordered to explore the far western coastline of Van Diemen's Land.

=== Capture of Saint Francisco & Saint Paulo ===
In April 1805 Integrity encountered the brig Saint Francisco & Saint Paulo off the Kent Group of islands in Bass Strait. The brig and another ship, Extremeña, had been seized from the Chilean ports of Caldera and Coquimbo in September 1804 by Captain William Campbell of the privateer Harrington. The Spanish ships had then been sailed to Port Jackson while Governor King considered whether to return them to Chile. Unwilling to await King's decision, Captain Campbell had ordered his crew to put to sea in Saint Francisco & Saint Paulo and conceal the vessel in an uninhabited location. Departing south from Port Jackson in early March, the brig ran into rough weather in Bass Strait and began to sink. When approached by Integrity, the Spanish ship was shipping 4 ft (1.2 m) of water over the lowest deck inside the hull. Integrity's crew assisted in keeping the brig afloat and she was safely conveyed to Port Dalrymple, arriving on 17 May 1805.

== Fate ==
In June 1805 Governor King received legal advice from the British Government indicating that retention of the Spanish vessels Extremeña and St Francisco & St Paulo could give rise to a charge of piracy. In these circumstances, King directed that Integrity should sail to Chile to offer the safe return of the Spanish ships. The cutter departed for Valparaíso, Chile on 20 June 1805. For the voyage she was again under the command of Acting Lieutenant Robbins, with a crew of ten men and bearing a flag of truce "in case war should have taken place between England and Spain" before she reached her destination. She was not seen again. Historian Frank Bladen has conjectured that the cutter either foundered en route, or reached South America but was captured by an indigenous tribe.

A year after Integrity's departure, on 20 July 1806, King wrote to Viscount Castlereagh expressing concern at the cutter's continued absence and hoping that she had simply been detained by Spanish authorities. She was last mentioned in a report on colonial shipping compiled by Governor King in August 1806 – fourteen months after her disappearance – with details of pay still owing to her crew and accompanied by the annotation "Gone to Valparaiso ... Not returned." (Note: In this report, King incorrectly records that Integrity set sail for Chile on 26 June 1805 instead of 20 June.)

== Bibliography ==
- Bateson, Charles (1972). Australian Shipwrecks – Vol.1 – 1622–1850. Sydney: A.H. and A.W. Reed. ISBN 0589071122.
- Bladen, F. M., ed. (1979). Historical Records of New South Wales. Vol. 4, Hunter and King, 1800, 1801, 1802. Lansdown Slattery & Co. ISBN 0868330051.
- Bladen, F. M., ed. (1979). Historical Records of New South Wales. Vol. 5, King, 1803, 1804, 1805. Lansdown Slattery & Co. ISBN 9780868330006.
- Lyon, David (1993). The Sailing Navy List : All the Ships of the Royal Navy : Built, Purchased and Captured, 1688–1860. Conway Maritime Press. ISBN 085177864X.
- Rusden, George William (1883). History of Australia, Volume 1 (PDF). London: Chapman & Hall. pp. 410–411.
