= HMS Leopard (1790) =

Ship of the line of the Royal Navy

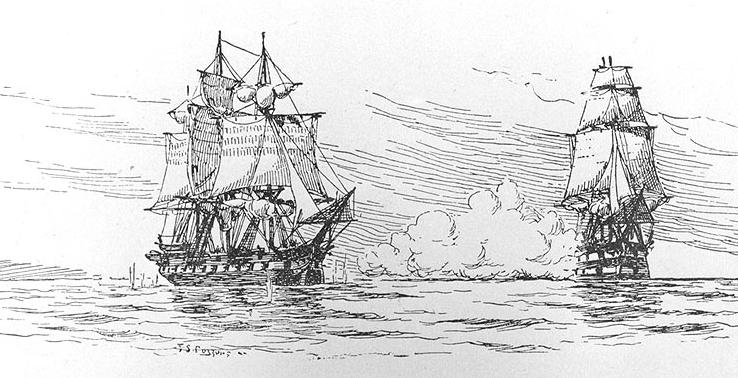
- The Chesapeake–Leopard affair

History

United Kingdom
- Name: Leopard
- Ordered: 16 October 1775; Reordered in May 1785
- Builder: Portsmouth Dockyard (1775); Sheerness Dockyard (1785)
- Laid down: January 1776 (Portsmouth); 7 May 1785 (Sheerness)
- Launched: 24 April 1790
- Completed: By 26 May 1790
- Reclassified: Troopship in 1812
- Honours and awards: Naval General Service Medal with clasp "Egypt"
- Fate: Wrecked on 28 June 1814

General characteristics
- Class & type: 50-gun Portland class fourth rate
- Tons burthen: 1,055 75/94 (bm)
- Length: 146 ft 5 in (44.6 m) (overall); 120 ft 0 3/4 in (36.6 m) (keel)
- Beam: 40 ft 8 in (12.4 m)
- Depth of hold: 17 ft 6 in (5.33 m)
- Propulsion: Sails
- Sail plan: Full-rigged ship
- Complement: 350
- Armament: Upper deck: 22 × 12-pounder guns; Lower deck: 22 × 24-pounder guns; QD: 4 × 6-pounder guns; Fc: 2 × 6-pounder guns

HMS Leopard was a 50-gun Portland class fourth rate of the Royal Navy. She served during the French Revolutionary and Napoleonic Wars, and was notable for the actions of her captain in 1807, which were emblematic of the tensions that later erupted in the War of 1812 between Britain and the United States. She was wrecked in 1814.

== Construction and commissioning ==
She was first ordered on 16 October 1775, named on 13 November 1775 and laid down at Portsmouth Dockyard in January 1776. She was reordered in May 1785, ten years after having first been laid down, and construction began at Sheerness Dockyard on 7 May 1785. Work was at first overseen by Master Shipwright Martin Ware until December 1785, and after that, by John Nelson until March 1786, when William Rule took over. She was launched from Sheerness on 24 April 1790, and was completed by 26 May 1790. She was commissioned for service in June that year under her first commander, Captain John Blankett.

== Service ==
The China fleet of East Indiamen left Macao on 21 March 1791. Leopard and Thames escorted them as far as Java Head.

=== French Revolutionary Wars ===
On 24 October 1798, Leopard captured the French privateer vessel Apollon, which was under the command of Captain La Vaillant. On 22 August 1800 Leopard captured Clarice.

Because Leopard served in the navy's Egyptian campaign (8 March – 8 September 1801), her officers and crew qualified for the clasp "Egypt" to the Naval General Service Medal that the Admiralty issued in 1847 to all surviving claimants.

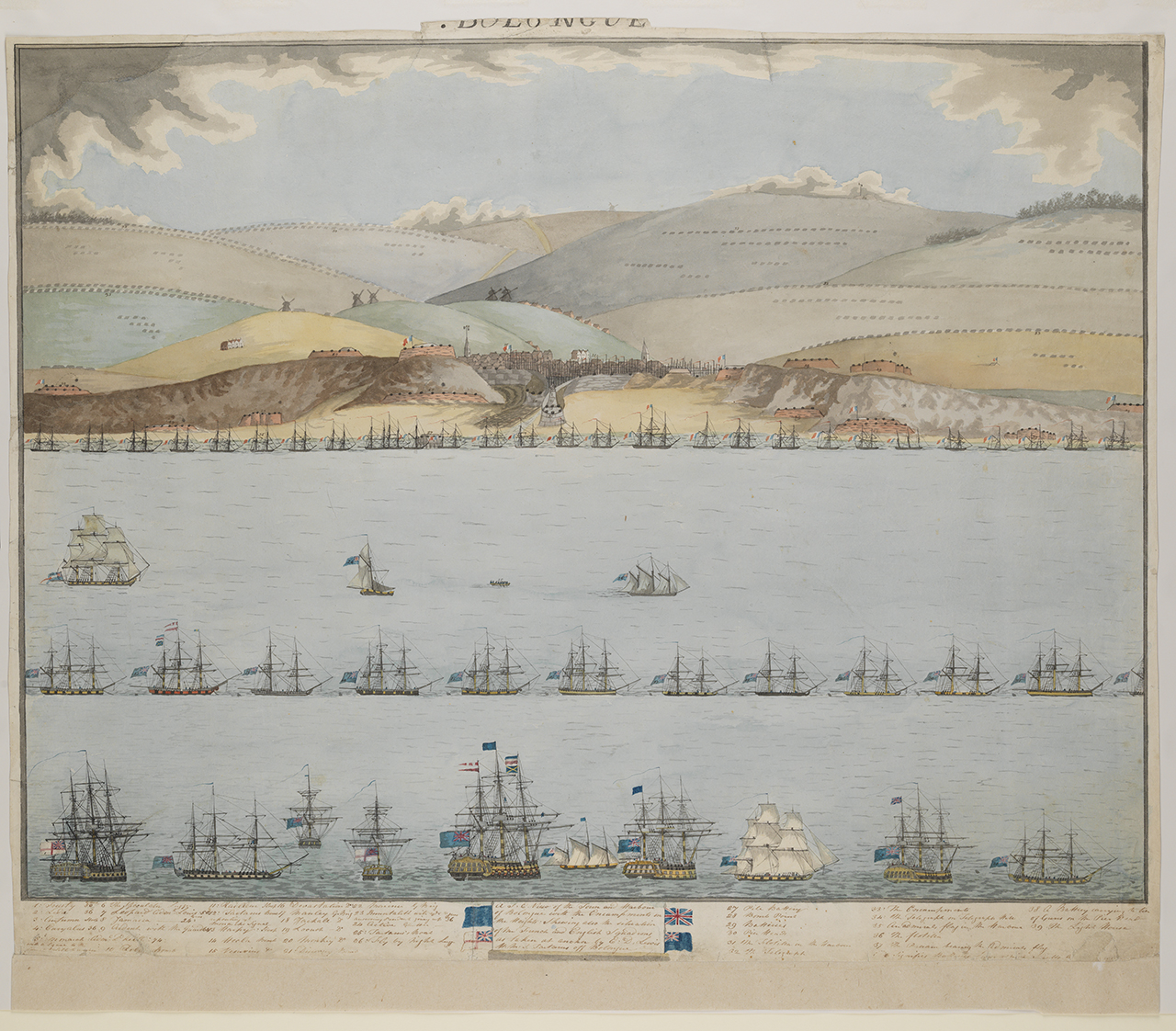
Leopard during the attack on Boulogne in October 1804

=== Napoleonic Wars ===
Leopard left Britain on 30 March 1806 as escort to a convoy that included Asia, Lady Burges, Lord Melville, Lord Nelson, and Sovereign. During the night of 20 April Lady Burges wrecked on a reef off Boa Vista, Cape Verde. Boats from the convoy were able to rescue 150 of the 184 people on board; 34 or 38 drowned. Leopard left the convoy at Latitude 9°N, and arrived at Spithead on 8 June.

==== The Chesapeake-Leopard affair ====
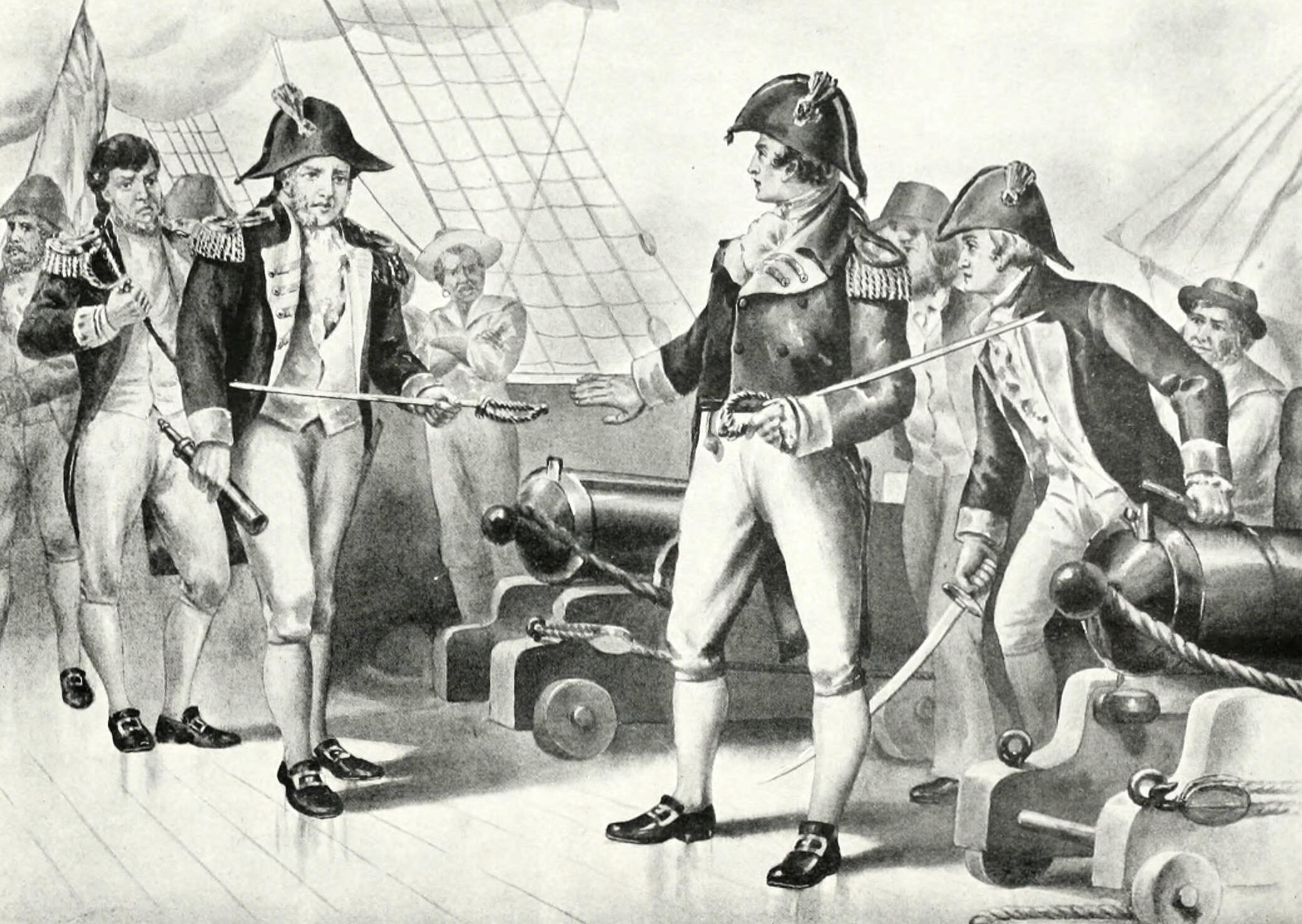
Barron surrenders to Humphreys aboard Chesapeake

In early 1807, a handful of British sailors—some of American birth—deserted their ships, which were then blockading French ships in Chesapeake Bay, and joined the crew of USS Chesapeake. In an attempt to recover the British deserters, Captain Salusbury Pryce Humphreys, commanding Leopard, hailed Chesapeake and requested permission to search her. Commodore James Barron of Chesapeake refused and Leopard opened fire. Caught unprepared, Barron surrendered and Humphreys sent boarders to search for the deserters. The boarding party seized four deserters from the Royal Navy—three Americans and one British-born sailor—and took them to Halifax, where the British sailor, Jenkin Ratford, was hanged for desertion. The Americans were initially sentenced to 500 lashes, but had their sentence commuted; Britain also offered to return them to the United States.

The incident caused severe political repercussions in the United States, and nearly led to the two nations going to war.

Leopard escorted a convoy from Portsmouth on 6 May 1808. Leopard left the convoy on 28 July at 35°S 7°E.

She then was part of the convoy assigned to Josias Rowley in the Mauritius campaign of 1809–1811 in the Indian Ocean.

== Fate ==
In 1812, Leopard had her guns removed and was converted to a troopship. On 28 June 1814 she was en route from Britain to Quebec, carrying a contingent of 475 Scots Guardsmen, when she grounded on Anticosti Island in heavy fog. Leopard was destroyed, but all on board survived.

== Leopard in fiction ==
In Patrick O'Brian's novel Desolation Island, the fifth book of the Aubrey–Maturin series, Jack Aubrey commands Leopard on a cruise through the Atlantic and Indian oceans after the Chesapeake-Leopard Affair, a voyage which included the sinking of the fictional Dutch ship of the line Waakzaamheid, and a disastrous collision with an iceberg. In the sixth book, The Fortune of War, the ship is left at a British station in the Dutch East Indies, unable to support her complement of guns. She is called the "horrible old Leopard" in the fourth book in the series, The Mauritius Command, and in other books in the series, and ends her days as a store ship sailing from the English Channel to the Baltic.

Game developer Lucas Pope based the layout of the titular ship in his game Return of the Obra Dinn on the layout of HMS Leopard.

== Bibliography ==
- Marshall, John (1823–1835). "Index" . Royal Naval Biography. London: Longman and Company.
- Winfield, Rif (2007). British Warships in the Age of Sail 1793–1817: Design, Construction, Careers and Fates. Seaforth. ISBN 978-1-86176-246-7.
- Winfield, Rif (2005). The 50-Gun Ship: A Complete History (3rd ed.). Mercury Books. ISBN 1-84560-009-6.
