= Augustus Alt =

British soldier and engineer (1731–1815)

Augustus Theodore Henry Alt (1731 – 9 January 1815) was a British soldier and Australia's first Surveyor-General.

== Early life ==
Augustus Theodore Harman Alt was born to father Jost Heinrich (anglicised to Just Henry), a Hessian, and mother Jeannetta Preston, a Scotswoman, probably in London, but possibly overseas, in 1731. Just Henry entered the service of the Landgrave in Sweden as Writer to Major General Ernst Hartmann von Diemar, with whom he moved to London in 1725 as Registrar. Henry successively became Secretary, Private Secretary, Counsellor, Minister, and, 1760, Privy Counsellor, until his death in 1768. In later life he assumed the title "Baron of Hesse-Kassel," though its provenance is unclear as the title "Baron" was never awarded by the German Emperor. Nonetheless, a grant of arms was later awarded to the family by the British monarch.

Augustus was the third eldest of at least seven children, four boys and three girls, and possibly nine if another reported brother and sister are included.

== Career ==
By 1755 Augustus was Ensign in the 8th (The King's) Regiment of Foot. In 1757 as Lieutenant he accompanied Sir John Mordaunt's expedition to Rochefort, France. From 1760 during the Seven Years' War he served as aide-de-camp to General Henry Seymour Conway, and appears to have liaised with Prince Ferdinand. He ended up at the siege of Kassel in 1762, returning with the regiment in 1763, thereafter assisting it to build roads in Scotland until 1764. During late 1777 he helped raise the 72nd Regiment of Foot (Royal Manchester Volunteers) and served with that regiment at the Great Siege of Gibraltar, being appointed assistant Engineer there by Governor George Eliott in 1779. In 1781, he joined Colonel James Francis Erskine in trying to raise a battalion of Swiss Chasseurs for service with the East India Company. The venture was stopped by the Swiss authorities with Augustus and fellow officers being jailed for several months. In 1785, he was engineer for another thwarted venture with Erskine to assist the Polish adventurer Count Maurice Benyovszky found a settlement in Madagascar.

=== Surveyor General of New South Wales ===
In May 1787, Alt was appointed Surveyor of Lands for Britain's proposed penal colony on the newly claimed Australian continent. Later that year he embarked aboard the convict transport Prince of Wales with the First Fleet under Commodore Arthur Phillip. They arrived at Botany Bay in mid-January 1788 and shortly after moved to Port Jackson, landing on 26 January 1788. On arrival, Alt supervised the Fleet convicts in clearing the ground for the establishment of the first colonial buildings in Sydney Cove.

Soon after his arrival in New South Wales Augustus laid out the settlements of Albion (later Sydney), Parramatta and Tongabby (later Toongabbie), as well as surveying early land-grants and compiling the records of these. Ill health incapacitated him early on and he had asked to be relieved in 1791, although he did not retire from active duty until 1797. He was officially relieved on half-pay in 1802 and succeeded by his deputy, surveyor Charles Grimes.

At first, in his official capacity as he lived in the town of Sydney, then for many years afterwards on a large land grant, 'Hermitage Farm', at Ashfield about seven miles west (and now an inner western suburb). It is said that he moved to Parramatta c1810, or a little later. He died there on 9 January 1815. He had two children, Lucy and Henry, by convict Ann George but never married her. Ann died in 1814. Lucy died as a teenager in 1806. Henry, aged 17, left the colony at the end of 1815 on the ship Northampton bound for China, but nothing further is known of him. Augustus is buried at the Anglican St. John's graveyard, Parramatta, with a table monument giving full, if slightly incorrect, biographical details set down later by his nephew Matthew Bowles Alt, son of Just Alt, long-time rector at Mixbury, Oxon.

== Notes ==
Preceded by New creation	Surveyor General of New South Wales; 1787–1803	Succeeded by Charles Grimes
