= Charles Robbins (Royal Navy officer) =

British Royal Navy officer and navigator

Charles Robbins (1782–1805) was a British Royal Navy officer and navigator in the early nineteenth century. He was involved in the early exploration of Bass Strait and Port Phillip in southern Australia.

Robbins held the rank of Midshipman aboard the Buffalo on its voyage to New South Wales at the start of 1802.

He was appointed acting Lieutenant in command of Cumberland when Charles Grimes used her to survey King Island and Port Phillip in early 1803.

In June 1805, Governor of New South Wales, Philip Gidley King sent Robbins, in command of Integrity, to Valparaíso in Chile with letters to the Governor of Chile. The ship with its commander, two mates and eight seamen was never heard from or sighted again.

Robbins Island, off the Northwest coast of Tasmania, is named after him.
