= Elizabeth Henrietta (1816 ship) =

Australian brig

History

New South Wales
- Name: Elizabeth Henrietta
- Namesake: Elizabeth Henrietta, wife of Governor Lachlan Macquarie
- Builder: HM Dockyard, Sydney
- Launched: 13 June 1816
- Fate: Wrecked on 17 December 1825

General characteristics
- Type: Brig
- Tons burthen: 150 (bm)
- Propulsion: Sail

His Majesty's colonial brig Elizabeth Henrietta was completed in 1816 for New South Wales service, but capsized on the Hunter River, Australia later that year with the loss of two lives. The ship was wrecked in 1825.

Elizabeth Henrietta was ordered from the government dockyard in Sydney by Governor Hunter of New South Wales in 1797 when it was discovered that HMS Supply was unseaworthy, and the keel was laid in 1800. The frame was made from ironbark and stringybark but as there was a shortage of shipwrights the ship took an inordinately long time to construct. During that time it was called Portland but on its launch from HM dockyard in Sydney on 13 June 1816 it was named Elizabeth Henrietta in honour of the wife of Governor Lachlan Macquarie.

Having been sent to the Hunter River for a cargo of coal, on 30 July 1816 at around 4am, while at its moorings on the River, the ship capsized and sank. The wife of the Captain Joseph Ross and a crewman Patrick Fitzgerald were trapped as it sank and were drowned. The remaining crew, numbering five, rowed in an open boat to Sydney where they arrived on 7 August. The colonial brig Lady Nelson and the Nautilus of Calcutta were sent from Sydney to raise the ship, which they eventually did and the ship returned to Sydney on 30 August with the load of coal.

Elizabeth Henrietta transported convict prisoners to Newcastle on 30 November 1821. One convict on the ship was John McCraw.

In December 1823 the ship was sent to New Zealand for a cargo of flax. Captain Kent left Sydney on 5 November 1823 and reached Hokianga 8 days later. His mission was "to promote the civilisation of the inhabitants by supplying them with British manufactures in exchange for flax" and to collect flax for Sydney's botanic gardens. He left for Kawhia on New Years Day 1824. On 8 April 1824, Elizabeth Henrietta went aground after breaking adrift from the anchorage at Ruapuke Bay (now Henrietta Bay) on Ruapuke Island in Foveaux Strait, off the south coast of New Zealand's South Island. Attempts by her captain and HMS Tees to refloat the ship were unsuccessful, but further attempts were successful, with assistance by the engineer, John Busby, and Elizabeth Henrietta returned to Sydney on 13 March 1825. A cannon on the island is reputed to have come from the ship, as did the mice, which also remain there. A similar cannon is at Waingaro Marae, which historian, H. C. M. Norris, said was given by Captain Kent.

The ship was finally wrecked upon reefs at the mouth of the Hunter River, on a voyage from Port Macquarie and Newcastle for Sydney on 17 December 1825. All the crew, passengers, convicts and military on board were rescued.
