= H.M. Dockyard (Sydney) =

His Majesty's Dockyard Sydney, also known as Kings Dockyard, was a shipyard built in 1797 on the western shore of Sydney Cove, under orders by Governor John Hunter. In 1833 the dockyard was closed down.

== History ==
For much of the early history of Sydney, ships and shipyards were banned from construction to prevent convict escapes and to protect the East India Trade Company from competition. However, the regulations soon lifted due to impracticality and the first boatshed was built in 1788. In June 1797, construction began on HM Dockyard. By 1802 the site employed around 28 regular workers of various disciplines and was one of the largest centres of convict employment in the colony. The dockyard was closed in 1833 as naval technology began to advance.

== Master Shipwright ==
- Thomas Moore 1797-1809
- William Cossar 1812-1821
- John Nicholson 1821-1833

== Notable ships built or repaired ==
- Integrity, schooner launched in 1804, the first vessel to be built and launched from the Dockyard.
- Otter, repairs undertaken to the American seal fur trading vessel.
- Tom Thumb, built in 1796 for the 1796 expedition by George Bass and Matthew Flinders.
- HMS Porpoise, repaired.
- HMS Lady Nelson, repaired.
- Francis, repaired.
- Norfolk, repaired.
- Bee, repaired.
- Elizabeth Henrietta, laid down in 1801 as Portland and launched in 1816.
- HMS Cumberland, schooner launched in 1803.
