= Hodoul Island =

Uninhabited island in Seychelles

Nickname: Île Hodoul
- Location within Seychelles

Geography
- Location: Seychelles, Indian Ocean
- Coordinates: 4°37′30″S 55°27′10″E
- Archipelago: Inner Islands, Seychelles
- Adjacent to: Indian Ocean
- Total islands: 1
- Major islands: Hodoul
- Area: 0.009 km^{2} (0.0035 sq mi)
- Length: 0.2 km (0.12 mi)
- Width: 0.05 km (0.031 mi)
- Coastline: 0.5 km (0.31 mi)
- Highest elevation: 4 m (13 ft)

Administration
- Seychelles
- Group: Granitic Seychelles
- Sub-Group: Mahe Islands
- Sub-Group: Mahe Port Islands
- Districts: English River

Demographics
- Ethnic groups: Creole, French, East Africans, Indians.

Additional information
- Time zone: SCT (UTC+4)
- ISO code: SC-16
- Official website: www.puc.sc

Hodoul Island is an uninhabited island in Seychelles, lying in the center of the Victoria port. The island belongs to the Mahe Port Islands, which are mostly artificial islands created by funds from Dubai when the Dubai dredger was placed in Seychelles.

== History ==
The island was named after the corsair Jean-François Hodoul. In 1875, Dr. Henry Brooks of Seychelles rented it to store coal. He kept about 2,000 tons of coal there until 1940.

During 1995–2005, Hodoul Island served as a storage site for explosives for the Mahe port reclamation project.

In 2016, a new casino was opened on the west point of the island.

== Administration ==
The island belongs to English River District.

== Facilities ==
The island has a 500 m^{2} guesthouse on the east point, and a 600 m^{2} casino on the west point.

== Image gallery ==
Map 1

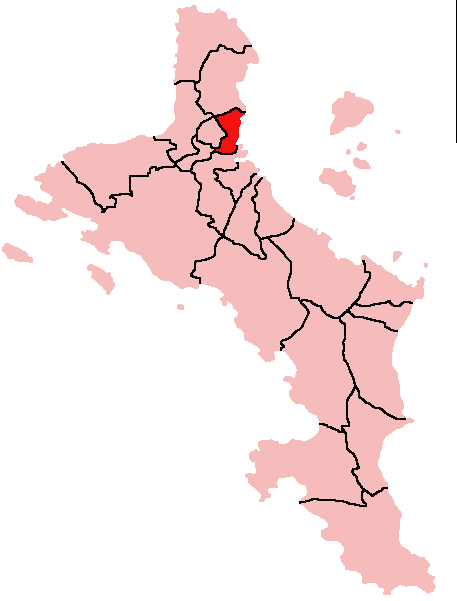
District Map
