= Estramina (1803 ship) =

Schooner

History

Spain
- Name: Extremeña
- Builder: Guayaquil, Viceroyalty of Peru
- Launched: 13 October 1803
- Captured: by British ship, 1 October 1804

New South Wales
- Name: Estramina
- Acquired: by purchase, 12 June 1806
- Fate: Wrecked, 19 January 1816

General characteristics (in Spanish service)
- Type: Schooner
- Tons burthen: 102 (bm)
- Sail plan: Fore-and-aft rig
- Complement: 18
- Armament: 4 × 4-pounder guns

Estramina, originally called Extremeña, a two-masted schooner of 102 tons, was built at Guayaquil, in the Spanish Viceroyalty of Peru, now in modern-day Ecuador, and launched on 13 October 1803. A Spanish Naval vessel, it was pierced for 12 guns but was armed with only four 4-pounders and carried a crew of 18. It was commanded by Lieutenant Mariano Isasbiribil, and engaged in hydrographical surveys.

On 1 October 1804 it was seized from port of Caldera in Copiapo Bay, Chile, by the armed merchant brig Harrington, Captain William Campbell, and sailed across the Pacific into Australian waters. Campbell probably believed that war between Britain and Spain, if not commenced already, was imminent. He instructed his prize crew to hide Extremeña in Jervis Bay, which is 90 miles to the south of Sydney, New South Wales whilst he sailed to Sydney in Harrington to check on the state of relations between the two countries.

When Campbell arrived in Sydney there were no reports that Britain and Spain had been at war when he had seized Extremeña. The Governor of New South Wales, Captain Philip Gidley King RN (1800–06), hearing the Spanish vessel was hiding in Jervis Bay, ordered it to be escorted to Sydney where it was detained pending instructions from the Secretary of State for War and the Colonies in London. King also wrote to the Governor of Chile to explain that Extremeña and a Spanish merchant brig St Francisco & St Paulo had been recovered. The diplomatic correspondence was dispatched on His Majesty's Colonial Cutter Integrity on 23 June 1805, but never arrived as Integrity was lost with all hands and without trace.

The Governor also reported the event to William Marsden, First Secretary to the Admiralty (1804–1807), stating that Extremeña had been under the command of Don Antonio José del Campo, which was not correct. The position of del Campo would, in the twentieth century, be called Extremeña's executive officer. His signature would have appeared on documents on board and been misinterpreted by Governor King and his advisors who had a limited knowledge of Spanish. Several authors have since copied this error.

Meanwhile, based on legal opinion, it was decided to sell Extremeña at public auction and hold the proceeds in trust until a final adjudication could be made. At the time the colonial government was in desperate need of vessels and decided to bid for the vessel itself. The auction took place on 12 June 1806 and the schooner went to the government for £2,100. It was renamed Estramina and gave excellent service for many years under government ownership. Its last commander was Joseph Ross.

One of Estramina's tasks was to evacuate the settlers, convicts, guards, and the like from Norfolk Island after the government in New South Wales decided to close the penal colony there.

The fate of Estramina was reported by the Commandant at Newcastle, New South Wales, Australia, on Friday 19 January 1816, as the vessel was beating out of the harbour with a strong north-east wind and ebb tide, she was obliged to come to anchor, which parted, and she drifted onto a sand bank, then broke up.
