= Thomas Moore (Australian settler) =

European settler (1762–1840)

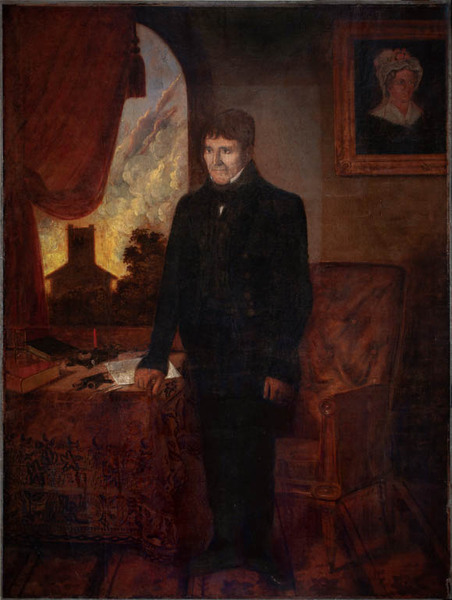
Portrait of the late Thomas Moore, Esq., of Liverpool, painted by William Griffith (1840). Oil on canvas.

Thomas Moore (1762 – 24 December 1840) was an early European settler in Australia.

== Biography ==
Moore was born in Lesbury, Northumberland. In 1792 he arrived in Australia as the ship's carpenter on William Raven's Britannia.

In October 1792 Raven left a sealing crew at Dusky Sound, New Zealand while he went off to obtain supplies for the colony. During that time a vessel (later finished and called the "Providence") was built. It is believed Thomas Moore, as ship’s carpenter was the person mainly responsible for its construction. (Ref Letters Raven to Lieutenant Governor King 1793).

In 1796 he was appointed master boatbuilder by Governor John Hunter. He married Rachel Turner in January 1797, who had come to NSW on Lady Juliana as a convict, been assigned to Surgeon John White, and to whom she bore a son, Andrew Douglas White.

In January 1804 Governor Philip Gidley King launched what was believed to be the first vessel ever built in the colony, the armed cutter Integrity, of 50 tons (bm). Thomas Moore built her at Sydney Cove.

In October 1809 Moore resigned from the dockyard and by mid-1810 was residing at the house he had built on the Georges River, Moore Bank. Governor Lachlan Macquarie appointed him magistrate of the Georges River district in 1810, a position he filled until he died on Christmas Eve 1840. When Macquarie proclaimed the new town of Liverpool on 7 November 1810, he commissioned Moore to build the town. Moore was supervisor of public works for the next decade. He became a good friend of Macquarie, who appointed Rachel and Thomas Moore the guardians of Lachlan Macquarie jnr, in case anything happened to Lachlan and Elizabeth while they were in NSW.

He was the recipient of numerous land grants, including land between Petersham Hill and Cook's River, Moorebank in the Liverpool district, Airds and Sutton Forest. His land holdings enabled him to breed cattle and horses, as well as to rent property to tenants, which brought him much wealth. Moore was one of the founding directors of the Bank of New South Wales, now known as Westpac Banking Corporation.

Moore died in 1840. In his will he left his substantial fortune to the Church of England, and, in particular, for the establishment of a college for the education of men of "the Protestant persuasion". The college, now known as Moore Theological College was opened on 1 March 1856.
