= Charles Grimes (surveyor) =

English surveyor in colonial Australia

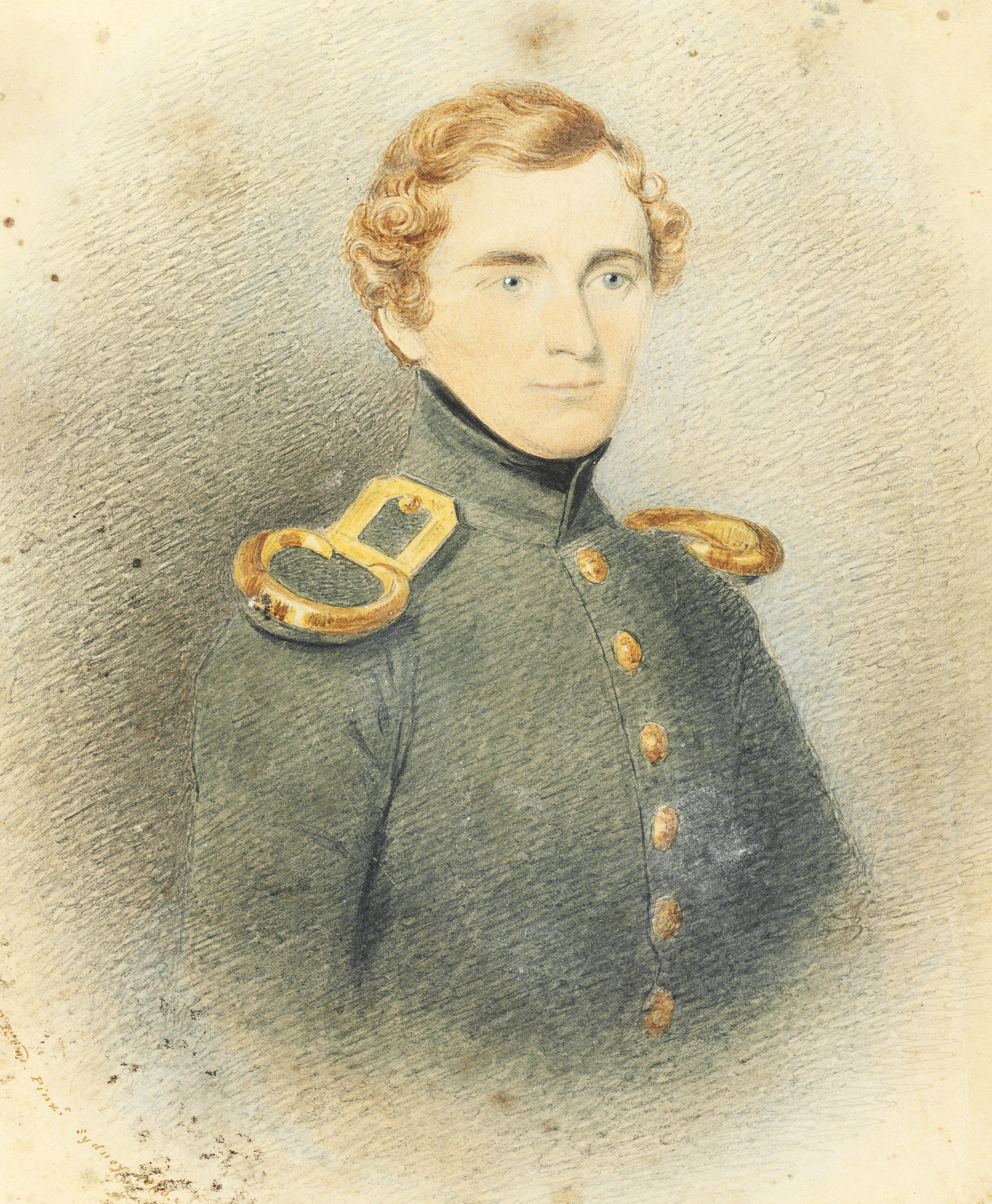
- Portrait of Robert Grimes, Australia, 1840
- Born: Charles Robert Grimes; 24 February 1772; Aylesbury, Buckinghamshire, England
- Died: 19 February 1858 (aged 85); Milton-next-Gravesend, Kent, England
- Occupation: Surveyor
- Spouse(s): Elizabeth Matthews, Cassandra Atkinson
- Children: John, George, Charles Robert, Joseph John (+ 2 others)

Charles Grimes (24 February 1772 – 19 February 1858) was an English surveyor who worked in colonial Australia. He served as Surveyor General of New South Wales and mapped the Yarra River in what is now the state of Victoria. During his career, he mapped the route of the Hobart Road, Tasmania's main north–south arterial route. Much of the modern Midland Highway still follows the route that he planned. Grimes was born in Aylesbury, Buckinghamshire, England, son of Joseph Grimes, a laceman, and his wife Esther.

== Surveying in Australia ==
Grimes is responsible for fully surveying the Hunter River in November 1801 with Francis Barrallier. In late 1802 Grimes commenced a survey of King Island and Port Phillip with Charles Robbins in Cumberland. On 30 January 1803, whilst on his survey of Port Phillip he and his party landed at Frankston where he met around thirty Indigenous people.

Some accounts state that Grimes acquired a block of land in Sydney from Robert Ryan. The land was a grant of 120 acres (0.49 km^{2}) which comprised effectively the entire modern suburb of Kirribilli. Grimes sold the land to Robert Campbell in about 1806.

== Late life ==
Grimes had two sons in New South Wales by Elizabeth Matthews. In 1815 he married Cassandra Atkinson in Woodford, Essex, and they had four children.

A bridge over the Yarra at Melbourne Docklands was named after him. Built in the 1970s, it has subsequently been substantially altered and was officially re-opened on 16 September 2000.

Preceded by Augustus Alt	Surveyor General of New South Wales; 1803–1811	Succeeded by John Oxley
