= Trial (1780 ship) =

History

Great Britain
- Name: Trial
- Builder: Calcutta
- Launched: 1780
- Captured: 9 November 1797

General characteristics
- Tons burthen: 160, or 1603/94 (bm)
- Length: Overall: 73 ft 8 in (22.5 m); Keel: 56 ft 10 1/2 in (17.3 m), breadth 23ft, hold 7ft 4in,
- Beam: 23 ft 7 in (7.2 m) hold 7ft 4in,
- Depth of hold: 7 ft 4 in (2.2 m)

Trial (or Tryal, or Trial Packet) was launched at Calcutta as a packet for the British East India Company. She made two voyages to England. In 1782 she narrowly escaped being seized by mutineers. After her return to Calcutta in 1786 she became a pilot schooner for the Bengal Pilot Service. A French privateer captured her in 1797.

== Career ==
The Tryal Packet, Captain Dempster, left Madras on 4 December 1780. Readily accessible online records do not show when she arrived. Also, a list of EIC packets does not include her.

The Trial Packet Captain Pointer, bound for the East Indies, put into Limerick on 9 November 1781, having lost her mainmast and topsails.

A report from Limerick dated 31 January 1782 stated that before Trial could sail for India a conspiracy was discovered. Ten members of the crew had planned, once at sea, to take her officers, kill them, and sail her and her dispatches to a French port. The plot was discovered when they attempted to draw the boatswain into the plot. The men appear to have been American prisoners who had escaped at Kinsale and had agreed to enroll together as sailors on a vessel that they would then seize. A later report revealed that the boatswain was a leader among the conspirators but revealed the plot angered that the other conspirators would not agree to give him as large a share of the proceeds of the plot as he felt entitled to.

Captain James Methurst Poynter sailed from Limerick on 12 February 1782, bound for Bengal and Benkulen. She was at Ganjam on 2 July 1782 where she handed over her dispatches; she then proceeded to Calcutta.

Trial was at Calcutta on 14 March 1783. She was at Bengkulen on 15 May, Padang on 30 May, and Bengulen again on 21 June Benkulen. On 9 July she was at Manna (Manna Point or Town, southeast of Bengkulu, on the west coast of Sumatra; now Mana (4.49°S 102.90°E), and reached Rat Island (a small island west of Bengkulu) on 18 July. She sailed from Rat Island on 12 October, reached Saint Helena on 18 December. She sailed from there on 23 December and reached Lough Swilly, Donegal, on 5 March 1784. She arrived back in the Downs on 13 April.

On 15 April 1784 the Trial Packet, Spencer, master, arrived at Gravesend. She had come from Ireland and St Helena.

On 28 September 1785, Captain Poynter sailed for India with dispatches; she left Falmouth on 16 October. Before Poynter left, Wells had repaired Trial and taken her measurements. (Note: Hackman mistook the date of the completion of the repairs and measurement for a launching.) Trial, Painter, master, was reported to have been in the Sunda Strait in July 1787.

When Trial arrived back in Bengal she remained in local service.

At some point Trial was taken into the Bengal Pilot Service.

Trial was rebuilt in 1796.

== Fate ==
The French privateer Apollon, Captain Jean-François Hodoul, captured Tryalle and Harrington in Balasore Roads on 9 November 1797.
