= HMS Cumberland (1803) =

History

New South Wales
- Name: HMCS Cumberland
- Builder: Thomas Moore, King's Dockyard, Sydney
- Launched: 1801
- Fate: Sold to Royal Navy in 1803

United Kingdom
- Name: HMS Cumberland
- Acquired: 1803
- Captured: December 1803
- Fate: Sold in 1810

General characteristics
- Class & type: Schooner
- Tons burthen: 29 (bm)
- Propulsion: Sails

HMS Cumberland was a schooner built in Port Jackson, Australia, in 1801.

== History ==
Cumberland was built at the King's Dockyard in Port Jackson in 1801. From construction she was owned by the colonial government of New South Wales, which used her to transport grain from the Hawkesbury region to the settlement at Sydney Cove. Her crew consisted of five men, comprising a master, a master's mate, and three able seamen.

The Royal Navy purchased her in early 1803 and deployed her under the command of Acting Lieutenant Charles Robbins to assist surveyor Charles Grimes in mapping the coastline of King Island and Port Phillip. On her return to Port Jackson, she was assigned to convey Matthew Flinders to England. However the poor condition of the vessel forced Flinders to put into French-controlled Mauritius, where he and the ship were interned. Cumberland remained in Mauritius when Flinders was released on 13 June 1810. Flinders left on the cartel Harriet, bound for Bengal, but when she encountered HMS Otter, he transferred to her as she was carrying dispatches to the Cape.

The Royal Navy captured Cumberland when it captured Mauritius in 1810. She returned to Royal Navy service and was sold that year.
