= Harrington (1796 ship) =

British brig, launched 1796, wrecked 1809

History

Great Britain
- Name: Harrington
- Owner: 1798: Bengal Pilot Service of the British East India Company; 1800: Chace, Chinnery & Co; 1802: William Campbell
- Builder: Calcutta
- Launched: 1796
- Fate: Wrecked in March 1809

General characteristics
- Type: Brig
- Tons burthen: 150, or 180 (bm)
- Sail plan: Brig
- Crew: 40
- Armament: 6 guns

Harrington was a British vessel launched at Calcutta in 1796, for the Bengal Pilot Service. A French privateer captured her on 9 November 1797, at Balasore Roads. She returned to British ownership and Calcutta registry c. 1800. She undertook sealing expeditions, captured two Spanish vessels off South America, and was seized by convicts in Port Jackson, before being wrecked in March 1809.

== Origin ==
Harrington was launched at Calcutta in 1796, for the Bengal Pilot Service (BPS). The French privateer Apollon, Captain Jean-François Hodoul, captured her on 9 November 1797, off Sand Heads (equally, Balasore Roads), and also another BPS vessel – Trial. Harrington arrived at Mauritius on 21 December.

There are no records available online that would clarify how Harrington returned to British ownership. Still, Australian records show the snow Harrington, of 180 tons (bm), William Campbell, master, as having been built at Calcutta in 1796.

She was registered in Calcutta. The East India Register and Directory (1803) showed Harrington, launched in Calcutta, with Covins, Bazett and Co., owners, and W.Campbell, master. It also showed the snow Harington, of 180 tons, W.Campbell, master registered at Madras.

== Career ==
Harrington sailed from Madras in 1801, under the command of William Campbell. She arrived at Port Jackson on 12 June, with miscellaneous goods, having come via Bengal. She brought 4000 gallons of spirits that Governor King refused to let her land. Campbell transferred the spirits to John, which left the colony with these and the 8000 gallons of spirits John had brought from the Cape of Good Hope and had also been denied permission to land.

Harrington cleared customs at Port Jackson on 2 September, in ballast. On 14 December, she returned to Port Jackson "from the Southward". On 24 January 1802, she returned to Port Jackson from Norfolk Island, in ballast.

On 10 February, Harrington cleared outward, bound for a seal hunting voyage. She began sealing in Bass Strait. While sealing around King Island, on 18 March, she discovered wreckage of a ship on the southern extremity. Harrington returned to port Jackson on 1 June with 5000 gallons of elephant oil and 5000 seal skins. On 8 October, Harrington cleared Port Jackson outward bound for Chile and Peru.

Returning for Madras on 9 June 1803, before leaving on a trading voyage to Peru and Chile before returning to Madras and leaving on 18 October, and returning to Sydney on 9 January 1804.

Returning to Peru and Chile, William Campbell acting on his belief that England and Spain were at war, proceeded to raid the South American coast as a privateer, capturing the coast-guard vessel Extremeña and the merchant brig St Francisco & St Paulo. On the return to Governor of New South Wales Philip Gidley King ordered that Harrington be detained until it was known whether hostilities with Spain had broken out at the time of the capture. Harrington was later returned on the advice of the crown law officers in England owing to a doubt whether Campbell had acted with a 'piratical intention', though his conduct was 'highly blameable'; the prizes, with other loot, were confiscated and sold for £5054.

A cargo of sandalwood from Fiji to China was undertaken, returning with merchandise in March 1808. Chace, Chinnery & Co. in liquidation and in May, Campbell purchased the remaining share in Harrington.

On 15 May 1808, convicts seized Harrington as she was preparing to return to Fiji.

== Fate ==
HMS Dédaigneuse caught up with Harrington in March 1809. Dédaigneuse put some men aboard Harrington, and took off one or two convicts. Harrington ran aground on the coast of Luzon and was wrecked. All the convicts still aboard escaped.
