= Sovereign (1800 ship) =

History

Great Britain
- Name: Sovereign
- Owner: 1800:John Locke; 1817:T.Ward
- Builder: Randall, Gray & Brent, Rotherhithe
- Launched: 26 March 1800
- Fate: Broken up in 1822

General characteristics
- Tons burthen: 650, or 671, or 67164/94 (bm)
- Length: Overall: 132 ft 6 in (40.4 m); Keel: 107 ft 9 in (32.8 m)
- Beam: 32 ft 10 in (10.0 m)
- Depth of hold: 12 ft 3 in (3.7 m)
- Complement: 1800:60; 1801:58; 1804:55; 1806:35
- Armament: 1800:4 × 9-pounder + 2 × 6-pounder guns + 20 × 18-pounder guns ("of the New Construction"); 1801:14x18&9; 1804:18 x 18&9; 1806:16 x 18

Sovereign was launched at Rotherhithe in 1800 as a West Indiaman. The British East India Company (EIC) then took her up as an "extra" ship on several contracts; in all she made seven voyages as an East Indiaman for the EIC. After she left the EIC's service in 1817 she continued to trade with India, but under a license from the EIC. She was broken up in 1822.

== Career ==
Sovereign first entered Lloyd's Register (LR) in 1800 with Mitchell, master, Lock & Co., owners, and trade London–Suriname. Captain Gilbert Mitchell acquired a letter of marque on 17 September 1800. She sailed from Deal for Suriname on 11 October. She returned to England on 17 March 1801.

On 25 March 1801 the EIC accepted a tender of Sovereign for one voyage. The rate was £37/ton for 616 tons (bm), plus £12/ton for surplus tonnage. Before she set out, Randall measured and surveyed her for the EIC.

=== 1st EIC voyage (1801–1803) ===
Captain Gilbert Mitchell acquired a letter of marque on 11 July 1801. He sailed from Portsmouth on 9 September, bound for Bombay and Bengal. Sovereign reached Cochin on 26 January 1802 and arrived at Bombay on 10 February. She then made an excursion, stopping at Surat at 1 April before returning to Bombay on 4 April. Continuing her voyage, she reached Anjengo on 17 April and arrived at Calcutta on 28 May. Homeward bound, she was at Culpee on 22 July and Madras on 1 October. She reached St Helena on 15 December and on 15 February 1803 arrived at the Downs.

On 14 March 1804 the EIC engaged Sovereign for four voyages at £13 13s per ton for 600 tons, plus £10 per ton for contingencies.

=== 2nd EIC voyage (1804–1805) ===
Captain Richard Meriton acquired a letter of marque on 12 June 1804. He sailed from Portsmouth on 10 July 1804 bound for Madras and Calcutta. Sovereign reached Madeira on 24 July Madeira and Calcutta on 8 December. Homeward bound, she was at Kedgeree on 10 January 1805 and Madras on 12 February. She reached St Helena on 20 July and arrived back at her moorings on 12 September. Captain Meriton died prior to August 1805, possibly in Bengal.

=== 3rd EIC voyage (1806–1807) ===
Captain Alexander Campbell acquired a letter of marque on 28 January 1806. He sailed from Portsmouth on 30 March, bound for Madras and Bengal. Sovereign was at São Tiago on 21 April, reached Madras on 27 August, and arrived at Calcutta on 27 September. Homeward bound, she was at Saugor on 1 February 1807 and Point de Galle on 15 March. She reached St Helena on 13 June and arrived at the Downs on 6 September.

=== 4th EIC voyage (1808–1809) ===
Captain Campbell sailed from Portsmouth on 15 April 1808, bound for Madras and Bengal. Sovereign reached Madras on 23 August and arrived at Calcutta on 14 September. Homeward bound, she was at Saugor on 10 January 1809 and Point de Galle on 7 February. She reached St Helena on 29 April and arrived at the Downs on 13 July.

=== 5th EIC voyage (1810–1811) ===
Captain Campbell sailed from Portsmouth on 13 April 1810, bound for Madras and Bengal. Sovereign was at São Tiago on 25 May, reached Madras on 28 August, and arrived at Calcutta on 3 October. Homeward bound, she was at Saugor on 7 December, reached St Helena on 20 March 1811, and arrived at the Downs on 13 July.

On 16 October 1811 the EIC engaged Sovereign for one voyage at £31 6s 8d per ton for 647 tons (bm).

=== 6th EIC voyage (1812–1813) ===
Captain Campbell sailed from Portsmouth on 8 April 1812, bound for Madras and Bengal. Sovereign reached Madras on 2 August, and arrived at Calcutta on 19 August. Homeward bound, she was the Eastern Channel on 7 January 1813, reached St Helena on 1 April, and arrived at the Downs on 5 June.

=== Transport ===
Next, Sovereign became a transport. On 25 August 1813, Sovereign, Bell, master, sailed to Quebec. She arrived there on 4 November.

Year	Master	Owner	Trade	Source & notes
1814	Bell	Lock & Co.	London transport	LR;
1816	Bell; F.Telfer	Lock & Co.	London transport London–St Helena	LR;

On 25 October 1815 the EIC engaged Sovereign for a voyage to China. The rate was £27 19s per ton for a direct voyage, and £29 5s for a circuitous one. The EIC rated Sovereign at 617 tons (bm) for purposes of the contract.

=== 7th EIC voyage (1816–1817) ===
Captain John Alexander Telfer sailed from the Downs on 26 March 1816, bound for China. Sovereign was at St Helena on 10 June, she reached Batavia on 30 September, and arrived at Whampoa Anchorage on 7 January 1817. Homeward bound, she crossed the Second Bar on 1 March, reached St Helena on 7 June, and arrived at the Downs on 8 August.

=== Merchantman ===
Lock sold Sovereign but her new owner continued to trade with India, but under a license from the EIC. On 21 April 1818 Captain R.J. Barton sailed for Bengal.

Year	Master	Owner	Trade	Source
1818	E.Telfer; Barton	Lock & Co. T. Ward	London–St Helena; London–India	LR; good repair 1818

Sovereign returned on 6 June 1819. It is not clear that she ever sailed again.

== Fate ==
On 17 September 1822 Sovereign;s register was cancelled as her had been completed.
