= Walthamstow (1799 EIC ship) =

History

East India CompanyGreat Britain
- Namesake: Walthamstow House, Walthamstow, Essex,
- Owner: Sir Robert Wigram, 1st Baronet
- Operator: East India Company
- Builder: Randall & Brent, Rotherhithe
- Launched: 13 December 1799
- Fate: Sold 1 June 1814 for breaking up

General characteristics
- Tons burthen: 823, or 824, or 871, or 87171/94, (bm)
- Length: Overall:146 ft 2 in (44.6 m); Keel:118 ft 7 in (36.1 m)
- Beam: 36 ft 1 3/4 in (11.0 m)
- Depth of hold: 14 ft 8 2/3 in (4.5 m)
- Complement: 1800:102; 1804:101; 1808:102
- Armament: 1800: 26 × 12- & 6-pounder guns; 1804: 30 × 12-pounder guns; 1808: 32 × 12-pounder guns

Walthamstow was launched in December 1799 in Rotherhithe. She made six voyages for the British East India Company (EIC). She was sold in 1814 for breaking up.

== Career ==
1st EIC voyage (1800–1801): Captain William Taylor Money acquired a letter of marque on 9 February 1800. He sailed from Portsmouth on 17 March, bound for Madras and China. Walthamstow reached Madras on 7 July, Penang on 23 August, and Malacca on 22 September, and arrived at Whampoa Anchorage on 5 November. Homeward bound, she crossed the Second Bar on 15 January 1801, reached St Helena on 15 April, and arrived at the Downs on 11 June.

2nd EIC voyage (1802–1803): Captain William Agnew sailed from the Downs on 6 March 1802, bound for Madras and Bengal. Walthamstow reached Madras on 24 June and arrived at Diamond Harbour on 4 July. Homeward bound, she left Diamond Harbour on 20 October and was at Saugor on 24 December. She reached St Helena on 3 March 1803, and arrived back at the Downs on 24 April.

3rd EIC voyage (1804–1805): Captain Donald Mcleod acquired a letter of marque on 2 March 1804. He sailed from Portsmouth on 8 May, bound for Ceylon and Bombay. Walthamstow arrived at Colombo on 2 October. She was at Point de Galle on 26 October and Caliccut on 10 November, and arrived at Bombay on 4 December. She sailed up to Surat, which she reached on 14 December, and returned to Bombay on 20 December. Homeward bound, she left Bombay on 15 February 1805 and was at Tellicherry on 22 February and Anjengo on 6 March. She was at Point de Galle on 15 March reached St Helena on 27 June, and arrived back at the Downs on 10 September.

4th EIC voyage (1806–1807): Captain MacLeod sailed from London on 4 March 1806 and from Portsmouth on 31 March, bound for St Helena and Bengal. She was at Santiago, Cape Verde (Sao Tiago), on 21 April, St Helena on 27 June, and the Cape on 26 August. she arrived at Diamond Harbour on 1o November. Homeward bound she was at Saugor on 30 December and left on 24 February 1807. She reached Point de Galle on 15 March and St Helena on 15 June, and arrived back at the Downs on 6 September.

5th EIC voyage (1808–1810): Captain Thomas Jones acquired a letter of marque on 30 July 1808. He sailed from Portsmouth on 17 September, bound for Madras and Bengal. Walthamstow was at reached Madeira on 29 September and arrived at Madras on 11 February 1809. She was at Trincomalee on 27 February, Colombo on 11 March, and back at Madras on 30 March. She then sailed north to Masulipatam (6 May), and Vizagapatam (13 May), and arrived at Diamond Harbour on 1 June. She then went up to Kidderpore on 18 July. Homeward bound, she left Kidderpore on 8 September and stopped at Saugor on 17 October. She left Saugor on 21 January 1810 and reached Madras on 4 February and Point de Galle on 16 February. She reached St Helena on 6 May and arrived back at the Downs on 6 July.

6th EIC voyage (1811–1813): Captain Jones sailed from Torbay on 31 May 1811, bound for Bengal. Walthamstow reached Madeira on 18 November, and arrive at Kedgeree on 18 November. She left Kedgeree on 22 February 1812 and stopped at Saugor on 9 April. Lloyd's List reported that Walthamstow had come out of dock in April and would proceed to Penang in April or early May. Although she was not listed among the vessels participating in the initial phase of the British invasion of Java (1811), her movements suggest that she was part of the logistical support.

Walthamstow left Saugor on 10 May and arrived at Penang, the marshaling point for the invasion fleet. She apparently waited there before sailing to Acheh, where she arrived on 13 August. She returned to Diamond Harbour on 2 September. Finally homeward bound, she was at Saugor on 16 October and sailed from there on 28 November. She reached St Helena on 14 February 1813 and arrived at the Downs on 14 May.

== Fate ==
When she returned the EIC determined that she was worn out. She was sold at Lloyd's Coffee House on 1 June 1814 for breaking up.
