= Borrowdale (disambiguation) =

Borrowdale is a valley in the English Lake District in Cumbria, England.

Borrrowdale may also refer to:

- Borrowdale, Westmorland, a valley in the southeast of the English Lake District
- Borrowdale, Harare, a suburb of Harare, Zimbabwe
- Borrowdale (ship), several British ships, including:
  - Borrowdale (1785 ship), a storeship of the First Fleet that sank in a storm in 1789
- Borrowdale, a 1985 Australian First Fleet-class ferry named for the 1785 ship, operating in Sydney Harbour
- Gary Borrowdale (born 1985), English footballer
