= Prince of Wales (1786 ship) =

Transport ship in the First fleet

History

Great Britain
- Name: Prince of Wales
- Namesake: George, Prince of Wales
- Owner: John Mather
- Port of registry: London
- Builder: Originally: Sidmouth; Rebuilt 1786: Christopher Watson and Co, Rotherhithe
- Launched: 1779
- Fate: Last listed 1810

General characteristics
- Type: Barque
- Tons burthen: 296, or 300, or 310, or 318, or 333, or 335, or 350, (bm) (Note: The reason for the discrepancies between different reports is that the calculation of burthen was complex, and owners and others may simply have provided reasonable approximations, or repairs may have resulted in material changes, or simply occasioned more careful calculation. All these numbers are noticeably smaller than the burthen of 389 tons that the length and breadth measurements yield.)
- Length: 103 ft (31.4 m)
- Beam: 29 ft 3 in (8.9 m)
- Propulsion: Sails
- Sail plan: Ship rig
- Boats & landing craft carried: longboat
- Complement: 1788:25; Privateer:100; Letter of Marque:40
- Armament: Privateer:20 × 6 & 9-pounder guns; Letter of marque:18 × 6-pounder guns (later 10 × 6-pounder guns); 1799: 6 × 4-pounder guns; 1801: 6 × 3-pounder guns; 1806: 6 × 6-pounder guns

Prince of Wales was a transport ship in the First Fleet, assigned to transport convicts for the European colonisation of Australia. Accounts differ regarding her origins; she may have been built and launched in 1779 at Sidmouth, or in 1786 on the River Thames. Her First Fleet voyage commenced in 1787, with 47 female convicts aboard, and she arrived at Botany Bay in January 1788. On a difficult return voyage in 1788–1789 she became separated from her convoy and was found drifting helplessly off Rio de Janeiro with her crew incapacitated by scurvy.

After Prince of Wales' return to Britain her owners deployed her as a whaler in the South Seas fisheries. She was later used as a privateer under a letter of marque, before performing a voyage as a slave ship. After a period under French control, she returned to Britain and was used to carry trade goods between London, the West Indies and the Mediterranean. The last records of her existence date to 1810; her fate thereafter is unknown.

== Origins ==
Prince of Wales was a square-sterned barque measuring between 300 and 350 tons burthen, being 103 feet (31 m) long and 31 feet (9.4 m) wide and with a height between decks of 5 feet 8 inches (1.73 m) amidships and 5 feet 9 inches (1.75 m) fore and aft.

Sources vary as to her origins. By one account, she was built in 1779 at Sidmouth, as a West Indiaman under the command of ship's master James Johnston. By another account, she was built on the River Thames in 1786, by the firm Christopher Watson and Company of Rotherhithe, which had also built HMS Sirius. Both accounts give her initial owner as Cornhill merchant John Mather, who had previously purchased and disposed of Captain Cook's Endeavour after that vessel had returned from Botany Bay. A Lloyd's Register entry from 1787 also records that Mather owned a vessel named Hannibal, which had been renamed from Prince of Wales.

== Voyage to Australia ==
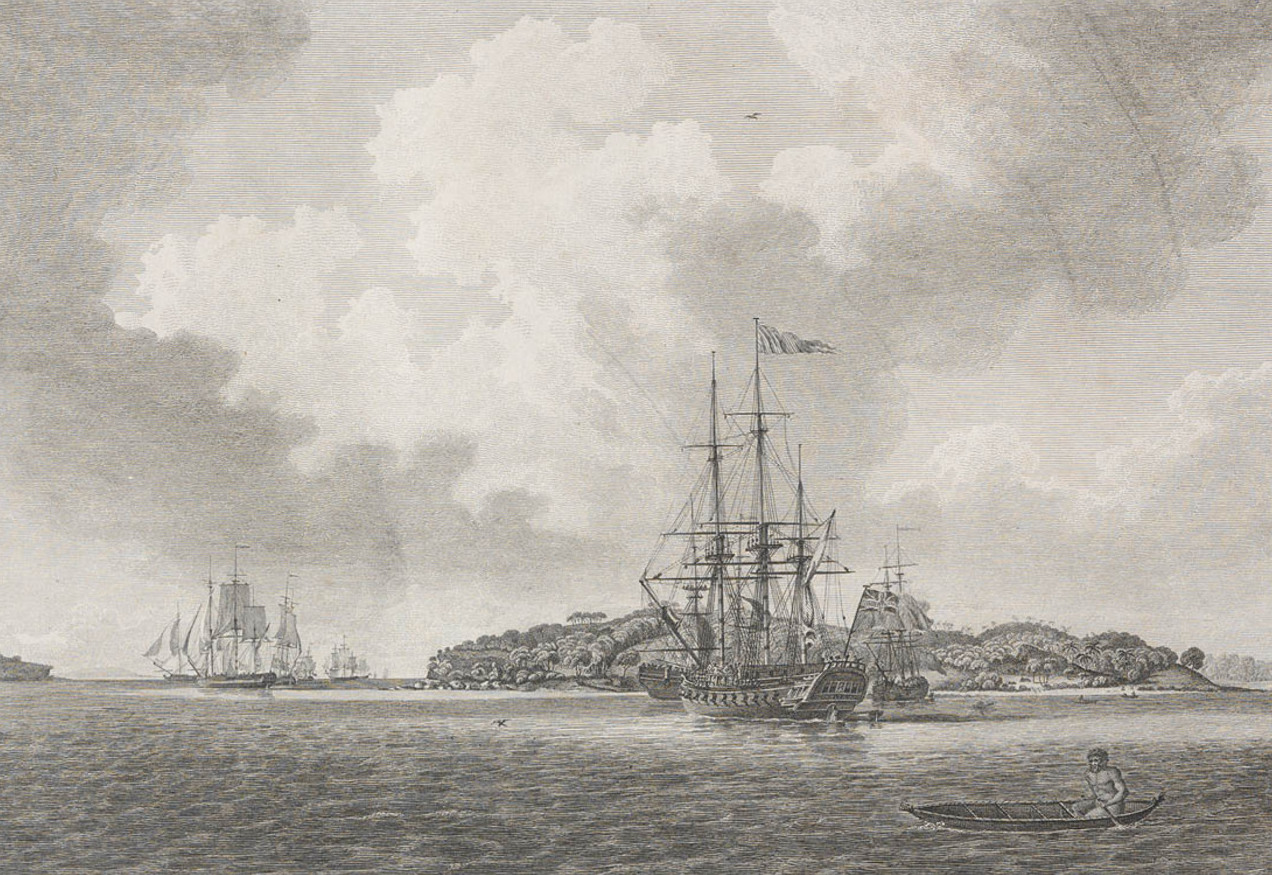
An engraving of the First Fleet in Botany Bay at voyage's end in 1788, from The Voyage of Governor Phillip to Botany Bay. Sirius is in the foreground; convict transports such as Prince of Wales are to the left.

The South London shipbroker William Richards contracted Prince of Wales in 1787 for the First Fleet voyage. Richards selected her after consultation with Royal Marine officers Watkin Tench and David Collins. Both officers would sail with the Fleet to Australia, Tench as a captain of marines, and Collins as judge-advocate for the new colony. She was the second-smallest of the First Fleet transports after Friendship, and the last to be contracted to join the voyage.

The Navy Board assigned Prince of Wales to the First Fleet on 2 March 1787 under the immediate command of ship's master John Mason, and the overall command of naval officer and future Governor of New South Wales, Arthur Phillip aboard Sirius. She was the last transport added to the Fleet before it sailed.

She left Portsmouth on 13 May 1787 with a crew of around 25. She was in company with the other vessels of the Fleet: five transports, three storeships, and two Royal Navy vessels. The 24-gun post ship HMS Hyaena accompanied the Fleet through the Channel as fleet escort, departing when the ships reached Atlantic waters. Prince of Wales arrived in Tenerife on 5 June, where she was resupplied. A second resupply took place in August in the Portuguese port of Rio de Janeiro, including the delivery aboard Prince of Wales of quantities of fresh fruit and vegetables, seeds, and some rum for the marines. Prince of Wales then turned southeast with the Fleet, reaching Cape Town in October and entering the Great Southern Ocean on 13 November for the last leg of the voyage to Australia. The first death among the crew occurred on the night of 24 November when a seaman fell overboard from the topsail yard and could not be rescued. A week later a second seaman, Yorgan Younginson, drowned after being washed overboard in heavy seas.

By mid-December the ship's supply of flour and butter for the voyage had been exhausted and Philip authorised Mason to broach the stores set aside for the future colony in order to continue to feed the convicts. A month later, on 20 January 1788, Prince of Wales reached Australia's Botany Bay. Six days later she sailed for Sydney Cove as part of the relocation of the convict settlement to Port Jackson. Leaving Botany Bay she collided with Friendship, losing her mainmast staysail and topsail, but the damage was swiftly repaired and she was able to enter Port Jackson in line with her fellow transports. There she landed 49 convicts, 31 marines and 23 civilians.

=== Convicts ===
Prince of Wales carried 49 female convicts on departure from Portsmouth. After five days at sea, 2 males were also brought across from Scarborough via Sirius, ringleaders of a failed mutiny. They remained aboard Prince of Wales for the remainder of the voyage to Australia.

Convict health was comparatively good during the voyage, with a report by Governor Philip showing only nine cases of illness aboard Prince of Wales by the time she reached Tenerife, the least for any First Fleet transport. (Note: From Phillip's report: 3 convicts were suffering from venereal disease, 3 convicts and 2 marines from "intermittent fever" and 1 convict from "fever.") Indeed, Phillip wrote to Admiralty advising that "the convicts are not so sickly as when we sailed," though the women aboard Prince of Wales had no new clothing and were still in the ragged apparel they had worn in prison. There was no ship's surgeon aboard but Chief Surgeon John White, periodically came on board from Sirius when weather and sailing conditions permitted. As the Fleet headed toward Rio in July, humid conditions and heavy rains generated a "plague of bugs" below decks with more than a hundred insects found in one small sleeping area alone. There were also reports of rats, fleas and lice, and an outbreak of scurvy in late December.

Despite this, serious illness remained rare and the first convict death was from accidental causes rather than disease. On 24 July the ship's longboat fell from a boom and struck 22-year-old Jane Bonner in the head; she died from her injuries six days later. A second convict, John Hartley, died of unknown causes on 5 August. The fact that Hartley was flogged, as punishment for the alleged planned mutiny, may have contributed to his poor health and subsequent death. These two deaths compared favourably with those on other transports, particularly Alexander; Alexander recorded 30 deaths, a consequence of overcrowding and an overflowing bilge.

Convict discipline was also well maintained, except for prostitution between the female convicts and the crew, which was rampant on Prince of Wales, Friendship and Lady Penrhyn. The first recorded punishment of a convict aboard Prince of Wales was in October 1787, nearly nine months after she had sailed; six lashes for a woman caught stealing from her fellows while they were "at prayer."

One female convict, thought to be Ellen Fraser (1764–1840) (née Redchester) was transferred from "Prince of Wales" to " Charlotte" on 13 August 1787 during the stop in Rio, where she joined her husband William Fraser who was a convict on the " Charlotte". Ellen gave birth to the second child of British parents in the colony (John Fraser).

=== Marines ===
The ship also carried a contingent of 31 marines of the New South Wales Marine Corps, comprising lieutenants Thomas Davey and Thomas Timins, five non-commissioned officers, and 24 privates. Sixteen of the marines embarked with their wives, and there were six children. Discipline was poor. In June 1787 two marines were court-martialed for disobeying orders; one received 300 lashes. Later in the voyage, two sergeants refused to share a mess after one insulted the other's wife. Drunkenness was also common. In June one drunken marine sergeant fell through an open hatchway and injured the pregnant wife of another marine, for which offence he was placed in legcuffs for two weeks and then transferred to Alexander. Then in late October, First Lieutenant James Maxwell, who had recently transferred aboard from Charlotte, was found incoherently drunk on duty and promptly returned to Charlotte.

Two more children were born to the wives of marines during the voyage. (Note: The seventh child was born on 29 August, while Prince of Wales was at sea; the eighth while the ship was anchored off Cape Town on 17 October.) In October 1787 the wife of marine drummer Benjamin Cook died from an unspecified illness and was buried at sea after a brief ceremony.

James Scott, a Sergeant of Marines, wrote an account of the voyage in his journals, now held at the State Library of New South Wales

=== Return to England ===
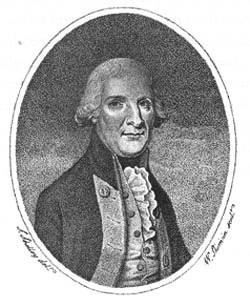
Lieutenant John Shortland, commander of convoy of First Fleet ships on the return voyage to England in 1788

Prince of Wales remained anchored in Sydney Cove for five months after her voyage, while her stores were unloaded. A shipboard inspection during this time found her hull was rotten with shipworm and on 23 May 1788 she was careened on the beach for repairs. In July she was released from government service and set sail for England on the 14th of that month, in convoy with her First Fleet sister ships Alexander, Borrowdale and Friendship, and under the overall command of Lieutenant John Shortland in Alexander.

The plan was that the convoy sail north to rendezvous at Lord Howe Island, then set a course broadly parallel to the Great Barrier Reef with the aim of reaching the Dutch port of Batavia. From there the convoy would sail west through the Sunda Straits to the Cape of Good Hope, then north through the Atlantic to England. This route was comparatively well mapped – the first part largely mirroring that of James Cook in his first voyage in the Pacific from 1768 to 1771, and the remainder from Batavia being the traditional route of Dutch East Indiamen returning to Europe. Shortland estimated the voyage would take the convoy between six and ten months.

This navigation plan was abandoned when both Prince of Wales and Borrowdale lost sight of Alexander and Friendship during a severe storm in late July, and found themselves alone and off course by the time the weather cleared. The two lost ships anchored while their masters, John Mason in Prince of Wales and Hobson Reed in Borrowdale, consulted. Neither considered it likely they could reach the Lord Howe Island rendezvous. They were also reluctant to hazard the voyage to Batavia through the Great Barrier Reef without Alexander in the lead. Instead, they agreed to turn their ships southeast into the open ocean and to return to England by sailing the other way around the world, via Cape Horn and Rio de Janeiro and then northeast across the Atlantic to Europe.

The Pacific weather proved favourable but by August the two ships had lost sight of each other and continued their voyage separately. On 23 August Prince of Wales rounded Cape Horn alone and headed northeast and north on a path to Rio. Throughout the voyage her crew had been heavily reliant on a diet of salted meat and by early September scurvy had incapacitated the majority. Mason died from the condition on 9 October, and another 13 men were too ill to leave their bunks. When Rio was finally sighted on 13 October the crew were too sick to bring the ship to port. She drifted helplessly in the outer harbor until Rio's harbourmaster sighted her the following morning and had additional seamen rowed out to assist. Twelve of Prince of Wales' sickest crew members were hospitalised in Rio while the remainder recovered on board.

A resupplied Prince of Wales set sail from Rio on Christmas Day 1788, completing an uneventful final leg to reach Falmouth in England on 25 March 1789. Despite the delays of disease, weather and an unfamiliar route, she was the first of the Fleet to return home, two months ahead of Alexander which did not reach England until 28 May.

== Whaler ==
Between 1790 and into 1793-4 Mather & Co. employed Prince of Wales as a whaler in the South Seas Fisheries, under the command of Captain F. Bolton. In 1790 she left for the Brazil Banks and Africa Grounds, but returned in November. (Note: The Brazil banks are the edge of the continental shelf south of latitude 16°S and to the east of the coast of South America.) By 10 August 1791 she was "All well" at Walwich (Walvis) Bay. In April 1792 Prince of Wales returned to England; she sailed again in July. She sailed around Cape Horn to Peru, but returned to England by late in 1793.

== Privateer ==
Mather & Co. sold Prince of Wales to Clayton Tarleton in 1793. Tarleton armed her with twenty 6-pounder guns and placed her under the command of William Scales. Scales received a letter of marque on 1 March 1793. The letter indicated that Prince of Wales had a crew of 100 men, many more than she needed to sail her, suggesting that Tarleton intended her to sail as a privateer.

Prince of Wales departed on a cruise and on 7 April she captured the French merchant vessel "Le Federatis", which was sailing from Cap-François to Bordeaux with a cargo valued at £40,000, or £32,000. Prince of Wales brought her prize into Hoylake a week later. (Note: Williams states that the captain of Prince of Wales was Thompson, not Scales, which is inconsistent with the letter of marque and other evidence. The item in Scots Magazine does not give the master's name.)

Plans changed, and Tarleton appointed Captain James Thomson (or Thompson) to command of Prince of Wales, with the intent of sailing her on the Liverpool-Africa trade, i.e., as a slaver. James Thomson received a letter of marque on 4 September 1793. His letter indicated that he would have a crew of 40 men.

In late 1793, Thompson sailed from Viana (probably Viana do Castello, Portugal), for Dartmouth, in company with Somme. On 8 October he captured Maryland, which was sailing from Baltimore to Bordeaux with a cargo of coffee, sugar, and barrel staves. He sent her into "Montserrat". In December he recaptured Best, which had been sailing from Lancaster to the West Indies when a French man-of-war had captured her. Thompson brought Best into the Mersey.

On 1 January 1794, Thomson spoke with a ship that was sailing for Botany Bay. The ship had encountered a French privateer, of 14 guns, which the British ship managed to drive off after an engagement that lasted almost two hours. Reportedly, Prince of Wales went on to recapture a British brig that a French 74-gun ship of the line had captured. Prince of Wales sent the brig into Oporto. However, this may have been Best. Lastly, in early 1974, Prince of Wales captured and brought in Flugen, of Malmö, which had been carrying wine, brandy, and bale goods from Bordeaux to Saint-Domingue.

== Slaver and capture ==
Later in 1794 a new captain replaced Thomson. Radcliffe Shimmin received a letter of marque on 11 June 1794. (Note: Shimmin was from the Isle of Man. A survey of Manx mariners lists him as her captain in 1794.) (Note: Lloyd's Register for 1795 gives the captain's name as R. Simons, but this is clearly an error.) A database of slave voyages by Liverpool-registered ships also names Shimmin as master of Prince of Wales. He sailed from Liverpool on 7 July 1794.

Shimmin's voyage was ill-fated. Lloyd's List reported that as Prince of Wales was approaching Barbados, having sailed from West Africa for the West Indies, she encountered a French privateer. The privateer, possibly fitted out in Baltimore, was armed with 28 guns and carried a crew of 300 men. She captured Prince of Wales and took her into Saint Thomas, then a Danish colony, and hence neutral. Shimmins had embarked 359 slaves and Prince of Wales landed 328 at St Croix, for a loss rate of 8.6%. The capture took place in late 1794 or early 1795. (Note: In 1796 Radcliffe Shimmins became captain of Tarleton and proceeded to sail her on three slave trading voyages. He and Tarleton were lost in 1798.)

Unsurprisingly, there is no listing for Prince of Wales in Lloyd's Register in 1796.

== British merchantman ==
What is perhaps more surprising is that Prince of Wales returned to British ownership. Her master is Andrews, her owner Bartly, and her trade London-Martinique. The process by which she returned to British ownership is currently obscure, but one suspects that the Royal Navy recaptured her in the West Indies, but so far evidence for the conjecture is lacking.

Barclay and Co. sailed Prince of Wales between the West Indies and London, and particularly Martinique and London, from 1797 to 1800. Lloyd's Register for (1800) shows that she underwent repairs in 1798 and a good repair and damages repaired in 1800. Her master changed from Andrews to Fairbridge, and her trade changed from London transport to London–Grenada. In 1801 Lloyd's Register recorded her owner as Fairbridge & Co., and her trade became London–Mediterranean. Fairbridge also upgraded her armament to six 6-pounder guns. Lloyd's Register for 1805 recorded her master as Stoker and her trade as London–St Vincent. Prince of Wales also received a large repair and new deck and sides in 1804.

She was still listed as sailing in 1810. The Register of Shipping for 1810 gives the name of her master as Mathewson, her owner "M-rdeau", and her trade as London–Memel. She had undergone a thorough repair in 1808. Both Registers give her launch year as 1779, at Sidmouth.

Confusion about her origins continues in 1815. The Register of Shipping gives a launch year of 1799 at Sidmouth, but with her having been rebuilt in 1786. Her master is S. Robson, her owner is Fenwick, and her trade is London–Quebec. Lloyd's Register gives her place of launch as the Thames River and has no launch date. It gives her master as S. Robson, her owner as Fenwick, and her trade as London transport.

== Lloyd's Register ==
Lloyd's Register is only as accurate as the information owners gave it, and there are discrepancies between the entries for vessels and information from other sources. That said, there is generally a strong correspondence between the information in Lloyd's Register, and other sources, at least with respect to Prince of Wales.

Year	Master	Owner	Trade	Notes
1787	J. Mason	J. Mather	London - Botany Bay	300 tons (bm); almost rebuilt 1786; named Hannibal in 1786
1789	J. Mason	J. Mather	London-Botany Bay	300 tons (bm); almost rebuilt 1786
1790	J. Mason; Illegible	J. Mather	London-Botany Bay; London - South Seas Fisheries	300 tons (bm); almost rebuilt 1786
1791	F. Bolton	J. Mather	London-Botany Bay; London - South Seas Fisheries	300 tons (bm); almost rebuilt 1786
1792	F. Bolton	J. Mather	London-South Seas Fisheries	300 tons (bm); almost rebuilt 1786
1793	F. Bolton; Thompson	C. Tarleton	London-South Seas Fisheries; Liverpool-Africa	300 tons (bm); almost rebuilt 1786; 18 × 6-pounder guns
1794	Thompson	C. Tarlton	Liverpool-Africa	300 tons (bm); almost rebuilt 1786; 18 × 6-pounder guns
1795	R. Simons	C. Tarlton	Liverpool-Africa	300 tons (bm); almost rebuilt 1786; 10 × 6-pounder guns
1796				Not listed
1797	Andrews	Bartly & Co.	London-Martinique	300 tons (bm); almost rebuilt 1786
1798	J. Andrews	Barclay	London-Martinque	318 tons (bm); almost rebuilt 1786 - part old materials; 6 × 4-pounder guns
1799	J. Andrews	Barclay	London-Martinque	318 tons (bm); almost rebuilt 1786 - part old materials; 6 × 4-pounder guns
1800	J. Andrews	Barclay	London transport London-Grenada	318 tons (bm); almost rebuilt 1786 - part old materials; 6 × 4-pounder guns
1801	Farbridge	Fairbridge	London - Mediterranean	318 tons (bm); almost rebuilt 1786 - part old materials; 6 × 3-pounder guns
1802	Farbridge	Fairbridge	London - Mediterranean	318 tons (bm); almost rebuilt 1786 - part old materials
1803	Farbridge	Fairbridge	London - Mediterranean	318 tons (bm); almost rebuilt 1786 - part old materials
1804	Farbridge	Fairbridge	London - Mediterranean	318 tons (bm); almost rebuilt 1786 - part old materials
1805	Stoker	Fairbridge	London - St Vincent	318 tons (bm); 6 × 6-pounder guns; new deck and sides; large repair
1806	Stoker	Fairbridge	London - St Vincent	318 tons (bm); 6 × 6-pounder guns; new deck and sides; large repair
1807	Stoker	Fairbridge	London - St Vincent	318 tons (bm); 6 × 6-pounder guns; new deck and sides; large repair
1808	Stoker	Fairbridge	London - St Vincent	318 tons (bm); 6 × 6-pounder guns; new deck and sides; large repair
1809	Stoker	Fairbridge	London - St Vincent	318 tons (bm); 6 × 6-pounder guns; new deck and sides; large repair
1810	Stoker	Fairbridge	London - St Vincent	318 tons (bm); 6 × 6-pounder guns; new deck and sides; large repair

== See also ==
- Journals of the First Fleet
- List of convicts on the First Fleet
