= King George (1797 ship) =

Liverpool slave ship (1797–1803)

History

Great Britain
- Name: King George
- Acquired: 1797 by purchase of a prize
- Fate: Wrecked February 1803

General characteristics
- Tons burthen: 400, or 416 (bm)
- Complement: 1798:50; 1799:30; 1800:25
- Armament: 1798:16 × 12-pounder guns; 1799:16 × 12-pounder guns; 1800:16 × 12-pounder guns

King George was a French ship that the British captured circa 1797. Her new owners renamed her and employed her as a Liverpool-based slave ship. She made three complete voyages in the triangular trade, transporting enslaved peoples from Africa to the West Indies. She was lost on her fourth voyage in February 1803 as she returned to Liverpool after having delivered captives to Havana.

== Career ==
King George first appeared in Lloyd's Register in the volume for 1798. It showed her master as Phillips, her ownership as being Liverpool, and her voyage as London to Liverpool.

=== 1st voyage transporting enslaved people (1798–1799) ===
Captain Samuel Hensley acquired a letter of marque on 13 February 1798. He sailed from Liverpool on 20 March. In 1798, 160 vessels sailed from English ports, bound for Africa and the transportation of enslaved people; 149 sailed from Liverpool.

King George acquired captives at the Congo River. She arrived at Demerara on 10 September with 540 captives. She left Demerara on 4 October and arrived back at Liverpool on 4 January 1799. She had left Liverpool with 54 crew members and she suffered three crew deaths on the voyage.

=== 2nd voyage transporting enslaved people (1799–1800) ===
Captain Radcliffe Shimmins acquired a letter of marque on 5 March 1799. (Note: Shimmins was an experienced captain of slave ships. He had sailed Prince of Wales on one voyage where a French privateer captured her. He had also captained Tarleton on three voyages, being wrecked late in 1798 on the third.) He sailed from Liverpool on 6 April 1799 to acquire captives from the West Coast of Africa. In 1799, 156 vessels sailed from English ports, bound for Africa and the transportation of enslaved people; 134 sailed from Liverpool.

King George arrived with 394 captives at Demerara on 18 March 1800. She departed Demerara on 11 April and arrived at Liverpool on 21 June. She had left with 54 crew members and she suffered 16 deaths on the voyage.

=== 3rd voyage transporting enslaved people (1800–1802) ===
Captain Cobb Taylor acquired a letter of marque on 4 September 1800. He sailed from Liverpool on 6 November 1800. In 1800, 133 vessels sailed from English ports, bound for Africa and the transportation of enslaved people; 120 sailed from Liverpool.

King George arrived at Demerara on 6 September 1801, with some 300 captives. Lloyd's List (LL) reported that she had grounded on the Demerara Bar on 25 September as she sailed for England, but that she was expected to be gotten off slight damage. (Note: The news item gave the master's name as Skimmins.) She sailed from Demerara on 13 November 1801 and arrived back at Liverpool on 18 January 1802. She had left Liverpool with 45 crew members and she had suffered 10 crew deaths on the voyage.

=== 4th voyage transporting enslaved people (1802–1802) ===
Captain James Phillips sailed from Liverpool on 19 May 1802. Because he sailed during the Peace of Amiens he did not acquire a letter of marque. In 1802, 147 vessels sailed from English ports, bound for Africa and the transportation of enslaved people; 122 sailed from Liverpool.

King George acquired captives at Bonny and arrived with 388 at Havana on 1 December 1802. She had sailed with 39 crew members and had lost two by the time she reached Havana. She sailed from Havana on 30 December 1802.

== Fate ==
In February 1803 King George, Phillips, was wrecked on the West Hoyle Bank, in Liverpool Bay. She was on a voyage from Havana to Liverpool.
