= James Scott (marine) =

British Marine and diarist

- Died: 1796; Portsmouth, United Kingdom
- Occupations: New South Wales Marine; Farmer
- Title: Sergeant
- Spouse: Jane Boxall (m. 1786–1796)
- Children: Elizabeth Scott (born 1787); William Scott (born 1790)

James Scott (died 1796) was a Sergeant of Marines in the New South Wales Marine Corps and commander of the first quarter guard in New South Wales. He is notable for his journal describing his experiences in the First Fleet, which established the first European settlement in Australia in 1788.

== Colonial service ==
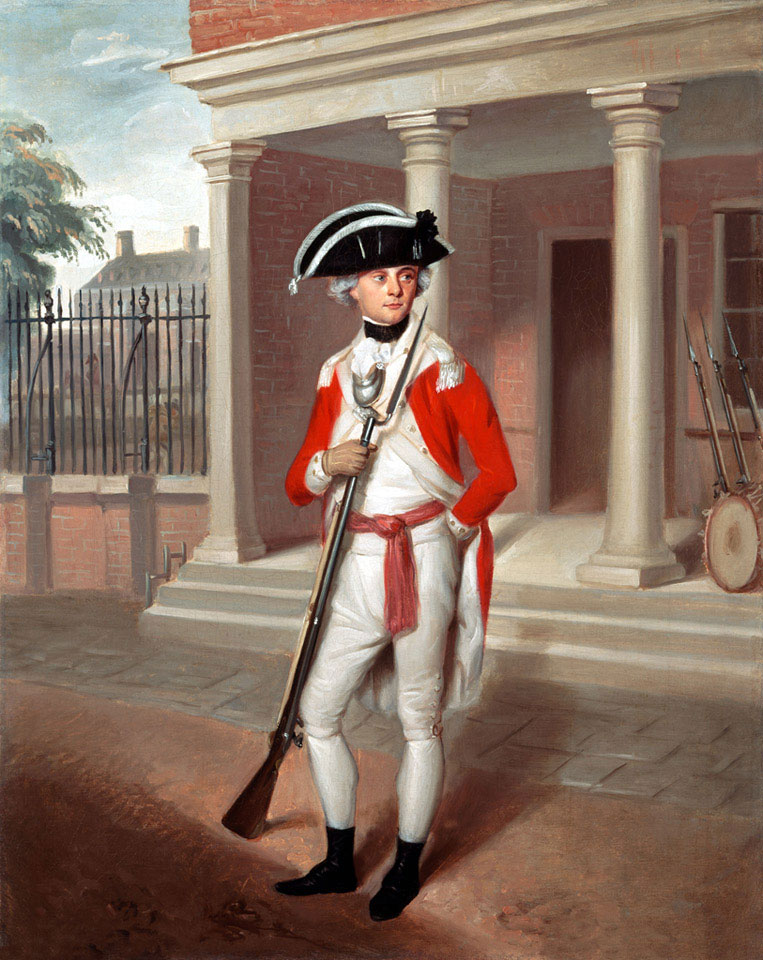
A British marine officer, c. 1780

Scott was on board the Prince of Wales which left Portsmouth on 13 May 1787 with the other vessels of the First Fleet. He took with him his wife Jane, (Note: Maiden name Jane Boxall, a resident of Portsea who married James Scott on 26 October 1786, eight months before the Fleet sailed.) who was pregnant with their first child.

The voyage was not an entirely happy one. On 30 June 1787 Scott allegedly insulted the wife of fellow marine sergeant John Hume, after which Hume refused to share a mess with him. A week later sergeant John Kennedy became so drunk on duty that he fell through an open hatchway and injured Scott's wife, for which offence Kennedy was placed in legcuffs for two weeks and then transferred to Alexander. Despite her injuries Jane was well enough to go ashore when the Fleet reached Rio de Janeiro, returning to the ship before it departed for the Cape of Good Hope. She gave birth to a healthy daughter, Elizabeth, on board Prince of Wales on 29 August 1787.

The Fleet arrived in New South Wales in January 1788, with the Marines disembarking first at Botany Bay. Six days later they reboarded the ships for the voyage to Port Jackson, where they were reorganised into four companies under the commands of Captains James Campbell and John Shea, and Captain-Lieutenants Watkin Tench and James Meredith. Scott was assigned to Campbell's company alongside fellow sergeants Isaac Knight and Edward Devan, and was named commander of the settlement's quarter guard.

On 15 April 1789 he was the first to report an outbreak of smallpox among the Aboriginal population at Sydney Cove, when he and a party of convicts encountered a man and two boys with clear symptoms of the disease. Scott's report was provided to Governor Arthur Phillip and surgeon John White, who hastened to the spot but found that one of three had already died. The two survivors were taken to the settlement for medical care.

In addition to his Marine duties, Scott turned his hand to farming and accompanied several expeditions into the hinterland behind Sydney Cove. A son William was born in Sydney in 1790. Scott's relations with his fellow settlers was harmonious throughout his term of service. The single exception was in 1791 when Martha Davis, the wife of Private John Davis, was arrested after publicly calling Jane Scott a whore. Martha later claimed she was provoked and was released after making a formal apology. Somewhat to Scott's discredit he was on duty as the settlement's lookout on the night in March 1791 when William and Mary Bryant escaped Sydney Cove by boat, in company with seven other convicts and two small children.

== Return to England ==
Scott and his family returned to England on HMS Gorgon in 1791 – a member of the last company of the New South Wales Marine Corps to leave Australia. He was discharged from the New South Wales Marines at Spithead in June 1792, and rejoined the British Marines at the same location. From 1792 to 1796 he served as a Marine squad sergeant at Portsmouth, earning £20 a year. (Note: This equates to a relative annual wage of £25,500 in 2014 terms.)

He died in Portsmouth, England in March 1796 and was buried on 2 April.

== Legacy ==
His account of the voyage and his time in the colony, entitled Remarks on a passage Botnay [i.e. Botany] bay 1787 has survived and covers the dates 13 May 1787 – 20 May 1792. In his journal he records that he commanded the Quarter Guard, looked after pigs and poultry, and after arriving at Sydney searched for a lost marine in the bush. During the voyage, he records that a convict attempted to escape at Tenerife.

The diary was published in 1963 as Remarks on a passage to Botany Bay, 1787–1792 : a First Fleet Journal.

== See also ==
- Journals of the First Fleet

== Bibliography ==
- Chapman, Don (1986). 1788: The People of the First Fleet. Doubleday Australia. ISBN 0868242659.
- Keneally, Thomas (2006). The Commonwealth of Thieves. Random House. ISBN 9781741666137.
- Moore, John (1989). The First Fleet Marines. University of Queensland Press. ISBN 0702220655.
