= Fishburn (1780 ship) =

Storeship of First Fleet

History

Great Britain
- Name: Fishburn
- Owner: Leighton Co.
- Launched: 1780, Whitby

General characteristics
- Tons burthen: 378, or 400 (bm)
- Length: 103 ft (31 m)
- Beam: 29 ft (8.8 m)
- Sail plan: Ship rig
- Complement: 22
- Armament: 6 guns

Fishburn was built at Whitby in 1780. the largest of the three First Fleet storeships. According to her 1786 Deptford survey, she was 6 feet 1 inch (1.85 m) between decks afore, 5 feet 9 inches (1.75 m) midships and 7 feet 1 inch (2.16 m) abaft.

== Career ==
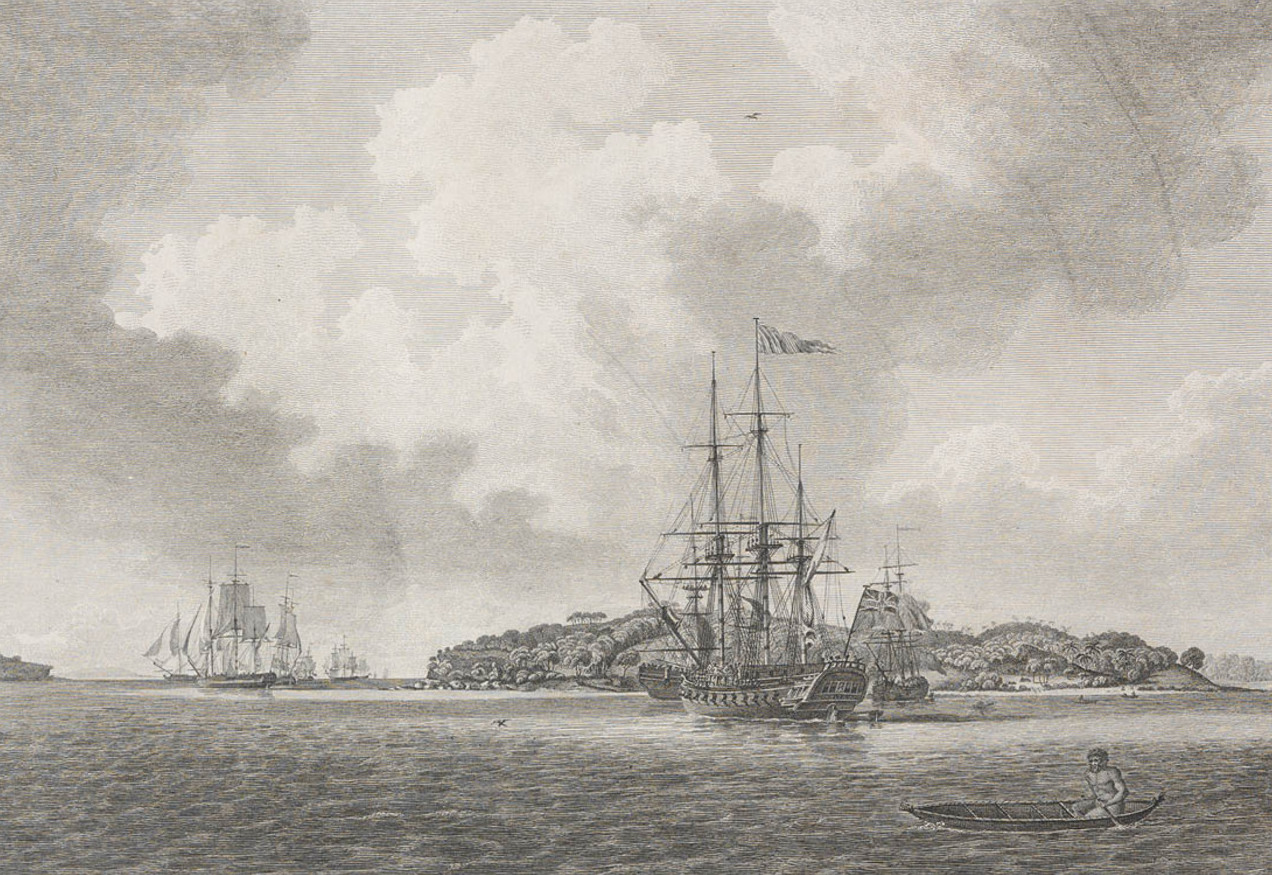
An engraving of the First Fleet in Botany Bay at voyage's end in 1788, from The Voyage of Governor Phillip to Botany Bay.

Fishburn appeared in the 1781 volume of Lloyd's Register with Gill, master, J.Pierton, owner, and trade Cork-based transport. Lloyd's List reported on 15 March 1785 that Fishburn had been driven on the Jarron Slake, but that it was hoped she would be gotten off with little damage.

In 1777 she became a storeship with the First Fleet to Botany Bay. Her master for the voyage to Botany Bay was Robert Brown, and she was owned by Leighton Co., who were also the owners of Golden Grove and Borrowdale. Fishburn carried 22 crew, though five deserted before the vessel departed England. The shortfall was made up through forced transfers from HMS Hyaena, the Royal Navy escort ship that accompanied the Fleet for the first three hundred miles of its voyage.

Fishburn left Portsmouth on 13 May 1787, and arrived at Port Jackson on 26 January 1788. She left Port Jackson on 19 November 1788, keeping company with Golden Grove until losing sight of her on 11 April 1789 after several days at the Falkland Islands for recovery of crew members who were sick with scurvy. She arrived back in England on 25 May 1789. The fate of Fishburn is unknown; she appears to have disappeared from the records after being discharged from Her Majesty's service at Deptford, nine days after her arrival. There is a monument to Fishburn in the First Fleet Memorial Gardens at Wallabadah, New South Wales. An Urban Transit Authority First Fleet ferry was named after Fishburn in 1985.

== See also ==
- Journals of the First Fleet
