= James Maxwell (British Marines officer) =

British Marines officer

James Maxwell (died 1792) was an officer in the British Marines and member of Australia's First Fleet which established a penal colony in New South Wales in 1788.

A long-serving Marine officer prior to joining the Fleet, Maxwell arrived in the colony and served there for some 6 months but was incapacitated by a combination of dysentery and a disease of the optic nerves. He was invalided back to England in July 1788 and died in Stonehouse, Plymouth in 1792.

== Military service ==
Maxwell joined the Plymouth Company of the British Marines and was commissioned 2nd lieutenant of the 36th Company on 16 February 1776. He was promoted to 1st lieutenant of 94th (Plymouth) two years later, on 11 April 1778 (per Adm 192/3 p12).

=== Voyage to Australia ===
The NSW Marines were established in late 1786 to preserve "subordination and regularity" in the proposed penal colony in Botany Bay, Australia Maxwell embarked for Australia aboard First Fleet convict transport Lady Penrhyn on 12 May 1787. As the oldest lieutenant and the longest serving at that rank, he was listed first among his peers in the returns of Marine officers aboard the Fleet. During the voyage to Botany Bay, Maxwell was transferred first to Prince of Wales then on 19 October 1787 to Charlotte. In the Journal of Ralph Clarke, Maxwell was recorded on Prince of Wales, 3 September "Then ther[e] is old Maxwell who is drinking himself to death as fast as he well can..." It was not long after this that Maxwell was ordered aboard Charlotte in exchange for Lieutenant John Creswell of 64th (Plymouth).

The voyage posed difficulties for Maxwell in enforcing discipline among the Marines. On 24 June 1787 he was aboard the transport ship Prince of Wales when he was greeted with insolence and disobedience by Marine privates Arthur Dougherty and Robert Ryan. (Note: Arthur Dougherty, Marine private, enlisted in 1787 and travelled to NSW with his wife Judith. Both were inveterate drunkards and were jailed for six days each in Port Jackson as a consequence of insolence and incompetence during the voyage to Australia. Upon release Dougherty was attached to Captain Meredith's company. He completed his enlistment and returned to England on HMS Gorgon in 1791. Judith accompanied him but died on the voyage home.) (Note: Robert Ryan, Marine private, enlisted in 1787 and assigned to Captain Shea's company in Port Jackson. In February 1788 he took a convict wife, Frances Williams, who was serving a life sentence for theft. They had one daughter. On expiry of his enlistment in 1791, Ryan chose to remain in Australia as a settler on Norfolk Island.) Maxwell had both men arrested and taken to Fleet flagship HMS Sirius. A court martial was convened on the following day; it acquitted Dougherty but sentenced Ryan to 300 lashes, delivered immediately. Two weeks later, Maxwell arrested Marine Sergeant John Kennedy from Prince of Wales, who was so drunk on duty that he fell through an open hatchway and injured the wife of another Marine. Kennedy was held in legcuffs for three weeks, then court martialled and transferred to the Alexander - a hardship post as that vessel suffered from fever, overcrowding and an overflowing bilge.

In July 1788 Maxwell requested his return to England due to problems with eyesight. Along with 2nd Lieut William Collins, Maxwell was invalided home to England from Port Jackson on Alexander 14 Jul 1788.(per Letters to Secretary Stephens, 9 Jul 1788 - HR NSW Vol II p144-5, 194). He died on 2 March 1792 at the Marine barracks in Stonehouse, Plymouth.
