= David Collins (lieutenant governor) =

British military officer and colonial administrator (1756–1810)

Colonel David Collins
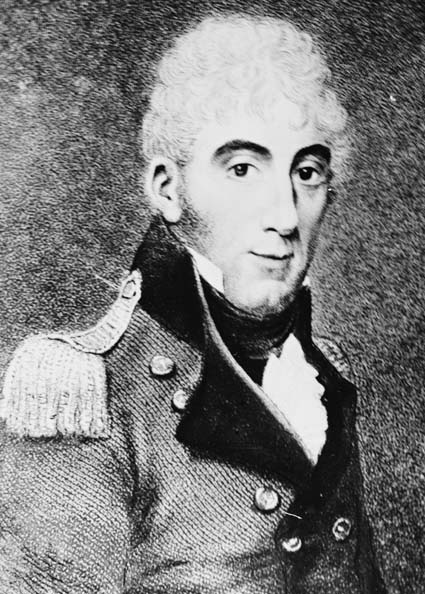

1st Lieutenant Governor of Van Diemen's Land
- In office 16 February 1804 – 24 March 1810
- Governor: Philip Gidley King; William Bligh; Lachlan Macquarie
- Preceded by: Position Established
- Succeeded by: Colonel Thomas Davey

1st Judge Advocate of New South Wales
- In office 24 October 1786 – August 1796
- Governor: Arthur Phillip; John Hunter
- Preceded by: Position Established
- Succeeded by: Richard Bowyer Atkins

Personal details
- Born: 3 March 1756 London, England
- Died: 24 March 1810 (aged 54) Hobart Town, Van Diemen's Land
- Spouse: Maria Stuart Collins née Proctor

Colonel David Collins (3 March 1756 – 24 March 1810) was a British military officer and colonial administrator who was appointed as the first Judge-Advocate to the British colony of New South Wales. He sailed with Governor Arthur Phillip on the First Fleet and assisted in the founding of what is now known as the city of Sydney. He became secretary to the Governor and was later tasked with establishing a secondary colony in Port Phillip. Collins deemed the site unsatisfactory and transferred this settlement to Van Diemen's Land (later known as Tasmania), where he was appointed Lieutenant Governor and founded the city of Hobart.

== Early life and military career ==
David Collins was born 3 March 1756 in London, the third and oldest surviving child of Arthur Tooker Collins (1718–1793), an officer of marines (later major-general) and Henrietta Caroline née Fraser (died 1807) of King's County, Ireland. His grandfather Arthur Collins (1684–1760) was author of Collins's Peerage of England.

The family lived in Saffron Hill, London, until 1765 when they moved to Devon after his father as a lieutenant colonel was made commandant of the Plymouth division of marines. Collins was educated at Exeter Grammar School, before at the age of 14 joining the marines as an ensign in his father's division. He was promoted second lieutenant on 20 February 1771. In 1772 Collins was serving aboard the frigate HMS Southampton when it was sent to Denmark to retrieve King George III's sister Queen Caroline Matilda after she was banished from Denmark for an illicit romance.

=== American Revolutionary War ===
In March 1775, Collins sailed to Boston, Massachusetts, with two battalions of marines, to help the Governor of Massachusetts Thomas Gage reinforce the town. Collins was named second lieutenant to Captain Thomas Lindsay in the third company of the First Battalion of Marines. On 17 June, Collins took part in General William Howe's bayonet charge and capture of Breed's Hill in the Battle of Bunker Hill to hold the heights of Charlestown. He was promoted to first lieutenant the following week.

On 17 March 1776, the British evacuated from Boston to Halifax, Nova Scotia. Here he met Maria Stuart Procter, the daughter of Captain Charles Procter, whom he married on 13 June 1777. Collins's battalion was recalled to England in 1777, where Collins became adjutant of the battalion at Chatham. He was promoted captain-lieutenant in August 1779, and captain in July 1780. In February 1781, Collins was posted as captain for a detachment of marines aboard the 74-gun HMS Courageux in the Channel Squadron commanded by Admiral Richard Howe, where he took part in the relief of Gibraltar. In September 1783 Collins was put onto half-pay.

== Colonial Administration ==
=== Judge Advocate of New South Wales ===
In October 1786, after three years on half-pay stationed at Chatham, Collins volunteered for service in the proposed penal colony of New South Wales. On 29 November, and despite a lack of legal training, he was named Judge Advocate for the new colony and chief judge for a military court administering the New South Wales Marine Corps. In May 1787 he sailed aboard the First Fleet, reaching Sydney Cove in January 1788.

Collins presided over the first criminal court in New South Wales on 11 February. Three convicts were found guilty with one being sentenced to 150 lashes. Later that month the military court headed by Collins condemned another convict, Thomas Barrett, to death by hanging. Barrett was the first person legally executed in colonial New South Wales.

In 1789, Collins's court sentenced John Ruglass to 700 lashes for stabbing a woman, and condemned six soldiers to death for theft. Later that year, the court sentenced convict Ann Davis to death for stealing, becoming the first woman executed in the colony. In September 1789, Collins sentenced a soldier to death for the "heinous offence" of the rape of an 8 year old girl; however "being recommended by the court to the governor", the soldier's sentence was commuted to life imprisonment at the Norfolk Island penal colony by Governor Phillip.

In 1793, two soldiers were sentenced to 500 and 800 lashes respectively for being absent without leave. In 1795, a spate of gang rapes resulted in several settlers and convicts being sentenced to punishment of up to 1,000 lashes.

Collins was also appointed as Secretary to the Colony of New South Wales. Collins filled the three roles of Secretary, Judge Advocate and Lieutenant Governor until he left the colony for England in 1796.

Collins took a strong interest in observing and recording the events that occurred during these early years of the British colony of New South Wales. He published an important two volume book called An Account of the English Colony of New South Wales which detailed the happenings from the voyage of the First Fleet in 1787 up to the departure of Governor Hunter in 1800. This text, in particular, remains a significant source of information about the culture and customs of the local Indigenous people, and their interaction and conflict with the colonists. Collins maintained a good relationship amongst the Indigenous Eora people. So much so that a man called Gnunga Gnunga Murremurgan took on his name and was known simply as "Collins".

=== Sullivan Bay settlement, Port Phillip ===
Collins was tasked with establishing the first, short-lived settlement at Sullivan Bay on Port Phillip in what is now the state of Victoria. He sailed from England in April aboard HMS Calcutta with over 400 convicts and marines, arriving at Port Phillip in September 1803 to found a penal colony.

Whilst landing at Sullivan Bay near present-day Sorrento, the colonists encountered a group of Boonwurrung Indigenous Australians whom they pursued, shot at and then burnt down their huts, killing one of them. Collins later attempted to placate the situation with the offering of blankets and biscuits.

Collins also sent First Lieutenant James Hingston Tuckey of the Calcutta to explore Port Phillip. Tuckey subsequently had a skirmish with around 200 Aborigines at Corio Bay. Tuckey's report together with other information obtained, advised Collins that there were better places around Port Phillip to establish a colony but, as Collins reported to London, he realised that these areas were "full of natives" and that he would "require four times the strength" of his current armed forces to displace them.

With his own dissatisfaction at the lack of fresh water and arable land at Sullivan Bay, together with his inability to force Aboriginal people out of more ideal sites, Collins was prompted to write to Governor King, seeking permission to remove the settlement. When King agreed, Collins decided in early 1804 to move the colony to the Derwent River, on the island of Van Diemen's Land (Tasmania).

During their few months at Sullivan Bay, around 18 colonists died and seven convicts absconded. One of these run-aways, William Buckley, survived and lived a mostly traditional Aboriginal lifestyle until the British returned in 1835.

=== Lieutenant Governor of Van Diemen's Land ===
Collins arrived at the Derwent River with most of the evacuees from Port Phillip in February 1804 on board the vessel Ocean. He knew that Lieutenant John Bowen had already established a military outpost on the Derwent five months previously at Risdon Cove and was aware there was ample food and water in the region to support a settlement.

Instead of combining with Bowen's outpost at Risdon Cove, Collins chose to establish a new settlement on the opposite side of the Derwent at a site with a good supply of fresh water, which he called Sullivans Cove after a colonial administrator named John Sullivan. This settlement soon became the town of Hobart, which Collins named in honour of the British Secretary of State for war and the colonies Lord Hobart.

In May 1804, the soldiers of the New South Wales Corps stationed at Risdon Cove conducted a massacre of Aboriginal people. In response, Collins ordered the closure of the Risdon Cove settlement and returned the detachment of soldiers to Sydney. Governor King also gave Collins jurisdictional authority over the whole of the island with the title of Lieutenant Governor of Van Diemen's Land.

The nascent settlement at Hobart remained largely ignored by the colonial administrators in London, and Collins was forced into a situation of self-sufficiency. As a result, the convicts became important workers and food gatherers for the population at Hobart, with Collins displaying leniency toward them. Convict kangaroo hunters who journeyed into the interior regions played a significant role in providing food. Collins turned a blind eye when these hunters either came into conflict with Aboriginal people or when corrupt officials like his second-in-charge, Edward Lord, profited immensely from controlling the trade in kangaroo meat.

Some of the convicts who ventured into the rural grasslands maintained by Aboriginal firestick farming during Collins's administration were able to live beyond the reach of colonial authority and became influential bushrangers who had significant power in the supply of food to the settlements.

== Death ==
Collins died suddenly in 1810 after a short illness while still in office as the Lieutenant-Governor of Van Diemen's Land. He was buried in what is now St David's Park in Hobart.

Collins left no published account of his work as Lieutenant-Governor at Port Phillip, nor later as the founder of Hobart due to his deputy, Lieutenant Edward Lord, methodically burning all government documentation soon after Collins's death.

== Legacy ==
The name of St David's Church, Hobart and St David's Park was chosen to commemorate Colonel David Collins.

Collins Street, Melbourne was named in his honour.

His name has also been given to Collinsvale in Tasmania, Collins Parade in Sorrento (adjacent to the site of the failed settlement) and to Collins Street, Hobart.

Collins was portrayed by David Dawson in the 2015 TV series Banished.

== See also ==
- First Fleet
- Journals of the First Fleet

== Citations ==
Preceded by new position	Lieutenant Governor of Van Diemen's Land; 1804–1810	Succeeded by Colonel Thomas Davey
