= Tarleton (1796 ship) =

British slave ship (1796–1798)

History

Great Britain
- Name: Tarleton
- Owner: Tarleton & Co.
- Builder: Liverpool
- Launched: 1796
- Fate: Lost late 1798

General characteristics
- Tons burthen: 260, or 261 (bm)
- Propulsion: Sail
- Complement: 20
- Armament: 1796:10 × 6-pounder guns; 1797:16 × 4-pounder + 6 × 6-pounder guns

Tarleton was launched in 1796 at Liverpool for Tarleton & Co., a Liverpool firm that had been in the slave trade for three generations. She made two full voyages as a slave ship in the triangular trade in enslaved people before she was wrecked on a third voyage in late 1798. On her first voyage she repelled two attacks by French privateers in single-ship actions. Unusually, but not uniquely, slaves helped work her guns.

== Career ==
Radcliffe Shimmins, Tarleton's master, received a letter of marque on 13 May 1796. (Note: Radcliffe Shimmins had been captain of Prince of Wales in 1794 when a French privateer had captured them as they were carrying slaves to the West Indies.) She proceeded to make three cruises as a slaver between 1796 and 1798.

On her first enslaving voyage, Shimmins sailed Tarleton from Liverpool on 19 June 1796.

In 1796, 103 British vessels left British ports on enslaving voyages. Ninety-four of these vessels sailed from Liverpool.

Tarleton arrived at Loanga on 25 August. She left Africa on 26 October.

On 28 November Tarleton drove off a French privateer of 12 guns with a single broadside, and later that day succeeded in repelling another after an engagement of three hours. This second privateer mounted twenty 9-pounder guns on her main deck, and eight guns on her quarterdeck. Shimmins and his men, including some captives that helped man the guns, sustained no casualties. Tarleton was approaching Barbados at the time and the next day arrived there.

Tarleton arrived at Martinique on 13 December. She had embarked 394 captives and disembarked 380, for a mortality rate of 3.6%. Tarleton left Martinique on 9 January 1797 and arrived back at Liverpool on 13 April. On her voyage she had also lost four crew members; she had left Liverpool with 37 crew members.

On his second enslaving voyage, in 1797, Shimmins gathered his captives in the Bight of Biafra at Bonny Island and Gulf of Guinea island, and delivered them to St. Vincent. He had arrived with 435. (Note: The Dolben Act mandated a limit of 400 slaves per voyage for Tarleton. On her previous voyage she had been within the limit, though the Dolben Act limit was in abeyance for 1796 as Parliament had failed to renew the Act that year. On her second voyage the Act was again in force so she may have been subject to a penalty on her return to Liverpool for exceeding the limit.) By the time Tarleton arrived back at Liverpool on 8 March 1798, she had lost five crew members; she had left Liverpool with 43 men.

== Loss ==
Tarleton left Liverpool on 30 July 1798.

In 1798, 160 British vessels left on enslaving voyages; 149 sailed from Liverpool.

In January 1799 Tarleton was reported to have been lost at Cape Palmas. She was lost before she had embarked any slaves. (Note: Radcliffe Shimmins went on to captain King George in April 1799 on a slave voyage.)

In 1799, 18 British slave ships were lost. Seven, including Tarleton, were lost outbound before they could embark slaves.
