= John Mason (master) =

John Mason (died 9 October 1788) was master of the Prince of Wales, a transport ship in the First Fleet.

Prince of Wales left Portsmouth on 13 May 1787, carrying 47 female convicts. Six days later two male convicts were also transferred aboard; the ringleaders of a failed mutiny aboard fellow First Fleet transport Scarborough. The Fleet arrived at Port Jackson, Sydney, Australia, on 26 January 1788.

Mason's ship left Port Jackson on 14 August 1788, and arrived back in London, via Rio de Janeiro, on 30 April 1789.

John Mason died of scurvy on 9 October 1788 during the return voyage.
