= Borrowdale (ship) =

Several ships have been named Borrowdale for Borrowdale:

- Borrowdale (1785 ship) a three-masted, square rigged merchant ship that served as a storeship of the First Fleet, a convoy of 11 ships taking settlers and convicts to establish the first European colony in Australia. She was wrecked in 1789.
- Borrowdale, of 991 NRT, was an iron cargo screw-steamer that Short Brothers, of Sunderland, launched in 1873. She was renamed Embiricos in 1883 and Nora in 1888. Stranded on 13 April 1895 at the mouth of the Yangtze River while carrying a cargo of coal from Shanghai to Nagasaki.
- Borrowdale, of 682 NRT, was an iron cargo screw-steamer that James Laing, Deptford, launched on 21 January 1890. On 21 January 1915 she sailed from Cardiff with a cargo of coal for Granville; she disappeared and was posted missing. The Board of Trade speculated that she had foundered in a gale on 22 January.
- Borrowdale, of 1,268 GRT, was a barque built in 1868 by W. H. Potter & Sons, Liverpool. She was sailing under a Russian-flag when SM U-21 stopped her on 30 April 1917 and sank her in the Atlantic Ocean south of Ireland (49°00′N 10°20′W). Her crew survived.
