= Dennis Considen =

Irish-born surgeon

Dennis Considen (died 1815) was an Irish-born surgeon, best known for his pioneering role in the use of Australian native plants for pharmaceutical use, especially eucalyptus oil, which he used to treat the convicts. He sailed with the First Fleet as surgeon on the Scarborough, which transported English convicts to Port Jackson, Australia, in 1788.

== Pioneering Australian pharmaceutical research ==
Considen used indigenous Australian plants to treat a range of diseases afflicting the convict settlement, including scurvy and dysentery. Pharmaceutical preparations included kino from Eucalyptus and Angophora, 'yellow gum' resin from Xanthorrhoea spp., native sarsaparilla Smilax glyciphylla, and the 'large peppermint-tree' Eucalyptus piperita.

In November 1788 Considen proclaimed himself to English colleague, Dr Anthony Hamilton, as the colony's pharmaceutic pioneer: "...if there is any merit in applying these & many other simples[sic] to the benefit of the poor wretches here, I certainly claim it, being the first who discovered & recommended them.". For further evaluation, Considen also dispatched a Eucalyptus oil sample, on the return voyage to England on Golden Grove.

The Australian botanist, Joseph Maiden, expressed the opinion that Considen deserves credit for being the first person to recognize the medicinal value of eucalyptus oil extracted from E. piperita found growing on the shores of Port Jackson. John White, Surgeon General to the Colony, is also credited with the discovery of peppermint gum oil, in documenting the matter and organizing oil samples to be sent back to England.

== Return to Ireland ==
In November 1791, after a period on Norfolk Island working with fellow Irish surgeons D'Arcy Wentworth and Thomas Jamison, Considen returned to Sydney. Considen was granted leave because of ill health, and sailed on the Kitty for Ireland. He arrived at Cork in February 1794. Back in Ireland, he served as a hospital mate in the Army Medical Service until he was appointed deputy-purveyor for service on the European Continent. In August 1799, he was promoted to the position of purveyor. This enabled him to study medicine at the University of Edinburgh and to better support his family.

Considen graduated as a Doctor of Medicine on the 24 June 1804, with a thesis entitled De Tetano, in which he refers to his discovery of eucalyptus oil. He was subsequently called to Cork to join an expedition bound for the Cape.

Considen maintained an interest in New South Wales and its natural history. He kept contact with his friends Thomas Arndell, George Johnston and D'Arcy Wentworth. Surviving records of Considen's character indicate that he was a humane man with an earnest desire to do well in his profession. On 6 January 1812 he was admitted a licentiate of the Royal College of Physicians. He died in 1815.

Joseph Maiden dedicated Eucalyptus consideniana in recognition of his pioneer work with eucalyptus oil.

== See also ==
- Eucalyptus oil
- Eucalyptus piperita

== Citations and references ==
=== References ===
- Historical Records of New South Wales, vol 1 part 2, vol 2.
- Historical Records of Australia, Series I, vol 1.
- Maiden, J.H., "Records of Australian Botanists: Considen, Denis" (sic), Journal and Proceedings of the Royal Society of New South Wales, vol 42, 1908, pp. 98–99.
- MacPherson, J., "Dennis Considen, Assistant Surgeon of the First Fleet", Medical Journal of Australia, 3 Dec 1927, pp. 770–73.
- Manuscript catalogue under Dennis Considen (State Library of New South Wales).
