= Maria Stuart Collins =

Canadian novelist and editor

Maria Stuart Collins (nee Proctor) (c. 1760 – c. 1830) was a Canadian novelist and the editor of the abridged version of An Account of the English Colony in New South Wales, one of the most important contemporary historical documents recording the First Fleet and development of Sydney from its early days as a convict colony. Her correspondence with her husband's family survives and provided insights on the life for an officer's wife who was separated from her husband for a long time, while he was overseas on colonial business. Maria was born in Halifax, Nova Scotia, c. 1760. She married David Collins, an English marine officer, in 1777 in Halifax. She gave birth to a daughter in 1778 who died in infancy. Although born to one of the most prominent Nova Scotia families, Maria was in great financial distress after her husband's death in 1810, and petitioned the UK government for a number of years before being awarded a pension. She died in Stonehouse, near Plymouth, Devon, Great Britain, in about 1830.

== Early life ==
Maria Stuart Proctor (sometimes spelt Procter) was born in Halifax, Nova Scotia, the daughter of Charles Proctor and his wife Margaret. Her father was a merchant, ship owner and prominent political figure in Nova Scotia. He had served as Justice of the Peace, Commissioner of the Highways, member of the House of Assembly of Nova Scotia, warden of St Paul's Church, trustee of the Commons at Halifax, lieutenant colonel in the Halifax Militia and provost marshal. As such, Maria had been brought up to "the prospect of a very large fortune." Maria was the youngest of seven children, a "lively girl, well educated and delicately brought up." She grew up in the North Suburbs of Halifax.

She met David Collins, an officer in the Royal Marines, when he was stationed in Halifax after the Battle of Bunker Hill. They married on 3 June 1777 by the Reverend John Breynton at the church of St. Paul, Halifax. Collins was the grandson of Arthur Collins, an English antiquarian who was best known for his work, Peerage of England.

== Marriage to David Collins ==
Following their marriage, the couple moved to Chatham in the UK in 1777, where they lived for the first few years of their marriage in the Naval barracks at Chatham. On 8 April 1778, the couple baptised their daughter Henrietta Susanna at Rochester, Kent. Their daughter did not survive infancy and was buried on 17 September 1780 in Chatham, Maria began to suffer from ill-health and did not have any more children.

Promotions for David followed. He became captain-lieutenant in August 1779 and captain in July 1780. In 1781 he joined HMS Courageux in the Channel Squadron. But, with the end of the Revolutionary War, in 1783 David was placed on half-pay and the couple moved to Rochester. In order to maintain a lifestyle worthy of his rank and status, David borrowed money.

With the prospect of a long peace, his father, Major-General Arthur Tooker Collins (1718–1793) encouraged David to accept an appointment as Deputy Judge Advocate of the new colony to be established in Botany Bay. Maria faced a long separation from her husband. She was not permitted to travel with him, as he was an officer, but it is unlikely she would have made the journey because there would have been no society of "civilised' women in the early days of the colony and because of her ill health. She had a general debility, was asthmatic and would develop epilepsy in later years.

While David was away, she spent time in London and was a guest of relations and members of the gentry and military. David's younger brother George had married Mary Trelawny, an heiress, and lived at Ham House in Devon. Maria often visited them.

She wrote letters to David which survive in the Mitchell Library. In these she updates him on family and political news but also voices her concerns that the expedition to Botany Bay has been forgotten and that "never was anything of the kind undertaken that seemed so little to interest the publick." She supplied David with necessaries, sending out clothes, newspapers and Edmund Burke's pamphlet on HMS Gorgon, but urged him "to come home my dearest love and resume your place in the world and no longer be buried in oblivion." In October 1793, Maria wrote to tell him that his father had died and the financial effects this had had on his family and his mother who was now forced to take lodgings in Plymouth.

They were apart for ten years. In New South Wales, David had lived with Ann Yeats, a convict, and had fathered two children, Marianne and George. Maria knew about this relationship and the children and stated in a letter to David, that she had received a visitor who "is ignorant of your unholy connection, as I know enough of him and his lady to think he would introduce you to her, or she receive you, as they are people of strict principle."

David returned to England in 1797 and found Maria "ill and weakened beyond anything [he] could have imagined." The couple moved to London, living at 19 Charing Cross and 6 Poland Street, which were respectable but not prime addresses. On his return to England, David struggled to advance or obtain any appointments. His financial affairs were not in good order and this led to disappointment and an anxious time for Maria. She described his situation as "her poor luckless David's affairs." She noted that their temperaments were different. "He enjoys the little good which is left without anticipating future evil while I, whose temper was wont to be so cheerful, am equally out of humour with the past, present and future. In short he gathers roses from thorns and I, afraid of meeting a thorn therefore avoid the rose."

In 1803, David returned to Australia, accepting a position of Lieutenant-Governor and to set up a new settlement at Sullivans Cove as a harbour for Hobart Town. Maria did not travel with him, remaining in London with her now frail and old mother.

Her sister, who had married the Irishman General Thomas de la Cour Desbrisay, died in 1798 in Charlottetown, Canada and Maria, worried about her health in 1804, asked her husband to support her mother. He agreed and instructed his bankers to support her mother in the amount of £150 per annum if anything happened to Maria.

In 1807 Maria wrote to David and told him she was intended to join him in Hobart, but she did not do so.

David died suddenly in 1810 while Lieutenant-Governor of Tasmania. His death left Maria in a tenuous financial situation.

== Literary career ==
=== Novels ===
Maria wrote novels to provide an income while David was away. These were written either under a pseudonym or anonymously at a time when women did not openly write novels. According to a Trelawny descendant, "Many of Maria's novels were still in the family library at Ham [House, Plymouth] in 1900, but their titles have not been recorded and the books apparently destroyed during World War II."

=== An Account of the English Colony in New South Wales ===
This account was published in London in two volumes, Volume 1 in 1798 and Volume 2 in 1802. These volumes were written by David Collins with Maria's help. It covers the colony from its first settlement in 1788 to August 1801. She was sceptical that the Account would be a commercial success, writing to him in 1797/98 that "Those who published before the [expedition to Botany Bay] was new did not succeed, it is very unlikely you should now it is forgot but you are surely right to do the best you can." Later she would write that her husband "was compelled to employ his hours in literary labour to procure a subsistence." The book however, sold well and is of prime historical significance.

In 1803, Maria took on the task of preparing the second edition. The form was to be such which "without lessening the interest of the word, might render it less expensive to the reader". She therefore abridged the 2 volumes and condensing them into one, reducing some 950 printed quarto pages to 562. "She slashed her way through the thickets of her husband's prose to breathe life into it ... So skilful and effective were her cuts, that many considered her text a distinct improvement on the original." Maria completed the task in 1804.

She wrote the preface to the second edition, stating that her husband had started work on the Abridgement when "an appointment from his Sovereign called him to fulfil its duties in a distant country. Thus situated, he prevailed on me to undertake a task for which I felt myself but ill calculated, I have performed with reluctance, and which nothing but the desire of complying with his wish could have induced me to perform at all." The exercise forced her to examine each page which meant that her "mind was by turns a prey to terror and disgust" and filled her with astonishment and compelled her to "condemn the temerity which could for a second time forgo every earthly enjoyment, a second time to encounter each species of hardship and all the cautious dangers so certainly attendant upon those who explore new and different climes a sacrifice for which no reward however liberal, no praise however loud, could offer any adequate recompense."

== Financial woes ==
Her husband had consistently borrowed throughout their marriage. On his death his assets in Hobart were not sufficient to meet his liabilities. Maria unsuccessfully petitioned the Admiralty for a pension. In 1811 she petitioned Robert Peel, then Undersecretary at the Transport Office for a pension pointing out that she had "been born and bred a gentlewoman and with better prospects than my hard fate has realised," her ill-health and that she had only thirty six pounds a year to live on, her 'husband's creditors having taken everything including a small property of my own amounting to one hundred a year." She was now dependent on the support and accommodation of friends. She petitioned Lord Bathurst, Secretary of State for the Colonies, in September 1812 that she "must now find a residence for myself; but where to turn; to what corner of the world, situated as I am, to direct my bewildered course?" Her brother-in-law, George Collins petitioned Lord Liverpool on her behalf. It transpired that before he left for Tasmania, Lord Hobart, who would become the Earl of Buckingham promised David, that if Maria's situation "should appear to be such as to require the aid of government, I should consider it my duty to support any application from her". As Earl of Buckingham he wrote to Earl Bathurst in support of her application and she was awarded a pension of £120 per year. In 1815 she petitioned again for an increase, but this was refused.

== Death and will ==
On 12 February 1828, Maria wrote her will. She was then residing at 23 Durnford Street, Stonehouse Devon. She left specific gifts of jewellery, including a gold watch set with pearls, gold enamelled watch keys, a rose diamond ring, a small garnet hoop rings, her books and a Jusia Japan box to her nieces and nephew and the widow of General Desborough. The residue of the estate was left to her nephew, Theophillis Desbrisay of the Royal Artillery. She died sometime in 1828–1830 before probate of the will was granted in September 1830.
