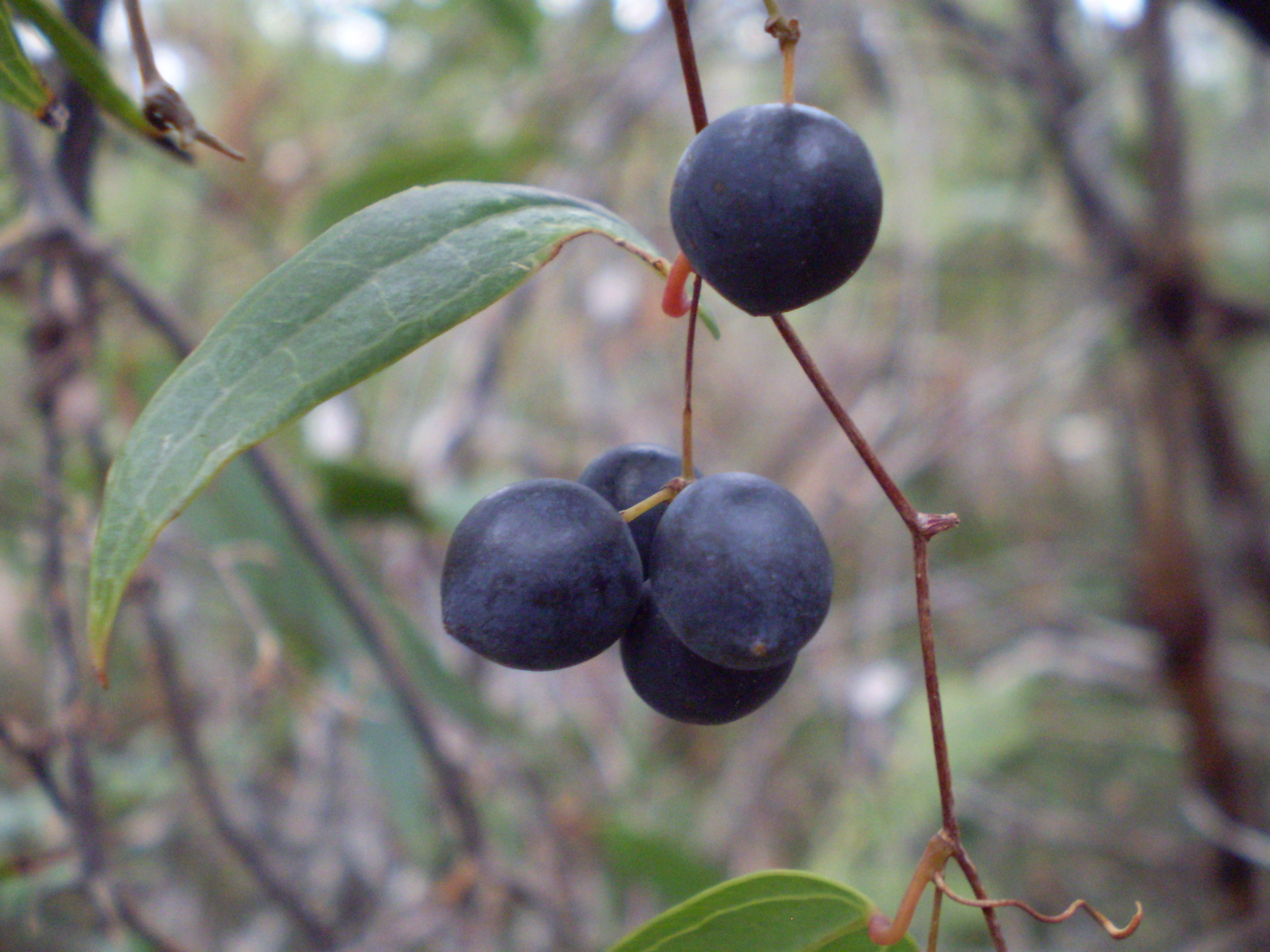

Scientific classification
- Kingdom: Plantae
- Clade: Embryophytes
- Clade: Tracheophytes
- Clade: Spermatophytes
- Clade: Angiosperms
- Clade: Monocots
- Order: Liliales
- Family: Smilacaceae
- Genus: Smilax
- Species: S. glyciphylla

Binomial name
- Smilax glyciphylla Sm.

= Smilax glyciphylla =

Sweet sarsaparilla

Species of flowering plant

Smilax glyciphylla, the sweet sarsaparilla, is a dioecious climber native to eastern Australia. It is widespread in rainforest, sclerophyll forest and woodland; mainly in coastal regions.

The leaves are distinctly three-veined with a glaucous under-surface, lanceolate, 4–10 cm long by 1.5–4 cm wide. Coiling tendrils are up to 8 cm long. The globose berries are 5–8 mm in diameter, black with a singular seed.

== Uses ==
The fruit is edible. The sweet flavoured leaves are used medicinally by Indigenous people and non-Indigenous colonists, including as a tea substitute.

It was used medicinally in the earliest days of the colony of Port Jackson for treating scurvy, coughs and chest complaints. In correspondence to England in November 1788, Dennis Considen wrote: "I have sent you some of the sweet tea of this country which I recommended and is generally used by the marines and convicts as such it is a fair antiscorbutic as well as a substitute for tea which is more costly."

It was recommended as a tea alternative, tonic and antiscorbutic, and was still being traded at least up until the late 19th century by Sydney herbalists. It is claimed to have similar properties to Jamaican sarsaparilla, Smilax regelii.

The leaves, stems, and flowers contain the glycoside glyciphyllin, which has a bitter-sweet taste and may be the active medicinal component.

Recent research shows that S. glyciphylla has antioxidant activity.

== Gallery ==
Images of Smilax glyciphylla
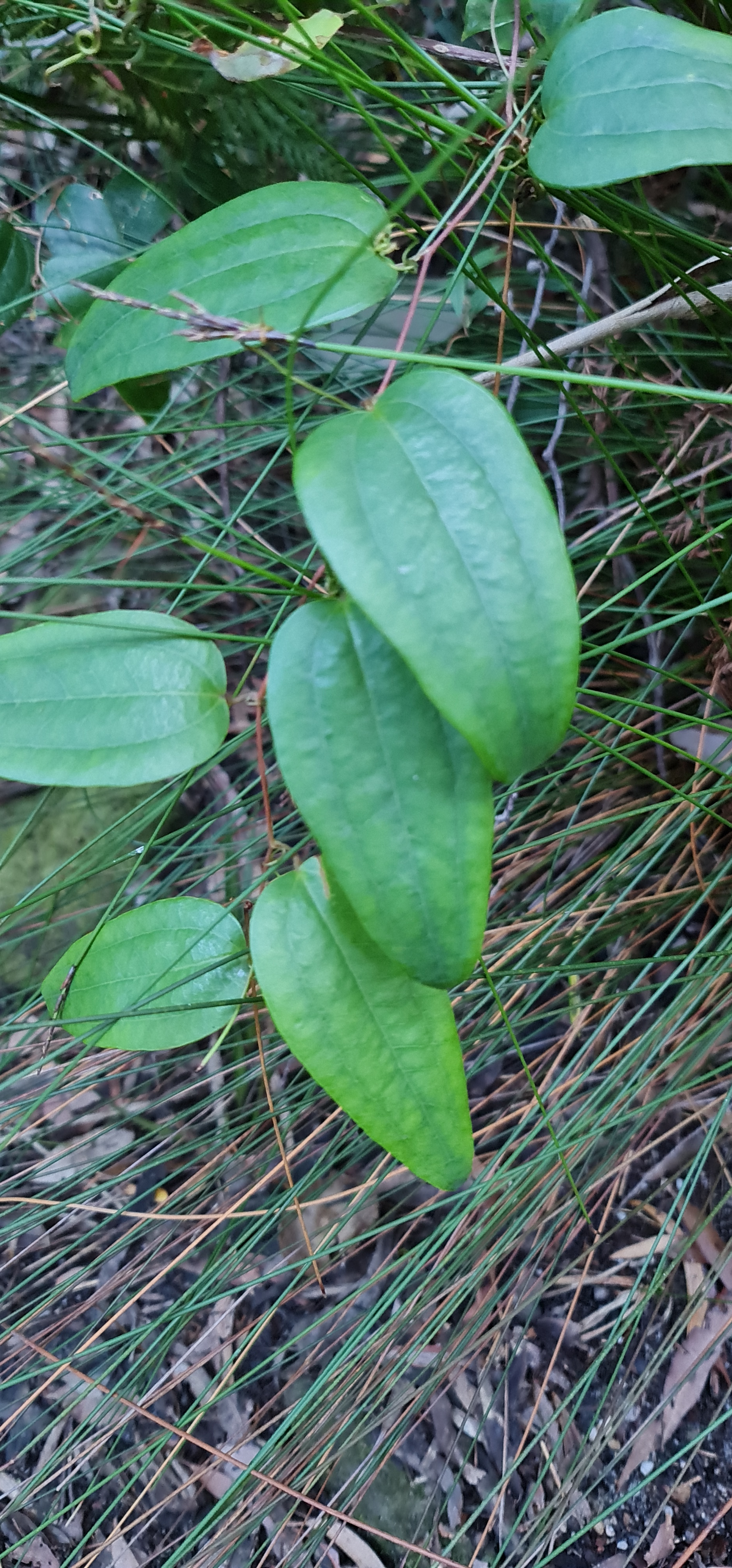
Leaves of Smilax glyciphylla showing three prominent veins. Drawing Room Rocks Track, near Berry, NSW.
