= Charles Procter =

Canadian politician

Charles Procter (died December 21, 1773) was a ship owner and political figure in Nova Scotia. He represented King's County from 1759 to 1760 and Halifax Township from 1765 to 1773 in the Nova Scotia House of Assembly.

He was one of the founding members of the Union Fire-Club on January 14, 1754, which had the distinction of being the first organized fire company in Canada. He was still listed as such in January 1759.

He served as major and then lieutenant-colonel in the Halifax militia. Procter was named Provost Marshal for Nova Scotia in 1771. He died in Halifax in 1773.

His daughter, Maria Stuart, married David Collins in 1777 and edited the second edition of An Account of an English Colony in New South Wales.
