= HMS Matilda (1805) =

History

France
- Name: Matilde
- Fate: Captured by the British 3 July 1805

United Kingdom
- Name: HMS Matilda
- Acquired: by capture, 3 July 1805
- Fate: Last listed 1805

General characteristics
- Type: Schooner
- Tons burthen: 200 (bm)
- Complement: 95
- Armament: 10 or 20 × 8-pounder guns (Note: The French pound being heavier than a British pound, an 8-pounder French gun would be the rough equivalent of a 9-pounder British gun.)

HMS Matilda was the French privateer Matilde, which HMS Cambrian captured in 1805. The British Royal Navy used her briefly that year. She is last listed in 1805.

== Capture ==
Cambrian captured the French privateer schooner Mathilde on 3 July 1805, after a chase of 22 hours. Mathilde, of 200 tons, was armed with twenty 9-pounder guns and had a crew of 95 men. (Note: James reports that Mathilde was armed with ten 8-pounder guns. However, James also gives Lieutenant Pigot's first name as Robert, whereas other accounts give it as George.) She surrendered in shoal water and if not for the efforts of Lieutenant Pigot in one of Cambrian's boats, Mathilde's entire crew might have been lost. (Note: Mathilde was a privateer schooner commissioned in Guadeloupe in June 1805. Demerliac states that the entire crew might have been killed during the capture, perhaps misreading the danger in which the crew was until Lieutenant Pigot intervened.)

Mathilde had earlier captured the letter of marque Clyde, which had been on her way to Liverpool. (Note: Clyde, of twelve 4-pounder guns and a crew of 30 men under the command of David Kilock, had received her letter of marque on 20 November 1804.) Prior to her capture by Cambrian, Mathilde had evaded capture by Heron.

== Action of 7 July ==
Captain Beresford of Cambrian appointed Lieutenant Pigot commander of Matilda, and used her as a tender.

On 7 July Lieutenant Pigot again distinguished himself. He arrived off the harbour of St. Marys, Georgia the day before and took Matilda twelve miles up the St Marys River to attack three vessels reported to be there. All long the way militia and riflemen fired on Matilda. Eventually the British reached the vessels, which were lashed in a line cross the river. They consisted of a Spanish privateer schooner and her two prizes, the ship Golden Grove and the British brig Ceres, which the Spanish privateer had captured some two months earlier. The Spaniards had armed Golden Grove with eight 6-pounder guns and six swivels, and given her a crew of 50 men. The brig too they had armed with swivels and small arms. The Spanish schooner carried six guns and a crew of 70 men.

Pigot engaged the vessels for an hour, and after Matilda had grounded, took his crew in her boats and captured Golden Grove. The British then captured the other two vessels. Lastly, Pigot fired on a group of 100 militia and a field gun, dispersing them. The British had two men killed, and 14 wounded, including Pigot, who had received two bullet wounds to his head and one to a leg. Spanish casualties were reportedly 25 men killed (including five Americans) and 22 men wounded. A crowd of Americans on the Georgia side of the river watched the entire battle. Pigot was unable to extricate himself and his prizes from the river until 21 July, but during the entire period he remained in command except when he was getting his wounds dressed. For his efforts Pigot received a promotion to commander, and the Lloyd's Patriotic Fund awarded him a medal and a plate worth £50. (Note: Long gives the name of Pigot's vessel as the Spanish privateer Maria. Beresford's letter states that Pigot's vessel was the vessel they had taken on 3 July, making her Matilda.)

== Fate ==
Matilda is no longer listed after 1805.
