= Golden Grove (1782 ship) =

Storeship of First Fleet

History

Great Britain
- Name: 1780–1782: Russian Merchant; 1782–1811: Golden Grove
- Namesake: Golden Grove, Carmarthenshire
- Owner: Leighton & Co., London
- Port of registry: Whitby
- Launched: 1780
- Renamed: Golden Grove (1782)
- Fate: Unknown, disappeared from records after 1811

General characteristics
- Type: Store ship
- Tons burthen: 321, or 331, or 333, or 400 (bm)
- Length: 94 ft (29 m)
- Beam: 30 ft (9.1 m)
- Sail plan: Full-rigged ship
- Armament: 1781:7 × 6-pounder guns + 3 × 12-pounder carronades; 1783:2 × 9-pounder + 4 × 6-pounder guns; 1796–97:2 × 9-pounder guns + 4 × 12-pounder carronades

Golden Grove was built at Whitby in 1780 as Russian Merchant, and was renamed Golden Grove in 1782. She served as a storeship for the First Fleet to Australia. Thereafter she sailed to the Mediterranean and the Baltic. In 1805 a privateer captured her, but the Royal Navy recaptured her. She is last listed in 1811–1813.

== Early career ==
Russian Merchant first appeared in Lloyd's Register in 1781 with T. Parker, master, Leighton, owner, and trade Saint Petersburg—London.

Year	Name	Master	Owner	Trade
1782	Russian Merchant; Golden Grove	T.Parker	Leighton	Saint Petersburg—London
1783	Golden Grove	J. Mann	Leighton	London-Jamaica
1784	Golden Grove	J. Mann	Leighton	Jamaica-London
1786	Golden Grove	Thompson	Leighton	London
1787	Golden Grove	W. Sharp	Leighton	London—Botany Bay

== First Fleet ==
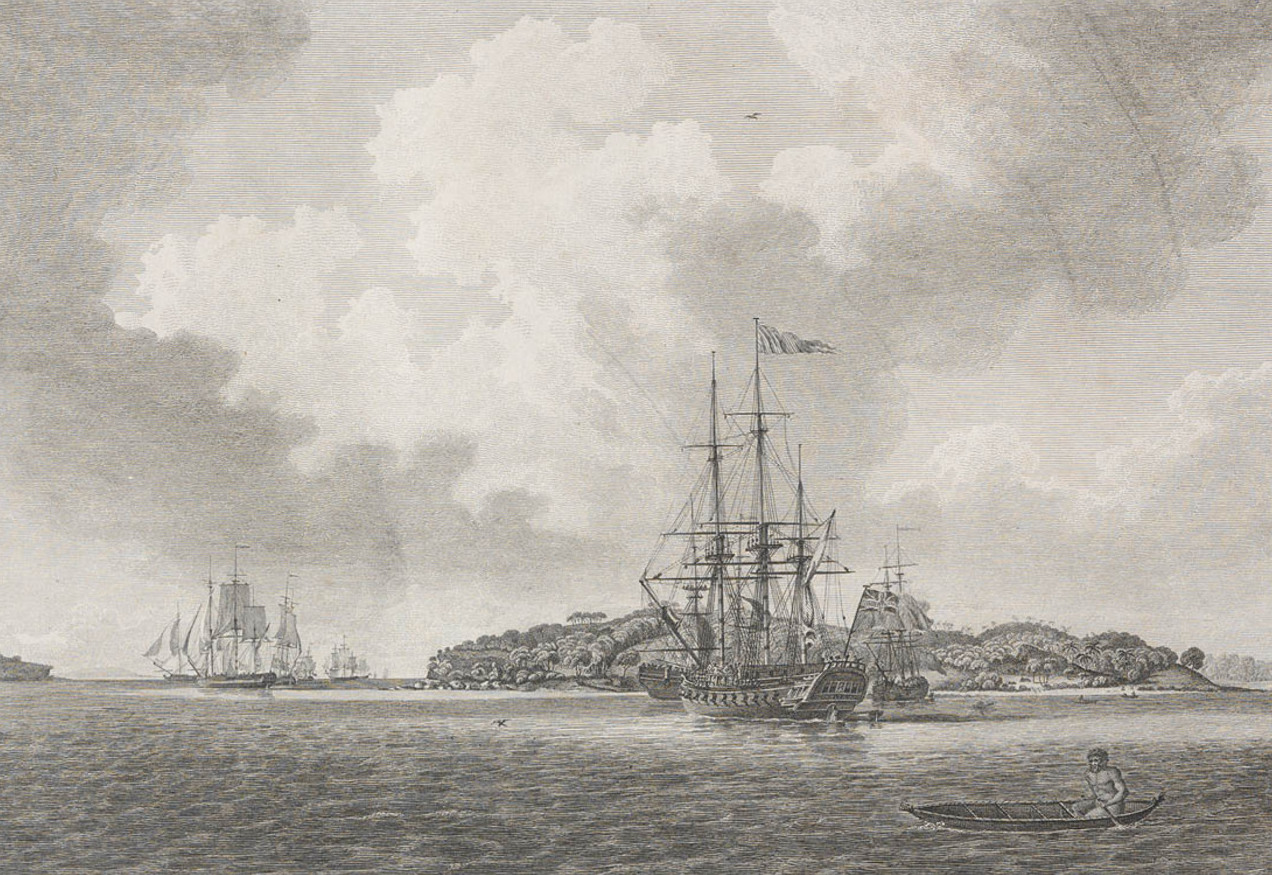
An engraving of the First Fleet in Botany Bay at voyage's end in 1788, from The Voyage of Governor Phillip to Botany Bay.

Golden Grove's master was William Sharp. The Fleet's chaplain Richard Johnson and his wife and servant travelled to New South Wales on this ship.

She left Portsmouth on 13 May 1787, and arrived at Botany Bay, Sydney, Australia, on 26 January 1788 but left for Port Jackson soon after. On 2 October 1788 she took 21 male and 11 female convicts to Norfolk Island, returning to Port Jackson on 25 October. She left Port Jackson on 19 November 1788, keeping company with Fishburn until losing sight of her on 11 April 1789 after several days at the Falkland Islands for the recovery of crew members who were sick with scurvy. She arrived back in England on 9 June 1789.

== Later career and fate ==
Lloyd's Register for 1791 shows Golden Grove, with Sharp, master, and trade London—Botany Bay, changing to London—Stettin.

Year	Master	Owner	Trade
1792	W. Sharp	Leighton	London—Marseilles
1793	W. Sharp	Leighton	London—Marseilles
1794	W. Sharp	Leighton	London—Marseilles
1795	A. Maria	J. Tavener	Portsmouth—Riga
1796	A. Merinn	J. Tavener	Portsmouth—Riga
1797	A. Merinn	J. Tavener	Portsmouth—Riga
1798	A. Merinn	J. Tavener	Portsmouth—Riga
1799	A. Merinn	J. Tavener	Liverpool—Riga
1800	A. Merinn; John Oswald	J. Tavener; John Fletcher	Liverpool—Riga
1801	John Oswald	John Fletcher	Liverpool—Perneau
1802	John Oswald; F. Blair	John Fletcher; J. Sutton	Liverpool—Perneau
1803	F. Blair	J. Sutton	Liverpool—Perneau
1804	F. Blair	J. Sutton	Liverpool—Perneau

Lloyd's Register for 1805 listed Golden Grove, of 333 tons (bm), built in 1780 at Whitby, F. Blair, master, J. Sutton, owner, with trade London—Elsinor. This entry continues unchanged until 1811. The Register of Shipping carries an identical entry until 1811.

== Capture and recapture ==
On 9 May 1805, a Spanish privateer schooner captured Golden Grove, Blair, master, as she was sailing from Virginia to Liverpool. The privateer also captured the brig Ceres, Meffervey, master, which had been sailing from Virginia to Guernsey. The Spaniards took both into Florida where they were condemned as prizes.

On 7 July the boats of HMS Cambrian ascended the St Mary's River. There they recaptured Golden Grove and the British brig Ceres, and captured the Spanish privateer schooner that had captured the two British vessels. A British sailor and marine were killed, and 14 were wounded. The Spaniards suffered 25 men killed (including five Americans), and 22 wounded. Most of the casualties occurred on Golden Grove, on which the Spaniards had put 50 men; she was armed with eight 6-pounder guns and six swivel guns.

Cambrian arrived at Bermuda on 4 August, in company with Golden Grove, Ceres, and the privateer Matilda. The Royal Navy took Mathilda into service as HMS Matilda.

U.S. sources reported that the Spanish privateer had fitted out at St Augustine. Her captain was an American, as were a number of her officers and men; her owner was also an American. She had captured a Bermudian sloop and Golden Grove in the Chesapeake, and Ceres just outside. The privateer had then taken her prizes to St Augustine, where they were condemned. The privateer's commander, Captain Hooper, died when the British cut her out.

Captain Francis Blair wrote a letter of protest to the U.S. Government. The letter named the Spanish schooner privateer as Atrevido, and argued that the capture was illegal as Altrevido had not waited 24 hours after Golden Grove's departure before herself setting out in pursuit. Furthermore, Hooper had concealed his armament and crew with the result that none of the British ships captured had known that he was a privateer. The U.S. government made further inquiries as to whether the privateer in question was "abusing American waters." Cambrian's capture of the privateer and her prey may have rendered the matter moot.

== Postscript ==
A former inner-city suburb of Sydney was named after the ship. This suburb has now been largely subsumed into a small locality, part of Newtown and Camperdown and the name today is carried only by some maps and a street in the area.

An Urban Transit Authority First Fleet ferry was named after Golden Grove in 1986.

== See also ==
- First Fleet
- Journals of the First Fleet
