= Borrowdale (1785 ship) =

British storeship of the Australian First Fleet

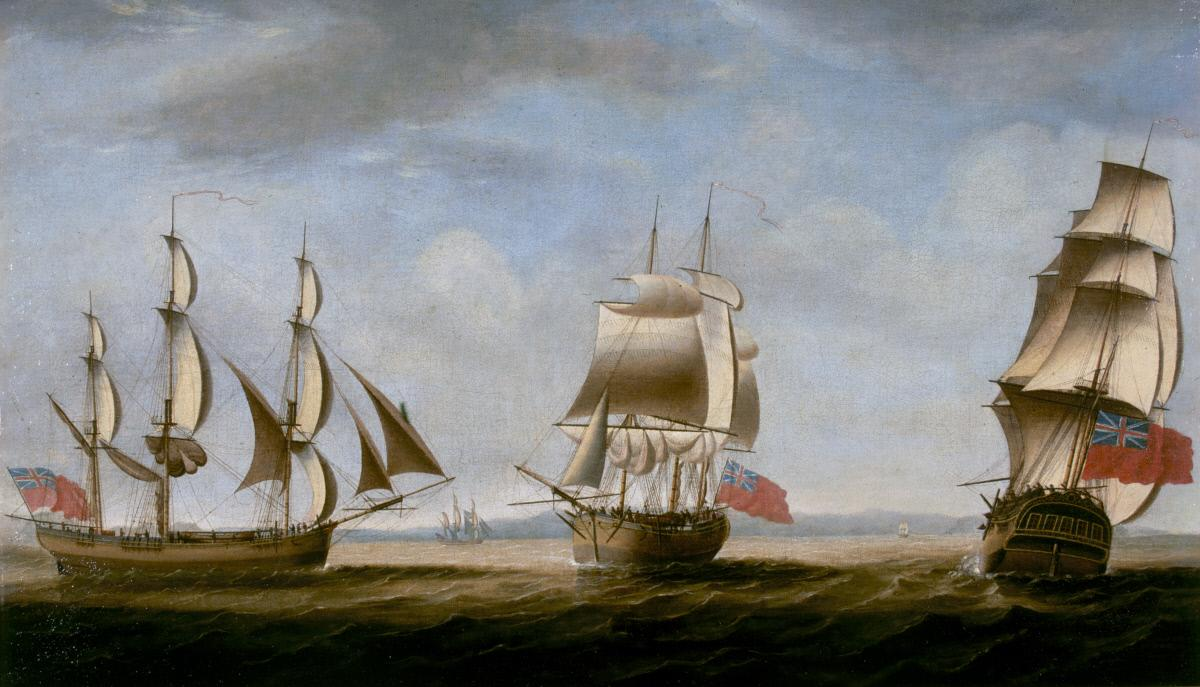
- Borrowdale from three angles

History

Great Britain
- Name: Borrowdale
- Namesake: Borrowdale
- Launched: 1785, Sunderland
- Fate: Sunk, 31 October 1789

General characteristics
- Type: Storeship
- Tons burthen: 272, or 340 (bm)
- Length: 75 ft (23 m)
- Beam: 22 ft (6.7 m)
- Sail plan: Full-rigged ship
- Complement: 22
- Armament: 4 guns

Borrowdale was a three-masted, square rigged merchant ship, launched in 1785, that served as a storeship of the First Fleet, a convoy of 11 ships taking settlers and convicts to establish the first European colony in Australia. She was wrecked in 1789.

== Career ==
Borrowdale was built in Sunderland in 1785. She was one of three colliers (the others were Golden Grove and Fishburn) owned by George and William Leighton, coal shippers of Sunderland, that the British government contracted to carry stores and provisions to Australia. Previously, the three vessels had carried coal from Newcastle to London.

Borrowdale was one of 11 vessels that made up the First Fleet of settlers to Botany Bay, departing Britain in 1787.

She first appeared in Lloyd's Register in 1786, with [Hobson] Reed, master, Leighton, owner, and trade London-Botany Bay.

She left Portsmouth on 13 May 1787, and arrived at Botany Bay, Sydney, Australia, on 20 January 1788. Along with most other ships of the First Fleet, Borrowdale sailed on to Port Jackson arriving 26 January 1788, after the colonists found Botany Bay unsuitable for settlement.

She left Port Jackson on 14 July 1788, to return to England via Cape Horn. The crew was so badly affected by scurvy that the master, (Readthorn) Hobson Reed, took her to Rio de Janeiro, where the harbour master and his men had to bring the ship to its berth. Five of the crew died on the homeward voyage. One of the five was the captain's father, Joseph Reed, a former master mariner in the coal trade. Borrowdale arrived at Plymouth from Botany Bay on 25 March 1789.

== Career per Lloyd's Register ==
After returning to England Borrowdale served as a collier.

Unfortunately, information is only as correct and up-to-date as the information vessel owners provided.

Year	Master	Owner	Trade	Notes
1787	H. Reed	Leighton	London - Botany Bay	340 tons (bm)
1788				Not available on line
1789	H. Reed	Leighton	London - Botany Bay	340 tons (bm)

== Fate ==
A violent storm developed off the coast of Norfolk on 30 October 1789, that damaged many vessels and sank some. On 31 October 1789, Borrowdale sank off Great Yarmouth, taking Reed and all but one man of his crew with her.

== Post-script ==
An Urban Transit Authority First Fleet ferry was named after Borrowdale in 1985. Borrowdale remains in operation and is run by Sydney Ferries to date (2022).

== See also ==
- First Fleet
- Journals of the First Fleet
