= Elizabeth Pulley =

- Baptised: 21 Feb 1762, Felthorpe, Norfolk UK
- Died: 9 Aug 1837; Castlereagh, New South Wales
- Occupation: Pioneer settler
- Spouse: Anthony Rope (m. 19 May 1788)
- Children: 8

Elizabeth Rope (née Pulley) (1762–1837) was a First Fleet convict sentenced in 1783 at Thetford Norfolk to 7 years transportation for theft. She was transported to New South Wales on the Friendship and the Prince of Wales, disembarking in Sydney Cove on 6 February 1788. In May that year she married Anthony Rope, a convict from the Alexander, and the family became pioneering settlers.

== An orphan in Norfolk UK ==
Elizabeth was born to Tobias and Alice Pulley of Felthorpe, Norfolk, and baptised on 21 Feb 1762 in St Margaret's church, the only girl of four children. Tobias was the son of George and Dorothy (née Bensly) Pulley from Horsford, where the Pulley families had lived for centuries as tenant farmers, weavers and rural workers.

In February 1764 her father Tobias and a brother died of a contagious illness and were buried in St Peter's churchyard, Haveringland, aged 27 and 4. In April 1768 her mother Alice, 32, also died. Elizabeth was now orphaned at the age of 6. Almost nothing is known of her fate until mid 1779 when she was charged, aged 17, in Norwich of petty theft, but was found not guilty. On 13 July 1780 Elizabeth, then a resident in Drayton, was sentenced in the Norfolk Quarter Sessions to be sent to the Wymondham bridewell and whipped in the market place. Her incarceration is commemorated in the Wymondham Bridewell Museum dungeon today as the prisoner ‘who had helped found Australia’. In mid 1781 Elizabeth was charged with stealing assorted clothing and sentenced to a year in the Aylsham bridewell – she was released August 1782. On Christmas Eve 1782, Elizabeth was charged with breaking into the Hethersett shop of Mrs Minns and stealing 2 cheeses, 4 Bacons, butter, raisons, flour and two rolls of cloth. On 17 March 1783 at the Thetford Quarter Sessions she was found ‘Guilty, to be Hanged by the neck until she be dead'. A Royal reprieve commuted the sentence to 7 years transportation, and she was sent to the Norwich Castle 'lower gaol', where the poorer prisoners were held.

== Voyage to New South Wales ==
After four years in Norwich Castle prison, Elizabeth was taken on a three-day coach journey to Plymouth harbour, in readiness to board a convict ship that would transport her to New South Wales. Elizabeth, aged 25, boarded the Dunkirk hulk on 5 November 1786, and the Friendship in Plymouth harbour on 11 March 1787. Two days later the Friendship joined the ships anchored at the Spithead in Portsmouth preparing to sail to New South Wales. On 13 May 1787 a flotilla of eleven ships under the command of Captain Arthur Phillip, known as the First Fleet, departed Portsmouth and headed for the first port of call, Santa Cruz on Tenerife Island. The eight-month voyage to Australia was eventful, especially for Elizabeth and the female convicts aboard the Friendship, where she was said to be part of 'the fighting five'. Elizabeth and other female convicts were transferred to the Prince of Wales in Cape Town to make space for sheep for the rest of the journey to Botany Bay. On 20 January 1788 all ships in the fleet arrived in Botany Bay within 2 days of each other – an extraordinary navigational feat – with little loss of life. Botany Bay proved unsuitable for the settlement, and Captain Phillip directed the ships to Sydney Cove in Port Jackson.

== The European settlement ==
The arrival of the First Fleet at Sydney Cove founded European settlement in Australia. On 26 January 1788 Arthur Phillip proclaimed the British colony and all convicts set about constructing tents and huts around the cove. On 6 February Elizabeth Pulley and all the other female convicts disembarked in Sydney Cove on a stormy afternoon, and for the first time she met the Norfolk convict Anthony Rope. On 19 May, Anthony and Elizabeth were the 54th couple to be married by the Reverend Richard Johnson. They celebrated a wedding supper with a few friends, where Elizabeth served a sea pye – a salt-meat pie topped with dough. This pie almost led to the couple's hanging because it contained illegal fresh meat. Phillip had declared that fresh meat, unless part of the rations, was prohibited for convicts at the threat of hanging. Elizabeth, Anthony and two male friends were charged with killing a goat belonging to a Marine officer. There was insufficient evidence to find them guilty and they were released. The Ropes' first child Robert was baptized on 2 November 1788. As Anthony and Elizabeth had only met on 6 February it is claimed by the family that Robert Rope was 'the first European child conceived and born in the colony'.

Elizabeth was assigned to collect shells to make lime for brick mortar. But food supplies were short and the colony needed to quickly grow its own grain. Governor Phillip found better land along the Parramatta River at a place he called Rose Hill, now Parramatta. In 1790, Elizabeth and Anthony were moved to Rose Hill where Anthony worked as a bricklayer and they lived in a small hut with an adjacent vegetable garden. Soon after, in 1791, they were granted 70 acres of land at The Ponds (now Dundas Valley) – it was the 55th land grant in the colony. For the colony not to starve in the early years, Phillip needed well-behaved convicts and ex-convicts to become farmers and to grow cereal crops. Survival of the colony depended on their efforts.

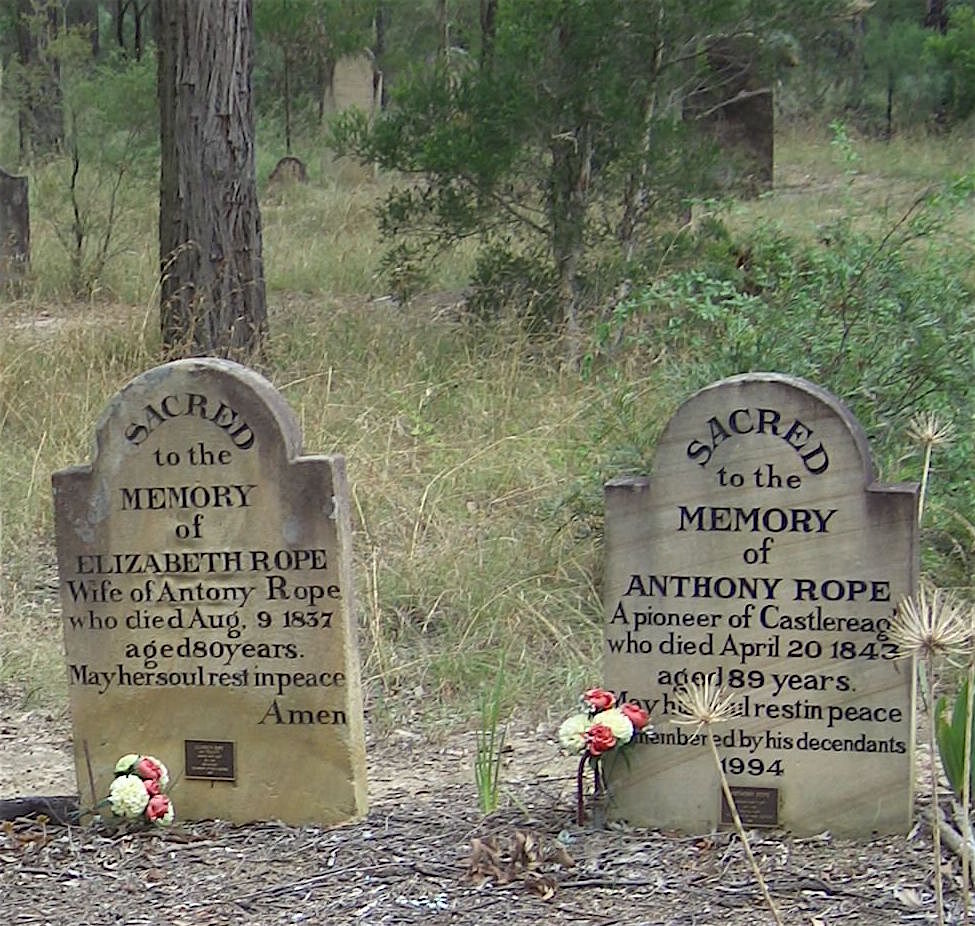
Gravestones of Anthony and Elizabeth Rope in the Castlereagh General Cemetery, Cranebrook. It is an Australian pioneer burial place in a bush setting.

== Pioneering settlers ==
Over the next 40 years, the Rope family settled and farmed in a number of different farm districts, moving each time to find richer soils and safer locations to grow cereal crops. This was in the districts close to the Parramatta, the Hawkesbury, the Nepean Rivers and the South and Eastern Creeks. The Hawkesbury River district, in particular, was considered the most fertile area in the colony but it was particularly susceptible to floods, and the Ropes were devastated several times by major flooding. Elizabeth and Anthony were dedicated crop farmers who experienced more than their share of personal hardships, flooded farms and lawsuits, but the family endured and successfully nurtured their children and many grandchildren.

Elizabeth was the emotional and financial stalwart of the family, and she worked hard as a farmer at Anthony's side; a strong determined woman. Most pioneer settlers had large families and their 8th and last child, Elizabeth Ann was born when Elizabeth was 46 years old. All but one of their children lived to adulthood, evidence of their parenting skills in those challenging times. One of their grandsons, Toby Ryan became an elected representative of the Nepean district the New South Wales Legislative Assembly (1860–72) and wrote a book about his colonial experiences Reminiscences of Australia.

Elizabeth Rope died aged 75 on 9 August 1837, and Anthony Rope died aged 86 on 20 April 1843 – the year that the transportation of convicts ended for New South Wales. Both are buried at the Castlereagh pioneer cemetery in Cranebrook, and their gravestones remain intact today. Their lives spanned the tenures of nine colonial governors; from Arthur Phillip to George Gipps. The Ropes are commemorated by the naming of the waterway Ropes Creek and the Sydney suburb of Ropes Crossing, and appear as a number of street names.

== Bibliography ==
- Cobley, John, The Crimes of the First Fleet Convicts, Angus & Robertson, Sydney, 1985. ISBN 0-207-14562-8
- Hall, Annegret, In for the Long Haul, ESH Publication, Nedlands, 2018. ISBN 978-0-9876292-0-3
- Gillen, Mollie, The Founders of Australia: A Biographical Dictionary of the First Fleet, Library of Australian History, Sydney, 1989.
- Ryan, James T., Reminiscences of Australia, George Robertson, Sydney, 1895.
