= Anthony Rope =

- Baptised: 1 August 1756, St Mary's Church, Norton Subcourse, Norfolk UK
- Died: 20 April 1843; Castlereagh, New South Wales
- Occupation: Pioneer settler
- Known for: Ropes Creek; Ropes Crossing in New South Wales
- Spouse: Elizabeth Pulley (m. 19 May 1788)
- Children: 8

Anthony Rope (1756–1843) was a First Fleet convict sentenced to seven-years transportation in 1785, and arrived at Sydney Cove, New South Wales in January 1788. He became a pioneering farmer in the Hawkesbury district and lived to be almost 87 years of age. The waterway Ropes Creek and Sydney suburb Ropes Crossing are named after him.

== Life in Norfolk, UK ==
Anthony Rope was baptised on 1 August 1756 at St Mary's Church, Norton Subcourse in Norfolk, the 10th child of 11. His parents were established tenant farmers, as witnessed by ornate gravestones in St Mary church cemetery that are still in good condition today, but they were not landholders. Anthony's mother died when he was only four-years old. As a child he would have had to work on the farm, or was sent elsewhere to bring money into the family.

Between childhood and young adulthood no records of Anthony Rope have survived. Documents about him first appear in 1784, when, aged 28, he was found guilty of stealing goods valued at 58s 6d in Rochford, Essex, over 100 miles from his home village of Norton Subcourse. Stealing above 40s was a hanging offence but judges had exercised pius perjury to undervalue the goods at only 35s. Consequently, he was sentenced to seven years Beyond the Seas. At that time there was still no place to send him to. Soon after he was transferred to the hulks Ceres and Justitia moored on the Thames River to do hard labour. This was brutally hard work and usually convicts were in chains, especially when on land. Unlike land prisons the food on the hulks was substantial in order that the men were able to work hard.

In late 1786 prisons were asked to select healthy and fit convicts suitable for founding a new prison colony in New South Wales. These convicts were sent to various ports to embark onto the transport ships of the First Fleet. The largest ship, Alexander and Scarborough, transported only male convicts. The small Friendship carried both male and females. Rope was placed on the Alexander. The transport ships had been modified and provisioned at the Woolwich docks. Convicts from the London prisons and hulks were loaded there and most transports sailed directly to Portsmouth where they anchored at the Spithead outside the harbour. The Friendship and Charlotte sailed to Plymouth to load prisoners. After six-months delay the flotilla of eleven ships (the First Fleet) finally set sail for NSW on 13 May 1787 with Captain Arthur Phillip in command. During the delay there was much speculation in newspapers about the viability of the Botany Bay Scheme.

== First Fleet Voyage to New South Wales ==
The journey of the First Fleet to NSW often through often uncharted seas took an amazing eight months. The first port of call was Santa Cruz on Teneriffe Island. After some provisioning they sailed 5000 nautical miles through the tropics to Rio de Janeiro. Here the fleet stayed for one month loading provisions and repairing the boats. To combat scurvy the convicts received 10 oranges a day and were allowed to exercise on deck while the crew had leave on shore. The fleet then sailed onto Cape Town, where some female convicts were transferred from the Friendship to the Prince of Wales to make space for sheep. After a month they set sail for New South Wales across the rough and bitterly cold Southern Ocean driven on by the Roaring Forties winds. Two weeks into this leg, Phillip divided the convoy into two divisions so that faster ships would reach Botany Bay earlier to prepare for the landing. However all ships arrived within two days of each other – it was an extraordinary navigational feat, with no loss of ships and little loss of life. Botany Bay proved unsuitable for the settlement and Captain Phillip moved the ships to Sydney Cove in Port Jackson.

== The European Settlement ==
The arrival of the First Fleet founded European settlement in Australia. Rope was disembarked from the Alexander on 26 January 1788 and all convicts set about constructing tents and huts around Sydney Cove. Rope met his future wife Elizabeth Pulley for the first time when the female convicts disembarked in Sydney Cove on the stormy afternoon on 6 February 1788. On 19 May, Rope and Pulley were the 54th couple to be married since the landing. They celebrated a wedding supper with a few friends, where Pulley served a sea pye – a salt-meat pie topped with dough. This pie almost led to the newlywed's hanging because it contained illegal fresh meat. Phillip had declared that fresh meat, unless part of the rations, was prohibited for convicts at the threat of hanging. The couple and two male friends were charged with killing a goat belonging to a Marine officer. There was insufficient evidence to find them guilty and they were released.

Initially Rope was assigned as a convict to make bricks, and Pulley to collect shells to make lime. But food supplies were short and the colony needed to quickly grow its own grain. Governor Phillip found better land along the Parramatta River at a place he called Rose Hill, now Parramatta. When the second fleet of hungry convicts arrived in 1790, the Ropes were moved to Rose Hill where Anthony worked as a bricklayer. Soon after, in 1791, he was granted 70 acres of land at The Ponds (now Dundas Valley) – it was the 55th land grant in the colony. For the colony not to starve in the early years, Phillip needed well-behaved convicts and ex-convicts to become farmers and to grow cereal crops. Survival of the colony depended on it.

== Cereal farmers in the colony ==
Shiploads of convicts continued to arrive in Port Jackson but usually without sufficient provisions – if anything, Government rations became smaller and smaller. Between 1788 and 1843 over 500 ships transported more than 80,000 convicts to Sydney Cove. The movement of the Rope family to different farm districts over these years indicates how settlers growing grain needed to find richer soils and safer locations. Some were sent to Norfolk Island, others cultivated land along the various waterway; the Parramatta, the Hawkesbury, the Nepean and their tributaries. The Hawkesbury River district, in particular, was seen as the most fertile area in the colony and the Ropes moved to several different properties to find the best farming land. Most pioneer settlers had large families. The Ropes' first child Robert was baptized on 2 Nov 1788. As Anthony and Elizabeth had only met on 6 February 1788 it is claimed that Robert Rope was 'the first European child conceived and born in the colony'.

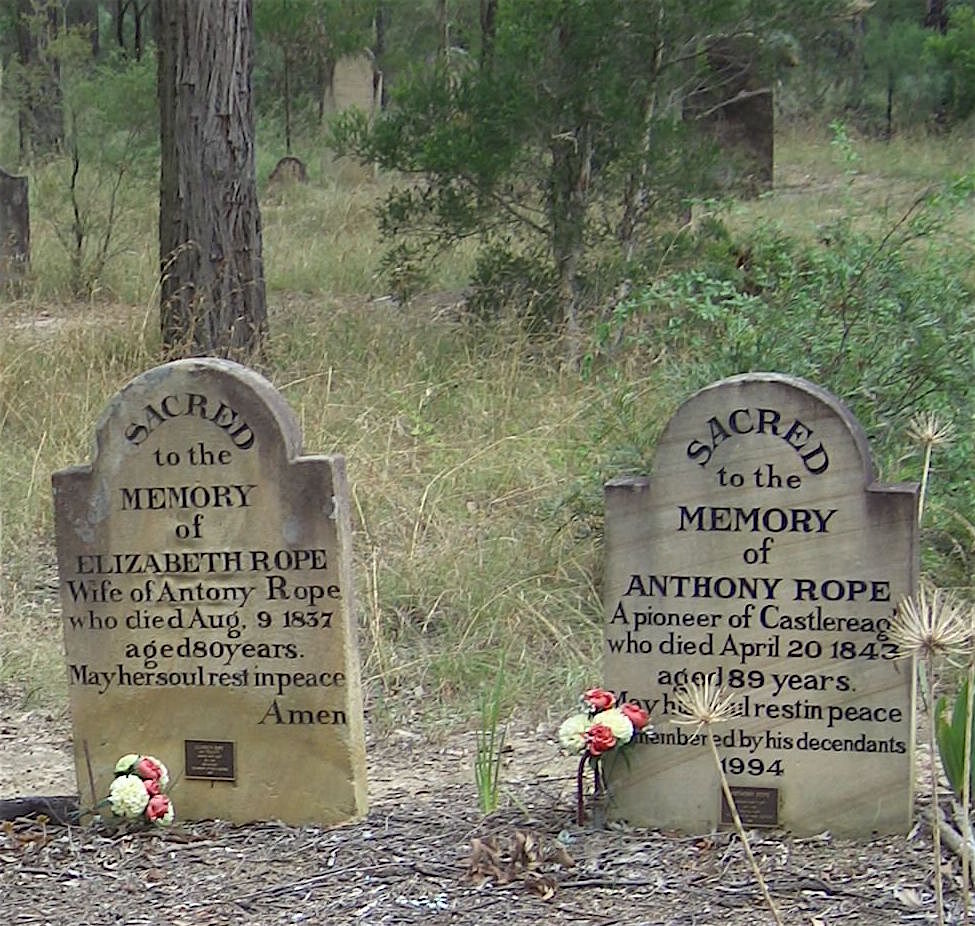
Gravestones of Anthony and Elizabeth Rope in the Castlereagh General Cemetery, Cranebrook. It is an Australian pioneer burial place in a bush setting.

The Ropes were dedicated cereal farmers who put up with more than their share of personal hardships, flooded farms and lawsuits. Their 8th and last child, Elizabeth Ann was born when mother Elizabeth was 46 years old – all but one child reached adulthood – a tribute to them as parents in those medically challenging times. Elizabeth worked hard at Anthony's side all her life, and she was a strong woman to live to an age of 75, when the average lifespan was in the 50s. Her daughters also had long lives, living into their 80s.

== Commemorating the Ropes ==
Elizabeth Rope died on 9 August 1837, and Anthony Rope died on 20 April 1843 – the year that the transportation of convicts ended for New South Wales. Both are buried at the pioneer cemetery in Cranebrook, and their gravestones remain intact today. Anthony's life spanned 55 years of the colony and the tenures of nine governors; from Arthur Phillip to George Gipps. The Ropes are commemorated by the naming of the waterway Ropes Creek and the Sydney suburb of Ropes Crossing, plus some street names. It is estimated that the descendants of Anthony and Elizabeth exceed 20,000.

== Bibliography ==
- Cobley, John, The Crimes of the First Fleet Convicts, Angus & Robertson, Sydney, 1985. ISBN 0 207 14562 8
- Hall, Annegret, In for the Long Haul, ESH Publication, Nedlands, 2018. ISBN 978 0 9876292 0 3
- Gillen, Mollie, The Founders of Australia: A Biographical Dictionary of the First Fleet, Library of Australian History, Sydney, 1989.
- Ryan, James T., Reminiscences of Australia, George Robertson, Sydney, 1895.
