= Elizabeth Thackery =

Convict and Australian colonist

- Born: 1767; Manchester, Lancashire, England
- Died: 7 August 1856 (aged 89); New Norfolk, Tasmania
- Burial place: Methodist Chapel churchyard, Magra, Tasmania
- Known for: first female convict to land in Australia
- Criminal charge: Theft
- Criminal penalty: 7 years' transportation (Australia)
- Spouses: Thomas Thackery (m. 1784; sep. 1787) Samuel King (m. 1810; died 1849)
- Partner: James Dodding (c. 1790 – 28 January 1810)

Elizabeth Thackery (1767 – 7 August 1856) was the last known survivor of the First Fleet, and was generally known throughout her long lifetime as the first female convict to land in Australia. Her husband, Samuel King, is thought to be the last male survivor of the First Fleet.

She was from Manchester, Lancashire, England. She was tried on 4 May 1786, and sentenced to seven years' transportation for the theft of two black silk handkerchiefs and three white handkerchiefs, with a total value of one shilling.

She left England on the convict transport Friendship in May 1787, aged 21 at the time. She and six other women were transferred from the ship Friendship to the ship Charlotte at 1 pm on Sunday 28 October 1787 to make way for livestock that were loaded there at Cape Town in South Africa. She was placed in irons a number of times during the voyage.

On 28 January 1788, two days after arrival in Australia, 17 marines' wives were landed from the ship Prince of Wales to the northern side of the harbour. On Tuesday, 5 February 1788, five female convicts were landed from the ship Prince of Wales near the Governors' eastern side of the harbour. They had been selected for subsequent transport to Norfolk Island ten days later on 15 February 1788.

The next day, on Wednesday 6 February 1788 by 6 am, during the bulk unloading of the women convicts, Betty Thackery left the ship Charlotte and excitedly jumped from her longboat to the beach before anyone else on the western side of the harbour at The Rocks in New South Wales. This made her the first and most widely known of the convict girls to run up the beach in Australia amidst much cheering from the crowd of waiting male convicts and guards.

On 14 July 1791, she received 25 lashes for coming in from her settlement without permission. She lived for a while with James Dodding and subsequently made her way to Van Diemen's Land (Tasmania) on the Porpoise.

On 28 January 1810, the Reverend Robert Knopwood married Betty to Samuel King, a marine private who had arrived aboard the ship Sirius of the First Fleet. They settled in the Derwent Valley. They were married for 39 years.

Betty King died 7 August 1856 at the age of 89, according to the Convict Records Office. She is buried next to her husband in the Methodist Chapel churchyard in Lavitta Road, Magra, Tasmania (3 km (1.9 mi) north of New Norfolk).
