= John Caesar =

Australian bushranger (c. 1763–1796)

- Born: c. 1763; Madagascar
- Died: 15 February 1796 (aged 32–33); Liberty Plains, Colony of New South Wales, Australia
- Other name: Black Caesar
- Children: Mary Anne Fisher Power
- Convictions: Theft (1786); Theft (1789)
- Penalty: Transportation – 7 years Transportation – life

John Caesar (c. 1763 – 15 February 1796), nicknamed "Black Caesar", was a convict and one of the first people from the African continent to arrive in Australia. He is considered to be the first Australian bushranger. (Note: Attributed to multiple sources)

Born in Madagascar, he was enslaved in the United States in the late 1770s. Caesar later moved to south England where he was tried in 1786 for stealing £12. His sentence was transportation to the Colony of New South Wales for seven years. In January 1788 he arrived in Botany Bay on the First Fleet convict ship Alexander. 15 months later Caesar was tried for stealing food and sentenced to transportation for life. He escaped into the bush but was caught two months later.

Caesar made another escape in 1789, but subsequently returned to the colony after being attacked by Aboriginals. He was sent to work on Norfolk Island, where he fathered a daughter with English-born convict Anne Power. He made a third escape in 1794. Caesar seriously wounded Aboriginal warrior Pemulwuy during a Bidjigal guerilla attack in late 1795. Caesar made his fourth and final escape from custody in December. Governor John Hunter offered a lavish reward for his capture. In February 1796, Caesar was shot and killed by former highwayman John Wimbow.

== Early life ==
"John Caesar" was born circa 1763; his birth name is unknown. Early newspaper reports stated he was born in the West Indies, (Note: Newspaper sources that reference Caesar as being from the West Indies:) though contemporary historians have suggested Madagascar might be his place of birth. The name Caesar was common amongst slaves, and it is likely he was given the name during his enslavement in Virginia or South Carolina in the late 1770s. Malagasy people were particularly prized in those areas.

By 1786, John Caesar was a servant living in the parish of St Paul, Deptford, in England. He may have fled to British lines seeking emancipation. It is also possible his slave owner was a loyalist who returned to England following the American Revolutionary War. In the Book of Negroes, a 1783 record of Black Loyalists departing North America, two young men aged fourteen and eighteen named Caesar are recorded travelling to Spithead in England. Historian Cassandra Pybus believes the fourteen-year-old, described as a "stout fellow", was John Caesar.

== Transportation to Australia ==
In early 1786, Caesar was charged with stealing £12 from a residence. Later that year, on 13 March, he was tried at Maidstone, Kent for stealing another £12 from another residence. His sentence was transportation to the penal colony of New South Wales for seven years, and he was sent to the hulk Ceres. Caesar embarked on 6 January 1787 on the convict transport ship Alexander of the First Fleet, as one of at least twelve black convicts. In May 1787, his age was estimated as 23, and his occupation was listed as "servant or labourer".

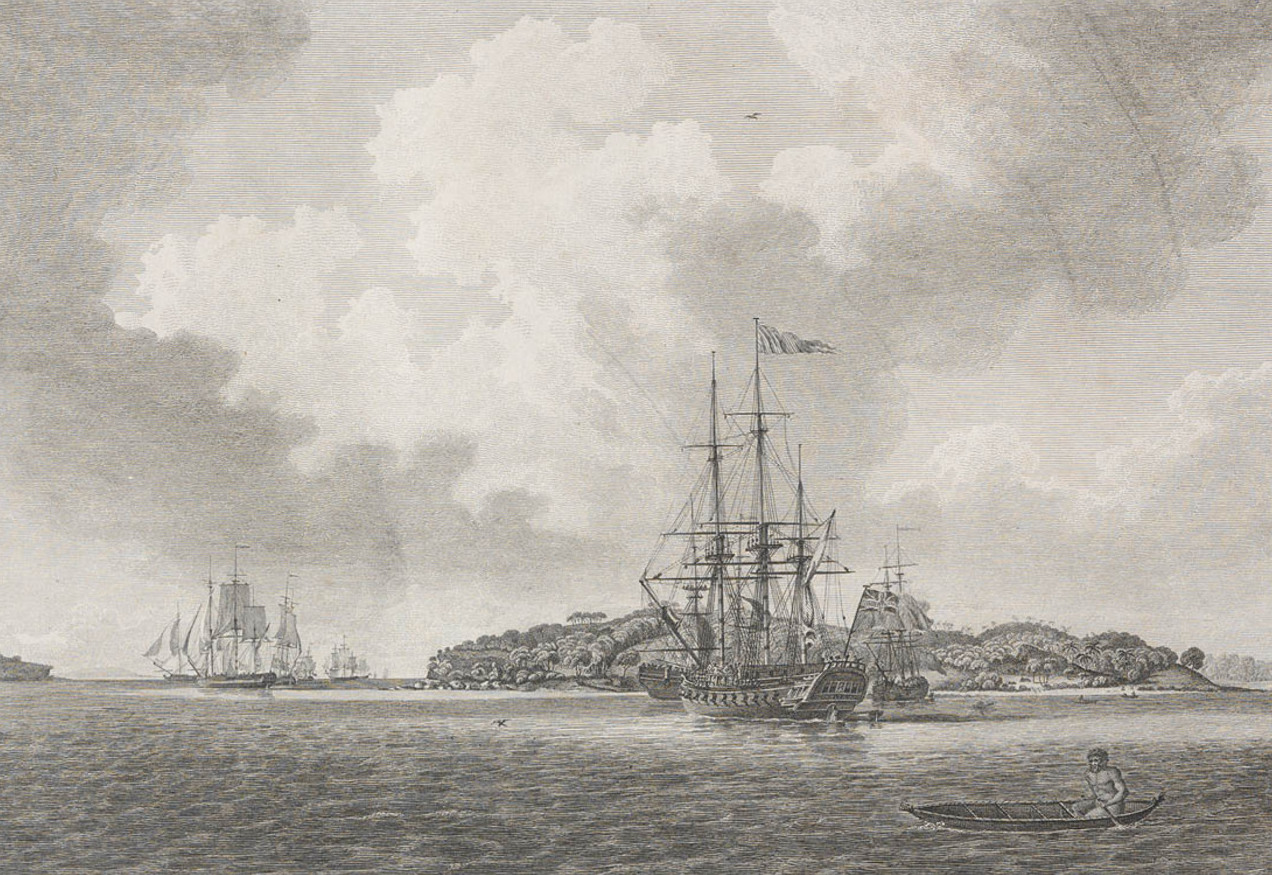
An engraving of the First Fleet in Botany Bay in 1788, from The Voyage of Governor Phillip to Botany Bay. Convict transports such as Alexander are depicted to the left.

Alexander arrived in Botany Bay with the First Fleet on 19 January 1788. Caesar was sent to work at Garden Island, one of the harshest penal colonies in New South Wales. He became known as "Black Caesar" and gained a reputation as a conscientious and hard worker.

== Convict life ==
=== Garden Island ===
Convicts were persistently malnourished due to insufficient food provisions. Garden Island was intended to provide fresh vegetables for the colony but attempts to grow food were mostly unsuccessful. The weekly allowance for convicts in 1790 was 1 kg of pork, 1.2 kg of flour and 1 kg of rice. Caesar, being six feet tall and muscular, was constantly hungry and took to stealing food. On 29 April 1789 he was tried for theft and sentenced to a second term of transportation, this time for life. Caesar took to the bush a fortnight later, reportedly with rations, an iron pot, and a musket (plus ammunition) stolen from marine Abraham Hand. At this time, British administrator David Collins, the colony's Judge-Advocate, called Caesar "an incorrigibly stubborn black".

Caesar stole a brickmaking gang's rations on 26 May and was pursued to no avail. On the night of 6 June he tried to steal food from the house of Zachariah Clark, the colony's assistant commissary for stores, and was caught by convict William Saltmarsh. Caesar was described by Collins after his first recapture as:

... so indifferent about meeting death, that he declared while in confinement, that if he should be hanged, he would create a laugh before he was turned off, by playing off some trick upon the executioner. Holding up such a mere animal as an example was not expected to have the proper or intended effect.

Caesar was sent back to Garden Island to work in chains. In addition to his rations, he was to be supplied with vegetables from the garden. He showed good behaviour and was eventually allowed to work with his chains removed. On 22 December 1789, Caesar escaped in a stolen canoe with a week's provisions. A few nights later, he stole an iron pot, a musket, and some ammunition. Caesar sustained himself by stealing food from local Aboriginal people and robbing colonists' gardens. However he struggled to survive when he lost his musket. Caesar was speared by local Aboriginal people on 30 January 1790. It is possible he was a known thief amongst the Aboriginal community. Caesar returned to camp the following day and surrendered to the authorities. (Note: According to Santilla Chingaipe, Caesar was captured at Rose Hill.) He attempted to clear his name by explaining he was wounded whilst trying to retake cattle the Aboriginals had stolen from the colonists. The authorities were certain Caesar had fabricated the story to avoid a lashing. He was sent to hospital for his injuries.

=== Norfolk Island ===
Governor Arthur Phillip pardoned Caesar for his previous infractions. In March, Caesar was sent to Norfolk Island on the Supply to assist Dr Dennis Considen. Norfolk Island was a labour camp notorious for its harsh punishments and poor living conditions. Caesar was provided with some degree of independence—by 1 July 1791, he was supporting himself on a lot at Queenborough and was issued with a hog. In January 1792, Caesar was given one acre of land and was ordered to work three days per week.

Caesar fathered a child with English-born convict Anne Power. Anne was similarly tried at Maidstone a year after Caesar, and arrived in 1790 on the Lady Juliana. Their daughter Mary Anne was born on 4 March 1792. Caesar left them both on Norfolk Island when he returned to Port Jackson on the Kitty in 1793. Caesar escaped briefly again in July 1794, and pillaged residences on the outskirts of town, but was captured shortly afterwards. Despite being heavily punished, Caesar contemptuously declared "all that would not make him better".

=== Pemulwuy ===
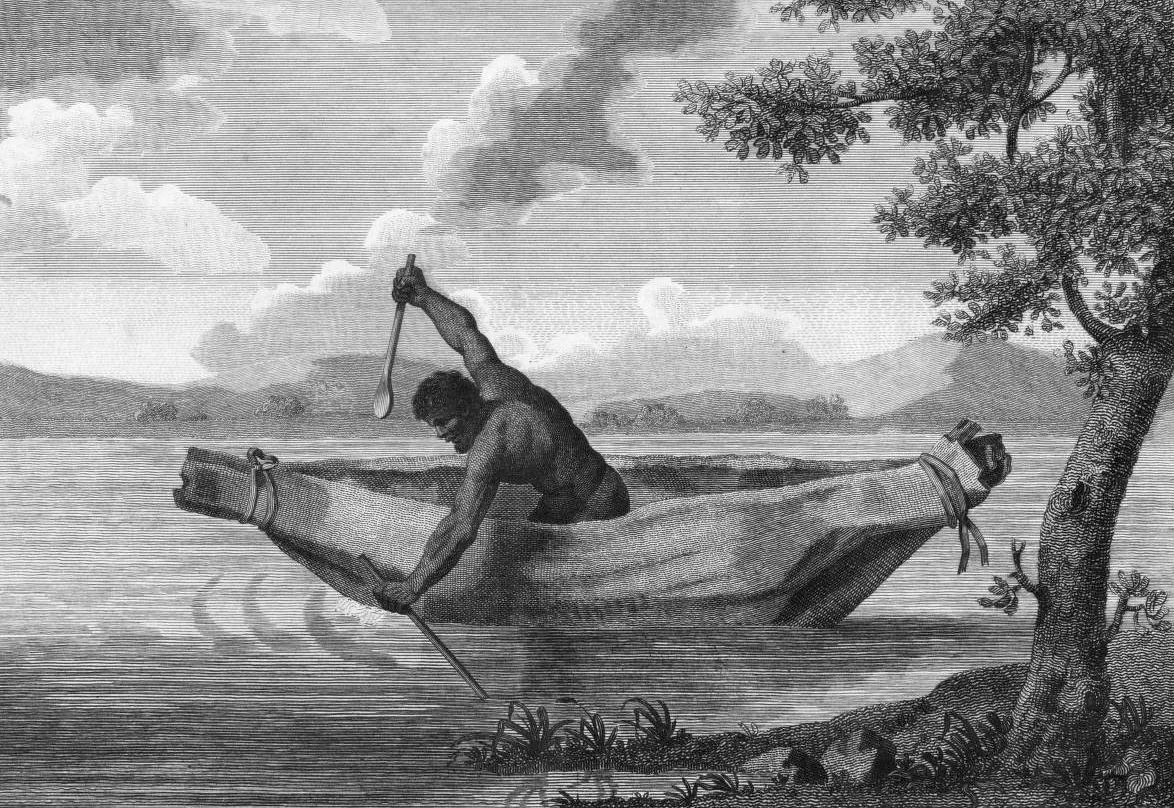
Caesar wounded the Bidjigal warrior Pemulwuy in late 1795.

Throughout the late 18th-century, Bidjigal warrior Pemulwuy raided colonists as part of a larger guerilla war against the colony's establishment. In late 1795, Caesar was part of a convict work party at Botany Bay that was attacked by Pemulwuy's warriors. During the fighting, Caesar seriously wounded Pemulwuy by cracking his skull. It was initially believed he had killed Pemulwuy, and thus Caesar was held in high esteem by the colonial authorities.

=== Final escape and death ===
Caesar escaped from custody for the final time in December 1795 and led a gang of fellow absconders in the Port Jackson area. Colonists were warned against supplying him with ammunition. On 29 January 1796, Governor John Hunter offered the generous reward of five gallons of spirits for Caesar's capture. According to Collins:

Notwithstanding the reward that had been offered for apprehending black Caesar, he remained at large, and scarcely a morning arrived without a complaint being made to the magistrates of a loss of property supposed to have been occasioned by this man. In fact, every theft that was committed was ascribed to him; a cask of pork was stolen from the millhouse, the upper part of which was accessible, and, the sentinels who had the charge of that building being tried and acquitted, the theft was fixed upon Caesar, or some of the vagabonds who were in the woods, the number of whom at this time amounted to six or eight.

Ex-highwayman John Wimbow and agriculturalist James Ruse tracked Caesar down at Liberty Plains (present-day Strathfield). (Note: A 1936 article in The World's News identified Wimbow's companion as agriculturalist James Ruse (incorrectly called John Ruse).) According to Collins,

[Wimbow and Ruse], allured by the reward, had been for some days in quest of [Caesar]. Finding his haunt, they concealed themselves all night at the edge of a brush which they perceived him enter at dusk. In the morning he came out, when, looking round him and seeing his danger, he presented his musket; but before he could pull the trigger Wimbow fired and shot him.

Caesar was taken to the hut of Thomas Rose where a few hours later he died of his wounds on 15 February. Collins wrote, "Thus ended a man, who certainly, during his life, could never have been estimated at more than one remove above the brute, and who had given more trouble than any other convict in the settlement."

== Legacy ==
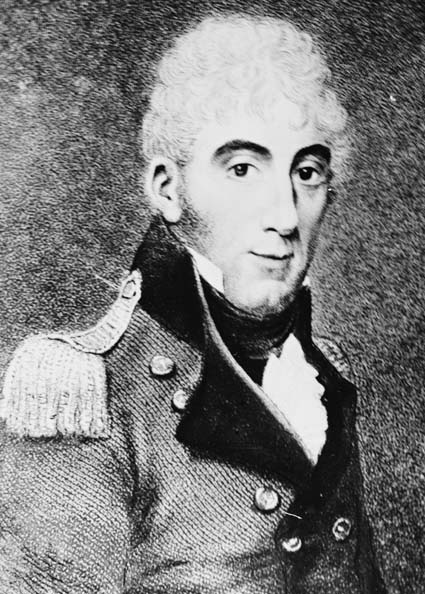
Caesar's life was primarily recorded by British officer David Collins.

Anne Power died on 25 March 1796 on Norfolk Island. Caesar and Anne's orphaned daughter was adopted by a woman named Hannah Fisher, and was baptised as Mary Anne Fisher Power in 1806. She left Norfolk Island for Van Diemen's Land in 1814.

According to Santilla Chingaipe, "from the archives alone, it is difficult to get a sense of Caesar as a person". Most of the extant records of Caesar's life were written by colonial authorities and as such reflect the racism of the time. David Collins wrote Caesar was "always reputed the hardest living convict in the colony ... but in his intellects he did not very widely differ from a brute". The historian Kimberly Cheek notes Caesar's life-spanning journey across four continents (Africa–North America–Europe–Australia) reflects "the broad global experiences of some Africans in the eighteenth century".

Caesar is considered to be the first Australian bushranger. Bushrangers hold a prominent role in Australian national identity, as exemplified by the impact of Ned Kelly's legacy on Australian culture. Since Australia's best-known bushrangers were white men of European descent, the fact that the country's earliest bushranger was a black man is considered particularly intriguing to historians. Chingaipe suspects Caesar's significance was forgotten because, as a black man, he did not fit into Australia's self-made cultural mythology. Other black convicts-turned-bushrangers include the Khoisan Peter Haley, the Jamaican William Buchanan and the Barbadian James Tierney.

== In popular culture ==
Caesar's death was illustrated by Percy Lindsay for Truth in 1934.

Caesar appears as a character in Thomas Keneally's 1987 novel The Playmaker, as well as in Timberlake Wertenbaker's 1988 stage adaptation Our Country's Good. The Playmaker follows a group of colonists in 1789 who stage a comedic play; Caesar the "mad Madagascan" is depicted as a rapist in leg irons who rudely interrupts said play.

Mohamed Osman portrayed Caesar in the 2021 SBS docudrama Our African Roots. Written and produced by Zambian-Australian historian Santilla Chingaipe, the series aimed to reveal how black people contributed to Australian national identity since the landing of the First Fleet.

== See also ==
- List of convicts transported to Australia
- African Australians
