= Arthur Bowes Smyth =

British naval surgeon (1750–1790)

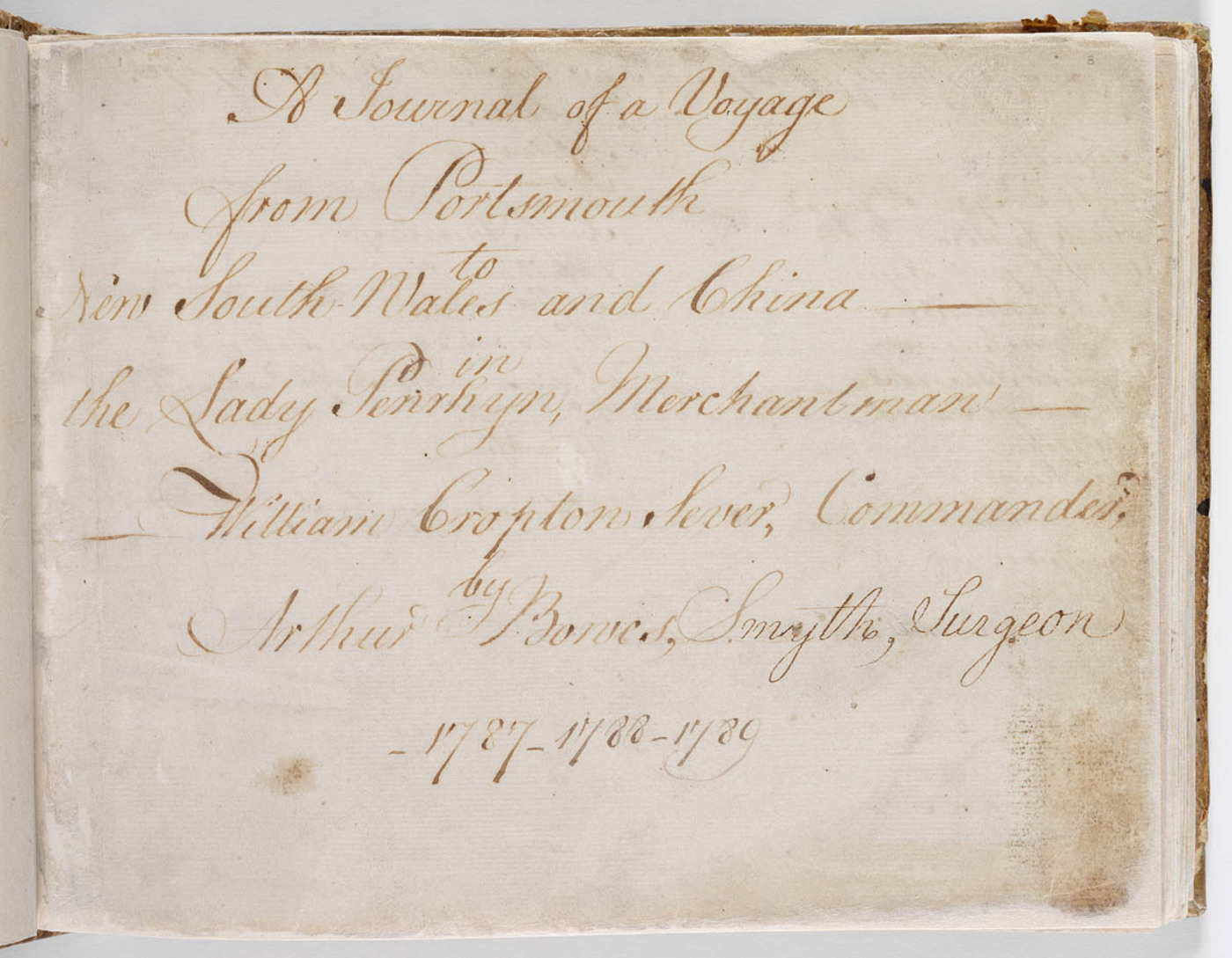
- Arthur Bowes Smyth - Title page of his journal
- Born: 23 August 1750; Tolleshunt D'Arcy, Essex, England
- Died: 31 March 1790 (aged 39); Tolleshunt D'Arcy, Essex, England
- Occupation: Surgeon
- Known for: Surgeon on Lady Penrhyn, diarist and natural history artist
- Parent(s): Thomas Smyth (surgeon) and Mary Smyth

Arthur Bowes Smyth (23 August 1750 – 31 March 1790) was a naval surgeon, who traveled on Lady Penrhyn as a part of the First Fleet that established a penal colony in New South Wales. Smyth kept a diary and documented the natural history he encountered in Australia.

== Early life and medical career ==
Arthur Bowes Smyth was born on 23 August 1750 at Tolleshunt D'Arcy, Essex, England, and was buried there shortly after his return to England on 31 March 1790. Son of Surgeon Thomas Smyth and the seventh of ten children, Arthur Bowes Smyth followed in his father's footsteps practising medicine in his place of birth until appointed "Surgeon to the Ship's Company" aboard the Lady Penrhyn in 1787.

Whilst Bowes Smyth practiced as a surgeon for a number of years before his appointment to the First Fleet, no evidence can be found of his medical qualifications. It has been surmised that "Surgeon" was an honorary title. He is known to have practiced midwifery in his local parish of Tolleshunt D'Arcy, Essex, an experience that served him well in his supervision of the women convicts on the Lady Penrhyn.

== First Fleet Journal as Surgeon on the Lady Penrhyn ==
Bowes Smyth boarded Lady Penrhyn on 22 March 1787 before the ship departed Portsmouth for New South Wales. Bowes Smyth took charge of the female prisoners on the Lady Penrhyn when the convicts' surgeon, John Turnpenny Altree, fell ill at Tenerife and, in Governor Arthur Phillip's opinion, had proved unequal to the task. Bowes, as he was known in the colony, kept a journal from 22 March 1787 to 12 August 1789. The journal is a detailed account of the voyage, recording weather observations, events on board, treatment of the sick and descriptions of ports of call en route—in particular, Rio de Janeiro and Cape Town. His journal is notable for its interest in natural history including descriptions of bird life at Port Jackson and Lord Howe Island on the Lady Penrhyn's return voyage. The journal contains 25 drawings in watercolour and ink, including the earliest known surviving illustration of the emu by a European. These elements provide a unique account different from the other First Fleet Journals. Bowes Smyth's journal is one of the most detailed eyewitness accounts of the first weeks of European settlement of Australia. The journal entries for 18–26 January record first impressions on arrival including interactions with Aboriginal communities and descriptions of the vegetation, intense heat, and native wildlife.

The convicts and their children who disembarked the Lady Penrhyn at Port Jackson are listed. Bowes Smyth's first journal entry, dated 22 March 1787, records the full crew list and the women convicts, their name, age, trade, crime, and term of transportation. The list of children born on the voyage contains inaccuracies regarding the sex of the child and dates of birth and death. The Lady Penrhyn, under charter to the British East India Company to continue her voyage to China for a cargo of tea, departed Port Jackson in early May. The journal continues, recording the return voyage via Lord Howe Island, Tahiti, China, St Helena, and finally England.

The original journal is now in the collection of the National Library of Australia and has been digitised for online viewing. Manuscript 'fair copies' are held in the British Library and State Library of New South Wales. The 24 illustrations in the copy held by the State Library of New South Wales have been separated from the original journal and digitised for online viewing. The full text from the manuscript has also been digitised for online viewing. The Journal was first published in 1979 by the Australian Documents Library

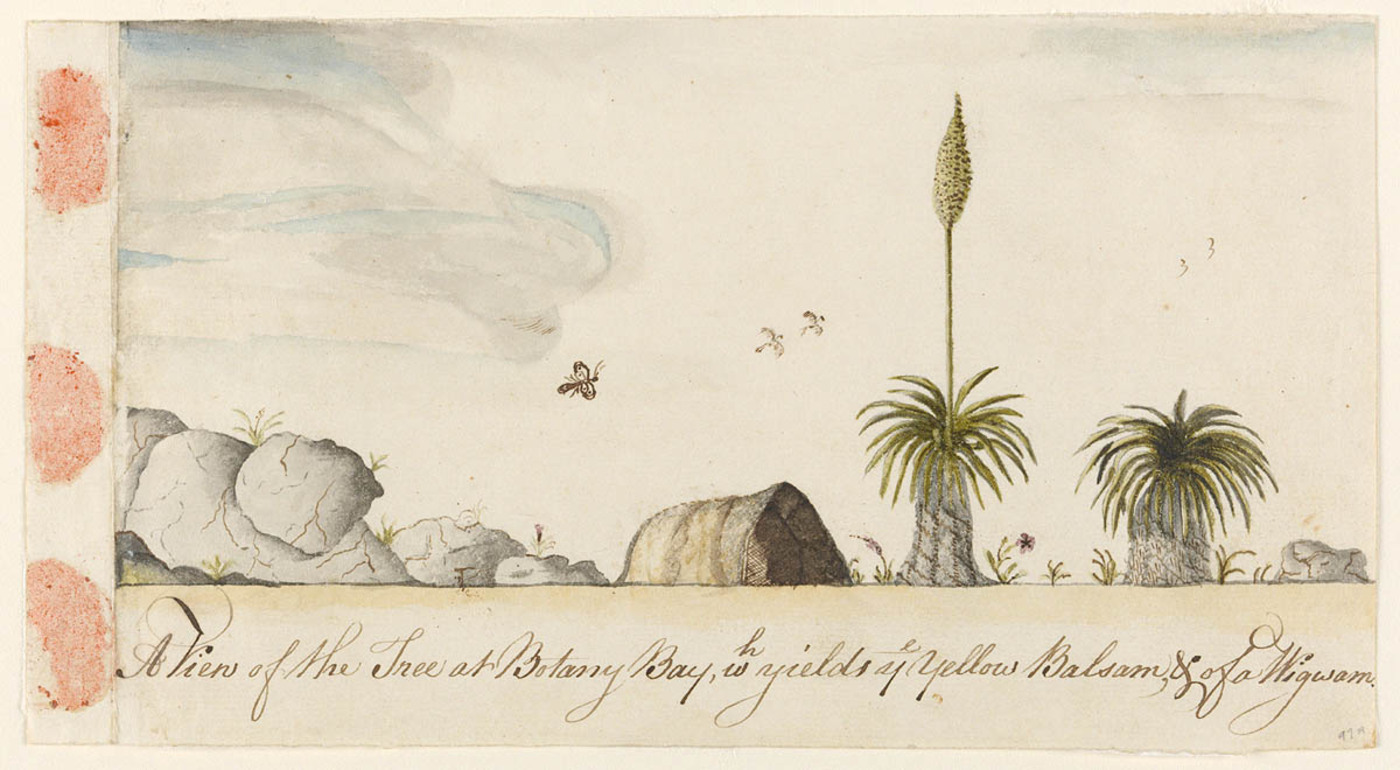
Grass tree, or `A View of the Tree at Botany Bay, wh yields ye Yellow Balsam, & of a Wigwan

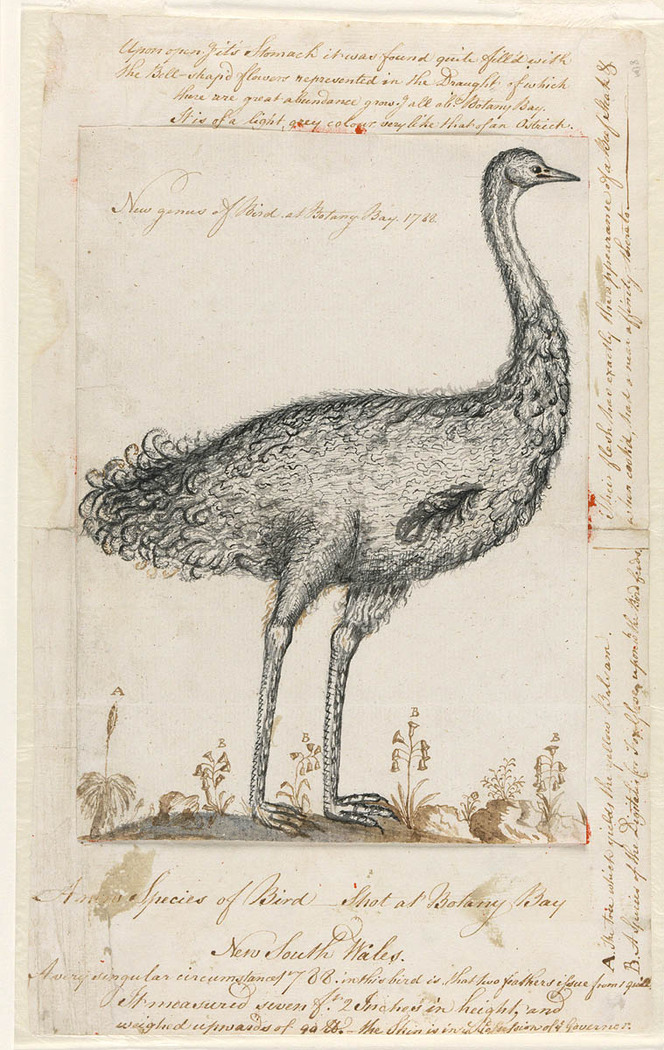
Drawing of an emu

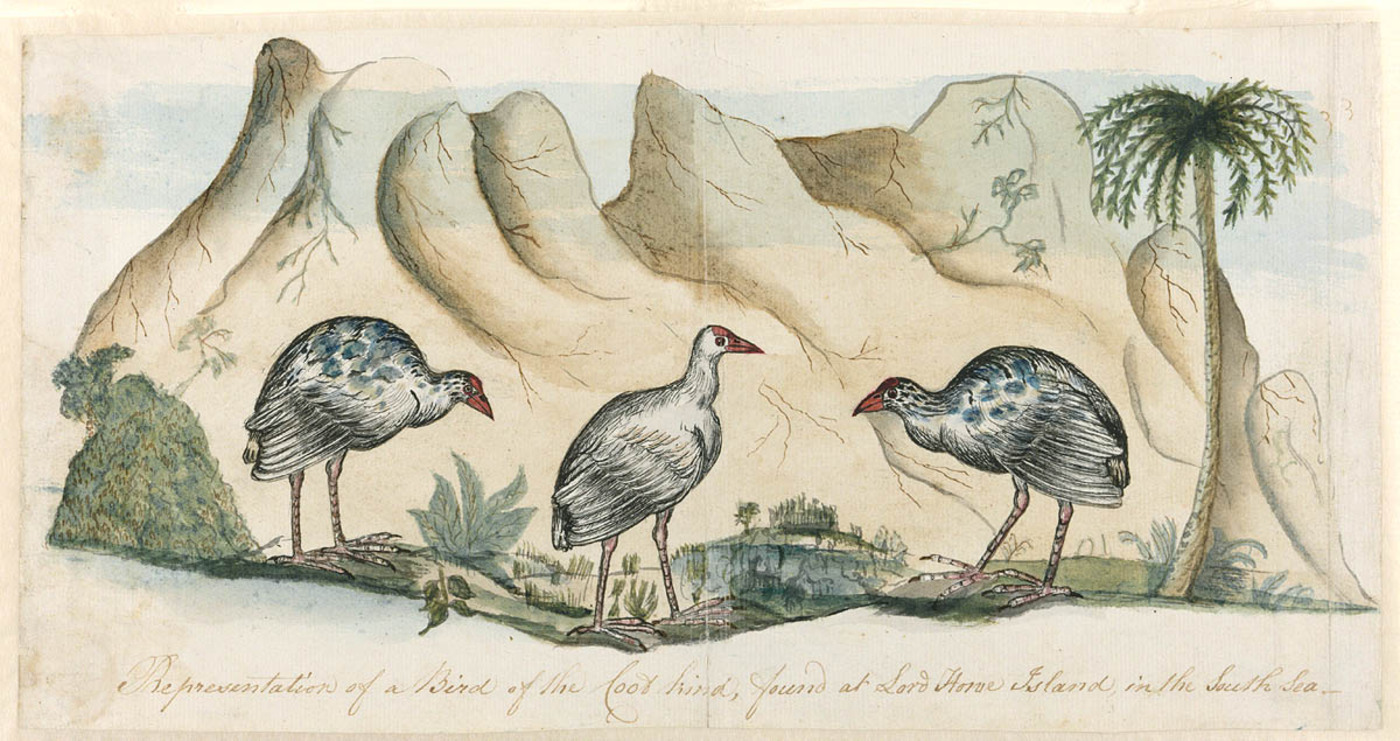
Representation of a Bird of the Coot kind, found at Lord Howe Island

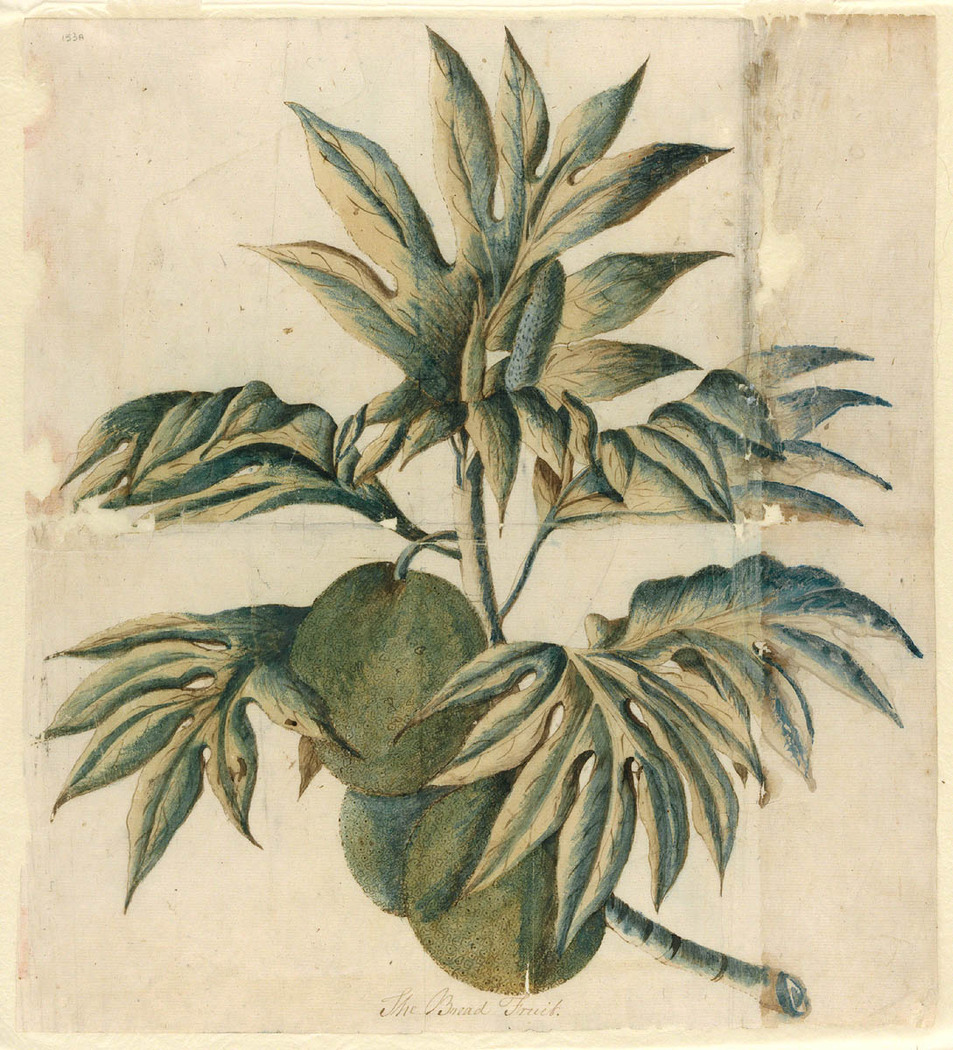
The Bread Fruit

== See also ==
- Journals of the First Fleet
