= First Fleet =

11 British ships establishing an Australian penal colony

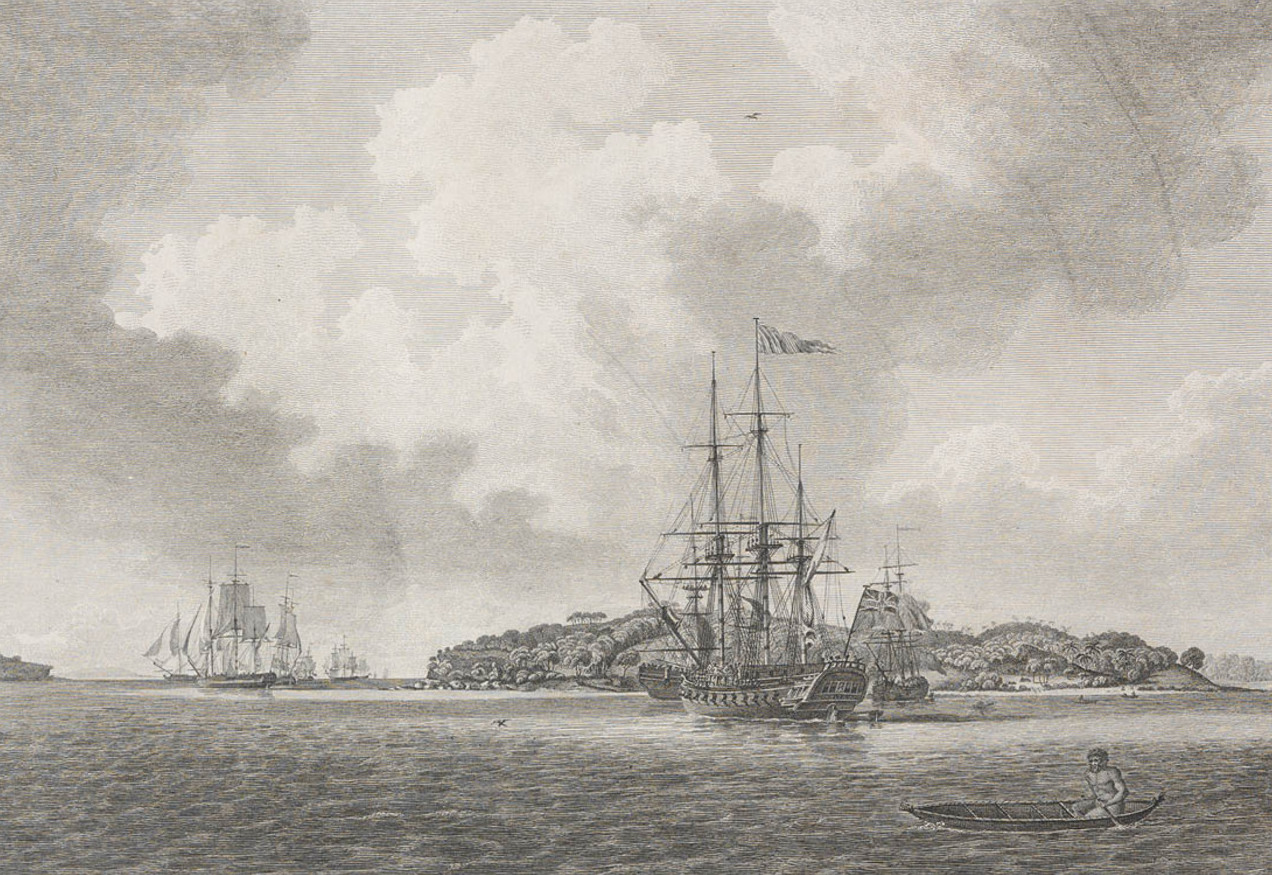
- Engraving of the First Fleet in Botany Bay at voyage's end in 1788
- Date: 13 May 1787 to 20 January 1788
- Duration: 250 days
- Location: Portsmouth, England, and Botany Bay, Colony of New South Wales
- Cause: Counter French imperialism in the Pacific and penal transportation
- Motive: Establishment of a penal colony
- Patrons: Lord Sandwich and Sir Joseph Banks
- Organised by: The Viscount Sydney as Secretary of State for the Home Office
- Participants: Captain Arthur Phillip, Governor of New South Wales and Major Robert Ross, Lieutenant-Governor of New South Wales
- Outcome: Beginning of European settlement in Australia
- Deaths: 48 died at sea

The First Fleet were eleven British ships which transported a group of settlers to mainland Australia, marking the beginning of the British (and European) colonisation of Australia. It consisted of two Royal Navy vessels, three storeships and six convict transports under the command of Captain Arthur Phillip. On 13 May 1787, the ships, with over 1,400 convicts, marines, sailors, and colonial officials on board, left Portsmouth and travelled over 24,000 kilometres (15,000 mi; 13,000 nmi) and over 250 days before arriving in Botany Bay, New South Wales, on 18 January 1788. Governor Arthur Phillip rejected Botany Bay, choosing instead Port Jackson to the north as the site for the new colony; the Fleet arrived there on 26 January 1788. The Fleet established the Colony of New South Wales as a penal colony; the first British settlement in Australia.

== History ==
Lord Sandwich, together with the President of the Royal Society, Sir Joseph Banks, the eminent scientist who had accompanied Lieutenant James Cook on his 1770 voyage, advocated establishment of a British colony in Australia at Botany Bay. Banks accepted an offer of assistance from the American Loyalist James Matra in July 1783. Under Banks's guidance, Matra rapidly produced "A Proposal for Establishing a Settlement in New South Wales" (24 August 1783), with a fully developed set of reasons for a colony composed of American Loyalists, Chinese, and South Sea Islanders (but not convicts). The decision to establish a colony in Australia was made by Thomas Townshend, Lord Sydney, Secretary of State for the British Home Office. This was taken for two reasons: the ending of transportation of criminals to North America following the American Revolution, as well as the need for a base in the Pacific to counter French expansion.

In September 1786, Captain Arthur Phillip was appointed Commodore of the fleet, which came to be known as the First Fleet, which was to transport the convicts and soldiers to establish a colony at Botany Bay. Upon arrival there, Phillip was to assume the powers of Captain General and Governor in Chief of the new colony. A subsidiary colony was to be founded on Norfolk Island, as recommended by Sir John Call and Sir George Young, to take advantage for naval purposes of that island's native flax (harakeke) and timber.

The cost to Britain of outfitting and dispatching the Fleet was £84,000 (about £11 million or US$15.68 million in 2025).

== Ships ==
=== Royal Naval escort ===
On 25 October 1786 the 10-gun HMS Sirius, lying in the dock at Deptford, was commissioned, and the command given to Phillip. The armed tender HMAT Supply (1759) was under command of Lieutenant Henry Lidgbird Ball, who was also commissioned to join the expedition. Lt. David Blackburn was the ship's Master. On 15 December, Captain John Hunter was assigned as second captain to Sirius to command in the absence of Phillip, whose presence, it was to be supposed, would be requisite at all times wherever the seat of government in that country might be fixed.

Naval escorts (departed England 13 May 1787)
Ship	Type	Master	Crew, officials, marines	From	Arrived Botany Bay	Duration (days)
HMS Sirius	10 gun	John Hunter	200	Portsmouth	20 January 1788	252
HMAT Supply	Armed tender	Henry Lidgbird Ball	55 + 2 (convicts transferred on route)	Spithead	18 January 1788	250

==== HMS Sirius ====
Sirius was Phillip's flagship for the fleet. She had been converted from the merchantman Berwick, built in 1780 for Baltic trade. She was a 520-ton, sixth-rate vessel, originally armed with ten guns, four six-pounders and six carronades, Phillip had ten more guns placed aboard.

After the fleet's arrival, the ship served the new colony, including a supply run to the Cape of Good Hope. Sirius was wrecked on a reef at Norfolk Island on 19 March 1790 while landing supplies, a disastrous loss for the isolated colony.

==== HMAT Supply ====
Supply was designed in 1759 by shipwright Thomas Slade, as a yard craft for the ferrying of naval supplies. Measuring 170 tons, she had two masts, and was fitted with four small 3-pounder cannons and six 1/2-pounder swivel guns. Her armament was substantially increased in 1786 with the addition of four 12-pounder carronades.

=== Convict transports ===
Convict transports (departed England 13 May 1787)
Ship	Type	Master	Crew	Marines	Arrived Botany Bay	Duration (days)	Convicts arrived (boarded)	
Ship	Type	Master	Crew	Marines	Arrived Botany Bay	Duration (days)	Males	Females
Alexander	Barque	Duncan Sinclair	30	41	19 January 1788	251	210; Two were pardoned	0
Charlotte	Transport	Thomas Gilbert	30	32	20 January 1788	252	100	24
Friendship	Brig	Francis Walton	25	42	19 January 1788	251	80	24; To Cape of Good Hope only, transferred to Lady Penrhyn
Lady Penrhyn	Transport	William Cropton Server	30	18	20 January 1788	252	0	101
Prince of Wales	Barque	John Mason	29	45	20 January 1788	252	2	47
Scarborough	Transport	John Marshall	30	50	19 January 1788	251	208	0

=== Food and supply transports ===
Ropes, crockery, agricultural equipment and a miscellany of other stores were needed. Items transported included tools, agricultural implements, seeds, spirits, medical supplies, bandages, surgical instruments, handcuffs, leg irons and a prefabricated wooden frame for the colony's first Government House. The party had to rely on its own provisions to survive until it could make use of local materials, assuming suitable supplies existed, and grow its own food and raise livestock.

Food and supply transports (depart England 13 May 1787)
Ship	Type	Master	Crew	Arr. Botany Bay	Duration (days)
Golden Grove	storeship	William Sharp	22	20 January 1788	252
Fishburn	storeship	Robert Brown	22	20 January 1788	252
Borrowdale	storeship	Hobson Reed	22	20 January 1788	252

==== Golden Grove ====
The reverend Richard Johnson, chaplain for the colony, travelled on the Golden Grove with his wife and servants.

=== Legacy ===
Scale models of all the ships are on display at the Museum of Sydney. The models were built by ship makers Lynne and Laurie Hadley, after researching the original plans, drawings and British archives. The replicas of Supply, Charlotte, Scarborough, Friendship, Prince of Wales, Lady Penrhyn, Borrowdale, Alexander, Sirius, Fishburn and Golden Grove are made from Western Red or Syrian Cedar.

Nine Sydney harbour ferries built in the mid-1980s are named after First Fleet vessels. The unused names are Lady Penrhyn and Prince of Wales.

== People ==
The majority of the people travelling with the fleet were convicts, all having been tried and convicted in Great Britain, almost all of them in England. Many are known to have come to England from other parts of Great Britain and, especially, from Ireland; at least 14 are known to have come from the British colonies in North America; at least 15 are identified as black (born in Britain, Africa, the West Indies, North America, India or a European country or its colony). The convicts had committed a variety of crimes, including theft, perjury, fraud, assault, robbery, for which they had variously been sentenced to death, which was then commuted to penal transportation for 7 years, 14 years, or the term of their natural life.

Four companies of marines volunteered for service in the colony, these marines made up the New South Wales Marine Corps, under the command of Major Robert Ross, a detachment on board every convict transport. The families of marines also made the voyage.

A number of people on the First Fleet kept diaries and journals of their experiences, including the surgeons, sailors, officers, soldiers, and ordinary seamen. There are at least eleven known manuscript journals of the First Fleet in existence as well as some letters.

The exact number of people directly associated with the First Fleet will likely never be established, as accounts of the event vary slightly. A total of 1,420 people have been identified as embarking on the First Fleet in 1787, and 1,373 are believed to have landed at Sydney Cove in January 1788. In her biographical dictionary of the First Fleet, Mollie Gillen gives the following statistics:

	Embarked at Portsmouth	Landed at Sydney Cove
Officials and passengers	15	14
Ships' crews	323	306
Marines	247	245
Marines' wives and children	46	45 + 9 born
Convicts (men)	582	543
Convicts (women)	193	189
Convicts' children	14	11 + 11 born
Total	1,420	1,373

While the names of all crew members of Sirius and Supply are known, the six transports and three store ships may have carried as many as 110 more seamen than have been identified – no complete musters have survived for these ships. The total number of persons embarking on the First Fleet would, therefore, be approximately 1,530 with about 1,483 reaching Sydney Cove.

According to the first census of 1788 as reported by Governor Phillip to Lord Sydney, the non-indigenous population of the colony was 1,030 and the colony also consisted of 7 horses, 29 sheep, 74 swine, 6 rabbits, and 7 cattle.

The following statistics were provided by Governor Phillip:

	Male	Female	Children	Total
Convicts & their children	548	188	17	753
Others	219	34	24	277
Total	767	222	41	1,030

The chief surgeon for the First Fleet, John White, reported a total of 48 deaths and 28 births during the voyage. The deaths during the voyage included one marine, one marine's wife, one marine's child, 36 male convicts, four female convicts, and five children of convicts.

=== Notable members of First Fleet ===
==== Officials ====
- Captain Arthur Phillip, R.N, Governor of New South Wales
- Major Robert Ross, Lieutenant Governor and commander of the marines
- Captain David Collins, Judge Advocate
- Augustus Alt, Surveyor
- John White, Principal Surgeon
- William Balmain, assistant Surgeon
- Richard Johnson, chaplain

==== Soldiers ====
- Lieutenant George Johnston
- Captain Watkin Tench
- Lieutenant William Dawes
- Lieutenant Ralph Clark

==== Sailors ====
- Captain John Hunter, commander of HMS Sirius
- Lieutenant Henry Lidgbird Ball, commander of HMAT Supply
- Lieutenant William Bradley, 1st lieutenant of HMS Sirius
- Lieutenant Philip Gidley King, commandant of Norfolk Island
- Arthur Bowes Smyth, ship's surgeon on Lady Penrhyn
- Lieutenant John Shortland, Agent for Transports
- John Shortland, son of above, 2nd mate of HMS Sirius

==== Convicts ====
- Thomas Barrett, first person executed in the colony
- Mary Bryant, with her husband, children and six other convicts escaped the colony and eventually returned to England
- John Caesar, bushranger
- Matthew Everingham, farmer, explorer and district constable
- Henry Kable, businessman
- James Martin, was part of the escape with Mary Bryant, wrote an autobiography
- James Ruse, farmer, one of the only ones in the colony at its establishment
- Robert Sidaway, baker, opened the first theatre in Sydney
- James Squire, brewer
- Frances Williams, first Welsh woman to settle in Australia

== Voyage ==
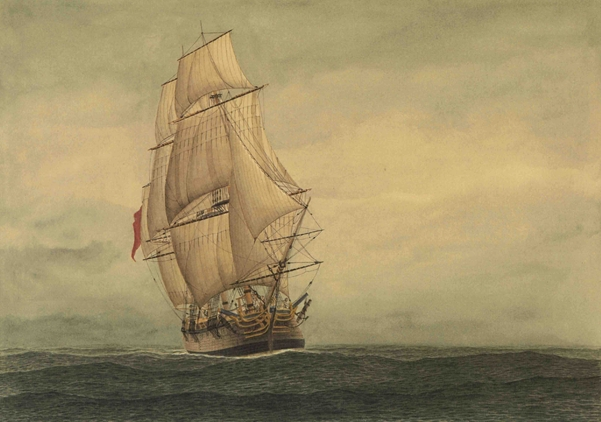
Lady Penrhyn

=== Preparing the fleet ===
In September 1786 Captain Arthur Phillip was chosen to lead the expedition to establish a colony in New South Wales. On 15 December, Captain John Hunter, was appointed Phillip's second. By now HMS Sirius had been nominated as flagship, with Hunter holding command. The armed tender HMAT Supply (1759) under command of Lieutenant Henry Lidgbird Ball had also joined the fleet.

With Phillip in London awaiting Royal Assent for the bill of management of the colony, the loading and provisioning of the transports was carried out by Lieutenant John Shortland, the agent for transports.

On 16 March 1787, the fleet began to assemble at its appointed rendezvous, the Mother Bank, Isle of Wight. His Majesty's frigate Sirius and armed tender Supply, three store-ships, Golden Grove, Fishburn and Borrowdale, for carrying provisions and stores for two years; and lastly, six transports; Scarborough and Lady Penrhyn, from Portsmouth; Friendship and Charlotte, from Plymouth; Prince of Wales, and Alexander, from Woolwich. On 9 May Captain Phillip arrived in Portsmouth, the next day coming aboard the ships and giving orders to prepare the fleet for departure.

=== Leaving Portsmouth ===
Phillip first tried to get the fleet to sail on 10 May, but due to a dispute by sailors of the Fishburn about pay, they refused to leave until it was resolved. The fleet finally left Portsmouth, England on 13 May 1787. The journey began with fine weather, and thus the convicts were allowed on deck. The Fleet was accompanied by the armed frigate HMS Hyaena until it left English waters. On 20 May 1787, one convict on Scarborough reported a planned mutiny; those allegedly involved were flogged and two were transferred to Prince of Wales. In general, however, most accounts of the voyage agree that the convicts were well behaved. On 3 June 1787, the fleet anchored at Santa Cruz at Tenerife. Here, fresh water, vegetables and meat were brought on board. Phillip and the chief officers were entertained by the local governor, while one convict tried unsuccessfully to escape. On 10 June they set sail to cross the Atlantic to Rio de Janeiro, taking advantage of favourable trade winds and ocean currents.

The weather became increasingly hot and humid as the Fleet sailed through the tropics. Vermin, such as rats, and parasites such as bedbugs, lice, cockroaches and fleas, tormented the convicts, officers and marines. Bilges became foul and the smell, especially below the closed hatches, was over-powering. While Phillip gave orders that the bilge-water was to be pumped out daily and the bilges cleaned, these orders were not followed on Alexander and a number of convicts fell sick and died. Tropical rainstorms meant that the convicts could not exercise on deck as they had no change of clothes and no method of drying wet clothing. Consequently, they were kept below in the foul, cramped holds. On the female transports, promiscuity between the convicts, the crew and marines was rampant, despite punishments for some of the men involved. In the doldrums, Phillip was forced to ration the water to three pints a day.

The Fleet reached Rio de Janeiro on 5 August and stayed for a month. The ships were cleaned and water taken on board, repairs were made, and Phillip ordered large quantities of food. The women convicts' clothing had become infested with lice and was burnt. As additional clothing for the female convicts had not arrived before the Fleet left England, the women were issued with new clothes made from rice sacks. While the convicts remained below deck, the officers explored the city and were entertained by its inhabitants. A convict and a marine were punished for passing forged quarter-dollars made from old buckles and pewter spoons. Ellen Fraser, mother of the second child of English parents born in the colony (John Fraser born 7 June 1789), is thought to be the female convict transferred from the "Prince of Wales" to the " Charlotte" during the stop over in Rio on 13 August 1787. Her husband, William Fraser was a convict on "Charlotte".

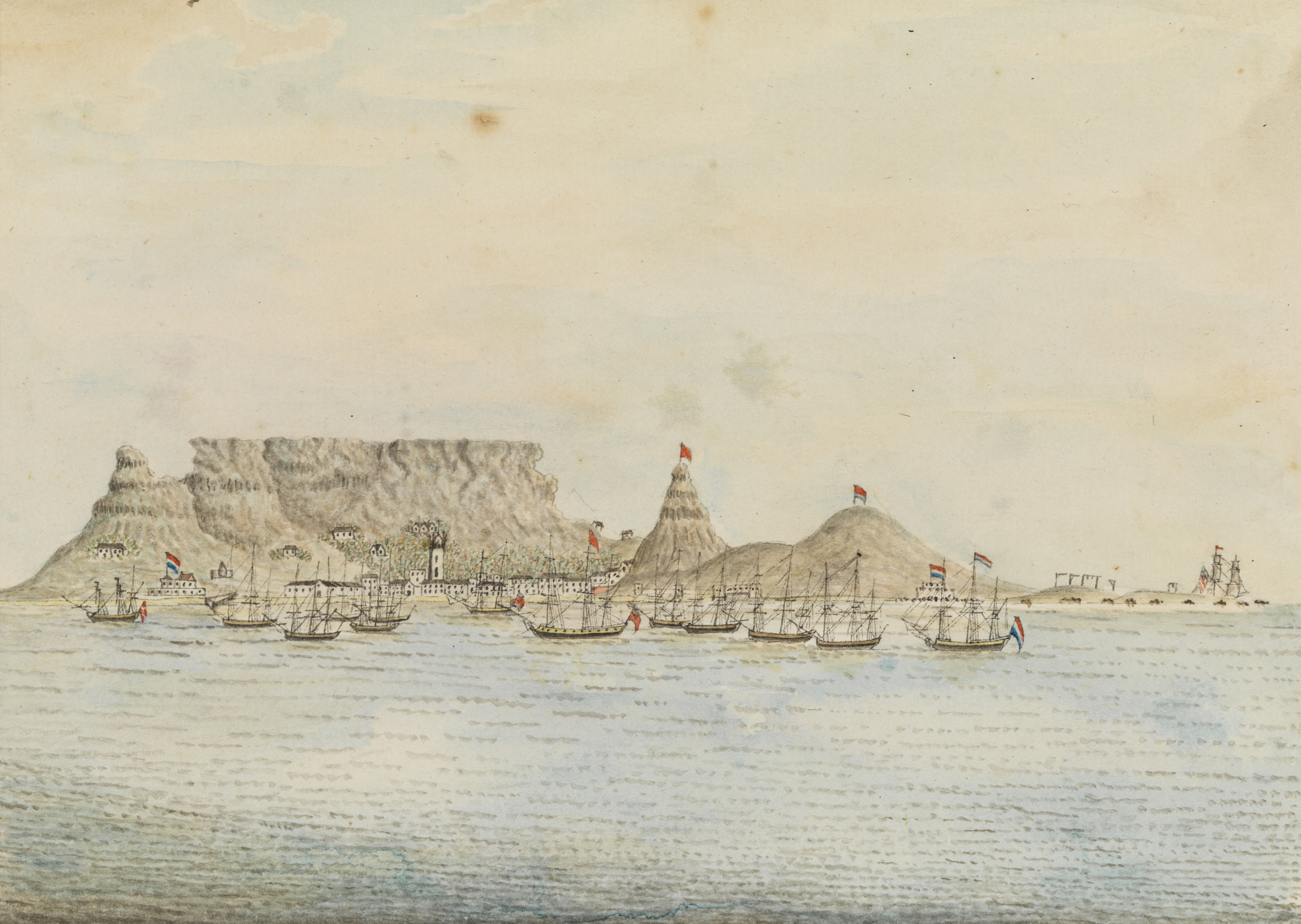
First Fleet, Cape Town, Table Mountain, South Africa, November 1787

The Fleet left Rio de Janeiro on 4 September to run before the westerlies to the Table Bay in southern Africa, which it reached on 13 October. This was the last port of call, so the main task was to stock up on plants, seeds and livestock for their arrival in Australia. The livestock taken on board from Cape Town destined for the new colony included two bulls, seven cows, one stallion, three mares, 44 sheep, 32 pigs, four goats and "a very large quantity of poultry of every kind". Women convicts on Friendship were moved to other transports to make room for livestock purchased there. The convicts were provided with fresh beef and mutton, bread and vegetables, to build up their strength for the journey and maintain their health. The Dutch colony of Cape Town was the last outpost of European settlement which the fleet members would see for years, perhaps for the rest of their lives. "Before them stretched the awesome, lonely void of the Indian and Southern Oceans, and beyond that lay nothing they could imagine."

Assisted by the gales in the "Roaring Forties" latitudes below the 40th parallel, the heavily laden transports surged through the violent seas. In the last two months of the voyage, the Fleet faced challenging conditions, spending some days becalmed and on others covering significant distances; Friendship travelled 166 miles one day, while a seaman was blown from Prince of Wales at night and drowned. Water was rationed as supplies ran low, and the supply of other goods including wine ran out altogether on some vessels. Van Diemen's Land was sighted from Friendship on 4 January 1788. A freak storm struck as they began to head north around the island, damaging the sails and masts of some of the ships.

On 25 November, Phillip had transferred to Supply. With Alexander, Friendship and Scarborough, the fastest ships in the Fleet, which were carrying most of the male convicts, Supply hastened ahead to prepare for the arrival of the rest. Phillip intended to select a suitable location, find good water, clear the ground, and perhaps even have some huts and other structures built before the others arrived. This was a planned move, discussed by the Home Office and the Admiralty prior to the Fleet's departure. However, this "flying squadron" reached Botany Bay only hours before the rest of the Fleet, so no preparatory work was possible. Supply reached Botany Bay on 18 January 1788; the three fastest transports in the advance group arrived on 19 January; slower ships, including Sirius, arrived on 20 January.

This was one of the world's greatest sea voyages – eleven vessels carrying about 1,487 people and stores had travelled for 252 days for more than 15,000 miles (24,000 km) without losing a ship. Forty-eight people died on the journey, a death rate of just over three percent.

=== Arrival in Australia ===
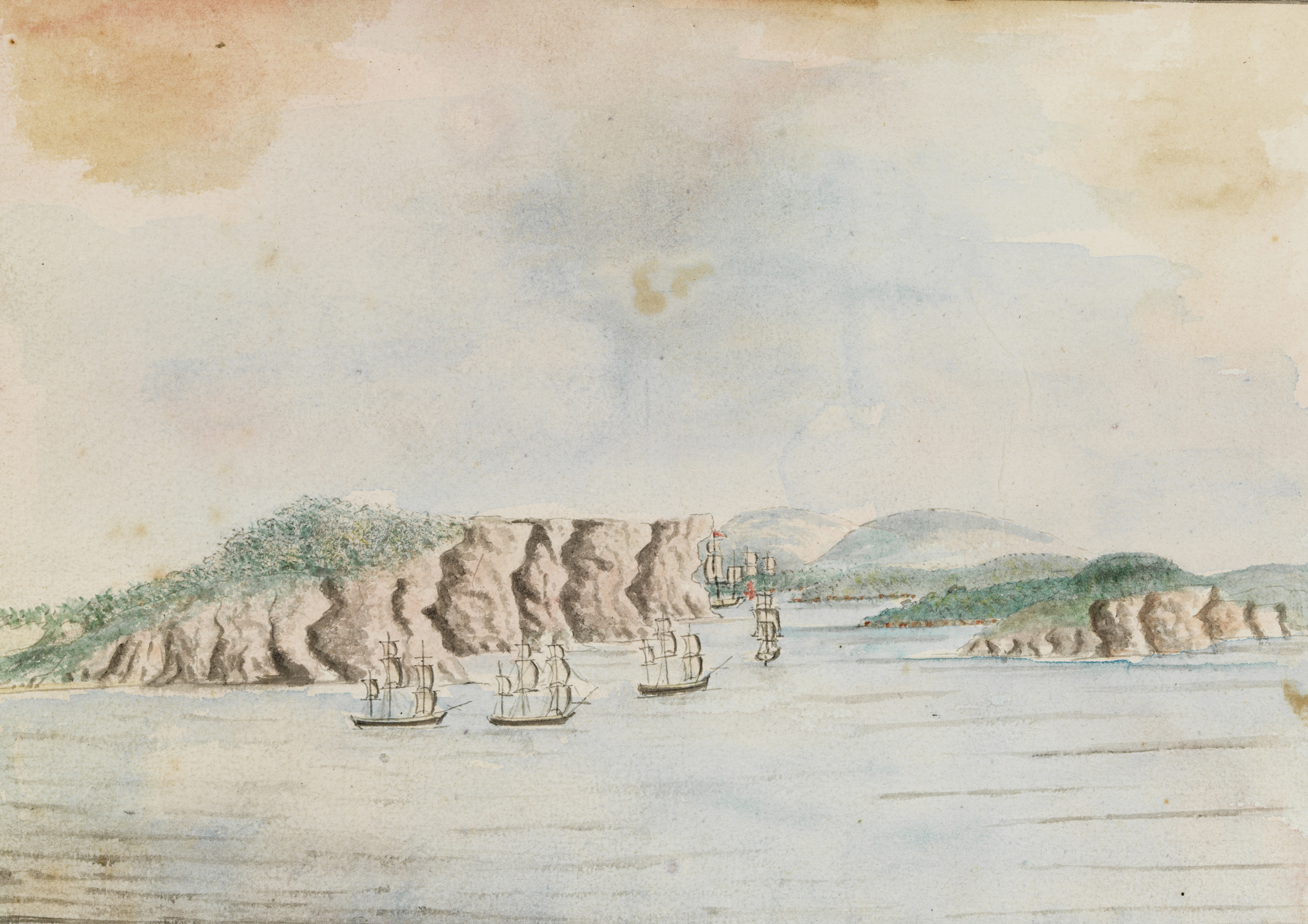
Entrance of Port Jackson, 27 January 1788, by William Bradley, an officer on HMS Sirius

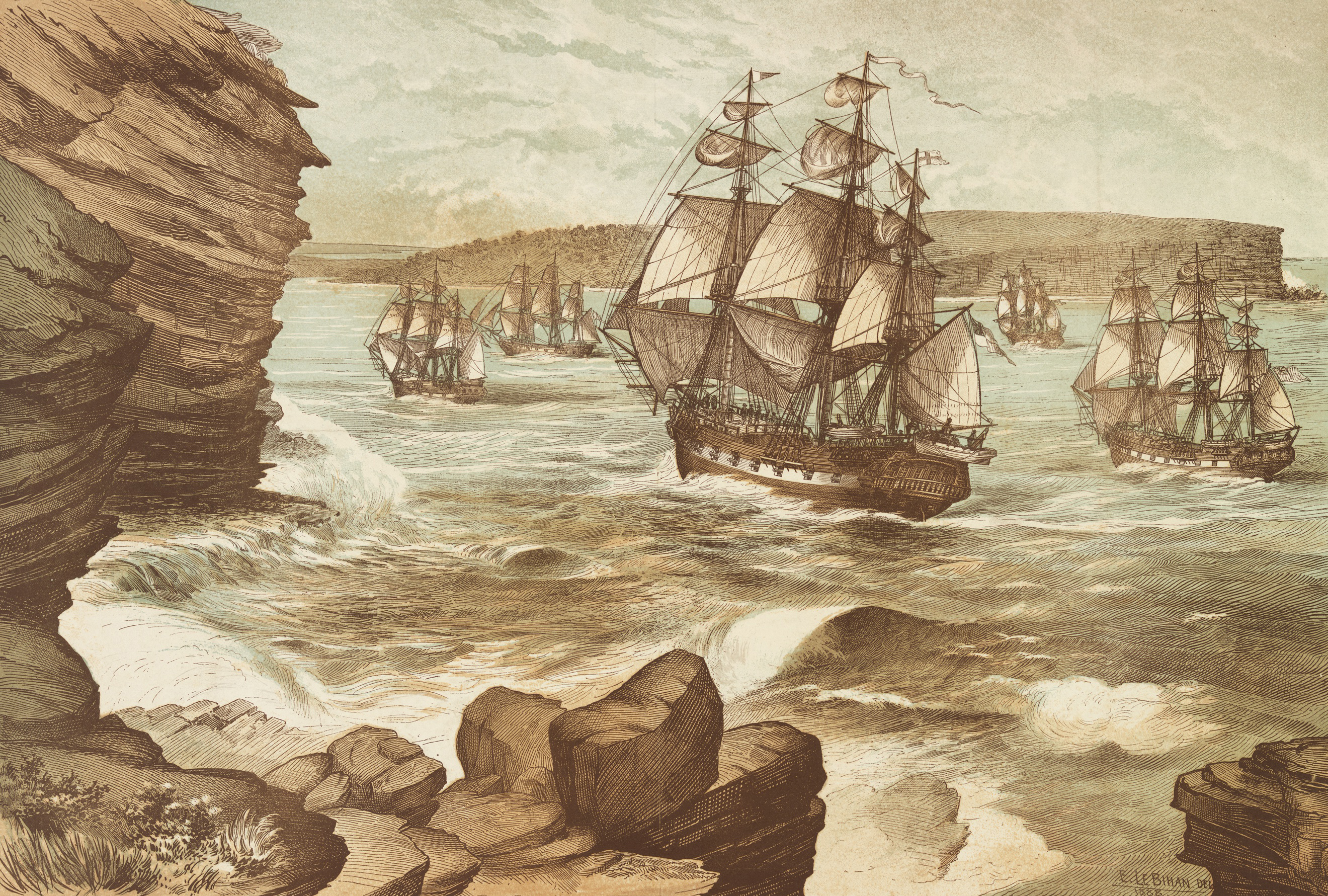
Lithograph of the First Fleet entering Port Jackson, January 1788, by Edmund Le Bihan

It was soon realised that Botany Bay did not live up to the glowing account that the explorer Captain James Cook had provided. The bay was open and unprotected, the water was too shallow to allow the ships to anchor close to the shore, fresh water was scarce, and the soil was poor. First contact was made with the local indigenous people, the Eora, who seemed curious but suspicious of the newcomers. The area was studded with enormously strong trees. When the convicts tried to cut them down, their tools broke and the tree trunks had to be blasted out of the ground with gunpowder. The primitive huts built for the officers and officials quickly collapsed in rainstorms. The marines had a habit of getting drunk and not guarding the convicts properly, whilst their commander, Major Robert Ross, drove Phillip to despair with his arrogant and lazy attitude. Crucially, Phillip worried that his fledgling colony was exposed to attack from those described as "Aborigines" or from foreign powers. Although his initial instructions were to establish the colony at Botany Bay, he was authorised to establish the colony elsewhere if necessary.

On 21 January, Phillip and a party which included John Hunter, departed the Bay in three small boats to explore other bays to the north. Phillip discovered that Port Jackson, about 12 kilometres to the north, was an excellent site for a colony with sheltered anchorages, fresh water and fertile soil. Cook had seen and named the harbour, but had not entered it. Phillip's impressions of the harbour were recorded in a letter he sent to England later: "the finest harbour in the world, in which a thousand sail of the line may ride in the most perfect security ...". The party returned to Botany Bay on 23 January.

On the morning of 24 January, the party was startled when two French ships, the Astrolabe and the Boussole, were seen just outside Botany Bay. This was a scientific expedition led by Jean-François de La Pérouse. The French had expected to find a thriving colony where they could repair ships and restock supplies, not a newly arrived fleet of convicts considerably more poorly provisioned than themselves. There was some cordial contact between the French and British officers, but Phillip and La Pérouse never met. The French ships remained until 10 March before setting sail on their return voyage. They were not seen again and were later discovered to have been shipwrecked off the coast of Vanikoro in the present-day Solomon Islands.

On 26 January 1788, the Fleet weighed anchor and sailed to Port Jackson. The site selected for the anchorage had deep water close to the shore, was sheltered, and had a small stream flowing into it. Phillip named it Sydney Cove, after Lord Sydney, the British Home Secretary. This date is celebrated as Australia Day, marking the beginning of British settlement. The British flag was hoisted that day. The remaining ships of the Fleet did not arrive at Sydney Cove until later that day. Writer and art critic Robert Hughes popularized the idea in his 1986 book The Fatal Shore that an orgy occurred upon the unloading of the convicts, though more modern historians regard this as untrue, since the first reference to any such indiscretions is as recent as 1963.

=== First contact ===
The First Fleet encountered Indigenous Australians when they landed at Botany Bay. The Cadigal people of the Botany Bay area witnessed the Fleet arrive and six days later the two ships of French explorer La Pérouse, the Astrolabe and the Boussole, sailed into the bay. When the Fleet moved to Sydney Cove seeking better conditions for establishing the colony, they encountered the Eora people, including the Bidjigal clan. A number of the First Fleet journals record encounters with Aboriginal people.

Although the official policy of the British Government was to establish friendly relations with Aboriginal people, and Arthur Phillip ordered that the Aboriginal people should be well treated, it was not long before conflict began. The colonists did not sign treaties with the aboriginal people. Between 1790 and 1810, Pemulwuy of the Bidjigal clan led the local people in a series of attacks against the colonists.

=== After January 1788 ===
The ships of the First Fleet mostly did not remain in the colony. Some returned to England, while others left for other ports. Some remained at the service of the Governor of the colony for some months: some of these were sent to Norfolk Island where a second penal colony was established.

1788

- 15 February – HMAT Supply sails for Norfolk Island carrying a small party to establish a settlement.
- 5/6 May – Charlotte, Lady Penrhyn and Scarborough set sail for China.
- 14 July – Borrowdale, Alexander, Friendship and Prince of Wales set sail to return to England.
- 2 October – Golden Grove sets sail for Norfolk Island with a party of convicts, returning to Port Jackson 10 November, while HMS Sirius sails for Cape of Good Hope for supplies.
- 19 November – Fishburn and Golden Grove set sail for England. This means that only HMAT Supply now remains in Sydney cove.

1789

- 23 December – HMS Guardian carrying stores for the colony strikes an iceberg and is forced back to the Cape. It never reaches the colony in New South Wales.

1790:

- 19 March – HMS Sirius is wrecked off Norfolk Island.
- 17 April – HMAT Supply sent to Batavia, Dutch East Indies, for emergency food supplies.
- 3 June – Lady Juliana, the first of six vessels of the Second Fleet, arrives in Sydney cove. The remaining five vessels of the Second Fleet arrive in the ensuing weeks.
- 19 September – HMAT Supply returns to Sydney having chartered the Dutch vessel Waaksamheyd to accompany it carrying stores.

== Legacy ==
=== Last survivors ===
On Saturday 26 January 1842 The Sydney Gazette and New South Wales Advertiser reported "The Government has ordered a pension of one shilling per diem to be paid to the survivors of those who came by the first vessel into the Colony. The number of these really 'old hands' is now reduced to three, of whom, two are now in the Benevolent Asylum, and the other is a fine hale old fellow, who can do a day's work with more spirit than many of the young fellows lately arrived in the Colony." The names of the three recipients were not given, and is academic as the notice turned out to be false, not having been authorised by the Governor. There were at least 25 persons still living who had arrived with the First Fleet, including several children born on the voyage. A number of these contacted the authorities to arrange their pension and all received a similar reply to the following received by John McCarty on 14 March 1842 "I am directed by His Excellency the Governor to inform you, that the paragraph which appeared in the Sydney Gazette relative to an allowance to the persons of the first expedition to New South Wales was not authorised by His Excellency nor has he any knowledge of such an allowance as that alluded to". E. Deas Thomson, Colonial Secretary.

Following is a list of persons known to be living at the time the false pension notice was published, in order of their date of death. At this time New South Wales included the whole Eastern seaboard of present-day Australia except for Van Diemen's Land which was declared a separate colony in 1825 and achieved self governing status in 1855–56. This list does not include marines or convicts who returned to England after completing their term in NSW and who may have lived past January 1842.

- Rachel Earley: (or Hirley), convict per Friendship and Prince of Wales died 27 April 1842 at Kangaroo Point, VDL (said to be aged 75).
- Roger Twyfield: convict per Friendship died 30 April 1842 at Windsor, aged 98 (NSW reg as Twifield).
- Thomas Chipp: marine private per Friendship died 3 July 1842, buried Parramatta, aged 81 (NSW Reg age 93).
- Anthony Rope: convict per Alexander died 20 April 1843 at Castlereagh NSW, aged 84 (NSW Reg age 89).
- William Hubbard: Hubbard was convicted in the Kingston Assizes in Surrey, England, on 24 March 1784 for theft. He was transported to Australia on Scarborough in the First Fleet. He married Mary Goulding on 19 December 1790 in Rose Hill. In 1803 he received a land grant of 70 acres at Mulgrave Place. He died on 18 May 1843 at the Sydney Benevolent Asylum. His age was given as 76 when he was buried at Christ Church St. Lawrence, Sydney on 22 May 1843.
- Thomas Jones: convict per Alexander died October 1843 in NSW, aged 87.
- John Griffiths: marine private per Friendship who died 5 May 1844 at Hobart, aged 86.
- Benjamin Cusely: marine private per Friendship died 20 June 1845 at Windsor/Wilberforce, aged 86 (said to be 98).
- Henry Kable: convict per Friendship died 16 March 1846 at Windsor, aged 84.
- John McCarty: McCarty was a marine private who sailed on Friendship. McCarty claimed to have been born in Killarney, County Kerry, Ireland, circa Christmas 1745. He first served in the colony of New South Wales, then at Norfolk Island where he took up a land grant of 60 acres (Lot 71). He married first fleet convict Ann Beardsley on Norfolk Island in November 1791 after his marine discharge a month earlier. In 1808, at the impending closure of the Norfolk Island settlement, he resettled in Van Diemen's Land later taking a land grant (80 acres at Herdsman's Cove Melville) in lieu of the one forfeited on Norfolk Island. The last few years of his life were spent at the home of Mr. William H. Budd, at the Kinlochewe Inn near Donnybrook, Victoria. McCarty was buried on local land 24 July 1846, six months past his 100 birthday, although this is very likely an exaggerated age.
- John Alexander Herbert: convict per Scarborough died 19 November 1846 at Westbury Van Diemen's Land, aged 79.
- Robert Nunn: convict per Scarborough died 20 November 1846 at Richmond, aged 86.
- John Howard: convict per Scarborough died 1 January 1847 at Sydney Benevolent Asylum, aged 94.
- John Limeburner: The South Australian Register reported, in an article dated Wednesday 3 November 1847: "John Limeburner, the oldest colonist in Sydney, died in September last, at the advanced age of 104 years. He helped to pitch the first tent in Sydney, and remembered the first display of the British flag there, which was hoisted on a swamp oak-tree, then growing on a spot now occupied as the Water-Police Court. He was the last of those called the 'first-fleeters' (arrivals by the first convict ships) and, notwithstanding his great age, retained his faculties to the last." John Limeburner was a convict on Charlotte. He was convicted on 9 July 1785 at New Sarum, Wiltshire of theft of a waistcoat, a shirt and stockings. He married Elizabeth Ireland in 1790 at Rosehill and together they establish a 50-acre farm at Prospect. He died at Ashfield 4 September 1847 and is buried at St John's, Ashfield, death reg. as Linburner aged 104.
- John Jones: Jones was a marine private on the First Fleet and sailed on Alexander. He is listed in the N.S.W. 1828 Census as aged 82 and living at the Sydney Benevolent Asylum. He is said to have died at the Benevolent Asylum in 1848.
- Jane/Jenny Rose: (née Jones), child of convict Elizabeth Evans per Lady Penrhyn died 29 August 1849 at Wollongong, aged 71.
- Samuel King: King was a scribbler (a worker in a scribbling mill) before he became a marine. He was a marine with the First Fleet on board Sirius (1786). He shipped to Norfolk Island on Golden Grove in September 1788, where he lived with Mary Rolt, a convict who arrived with the First Fleet on Prince of Wales. He received a grant of 60 acres (Lot No. 13) at Cascade Stream in 1791. Mary Rolt returned to England on Britannia in October 1796. King was resettled in Van Diemen's Land, boarding City of Edinburgh on 3 September 1808, and landed in Hobart on 3 October. He married Elizabeth Thackery on 28 January 1810. He died on 21 October 1849 at 86 years of age and was buried in the Wesleyan cemetery at Lawitta Road, Back River.
- Mary Stevens: (née Phillips), convict per Charlotte and Prince of Wales died 22 January 1850 at Longford Van Diemen's Land, aged 81.
- John Small: Convicted 14 March 1785 at the Devon Lent Assizes held at Exeter for Robbery King's Highway. Sentenced to hang, reprieved to 7 years' transportation. Arrived on Charlotte in First Fleet 1788. Certificate of freedom 1792. Land Grant 1794, 30 acre "Small's Farm" at Eastern Farms (Ryde). Married October 1788 Mary Parker also a First Fleet convict who arrived on Lady Penrhyn. John Small died on 2 October 1850 aged 90 years.
- Edward Smith: aka Beckford, convict per Scarborough died 2 June 1851 at Balmain, aged 92.
- Ann Forbes: (m.Huxley), convict per Prince of Wales died 29 December 1851, Lower Portland NSW, aged 83.
- Henry Kable Jnr: aka Holmes, b. 1786 in Norwich Castle prison, son of convict Susannah Holmes per Friendship and Charlotte, died 13 May 1852 at Picton, New South Wales aged 66.
- Lydia Munro: (m.Goodwin) per Prince of Wales died 29 June 1856 at Hobart, reg as Letitia Goodwin, aged 85.
- Elizabeth Thackery: Elizabeth "Betty" King (née Thackery) was tried and convicted of theft on 4 May 1786 at Manchester Quarter Sessions, and sentenced to seven years' transportation. She sailed on Friendship, but was transferred to Charlotte at the Cape of Good Hope. She was shipped to Norfolk Island on Sirius (1786) in 1790 and lived there with James Dodding. In August 1800 she bought 10 acres of land from Samuel King at Cascade Stream. Elizabeth and James were relocated to Van Diemen's Land in December 1807 but parted company sometime afterwards. On 28 January 1810 Elizabeth married "First Fleeter" Private Samuel King (above) and lived with him until his death in 1849. Betty King died in New Norfolk, Tasmania on 7 August 1856, aged 89 years. She is buried in the churchyard of the Methodist Chapel, Lawitta Road, Back River, next to her husband, and the marked grave bears a First Fleet plaque.
- John Harmsworth: marine's child b.1788 per Prince of Wales died 21 July 1860 at Clarence Plains Tasmania, aged 73 years.

=== Smallpox ===
Historians have disagreed over whether those aboard the First Fleet were responsible for introducing smallpox to Australia's indigenous population, and if so, whether this was the consequence of deliberate action.

In 1914, J. H. L. Cumpston, director of the Australian Quarantine Service, put forward the hypothesis that smallpox arrived in Australia with First Fleet. Some researchers have argued that any such release may have been a deliberate attempt to decimate the indigenous population. Hypothetical scenarios for such an action might have included: an act of revenge by an aggrieved individual, a response to attacks by indigenous people, or part of an orchestrated assault by the New South Wales Marine Corps, intended to clear the path for colonial expansion. Seth Carus, a former deputy director of the National Defense University in the United States wrote in 2015 that there was a "strong circumstantial case supporting the theory that someone deliberately introduced smallpox in the Aboriginal population".

Chris Warren, "Was Sydney's smallpox outbreak of 1789 an act of biological warfare against Aboriginal tribes?", ABC Radio National – Ockhams Razor (podcast) (2014); 13 minutes

Other historians have disputed the idea that there was a deliberate release of smallpox virus and/or suggest that it arrived with visitors to Australia other than the First Fleet. It has been suggested that live smallpox virus may have been introduced accidentally when Aboriginal people came into contact with variolous matter brought by the First Fleet for use in anti-smallpox inoculations.

In 2002, historian Judy Campbell offered a further theory, that smallpox had arrived in Australia through contact with fishermen from Makassar in Indonesia, where smallpox was endemic. In 2011, Macknight stated: "The overwhelming probability must be that it [smallpox] was introduced, like the later epidemics, by [Indonesian] trepangers ... and spread across the continent to arrive in Sydney quite independently of the new settlement there."

There is a fourth theory, that the 1789 epidemic was not smallpox but chickenpox – to which indigenous Australians also had no inherited resistance – that happened to be affecting, or was carried by, members of the First Fleet. This theory has also been disputed.

=== Commemoration Garden ===
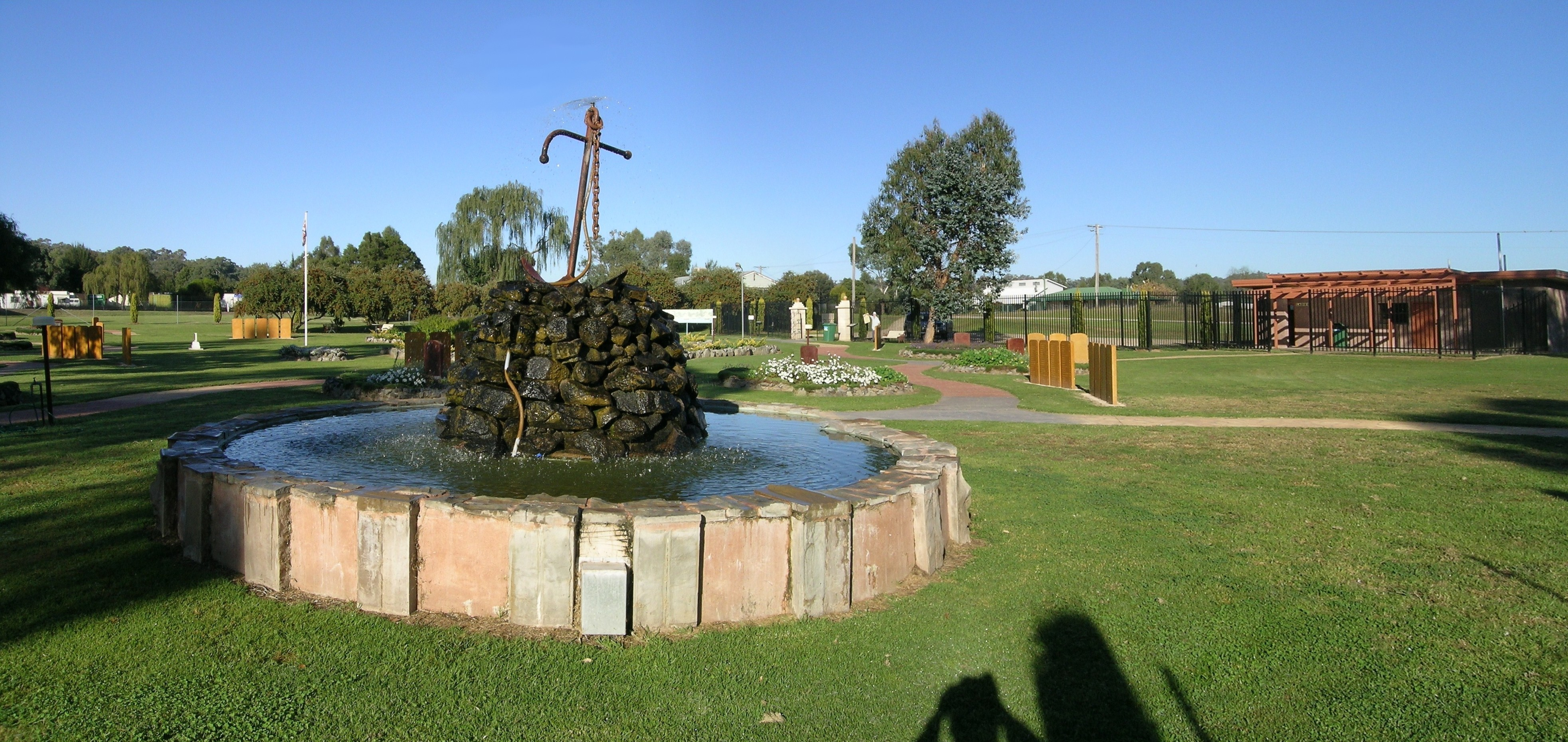
The First Fleet Memorial Garden, Wallabadah, New South Wales

After Ray Collins, a stonemason, completed years of research into the First Fleet, he sought approval from about nine councils to construct a commemorative garden in recognition of these immigrants. Liverpool Plains Shire Council was ultimately the only council to accept his offer to supply the materials and construct the garden free of charge. The site chosen was a disused caravan park on the banks of Quirindi Creek at Wallabadah, New South Wales. In September 2002 Collins commenced work on the project. Additional support was later provided by Neil McGarry in the form of some signs and the council contributed $28,000 for pathways and fencing. Collins hand-chiselled the names of all those who came to Australia on the eleven ships in 1788 on stone tablets along the garden pathways. The stories of those who arrived on the ships, their life, and first encounters with the Australian country are presented throughout the garden. On 26 January 2005, the First Fleet Garden was opened as the major memorial to the First Fleet immigrants. Previously the only other specific memorial to the First Fleeters was an obelisk at Brighton-Le-Sands, New South Wales. The surrounding area has a barbecue, tables, and amenities.

=== First Fleet Park ===
First Fleet Park is situated in The Rocks, near the site of the First Fleet's landing. The area has remained in public ownership continually since 1788, under the control of various agencies. It was previously used for a hospital, Queen's Wharf, shops and houses, the first Commissariat Store and the first post office. Archaeological remains are extant on the site dating back to the earliest days of settlement.

=== 1988 First Fleet Re-enactment Voyage ===
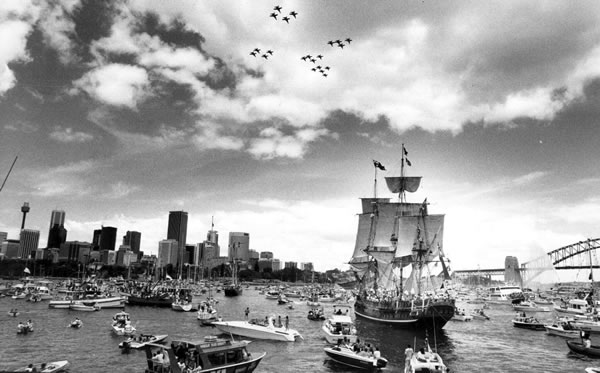
Tall ship First Fleet re-enactment on Sydney Harbour, Australia Day, 1988. The Australian Bicentenary was marked with much ceremony across Australia.

== See also ==
- Australian frontier wars
- Banished (TV series) – a short-lived 2015 dramatisation
- Botany Bay (1953) - film
- Convict women in Australia
- European exploration of Australia
- For the Term of His Natural Life – story by Marcus Clarke
- History of Indigenous Australians
- Prehistory of Australia
- Terra nullius
- Third Fleet (Australia)
