= Alexander (1783 ship) =

Transport ship of First Fleet

History

Great Britain
- Name: Alexander
- Owner: Walton & Company
- Port of registry: Hull
- Builder: Walton & Company, Hull
- Launched: 1783, or 1784
- Fate: Lost c.1809

General characteristics
- Tons burthen: 44485/94, 452, or 468
- Length: 114 ft (35 m)
- Beam: 31 ft (9.4 m)
- Sail plan: Ship rig; later barque
- Complement: 40
- Armament: 1799: 4 × 6-pounder + 2 × 4-pounder guns; 1810:4 × 6-pounder guns

Alexander was a merchant ship launched at Hull in 1783 or 1784. She was one of the vessels in the First Fleet, that the British government hired to transport convicts for the European colonisation of Australia in 1788. On her return voyage from Australia the British East India Company permitted her to carry a cargo from Canton back to Britain. Thereafter she traded out of London until 1809, when she is no longer listed.

== Construction and ownership ==
Alexander was barque-built in Hull in 1783 with three masts and two decks. She was a plain-looking vessel, without galleries or a figurehead. At 452 tons burthen, she was the largest transport in the Fleet and carried at least 30 crew. Her owners were Walton & Company, a firm of Southwark merchants headed by master mariner William Walton. Her master was Duncan Sinclair.

Lloyd's Register for 1786 gives her master as J. Metcalf, and her trade as Petersburg-London. An amendment to the entry gives the name of a new master as W. Hunter. Lastly, it shows her launch year as 1784, and her burthen as 650 tons (bm).

Lloyd's Register for 1787 shows her master as W. Hunter and her trade as London-St. Petersburg. However, a later addition to the entry shows her master as D. Sinclair, and her trade as London-Botany Bay. It does not report any armament, which is not surprising as Britain was not at war with anyone. It still shows her launch year as 1784 and her burthen as 650 tons (bm).

== First Fleet ==
=== Voyage to Australia ===
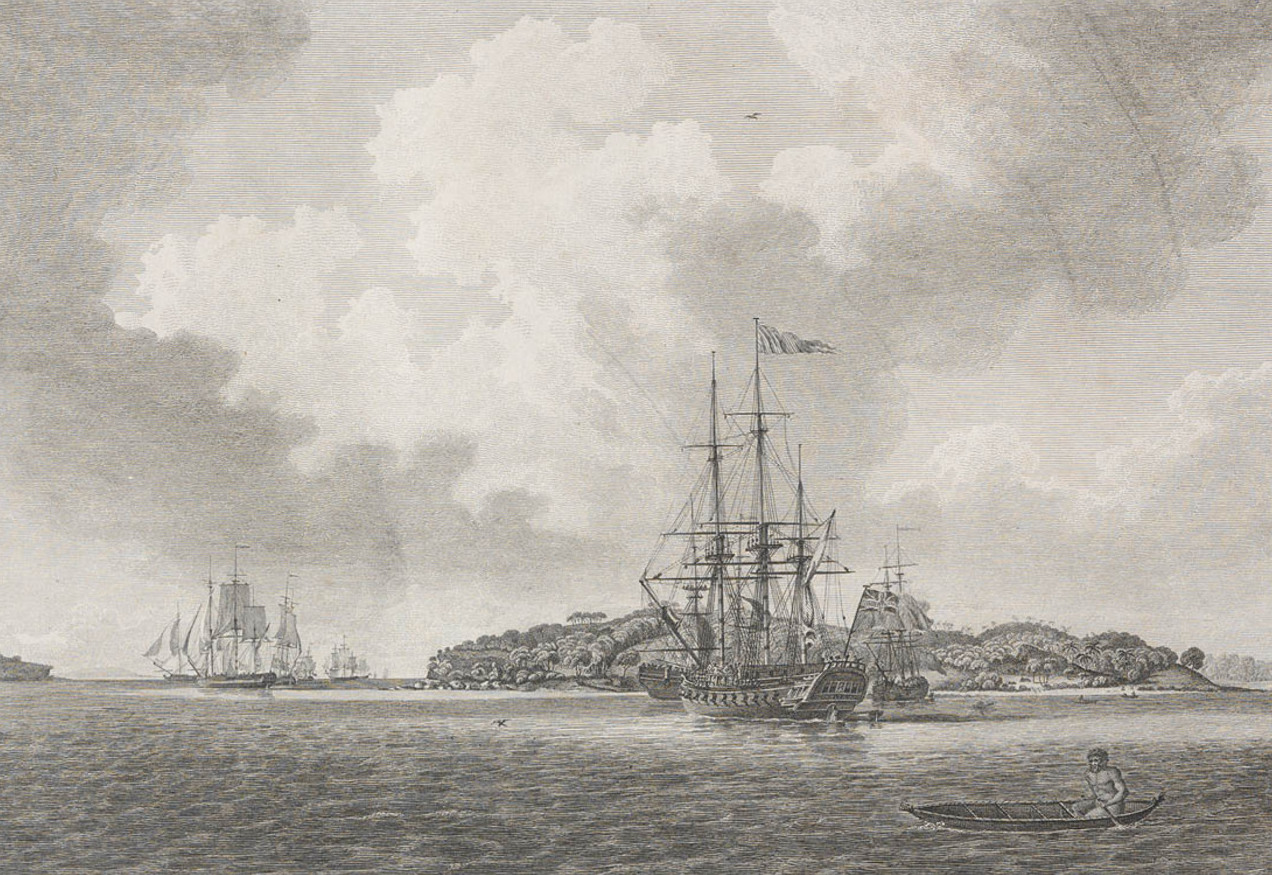
An engraving of the First Fleet in Botany Bay at voyage's end in 1788, from The Voyage of Governor Phillip to Botany Bay. Sirius is in the foreground; convict transports such as Alexander are depicted to the left.

In early 1787, Alexander loaded her convicts at Woolwich Docks. The convicts came both from prison hulks on the Thames and directly from Newgate Prison. The ship then sailed to Portsmouth alongside Lady Penrhyn to meet the remainder of the Fleet.

Before Alexander left Portsmouth, a fever broke out on board that killed 16 men. She left Portsmouth on 13 May 1787, carrying 195 male convicts. Fifteen more convicts died on the journey, the most for any ship in the fleet. The cause of the fever was likely inadequate management of the bilge, as reported by John White, the surgeon aboard HMS Sirius in June 1787:

The illness complained of was wholly occasioned by the bilge water which had by some means or other risen to so great a height that the panels of the cabin and the buttons on the clothes of the officers were turned nearly black by the noxious effluvia. When the hatches were taken off the stench was so powerful it was scarcely possible to stand over them. (Note: White, John (1790). John White: Surgeon General to the First Fleet. Debrett's, London. cited in Hill.)

Complaints by Surgeons White and Balmain to First Fleet captain Arthur Phillip led to regular pumping of Alexander's bilge thereafter, with a corresponding improvement in convict health.

=== Mutiny ===
Sinclair thwarted an attempted mutiny aboard the vessel in October 1787. A band of five convicts and a number of able seamen had armed themselves with iron bars, intending to overpower the guard and sail the vessel to the nearest landfall. Sinclair, aware of the plot through an informant, had crew and convicts locked below decks while the conspirators were identified. One of the mutineers was Philip Farrell. (Note: Philip Farrell, had been a bo'sun's mate aboard HMS Goliath, until he was convicted in 1784 of stealing a handkerchief worth 1 shilling and sentenced to seven years' transportation. Later, in April 1788, he was accused of stealing peas from the government store in Port Jackson, but acquitted due to a lack of witnesses. In 1790 Farrell was himself a victim of theft when another convict stole Farrell's personal supply of food.) A second mutineer was Thomas Griffiths. (Note: Thomas Griffiths, the former master of a French privateer, convicted at the Old Bailey in September 1784 for the theft of 140 yards (130 m) of black gauze from a warehouse in Bishopsgate.) Sinclair transferred them to Sirius, where they were flogged, and then sent aboard Prince of Wales for the remainder of the voyage to New South Wales. Sinclair transferred his informant to Scarborough for the informant's own protection.

=== Arrival in Botany Bay ===
After passing Tasmania, on 16 January Arthur Phillip transferred from the Flagship Sirius to the tender Supply and in company of the three fastest transports under John Shortland in Alexander, sailed ahead as the advance party, being the first ships to reach Botany Bay on 18 & 19 January 1788. After the decision was made to move the site of the colony, Alexander arrived at Port Jackson, Sydney, Australia, on 26 January 1788 to unload her convicts.

At Port Jackson Henry Kable, a convict, successfully sued Duncan Sinclair for the loss of his possessions during the voyage. In the first civil court case in Australia, Henry Kable won a restitution of 15 pounds.

=== Return to England ===
The British East India Company had hired Alexander in 1786 to carry tea from Canton after she had disembarked her convicts. She left Port Jackson on 14 July 1788 in company with Friendship, whose crew she picked up when that ship was scuttled at Batavia on her way to Canton.

Alexander arrived in the Thames on 1 June 1789. Unfortunately there is no readily accessible record of the return voyage.

Alexander carried with her to England the last papers of the French navigator Lapérouse, whose expedition's two ships had most likely already shipwrecked on the fringing reef of the island of Vanikoro in the Solomon Islands, as the French expedition had departed Botany Bay in March 1788 to head North with the intention of returning to Europe via the Torres Strait.

Lloyd's Register for 1789 showed Alexander's master as D. Sinclair, and her trade as London-Botany Bay. A later amendment to the entry gave the name of a new master, and a new trade, neither of which is legible. However, the amendment did correct the burthen from 650 to 445 tons (bm).

== Subsequent career ==
Lloyd's Register for 1790 had a legible entry for Alexander. It gave her master as L.D. Bruce, and her trade as London-Dominica. The year of launch was still 1784.

Issues of Lloyd's Register for 1799 to 1801 described Alexander as built in 1783 in Hull, of 468 tons burthen, and as trading between London and Petersburg. They lisedt her master as J. Fraser, and her owner as Leighton. Lloyd's List for 1802 repeated the information, and shows her travelling from London as a transport.

== Fate ==
The Register of Shipping still listed Alexander in 1810, with J. Frazer, master, and Leighton, owner. Her trade is that of a London-based transport. However, it had the notation "LOST" against her name.

== Post-script ==
An Urban Transit Authority First Fleet ferry was named after Alexander in 1985.

== Notable passengers ==
- John Caesar, later a well-known bushranger, and one of the earliest settlers of African descent in Australia.

== See also ==
- Journals of the First Fleet
- List of convicts on the First Fleet
