= Friendship (1784 ship) =

Australian First Fleet transport ship

History

Great Britain
- Name: Friendship
- Owner: George Moorson; Thomas Hopper; George Hopper; John Hopper
- Port of registry: Liverpool
- Launched: 1784, Scarborough
- Fate: Scuttled in the Straits of Makassar in 1788.

General characteristics
- Type: Brig
- Tons burthen: 262, 2781/94 or 300 (bm)
- Length: 75 feet (23 m) est.
- Beam: 23 feet (7.0 m) est.
- Sail plan: Brig

Friendship was a merchant brig built in Scarborough, England, and launched in 1784. As part of the Australian First Fleet, she transported convicts from England to New South Wales. Due to problems manning her, she was scuttled in the Makassar Strait in October 1788.

== Origins ==
After being launched, almost certainly in late 1784, she was sent to Antigua under Captain William Young in March 1785, returning late in the year, probably with a cargo of sugar and rum. She was then employed in the East Country coal trade, before being sent to St Petersburg in July 1786, for iron, hemp and planks.

She returned to the Thames on 10 October 1786, and four days later, she was tendered to the Navy Board by William Richards, the First Fleet contractor. The charter party between Richards and Thomas Hopper was signed on 23 November.

== Voyage to Australia ==
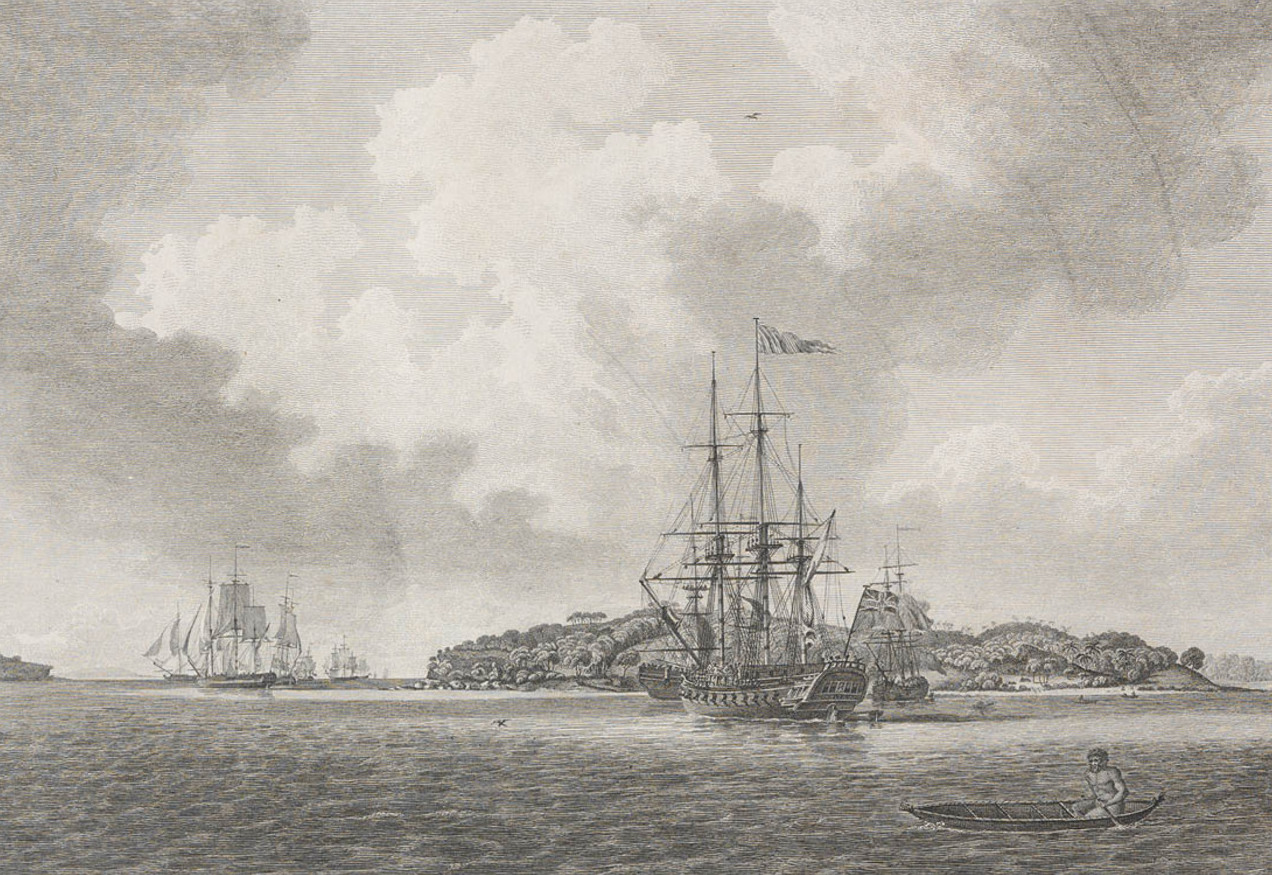
An engraving of the First Fleet in Botany Bay at the voyage's end in 1788, from The Voyage of Governor Phillip to Botany Bay.

Friendship left Portsmouth with the rest of the fleet on 13 May 1787; the smallest of the convict transports. Her master was Francis Walton and the surgeon assigned to her was Thomas Arndell. She was carrying 76 male and 21 female convicts, but there are small differences in various accounts of the number of people on board when she sailed. David Collins gave the following details in his book An Account of the English Colony in New South Wales: "The Friendship, ... of 228 tons, had on board 76 male and 21 female convicts; 1 captain, 2 lieutenants, 2 sergeants, 3 corporals, 1 drummer, and 36 privates, with 1 assistant surgeon to the colony." The Marines served as guards.

Some ten or twelve of the female convicts were particularly unruly, and promiscuous. At the Cape of Good Hope, Walton was instructed to transfer all the women to other transports to make room for livestock purchased there for the colony.

Friendship pulled up in 7 fathoms of water at the mouth of Sydney Cove, at around 8pm on 26 January 1788, the last of the fleet to come to anchor. Two of her female convicts had died on the voyage, one before the brig's arrival in Rio, and one after transfer to Lady Penrhyn.

The collection of the National Maritime Museum at Greenwich includes a silver medallion featuring an image of Friendship and the inscription "Success to the Friendship. 1787." and on the reverse, the inscription "F.W.", the initials of Francis Walton master of Friendship. Walton would have purchased this and had it engraved before the fleet sailed.

== Fate ==
Friendship sailed from Port Jackson on 14 July 1788, in company with Alexander, Borrowdale, and Prince of Wales, although a storm separated the latter two soon after all three had set sail. Alexander and Friendship were to make their way through the East Indies and return home direct.

Not having had fresh provisions since October 1787, when they were at the Cape, both crews were suffering badly from scurvy, and over the following months, Alexander lost 10 men (out of 30), and Friendship, one (out of 17), with many of those remaining being too sick to work. In late October, off the south-east coast of Borneo, having exhausted themselves in negotiating the sandbanks of the Balabalagan Islands, and concerned about an attack by pirates, the decision was made to scuttle Friendship, the smaller of the two ships, and concentrate the remaining men on Alexander.

On the evening of the 27 October (28 October by sea time), four holes were bored in both bows below the water mark, and she was cut adrift. The coordinates provided for her whereabouts were 2°36’ South, 117° East.

== Formal Protest ==
On their return, the owners lodged a formal protest with the Navy Board, seeking to recover the cost of the ship and its furnishings. The government resisted making compensation and the outcome of the matter is unknown.

== Commemoration ==
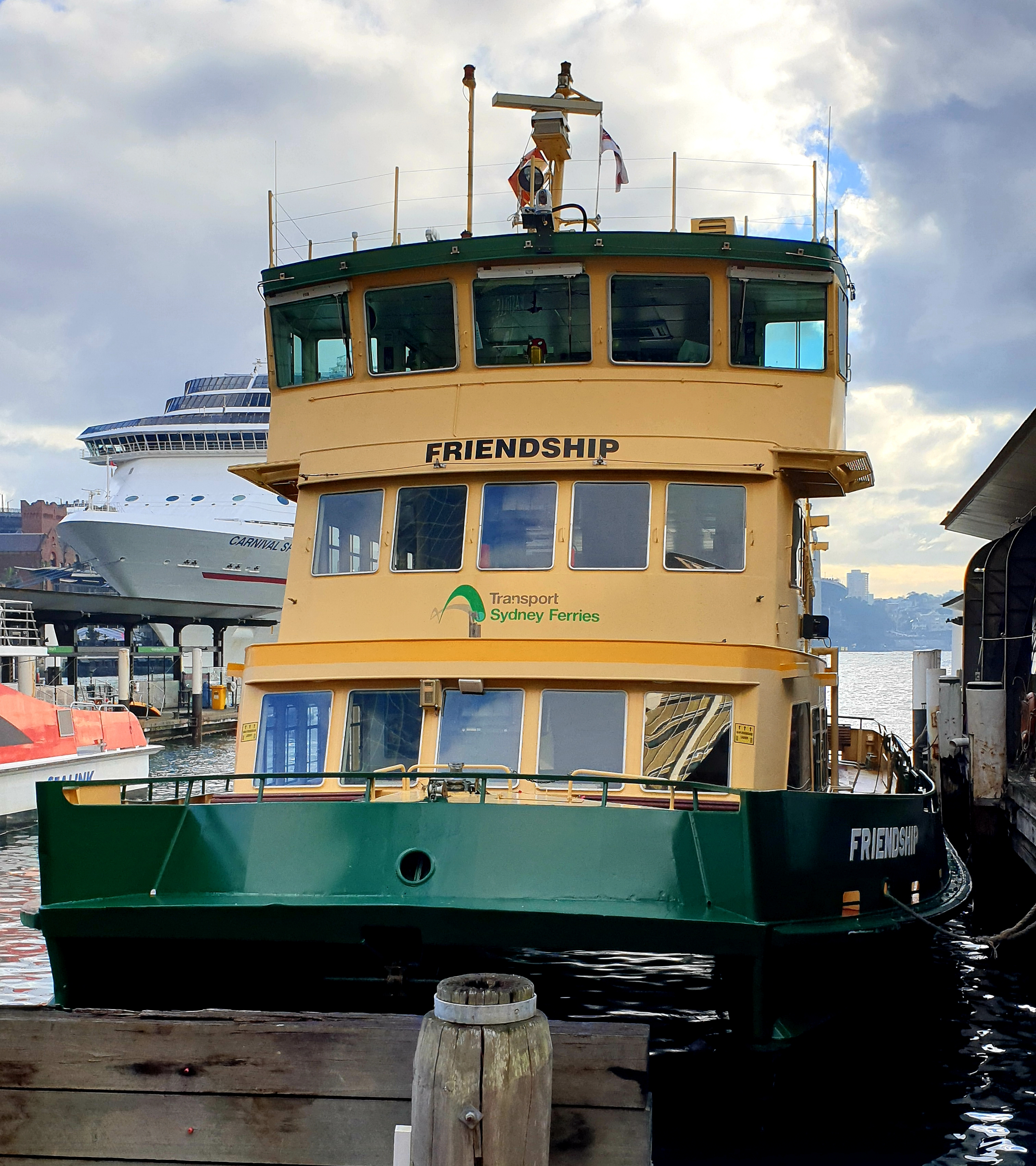
The Sydney ferry Friendship at Circular Quay.

An Urban Transit Authority First Fleet ferry was named after Friendship in 1986.

== See also ==
- List of convicts on the First Fleet
- Journals of the First Fleet
