= Lady Penrhyn (1786 ship) =

Transport ship in the First Fleet to Australia

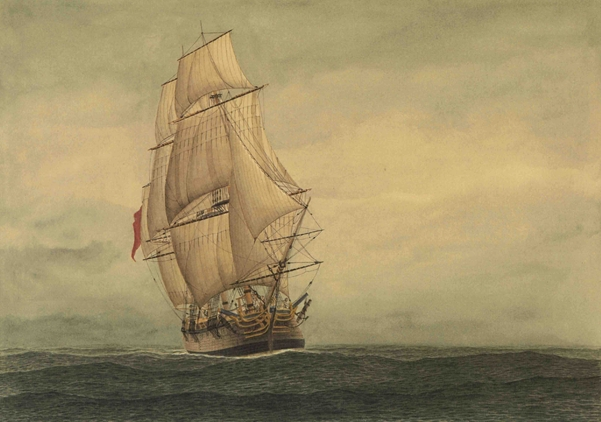

History

Great Britain
- Name: Lady Penrhyn
- Namesake: Lady Penrhyn (née Anne Susannah Warburton), the wife of Richard Pennant, 1st Baron Penrhyn, of the Penrhyn Estate in Llandygai, North Wales. The word Penrhyn itself is Welsh for headland or peninsula.
- Owner: Sir William Curtis (Curtis & Co.); William C. Sever
- Port of registry: London
- Builder: Edward Greaves, River Thames
- Launched: 1786
- Captured: 1811 and burnt

General characteristics
- Tons burthen: 322, or 332, or 3322/94, or 360 (bm)
- Length: Overall: 103 ft 5 in (31.5 m); Keel: 82 ft 3 1/2 in (25.1 m)
- Beam: 27 ft 6 1/2 in (8.4 m)
- Depth of hold: 12 ft 0 in (3.7 m)
- Propulsion: Sails
- Sail plan: Ship rig
- Armament: 10 × 9-pounder carronades

Lady Penrhyn was a British-built slave ship which took part in the First Fleet carrying transported convicts for the European colonisation of Australia.

Built on the River Thames in 1786, Lady Penrhyn was designed as a two-deck ship for use in the Atlantic slave trade, with a capacity of 275 slaves. She was part-owned by William Compton Sever, who served as ship's master on her voyage to Australia, and by London alderman and sea-biscuit manufacturer William Curtis. For her first voyage she transported convicts to New South Wales as part of the First Fleet. On her voyage back to Britain she was the first European vessel to pass by the Kermadec Islands, and the Penrhyn Atoll in the Cook Islands. She also carried a cargo for the British East India Company (EIC). The French captured her in the West Indies in 1811 and scuttled her.

== Voyage to Australia ==
Lady Penrhyn, William Sever, master, left Portsmouth on 13 May 1787, and arrived at Port Jackson, Sydney, Australia, on 26 January 1788. She carried 101 female convicts, and three officers and 41 other ranks of the New South Wales Marine Corps, as well as her crew. She was part of a convoy of eleven ships, the First Fleet, which brought over 1000 convicts, marines, and seamen to establish European settlement in Australia.

John Turnpenny Altree was surgeon to the convicts, and Arthur Bowes Smyth was surgeon to the crew. Bowes Smyth then took charge of the prisoners on the ship when Altree fell ill at Tenerife and in Governor Arthur Phillip's opinion had proved unequal to the task.

The list of stores unloaded from Lady Penrhyn on 25 March at Port Jackson has been widely quoted in books on the First Fleet. In Sydney Cove 1788 by John Cobley the amount of rice unloaded is given as 8 bram. This amount has been repeated in various books on the First Fleet. Bram, however, is not a unit of measurement and the original log entry lists the amount of rice as 8 barrels.

Lady Penrhyn also carried the first horses brought to Australia. These are believed to have consisted of one stallion, one colt, three mares, and two fillies from Cape Town, South Africa.

== Return voyage ==
Having discharged her convicts in New South Wales, Lady Penrhyn then was under contract to George Mackenzie McCaulay, an alderman of the City of London, to go to the "North West Coast of America to Trade for furrs & after that to proceed to China & barter the Furrs &ca for Teas or other such Goods..." Her owners had obtained a license to sail to the northwest coast from the South Sea Company, which still maintained its ancient monopoly rights over British trade to the eastern Pacific. Accordingly, she departed Sydney Cove on 5 May 1788 and sailed north with the intention of purchasing furs in Kamchatka for resale in China. Her course was chosen to minimise interaction with Russian vessels, as non-Russian trade in Kamchatka furs was considered by Russia to be smuggling.

On 31 May, Sever sighted the Kermadec Islands (Māori: Rangitāhua), and named Macauley Island after McCaulay and Curtis Island after William Curtis. The poor condition of the ship, and sickness among her crew, compelled Lady Penrhyn to turn back from this voyage when she had gone only as far as Matavai Bay, Tahiti, where the crew recovered and the ship was repaired. Sever then sailed to and named Penrhyn Island—the atoll of Tongareva in the Cook Islands—on 8 August, arriving at Macao on 19 October 1788, and proceeding upriver to Canton (now Guangzhou) to take on a cargo of tea.

Captain Sever left Whampoa on 8 January 1789 and Lady Penrhyn crossed the Second Bar on 14 January. She reached St Helena on 19 May and arrived at The Downs on 10 August.

== Later service ==
In 1789 Lady Penrhyn was sold to Wedderburn & Co., London and used in a regular run to Jamaica.

In 1795 she was one of a fleet of transports that carried British troops to the Caribbean to serve as reinforcements against the risk of an attack by Revolutionary France.

Year	Master	Owner	Trade	Source & notes
1795	T.Hayman	Curling	London–Jamaica	LR
1800	J.Spence; H.Mason	Hayman & Co. Law & Co.	London–Jamaica; London–Grenada	LR
1805	T.Burgess	Law & Co.	London–Grenada	LR
1810	T.Burgess	Law & Co.	London–Grenada	LR; large & damage repair 1804; thorough repair 1809

== Fate ==
On 22 July 1811 the French privateer Duc de Dantzig captured Lady Penrhyn while she was sailing from London to Grenada. Her captor set her on fire, scuttling her.

Lloyd's List reported that the privateer Duc de Dantzig, of 14 guns (18-pounder carronades) and 128 men, of Nantes, had captured Thames, Clark, master, on 17 July, and Lady Penrhyn, Burgess, master on 22 July. Thames had been sailing from London to St Vincent's, and Lady Penrhyn from London to Grenada. Both vessels were in ballast, and Duc de Danzig burnt them after taking off the people on board them. She then captured the schooner Ann, which had set out from Barbados to Demerara. Duc de Dantzig put her prisoners aboard Ann and let her proceed; Ann arrived at Barbados on 26 July.

== See also ==
- First Fleet
- Journals of the First Fleet
