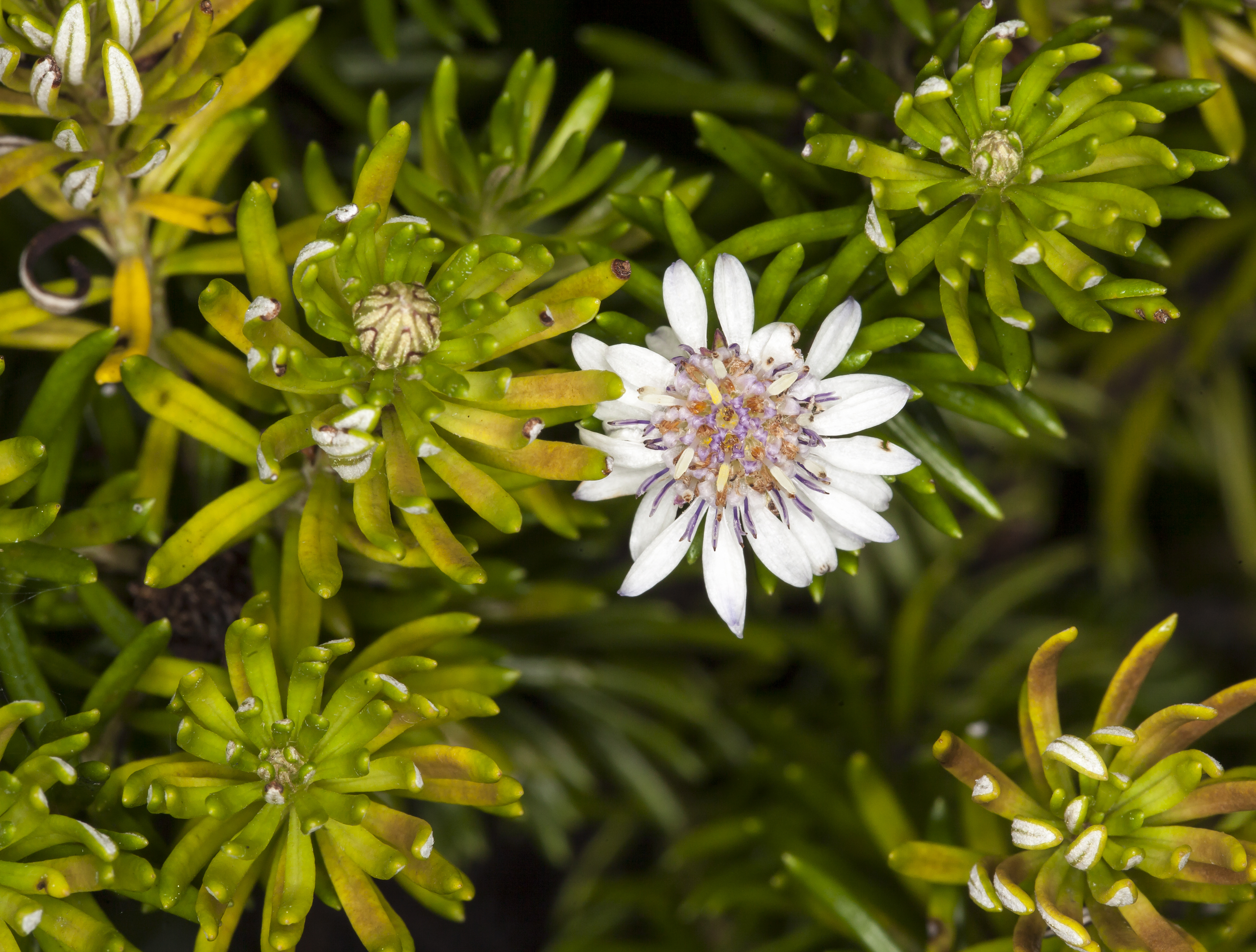
- Olearia ballii

Scientific classification
- Kingdom: Plantae
- Clade: Tracheophytes
- Clade: Angiosperms
- Clade: Eudicots
- Clade: Asterids
- Order: Asterales
- Family: Asteraceae
- Genus: Olearia
- Species: O. ballii

Binomial name
- Olearia ballii (F.Muell.) Hemsl.

Synonyms
- Aster balli F.Muell. orth. var.; Aster ballii F.Muell.; Olearia ballii F.Muell. nom. inval., pro syn.

= Olearia ballii =

Mountain daisy

Species of shrub

Olearia ballii, commonly known as mountain daisy, is a species of flowering plant in the family Asteraceae and is endemic to Lord Howe Island. It is a dense shrub with crowded linear leaves and small, purplish and white, daisy-like inflorescences.

== Description ==
Olearia ballii is a dense shrub that typically grows to a height of up to 1.5 m (4 ft 11 in). It has crowded, more or less sessile, linear leaves 5–12 mm (0.20–0.47 in) long and 0.5–1.5 mm (0.020–0.059 in) wide with the edges rolled under and white, woolly hairs on the lower surface. The heads or daisy-like "flowers" are arranged singly in on the ends of the branchlets and are 15–20 mm (0.59–0.79 in) in diameter and sessile, with softly-hairy bracts forming an involucre at the base. Each head has twenty to thirty ray florets, the white petal-like ligules up to 8 mm (0.31 in) long with purple tips, surrounding about forty purplish disc florets. Flowering mostly occurs between October and March and the fruit is an achene about 3 mm (0.12 in) long, the pappus bristles about 2 mm (0.079 in) long.

== Taxonomy ==
Mountain daisy was first formally described in 1874 by Ferdinand von Mueller who gave it the name Aster ballii in Fragmenta Phytographiae Australiae. In 1896, William Hemsley changed the name to Olearia ballii in the Annals of Botany. The specific epithet (ballii) honours Lieutenant Henry Lidgbird Ball who, while commanding HMS Supply in 1788, discovered and named Lord Howe Island, where the plant was subsequently collected.

== Distribution and habitat ==
Olearia ballii is endemic to Australia’s Lord Howe Island where it grows on the southern mountains and is common at altitudes above 400 m (1,300 ft).
