= Daniel Southwell =

Royal Navy officer (1764–1797)

- Born: c. 1764
- Died: 21 August 1797 (aged 32–33); Lisbon, Portugal
- Military career
- Branch: Royal Navy
- Rank: Lieutenant

Lieutenant Daniel Southwell (c. 1764 – 21 August 1797) was an officer of the Royal Navy, who as a midshipman was part of the crew of HMS Sirius when it sailed with the First Fleet to found a penal colony in Botany Bay. He kept a journal and corresponded with his mother, Jane Southwell, and uncle, the Reverend Weeden Butler. This correspondence is held in the British Museum with copies held in Mitchell Library, New South Wales.

== Early service ==
Southwell joined the navy at the age of 16 in May 1780 as a servant to the first lieutenant aboard the 90-gun HMS Ocean, which was then serving as a guard ship in Plymouth harbour and later was part of the Navy's Western Squadron off the coast of France. After six months, on 13 November 1780, he was promoted to ordinary seaman and transferred to HMS Monkey, a newly purchased 12-gun cutter under the command of Ocean's former first lieutenant James Glasford. A month later he saw his first active service when Monkey pursued and engaged with an 18-gun French privateer off Great Yarmouth.

== Australian service ==
Southwell joined the crew of HMS Sirius as a midshipman on 28 October 1786. He was promoted to master's mate on 29 September 1787 after some ill officers were discharged while the fleet was at Rio de Janeiro.

Sirius remained in the colony under the command of Captain John Hunter, for use by the Governor as needed. In October 1788 she sailed to Cape Town to get food supplies, returning to Port Jackson in May 1789, completing a circumnavigation in this voyage.

Southwell was appointed as commander of the lookout station at Sydney's South Head.

A series of letters from Southwell to his parents in England offers depictions of early colonial life and the first substantive interactions between Europeans and Australian Aborigines. The letters also reveal clashes between the colonial Governor, Captain Arthur Phillip, and his senior military officer Major Robert Ross, and Southwell's deep pessimism regarding the colony's economic and governmental prospects.

== Return to England ==
On 28 March 1791 Southwell sailed from Sydney in the Waaksamheyd with the rest of the Sirius crew. He was promoted to lieutenant on 11 February 1794. He saw active service in the early stages of the French Revolutionary Wars but was wounded in action off the Portuguese coast and died in Lisbon Hospital on 21 August 1797.

== Notes ==
=== Bibliography ===
- Bladen, F. M., ed. (1978). Historical records of New South Wales. Vol. 2. Grose and Paterson, 1793-1795. Lansdown Slattery & Co. ISBN 0868330035.
- Winfield, Rif (2007). British Warships in the Age of Sail 1714-1792. Seaforth Publishing. ISBN 9781844157006.
- Horton, Allan (1967). Southwell, Daniel (1764–1797). Australian Dictionary of Biography, National Centre of Biography, Australian National University.

=== External links ===
- Journal and Letters of Daniel Southwell at Project Gutenberg Australia
