= Frederick Meredith (settler) =

First Fleet sailor and early free settler in New South Wales

Frederick Meredith (5 October 1763 – 23 June 1836) was a sailor of the First Fleet and an early free settler in New South Wales. He arrived in Australia in 1788 aboard the transport Scarborough, later served as an able seaman and baker on HMS Sirius, and subsequently returned to the colony as a settler, becoming a landholder, baker, and colonial constable.

== Early life ==
Frederick Meredith was born on 5 October 1763 in England. His birthplace is variously recorded as Durham, Ludlow, Shropshire, and as Denham, near Harefield, which he nominated when signing on to HMS Sirius. He was literate and appears to have had experience relevant to agriculture and baking prior to his naval service.

== First Fleet service ==
Meredith joined the transport Scarborough as steward to Captain John Marshall and sailed with the First Fleet from Portsmouth on 13 May 1787, arriving at Sydney Cove in January 1788. On 2 May 1788 he transferred to HMS Sirius as an able seaman and baker.

In February 1788 Meredith was brought before the colonial magistrates for supplying rum to a convict, contrary to Governor Arthur Phillip’s regulations. He was sentenced to 100 lashes, later reduced to 50 following petitions from Captain Marshall and others.

== Garden Island ==
Later in 1788, Meredith, as a member of the crew of HMS Sirius, was assigned to assist with the establishment of gardens on Garden Island, then known as Sirius Garden Island. A rock carving bearing the inscription “FM 1788”, attributed to Meredith, remains visible on the island and has been identified as a notable early colonial artefact.

As a crew member of HMS Sirius, Meredith took part in several supply voyages, including the ship’s hazardous expedition to Cape Town in 1788–1789 to obtain provisions for the struggling colony. Sirius returned to Sydney on 20 February 1789. The vessel was wrecked at Norfolk Island on 19 March 1790.

Following the wreck, Meredith returned to Sydney and later departed for England aboard the Dutch ship Waaksamheid, leaving in March 1791 and arriving in April 1792.

== Return as a settler ==
Meredith returned to New South Wales as a free settler aboard the Bellona, arriving in Sydney in January 1793. Meredith received an early land grant at Liberty Plains (Homebush), comprising approximately 50–60 acres. He later received additional grants, including land near Rhodes and, in 1809, 120 acres at Punchbowl on the Georges River.

From at least this period, Meredith operated as a baker.

== Family ==
Meredith had several children with different partners during the early colonial period. He had a daughter, Charlotte, with Mary Allen in 1790; a daughter with Mary Martin in 1790; a daughter with Ann Case in 1793; and a daughter with Mary Kirk in 1794.

He later formed a long-term relationship with Sarah Mason, with whom he had several children. Meredith and Sarah Mason married on 17 January 1801. Sarah Mason died on 1 August 1832 and was buried at St Luke's Church, Liverpool.

On 19 February 1833 Meredith married Ann Day, a widow.

== Colonial service ==
In 1802 Meredith served as a private in the Sydney Loyal Association, a militia organisation established to assist colonial authorities during a period of unrest. He was active during the era that included the Castle Hill (Vinegar Hill) uprising of 1804.

In December 1810 Meredith was appointed to Governor Lachlan Macquarie’s constabulary and later became Chief Constable in the Liverpool district. Contemporary reports in the Sydney Gazette record his involvement in defending settler properties and in the apprehension of bushrangers. He held the position of Chief Constable until his retirement.

== Later life and death ==
In 1831 Meredith was granted a further 60 acres of land on the Liverpool Road at Bankstown.

Frederick Meredith died on 23 June 1836, aged 73. He was buried at St Luke’s Church, Liverpool, New South Wales.
