= Valentine Collard =

Rear-Admiral Valentine Collard
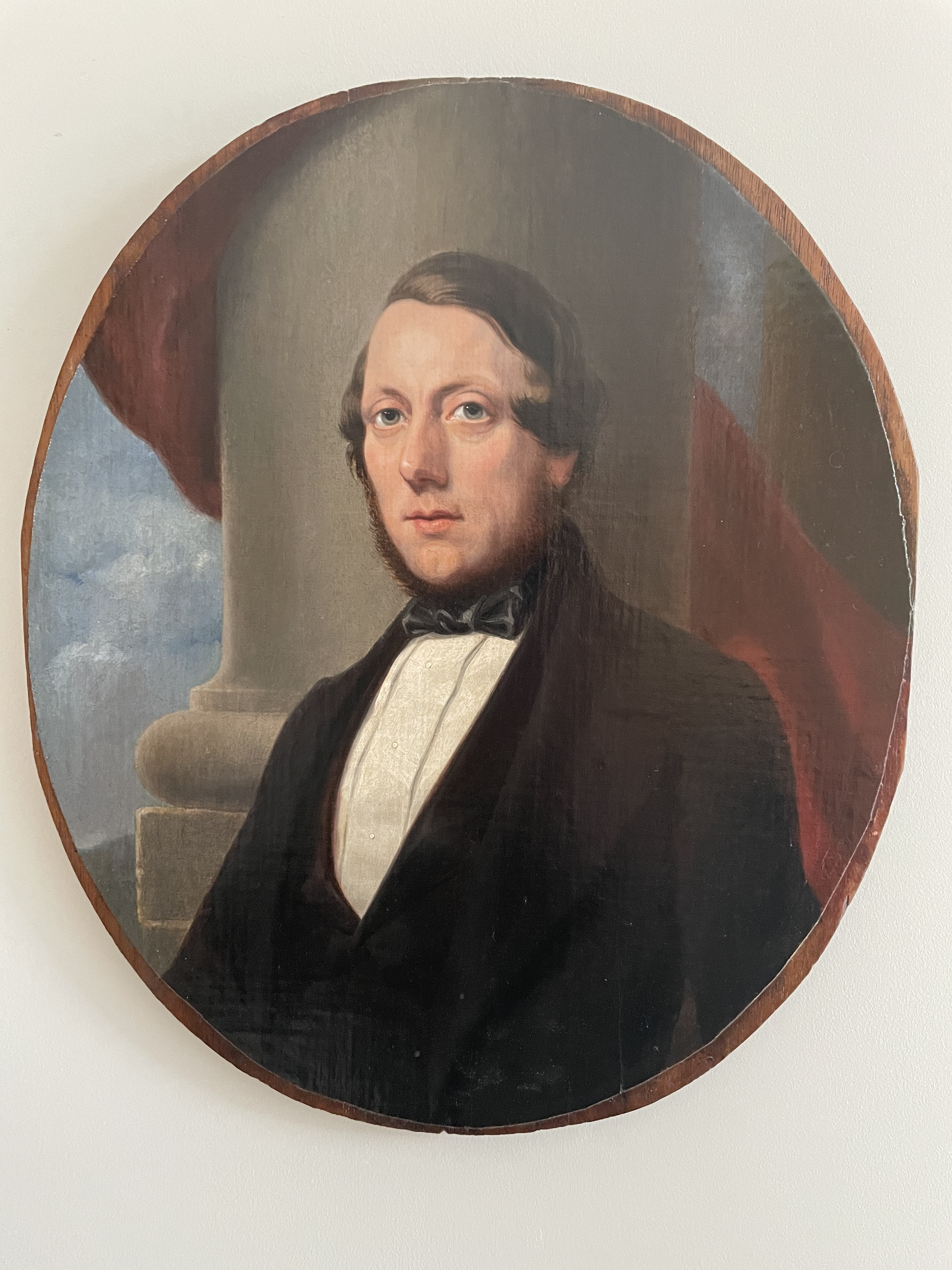
- Born: c. 1770
- Died: 18 March 1846; Teddington, Middlesex
- Military career
- Allegiance: United Kingdom
- Branch: Royal Navy
- Service years: 1783–1846
- Rank: Rear-Admiral
- Nickname: "the animated life-boat"
- Conflicts: French Revolutionary Wars; Siege of Toulon; Battle of Cape St Vincent; Siege of Genoa; Napoleonic Wars; Battle of Copenhagen

Rear-Admiral Valentine Collard (c. 1770 – 18 March 1846) was a Royal Navy officer of the early nineteenth century who is best known for his service in the French Revolutionary and Napoleonic Wars. Born into a naval family, Collard served at numerous engagements of the wars, including the Siege of Toulon, operations against Corsica, the Battle of Cape St Vincent, the Siege of Genoa, the Battle of Copenhagen and numerous smaller actions off the Netherlands, Egypt and in the Baltic Sea. His last active service came in 1810, after which he retired to Teddington in Middlesex. In his later years he suffered severe ill-health and the loss of his first and second wives, leading him to commit suicide.

== Life ==
Valentine Collard was born in approximately 1770 into a naval family: two of his uncles were Admiral Sampson Edwards and Captain Valentine Edwards who was killed in a shipwreck in 1794. Pursuing a naval career, Collard first appears in the records as a midshipman at the end of the American War of Independence in 1783. For four years he was under his uncle Captain Valentine Edwards in HMS Shark off Scotland before taking a position on HMS Champion with Sampson Edwards. He later served in HMS Iphigenia, and at the outbreak of the French Revolutionary Wars in 1793 was transferred to HMS St George in the Mediterranean. There he took part in the Siege of Toulon engaging French Republican artillery along the siege lines, and in October 1793 was with the force that captured a French ship lying in Genoa harbour at the action of 5 October 1793.

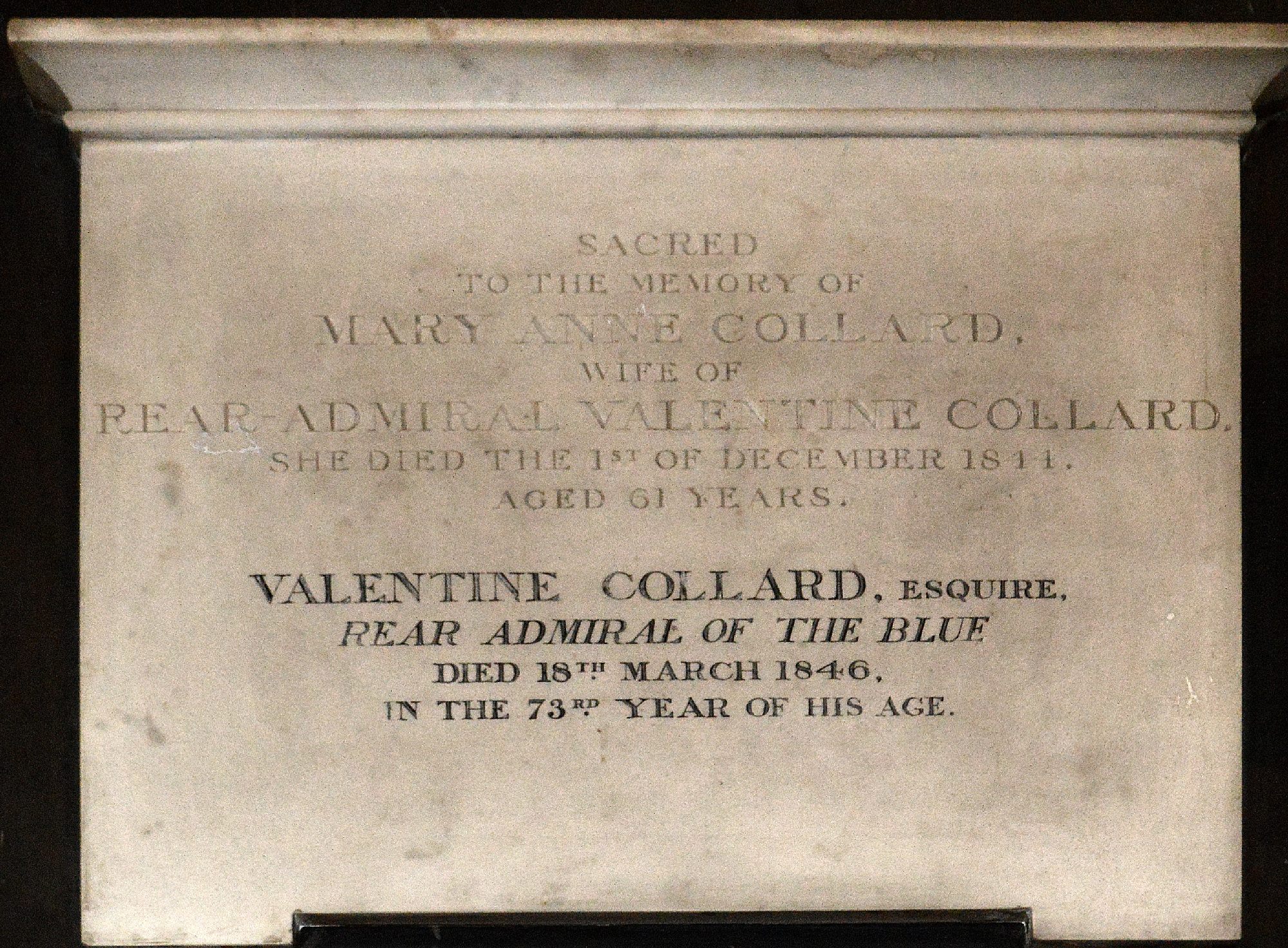
Monument for Valentine Collard at St Mary's church, Teddington

In November 1793, while stationed in Sardinia, Collard was promoted to lieutenant and briefly joined HMS Tartar before receiving his own small command, the schooner Petite Boston, which participated in the Siege of Bastia and Siege of Calvi on Corsica. He then spent two years on HMS Eclair before joining HMS Britannia as senior lieutenant. Britannia was subsequently engaged at the Battle of Cape St Vincent in February 1797 and Collard was promoted to commander as a reward. He was briefly in command of HMS Fortune, which was wrecked off Portugal before joining the small frigate HMS Vestal and participating in the Siege of Genoa and the blockade of Egypt, capturing a storeship in 1801. The frigate was paid off in 1802 at the Peace of Amiens and Collard entered the reserve.

In 1804 Collard was returned to service and joined the fleet under Lord Keith as captain of the brig HMS Railleur and then the explosion vessel HMS St Vincent. He served off the Dutch coast and captured a number of small vessels and military equipment in April 1805. He then commanded a squadron of armed vessels on the Weser River as part of the defence of Hanover. In 1806 and 1807 he was placed in command of squadrons of small warships that escorted merchant shipping through the Baltic Sea, joining with the fleet under James Gambier that fought in the Battle of Copenhagen. He then served in a number of temporary captaincies, including postings to HMS Majestic, HMS Gibraltar and HMS Dreadnought before he retired from the sea in 1810.

Collard retired to Teddington in Middlesex with his first wife, who died in 1821. He remarried in 1823 to May Ann Kempster, who died in 1844. The loss of his second wife drove him into depression, during which he suffered from apoplexy and eventually committed suicide in March 1846 aged 76. Collard had remained in the Navy after and continued gaining seniority, eventually becoming a rear-admiral in 1841. Throughout his career, Collard was a popular officer, who gained the nickname "the animated life-boat" after rescuing men who fell overboard from his ship on two separate occasions.
