= Admiral Edwards =

Admiral Edwards may refer to:

- Edward Edwards (Royal Navy officer) (1927–2014), British Royal Navy admiral
- Phillip Edwards (Royal Navy officer) (1927–2014), British Royal Navy rear admiral
- Ralph Edwards (Royal Navy officer) (1901–1963), British Royal Navy admiral
- Richard Edwards (Royal Navy officer, died 1773), British Royal Navy rear admiral
- Richard Edwards (Royal Navy officer, died 1795) (c. 1715–1795), British Royal Navy admiral
- Richard S. Edwards (1885–1956), U.S. Navy admiral
- Ronald A. Edwards (1923–2014), South African Navy vice admiral
- Sampson Edwards (c. 1744–1840), British Royal Navy admiral
