= David Blackburn (Royal Navy officer) =

Royal Navy officer (1753–1795)

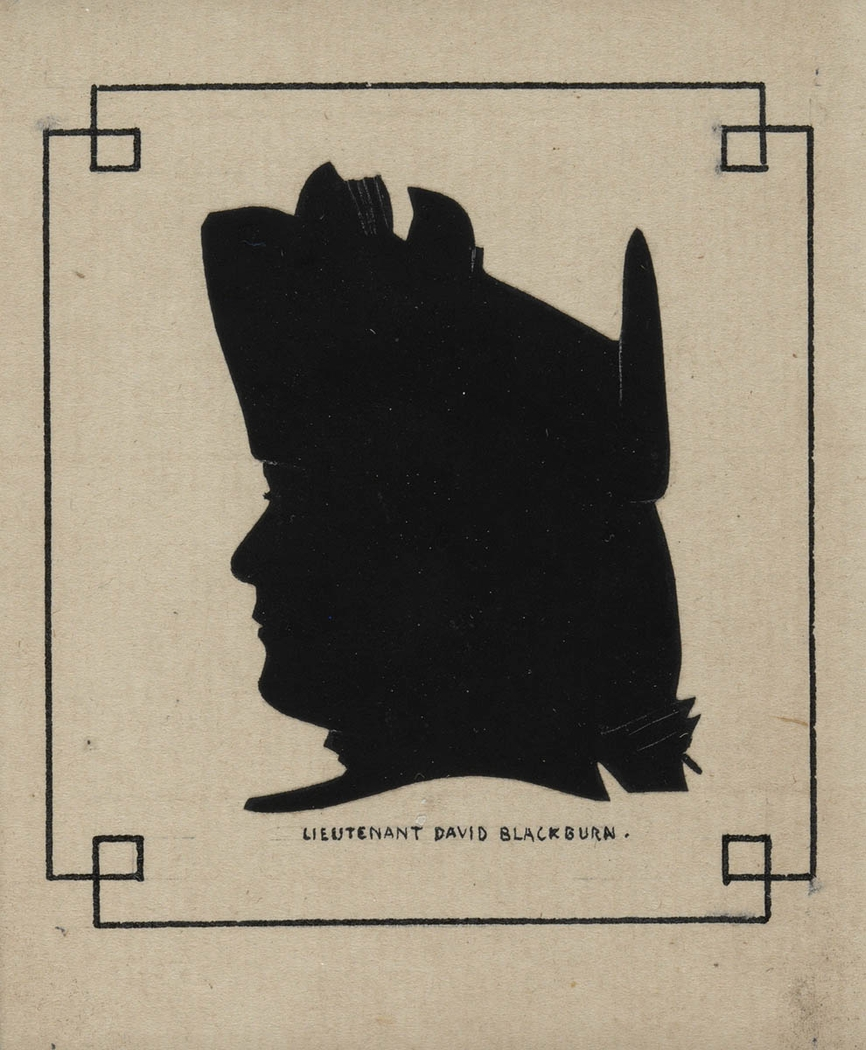
- Silhouette of David Blackburn
- Born: 1 January 1753; Newbury, Berkshire, England
- Died: 10 January 1795 (aged 42); Haslar Naval Hospital, Gosport, Hampshire, England
- Occupation: Royal Navy officer
- Known for: Master of HMS Supply in the First Fleet to New South Wales

Lieutenant David Blackburn (1 January 1753 – 10 January 1795) was a Royal Navy officer. He was Commander of the ship HMS Sirius on its voyage to Norfolk Island in March 1790 having been Master of HMS Supply in the First Fleet that established the British settlement in New South Wales, Australia in 1788.

== Early life and family ==
Blackburn was born on 1 January 1753 at Newbury, Berkshire, England. He was eldest son of Rev. John Blackburn (d.1762) and his wife Elizabeth (née Martineau, b.1725). His family moved to Norwich after John's death in 1762. Also living at Norwich was his aunt, Dame Sarah Martineau (1725–1800) who wrote comforting letters to family members, including her sister-in-law and niece – David's mother and sister respectively – concerning her nephew's well-being and death. These letters are held at the State Library of New South Wales and the National Library of Australia.

== Career ==
He joined the Royal Navy on 5 May 1779, serving as a midshipman in HMS Victory. He was serving as master of HMS Flora in the West Indies in 1785.

== First Fleet and related correspondence ==
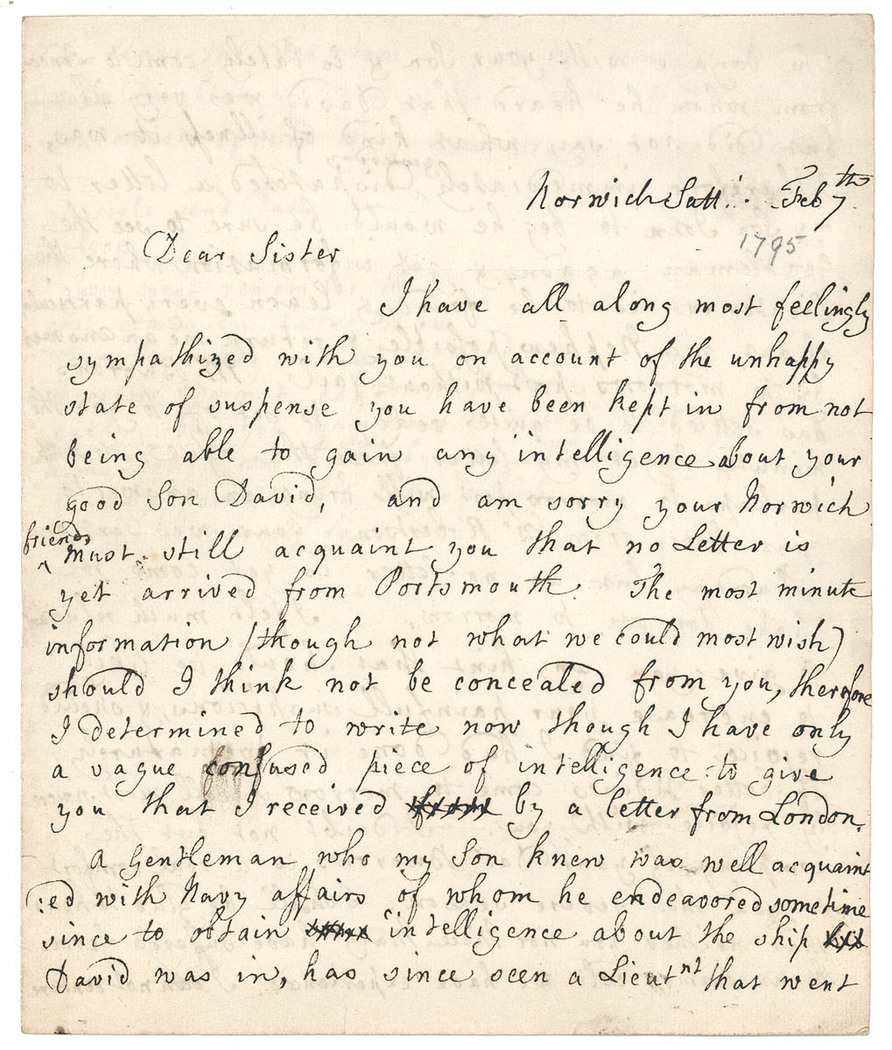
Letter from David's aunt, Sarah Martineau, to his mother

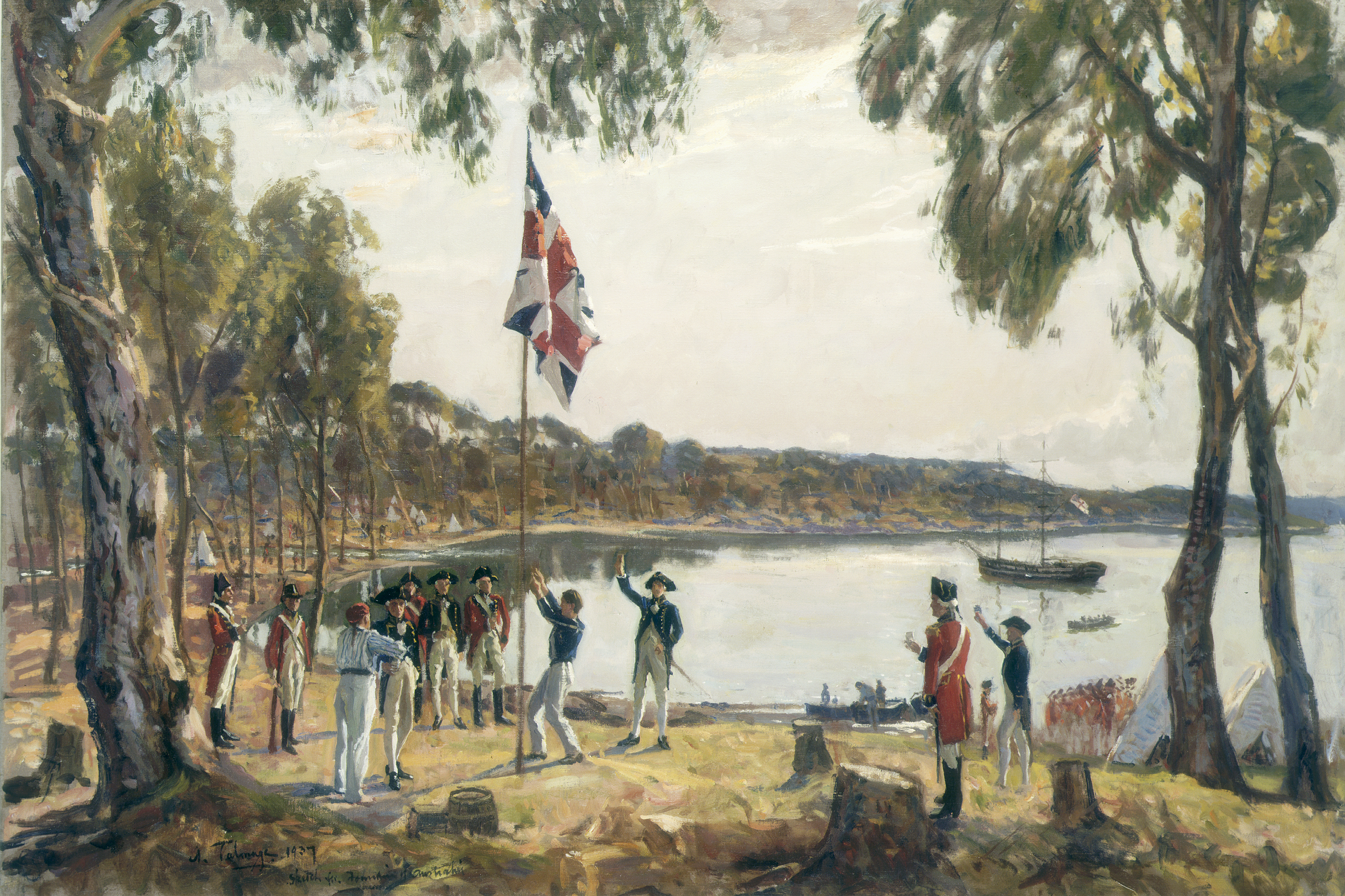
Blackburn is seen fifth from left in Algernon Talmage's sketch for his 1937 painting "The Founding of Australia"

In April 1787 he was appointed master of Supply, part of the First Fleet that established British settlement in New South Wales. During this time he wrote a series of letters to family members, including his sister Margaret (b. 1762) and friends, many of which are still extant. These letters describe the events of the voyage and the early days of settlement, including Blackburn's participation in the expedition to Norfolk Island to establish a settlement there in February 1788. Blackburn's letters record the change in his feelings towards the voyage. Initially reluctant to join the Fleet, shortly before the Fleet left he told his sister in a letter that "my dislike to the voyage begins gradually to wear off".

Supply was part of the advance party of ships which arrived in Botany Bay on 18 January. Governor Arthur Phillip's letters to Blackburn are held at the National Library of Australia. Blackburn joined Phillip's expedition in search of a better location for the settlement, and describes Sydney Harbour as "excellent and extensive".

== Death ==
He died of illness on 10 January 1795 at Royal Hospital Haslar, Gosport, Hampshire, England.

== Legacy ==
Blackburn's Club or Whip is the only wooden object which survives from the First Fleet. Its cat o' nine tails are attached to an Aboriginal truncheon. It is thought not to have been used on Aboriginal Australians. The whip, along with his papers and letters, remained as revered, precious objects of a celebrated seafarer in the Blackburn family's possession until the 1990s when they went under the hammer at Christie's, London where a South Australian dealer purchased the club/whip (along with a small cosh which Blackburn probably carried for self-defence). The South Australian Museum eventually purchased both.

== See also ==
- Journals of the First Fleet
