= Frederick Meredith =

Frederick Meredith may refer to:

- Frederick Edmund Meredith (1862–1941), Canadian lawyer and businessman
- Frederick William Meredith (1895–1980), Irish engineer, communist and Soviet agent
- Frederick Meredith (settler) (1763–1836), First Fleet sailor and settler in New South Wales
