= Henry Lidgbird Ball =

Royal Navy officer (1756–1818)

Rear-Admiral Henry Lidgbird Ball
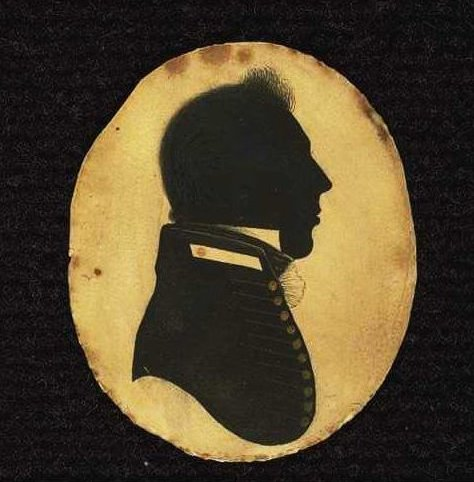
- Silhouette of Henry Lidgbird Ball
- Born: 7 December 1756 (Note: Date of christening, not birth); Woodchurch, Cheshire, England
- Died: 22 October 1818 (aged 61); Mitcham, Surrey, England
- Spouses: Charlotte Foster (m. 1802; died 1803) Anne Georgiana Henrietta Johnston (m. 1810)
- Children: Anne Maria Partridge Ball (b. 1789)
- Military career
- Branch: Royal Navy
- Rank: Rear-Admiral of the Blue
- Commands: HMS Christian VII 1812–1813; HMS Gibraltar 1809–1810; HMS Zealand 1805–1807; HMS Trident 1801; HMS Daedalus 1797–1801; HMS Ariadne 1796–1797; HMS Flora 1795; HMS Fury 1793–1795; HMAT Supply 1787–1792; HMS Seaflower 1783–1786
- Conflicts: French Revolutionary Wars; Napoleonic Wars

Rear-Admiral of the Blue Henry Lidgbird Ball (7 December 1756 – 22 October 1818) was a Royal Navy officer who served in the French Revolutionary and Napoleonic Wars. While Ball was best known as the commander of the First Fleet's HMAT Supply (1759), he was also notable for the exploration and the establishment of colonies around what is now Australia and New Zealand. Specifically, Ball explored the area around Port Jackson and Broken Bay, helped establish the Norfolk Island penal settlement, and discovered and named Lord Howe Island.

Ball joined the Royal Navy and was a crewman of various ships, before being commissioned as a lieutenant on 23 April 1778. Ball's first command was HMS Seaflower off the Northern Irish coast from 1783 until 1786. In October 1787 Ball was appointed to command HMAT Supply and to join Captain Arthur Phillip's expedition to establish a penal colony in New South Wales. The expedition departed England on 13 May 1787, and Supply was accompanied by 10 other ships. Of all the ships in the fleet, Supply reached Botany Bay first, on 18 January 1788. Supply would remain in the colony under the overall command of Governor Phillip, and transport persons to establish a secondary settlement on Norfolk Island after which Supply was mainly used to transport supplies and people between the two settlements.

Ball returned to England in 1791 due to declining health. Upon improved health, Ball returned to the Navy in December 1793, and served in the Downs. In March 1796, Ball was given command of HMS Ariadne and joined Rear-Admiral Hugh Cloberry Christian's convoy to capture Dutch and French colonies in the Caribbean. In March 1797, Ball was appointed to HMS Daedalus and was stationed off South Africa where she was involved in the capture of six vessels and the action of 9 February 1799. Daedalus sailed for the East Indies Station on 9 July 1799, where she was involved in operations in the Red Sea. Ball returned to England in March 1802.

Ball was commander of HMS Gibraltar at the Battle of the Basque Roads, and was called as a witness at the Court-martial of James, Lord Gambier, regarding those events. Ball enjoyed a few more commands before his semi-retirement in December 1813. Ball received the title Rear-Admiral of the Blue on 4 June 1814. Ball spent his retirement in Surrey, England until his death on 22 October 1818.

== Early life ==
Henry Lidgbird Ball was born in 1756 at Birkenhead, Cheshire, England, to George Ball and his wife, Lucy Stringer. Henry was baptised on 7 December 1756 in Holy Cross Church, Woodchurch, Cheshire.

Ball joined the Royal Navy at about 15 years of age and served on various ships: HMS Venus, HMS Ramillies, HMS Raven, and HMS Lark. On 23 April 1778 Ball was commissioned a lieutenant. From March 1783 until April 1786, he commanded the cutter HMS Seaflower sailing off the northern coast of Ireland.

== Colonial service ==
In October 1787, Ball was placed in command of the armed tender HMAT Supply as part of the naval escort for the ships of the First Fleet, which was a fleet of ships that transported convicts to start the first European colony in Australia. Supply's armament was increased in 1786 from its original four small 3-pounder cannons and six 1/2-pounder swivel guns to include four additional twelve-pounder carronades. The crew was also increased to a total of 55. Additionally, a detachment of 16 marines from the New South Wales Marine Corps, under the command of Lieutenant William Dawes, was embarked. Supply as part of the First Fleet had orders to create a penal colony in Botany Bay, New South Wales.

Supply sailed with the First Fleet from Spithead, Portsmouth, on 13 May 1787 under the overall command of Commodore Arthur Phillip. On 3 June 1787, the fleet anchored at Santa Cruz de Tenerife, Spain. On 10 June they began their voyage across the Atlantic to Rio de Janeiro, Brazil, taking advantage of favourable trade winds and ocean currents. The fleet reached Rio on 5 August and remained there for a month while restocking supplies. The fleet departed Rio on 4 September to run before the westerlies, reaching Table Bay (the last port of call before Botany Bay) in South Africa on 13 October. On 25 November, Phillip transferred from HMS Sirius to the faster Supply, and with the fleet's faster ships raced ahead to prepare for the arrival of the rest of his command. However, this "flying squadron" reached Botany Bay only hours before the slower members, so no preparatory work was done. Supply reached Botany Bay on 18 January 1788, with the three fastest transports in the advance group arrived on 19 January and the slower ships, including Sirius, arriving on 20 January. After an exploration of the Botany Bay area, it was decided that the area was unsuitable for settlement and the fleet moved to Port Jackson, arriving at a cove Phillip named Sydney Cove on 26 January.

On 14 February Ball on Supply sailed with Lieutenant Philip Gidley King, who was to establish a subordinate settlement on Norfolk Island. Ball discovered navigational and physical difficulties in approaching the island – challenges which were to affect future settlement there – but he managed to bring both people and supplies ashore by 6 March. On the return voyage, Ball explored a small, previously sighted island which he named Lord Howe's Island after Richard Howe, 1st Earl Howe; he also named Mount Lidgbird and Ball's Pyramid after himself. Ball's sketches, notes and descriptions of the landscape and fauna of Lord Howe Island and Ball's Pyramid were published in 1789 as a chapter in Phillip's book The Voyage of Governor Phillip to Botany Bay.

On 6 May Supply left Port Jackson for Lord Howe Island to capture turtles to supplement the food stores of the settlement, but discovered that the turtles were only present on the island in the summer. Phillip decided on an expedition to capture a native with the goal of learning their language and customs, and on 31 December, Ball and marine Lieutenant George Johnston took two boats to Manly Cove where they captured Arabanoo. Supply made multiple voyages between the two settlements, Port Jackson and Norfolk Island, transferring men and supplies between them. She was also used to explore the waters and environs around the colonies.

On 5 March 1790 the Sirius and Supply left Sydney Cove to transport 300 convicts and marines to Norfolk Island, arriving on 13 March. Bad weather precluded landing personnel and provisions near the settlement, so the marines and some convicts were landed at Cascade Bay on the north-east coast. Here they each were required to jump, one at a time, from boat to a rock, which was only possible when the tide was half out. On 19 March the weather cleared and Ball and Captain John Hunter of Sirius started to unload the remaining convicts and provisions. Ball noticed the current was pushing the ships toward the sunken rocks and signalled to Hunter before manoeuvring Supply away from the danger. Even though the Sirius was further from the rocks than Supply, Hunter was unable to save his ship from foundering. Supply, with assistance of the men on shore, was able to rescue every person from the sinking Sirius.

Sirius was supposed to continue on to Canton (present-day Guangzhou), to pick up supplies, but with its loss at Norfolk Island, Supply sailed on 17 April to procure provisions from Batavia, Dutch East Indies, carrying Philip Gidley King, who was to continue on to England with the Governor's dispatches. Ball returned to Port Jackson on 18 October, having chartered the Waaksamheyd to bring the rest of supplies, which arrived 17 December. Ball became very ill with a fever which began while he was in Batavia. In March 1791 Ball sought leave to return to England both to recover his health and to attend to family affairs. Sailing on 25 November via Cape Horn, he arrived at Plymouth 21 April 1792 after completing a circumnavigation with Supply.

Ball continued to be interested in the colonies of New South Wales; in 1803 James Grant mentioned Ball as having encouraged him to publish his book Narrative of a Voyage of Discovery, about his explorations of Bass Strait in HMS Lady Nelson. In January 1808 it was noted that Ball applied for the governorship of New South Wales, but the request was turned down as no change in governor was intended at that point.

== Further naval career ==
Ball was promoted to commander on 28 April 1792. With his health recovered, he returned to duty in December 1793 and was assigned command of the sloop HMS Fury, joining Rear-Admiral John MacBride's squadron in the Downs. In December 1794 Ball was given command of 36-gun fifth rate frigate HMS Flora. Ball was promoted to captain on 9 July 1795. In March 1796, Ball was given command of 24-gun sixth rate HMS Ariadne, and joined Rear-Admiral Hugh Cloberry Christian's convoy to the Leeward Islands Station, with the intention of capturing the Dutch and French colonies in the Caribbean. Christian's convoy arrived in Barbados on 21 April. With Lieutenant-General Sir Ralph Abercromby's forces, Christian sailed on 26 April, to invade St Lucia, which surrendered 25 May.

In March 1797 Ball was appointed to the 32-gun fifth rate frigate HMS Daedalus, and on 14 July Daedalus, with HMS Leopard and HMS Orestes, sailed from England for the Cape of Good Hope. While stationed in South Africa between the months August 1797 and February 1798, Deadalus and HMS Hornet were involved in the capture of six vessels: American vessels Rebecca and President, slavers Quaker and Ocean, French schooner Prosperité and an armed ship Bell. Daedalus was involved in an action off of South Africa – just after day-break on 9 February 1799, unknown sails were seen on the horizon. These were the French frigate Prudente and its prize, an American ship Canton. The two ships split up and Daedalus followed the larger Prudente. Just after 12:00 Prudente, unable to evade her pursuer, turned to fire a broadside at the Daedalus. At around 25 minutes past 12:00 Daedalus opened fire, with the ships now side by side they exchanged cannon fire until the badly battered French ship surrendered after almost an hour. The Daedalus lost two men, and 12 were wounded in the engagement; Prudente suffered 27 killed and 22 wounded before returning to the Cape of Good Hope, where Prudente's damage was deemed too expensive to repair and she was scrapped.

On 9 July, Daedalus sailed for the East Indies Station, joining the fleet of Rear-Admiral Peter Rainier. On 14 August Daedalus and HMS Fox, which was on operations in the Red Sea, received information from trading vessels that Frenchmen were stationed at the town of Kosseir. Sailing to investigate, they found that the French colours were flying over the fort. The two frigates then opened fire on the fort and town, continuing the occasional cannon fire through the night and over the next few days. Boats were sent in on two separate attempts to land men and cannons to take the town, but the French defence forced their retreat, with one man dead and a cannon lost in the surf. Daedalus and Fox retreated on the afternoon of 16 August. Between 23 August 1800 and 31 March 1801, Daedalus was part of Rainier's fleet that captured five armed Dutch vessels and destroyed another 22. One of these captured vessels Ball ordered manned and armed, which he named HMS Admiral Rainier. With the death of Captain John Turnor in January 1801, Ball took command of the 64-gun third rate ship of the line HMS Trident.

With the Peace of Amiens, 25 March 1802, Ball returned to Britain. With the death of Captain Adrian Renou in January 1805, Ball was appointed flag captain to Rear-Admiral Bartholomew Rowley in the 64-gun third rate ship of the line HMS Zealand as a guardship at the Nore. On 6 April 1806, Zealand in company with HMS Terror, HMS Lion and HMS Railleur, captured four Prussian vessels. With Rowley appointed in April 1807 as Commander-in-Chief, the Downs, Ball was moved to the navy's list of reserve officers.

Ball was awarded a silver medal from the Society for the Encouragement of Arts, Manufactures and Commerce (now known as the Royal Society of Arts), in 1807. It was awarded for a design for the improvement of the durability of anchors, as well as a way of raising them, that he believed would reduce accidents to the crew and ships.

In early April 1809 Ball was commander of the 80-gun third rate ship of the line HMS Gibraltar. Gibraltar joined the fleet of Admiral Lord Gambier in blockading the French at Battle of the Basque Roads. Crew from Gibraltar helped to man the fireships of Captain Lord Cochrane's attack on 11 April, with Lieutenant John Cookesley injured and Master's mate John Conyers killed. Gibraltar was part of Gambier's fleet that tried to capture or destroy the French vessels, until the battle came to an end on 29 April. On 3 August, Ball was called as a witness on the eighth day of the Court-martial of James, Lord Gambier which assessed whether Gambier had failed to support Cochrane at the Battle of Basque Roads. Ball testified in Gambier's favour, with the verdict clearing Gambier of all charges on 4 August.

In April 1812 Ball became flag captain to Rear-Admiral Philip Charles Durham in the 80-gun HMS Christian VII off Texel, until December 1813, with Christian VII being removed from active service. Ball then went on half-pay in semi-retirement. On 4 June 1814 Ball was promoted to flag rank as rear-admiral of the blue.

== Personal life ==
Ball married twice. His first marriage was on 17 June 1802, to Charlotte Forster, who died a year later in 1803. On 19 July 1810, Ball was married for a second time to Anne Georgianna Henrietta Johnston, who was 31 years his junior. She survived him and died in 1864. Neither marriage produced any children.

Ball had one daughter, Anne Maria, born 1789 on Norfolk Island to Sarah Partridge (also known as Sarah Roberts), a convict sentenced to 7 years' transportation, for shoplifting on 14 January 1784, transported with the First Fleet in the Lady Penrhyn. Anne Maria was baptised on 22 August 1789 at Sydney. As Partridge's sentence had expired by the time Ball returned to England, it's believed that Partridge and his daughter returned with him on Supply. Anne Maria married Joseph Freeman Rattenbury, of Gray's Inn, on 24 July 1810. Ball's sister Mary made "my niece 'Ann Maria'" her heir in 1820.

== Death and legacy ==
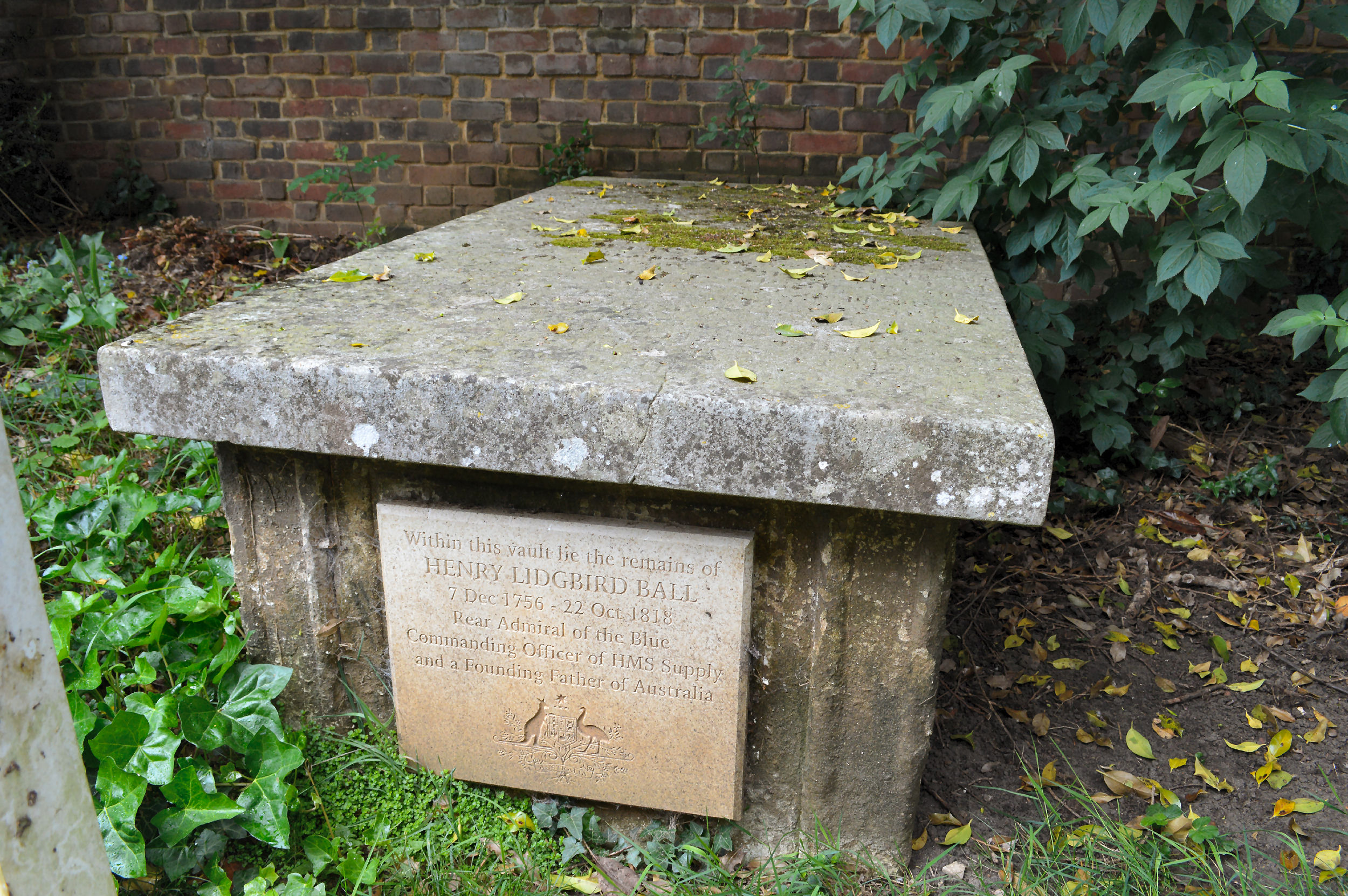
Tomb at Petersham in Richmond, London.

Ball retired to Mitcham (then in Surrey and now in Greater London) where he died on 22 October 1818. He was buried in the churchyard at St Peter's Church, Petersham, in the family vault of his second wife. A plaque commemorating Ball was added to the Johnston tomb on 20 October 2013 at a service attended by the Australian High Commissioner to the United Kingdom. Ball's Pyramid and Mount Lidgbird on Lord Howe Island, Ball Bay, Norfolk Island, and Balls Head on Sydney Harbour are all named after him.
