= Balls Head Reserve =

Nature reserve in Sydney, Australia

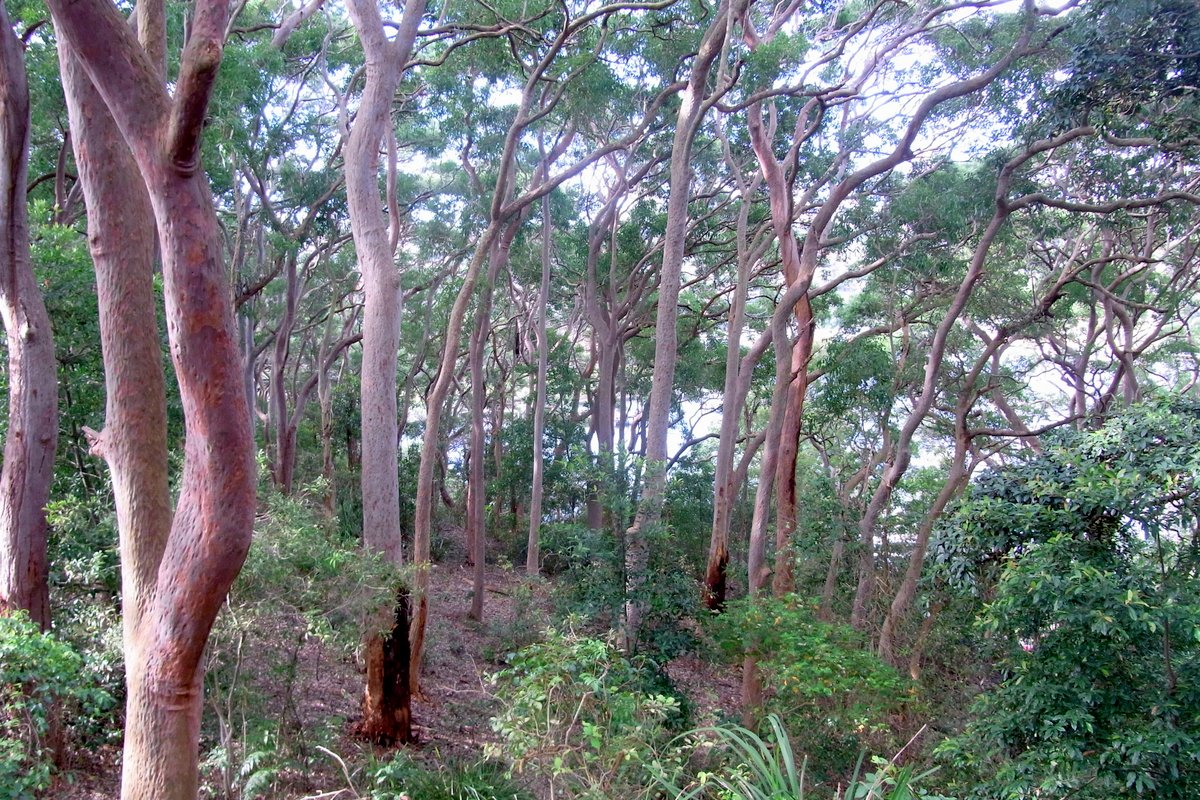
- Sydney red gum at Balls Head Reserve

- Location within inner Sydney
- Interactive map of Balls Head Reserve
- Type: Nature reserve
- Location: Balls Head Drive, Waverton, North Sydney Council, New South Wales, Australia
- Nearest city: Sydney
- Coordinates: 33°50.8′S 151°11.7′E
- Designated: 1926 by Premier Jack Lang
- Etymology: Henry Lidgbird Ball
- Manager: North Sydney Council

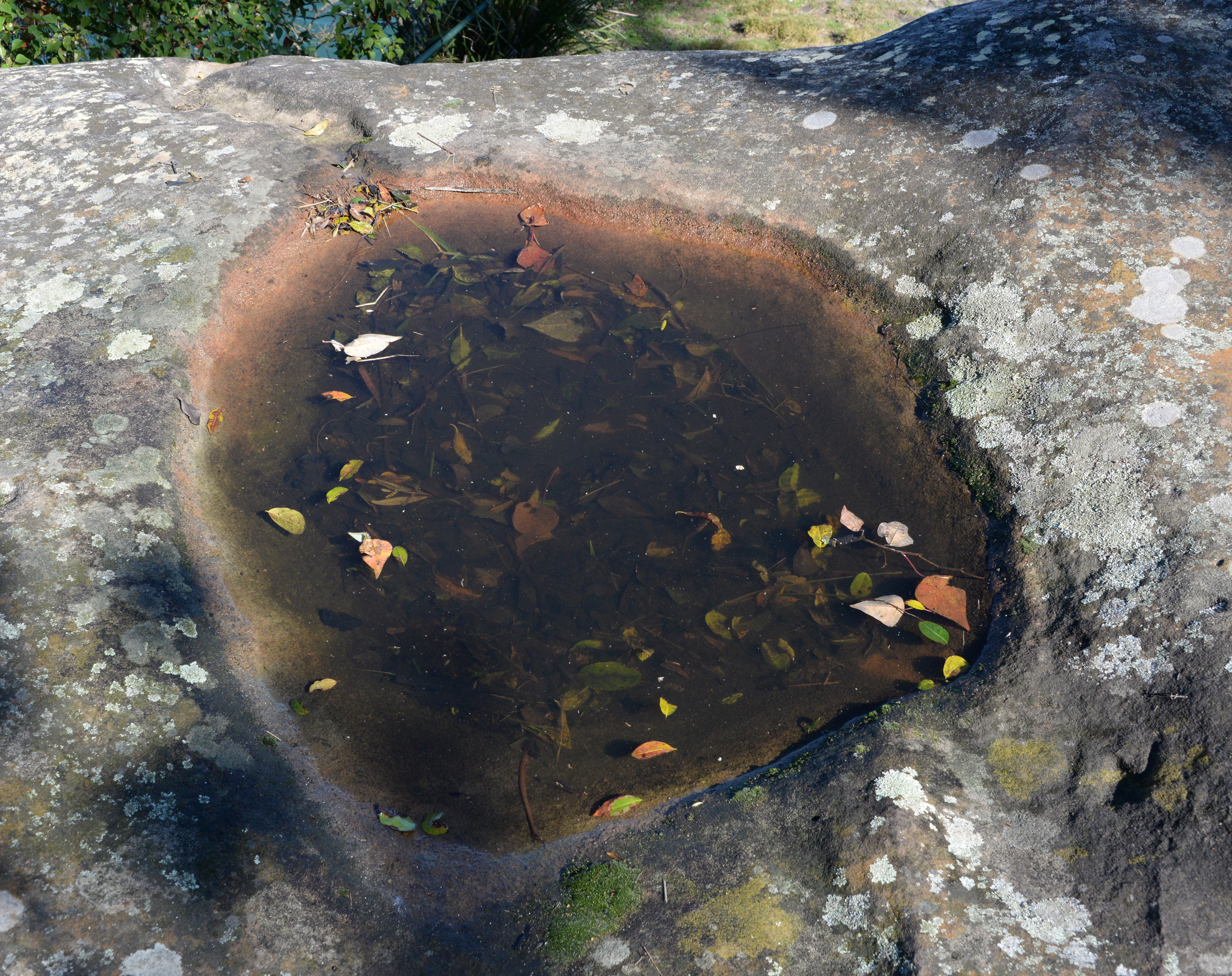
Waterhole at Balls Head, probably created or enlarged by Aboriginal people

The Balls Head Reserve is a forested headland nature reserve situated on Balls Head in Sydney. The headland is in Port Jackson, 1.5 kilometres (0.93 mi) west of the Sydney Harbour Bridge, between Berrys Bay to the east and Balls Head Bay to the west. It is named after Lieutenant Henry Lidgbird Ball, a Royal Naval officer who commanded HMS Supply on the First Fleet. The park is accessed via Balls Head Drive, Waverton, New South Wales, Australia.

== History ==
=== Indigenous history ===
The original inhabitants were the Cammeraygal people. Evidence of their occupation includes art sites, middens and a spectacular petroglyph of a marine creature. An Aboriginal burial site within a rock shelter was documented by Sandra Bowdler, an archaeologist from the Australian Museum in 1964. Until 1916, the Balls Head area was frequented by the local Aboriginal community and sites including middens, art sites and rock engravings remain today. The Aboriginal name for Balls Head is Yerroulbine.

=== European history ===
Balls Head was the original foreshore land included in the large Wollstonecraft Estate. In 1912 the Australian Army claimed the land and a Quarantine Depot was established in Berrys Bay to service the boats operating to and from the Quarantine station at North Head. Strong public protests in the early part of the 20th century resulted in Balls Head becoming public parkland (rather than being used for commercial or residential purposes as was mooted) in 1926.

Balls Head was celebrated in two poems by Henry Lawson. The second of these, 'The Sacrifice of Balls Head' protested against plans to build a coal bunkering depot there in 1916. It stands as an early articulation of conservationist sentiment. A Coal Loader was built by 1920; in 2007, this facility was re-opened as the Coal Loader Centre for Sustainability, a hub for North Sydney Council environmental and sustainability programs.

The area was proclaimed as a public reserve by Premier Jack Lang in 1926. By then much of the forest that Lawson had described was gone. A Beautification Committee was established by 1931 led by conservationist Walter Froggatt. Native trees were reintroduced to the headland throughout the decade. Many of these were sourced from the Royal Botanic Gardens, Sydney. A stone tablet acknowledging Froggatt's work was unveiled in 1938. It can still be seen near the car park at the southern end of the reserve.

The reserve is now maintained by North Sydney Council and contains a well-preserved natural bushland area, one of the closest to the city of Sydney. Plants include the Sydney red gum, Port Jackson cypress, blueberry ash and Port Jackson fig. Many birds are found here, as are reptiles, flying foxes, microbats and marsupial mammals.

It is a popular picnic and bushwalking site, with views of the city skyline and harbour.

== Reserve features ==
- Several bush walking tracks, including one suitable for wheelchairs
- Accessible toilets, picnic tables, seats and electric barbecues
- Numerous plaques and depression era elements including remnants of paths, steps and railings dot the reserve.
- Aboriginal waterholes and grinding grooves
- Foreshore caves and chambers cut by squatters in the 1930s.

== See also ==
- Protected areas of New South Wales
- Ball's Head Coal Loader
