= George Bouchier Worgan =

English naval surgeon (1757–1838)

George Bouchier Worgan (May 1757 – 4 March 1838) was an English naval surgeon who accompanied the First Fleet to Australia. He made several expeditions to the Hawkesbury River and Broken Bay areas north of Sydney and spent a year on Norfolk Island after the Sirius was wrecked there. There is no evidence that George Worgan was on board the Sirius when it was wrecked off Norfolk Island on 19 March 1790. This is confirmed below where it states “but was not on board when it was wrecked in March 1790”. Worgan recorded many of the events of the first year of the colony of New South Wales. Unlike his contemporary Watkin Tench, he did not publish his account.

Worgan's surviving papers, in the form of a letter to his brother in England, are now held at the Mitchell Library in Sydney. The letter includes a journal kept for the first six months after the First Fleet's arrival in Sydney Cove. The journal was published in 1978 and in 2009.

He married Mary Lawry in 1793, after his return from Australia, and they had three sons and three daughters. Two sons eventually migrated to Australia. His death certificate says he died of apoplexy at Liskeard on 4 March 1838, but there are other accounts which suggest suicide by hanging.

== Early life and family ==
George Worgan was christened at St Andrew's Holborn (London) on 3 May 1757. He was the third child of John Worgan (1724–1790) and Sarah Worgan (née Mackelcan) and their second boy. He joined the navy at 18, qualified as surgeon's second mate in February 1778 and naval surgeon in March 1780. He served for two years in the Pilote before joining the Sirius in November 1786.

== Naval career ==
Event	Date commenced	Date ceased
Entered the navy	February 1778	ca. 1800
Qualified as surgeon's second mate	February 1778	-
Gazetted naval surgeon	March 1780	-
Served on the Pilote	ca. 1784	November 1786
Joined the Sirius	November 1786	-
Sailed to New South wales on Sirius	1787	-
Visited the Cape of Good Hope in the Sirius	1788	1789
Year on Norfolk Island after the wreck of the Sirius	19 March 1790	1791
Returned to England in the Waaksamheyd	1791	-
Retired on half-pay	ca. 1792	-

== First Fleet Voyages ==
George Worgan joined HMS Sirius as a surgeon in November 1786 and sailed on her to New South Wales in 1787. His ventures into Sydney bushland from April 1788 were prompted by an 'inclination to ramble', a continuation of a European tradition that could be undertaken in the Australian landscape. He took part in several expeditions to the Hawkesbury River and Broken Bay (1789), where the upper Nepean River was named Worgan River for him. On the Sirius he travelled to the Cape of Good Hope (1788–1789) but was not on board when it was wrecked in March 1790. He travelled with Watkin Tench to the Nepean during 1790 and took part in a punitive expedition against the natives on 13 December 1790. He stayed at Norfolk Island for a year (1790–1791) when the Sirius was wrecked there. He travelled back to England in 1791 on the Waaksamheyd.

== First Fleet Journal ==
His journal is an account of the first five months of settlement in New South Wales, attached to a letter written to George Worgan's brother Richard (written from 20 January to 11 July 1788). The first section was written on the Sirius (12 June 1788) and describes arriving at Sydney Cove, Port Jackson and his party's first encounter with Aboriginal Australians. He makes references to a "rough journal" and a fuller journal but these have not been found.

Throughout the manuscript Worgan describes the expeditions that the men of the First Fleet make. He describes the coastline of New South Wales, its flora and fauna and the activities engaged in to build the new colony. Explorations in land had been made and he tells of "Park-like Country" and a mountainous region where smoke was seen and thought to be inhabited to the west. He is concerned with water supply and the native vegetation, what might be edible and what might be used for building, he also describes stone.

In the journal Worgan is very interested in the various tribes that the First Fleet met and describes their physical attributes, behaviour, way of life and interaction with the Europeans in detail. He describes the female natives' behaviour, their appearance and the many attempts of the Europeans to give them gifts.

He describes the convicts, their behaviour, their ailments and injuries, the laws as presented to them and the punishment for their crimes. Marriage between the convicts is an issue he mentions. The female convicts particularly, are the target of his censure for their flouting of the law and spreading disease.

The journals were presented to the State Library of New South Wales in 1955 by Mrs Margot Gaye for her deceased aunt, Miss A. Batley. They are digitised and available online via the Library's catalogue.

== Musical background, Worgan's piano, and relationship to Mrs Elizabeth MacArthur ==
George Worgan came from a well-known musical family, and was the son of a Cambridge Doctor of music who was a respected organist and composer. When George Worgan sailed on the Sirius with the First Fleet he took with him a piano. He was amongst the musicians who played "God Save the King" at Sydney Cove on 7 February 1788 making him one of the first non-Aboriginal musicians in the country. While in New South Wales he taught music to Elizabeth Macarthur (teaching her to play "God Save the King" and "Foote’s Minuet"), leaving his piano with her when he returned to England in 1791.

In 2016, Sydney collector Stewart Symonds donated 130 musical instruments to Edith Cowan University, amongst which was a 1780 'square' (actually rectangular) piano by Frederick Beck, identified as Worgan's First Fleet piano. Media coverage surrounding this piano's return to England in March 2019 for refurbishment revealed a second piano (this one by Longman and Broderip) also alleged to be Worgan's First Fleet piano - both pianos were reportedly sold by the same dealer with similar provenances claiming prior ownership by Elizabeth Macarthur.

== Bibliography ==
- Egan, Jack (1999). Buried Alive: Sydney 1788–92 The Making of a Nation. St Leonards, New South Wales: Allen & Unwin. ISBN 1-86508-138-8.
- "Bright Sparcs Biographical Entry: Worgan, George Bouchier (1757–1838)".
- Gillen, Mollie (1989). The Founders of Australia: A Biographical Dictionary of the first fleet. Sydney: Library of Australian History. ISBN 0-90812-069-9.
- Lancaster, Geoffrey (2015). The First Fleet Piano: A Musician's View. Acton, ACT: ANU Press. ISBN 9781922144652 (ebook) (Volume 1), ISBN 9781925022490 (ebook) (Volume 2).
