= HMS Sirius =

Seven ships of the Royal Navy have been named HMS Sirius after the brightest star in the night sky.

- HMS Sirius (1786) was the flagship of the First Fleet to Australia.
- HMS Sirius (1797) was a 36-gun fifth-rate frigate, and served during the Napoleonic Wars until she was lost at the Battle of Grand Port, Isle de France.
- HMS Sirius (1813) was a fifth-rate frigate. She was never commissioned and apparently spent her whole career at Portsmouth in ordinary until she was broken up there in 1862.
- HMS Sirius (1868) was an Eclipse-class wooden screw sloop sold in 1885.
- HMS Sirius (1890) was an Apollo-class protected cruiser that served in World War I.
- HMS Sirius (82) was a Dido-class light cruiser in World War II.
- HMS Sirius (F40) was a Leander-class frigate in service until 1994.
- SS Sirius (1837)

== Related ==
- HMAS Sirius (O 266) - Royal Australian Navy replenishment vessel, named in honour of First Fleet ship HMS Sirius (1786).
