= Action of 9 February 1799 (South Africa) =

1799 battle of the East Indies theatre of the French Revolutionary Wars

- Part of the East Indies theatre of the French Revolutionary Wars
Date	9 February 1799
Location	Off Southern Africa, Indian Ocean 32°20′S 33°20′E
Result	British victory

Belligerents
Great Britain	France

Commanders and leaders
Henry Lidgbird Ball	Emanuel-Hippolite Le Jolliff (surrendered)

Strength
1 frigate	1 privateer

Casualties and losses
2 killed 11 wounded	27 killed 22 wounded 1 privateer captured

The action of 9 February 1799 was a minor naval engagement of the East Indies theatre of the French Revolutionary Wars between a Royal Navy frigate and a French privateer frigate fought 100 nautical miles (190 km) west of the southeastern coast of what is now Natal in South Africa. The 32-gun French frigate Prudente had since the start of the war been part of a squadron operating from Île de France (now Mauritius). This squadron had dispersed during 1798, with the ships sent on independent commerce raiding operations across the British trade routes in the Indian Ocean. Prudente had subsequently been seized in the autumn of that year by Anne Joseph Hippolyte de Maurès, Comte de Malartic, the Governor of Île de France, and sold to a private raiding company.

In early 1799 Prudente was operating off South Africa, attacking British trade passing to or from the Cape Colony when the ship was discovered by British frigate HMS Daedalus under Captain Henry Lidgbird Ball. Prudente turned away and Ball gave chase, following the French ship closely. After five hours Daedalus caught Prudente and fired a raking broadside into the stern, disabling the French ship. For another hour the action continued at close range until Prudente was forced to surrender.

== Background ==
By 1799 British forces dominated the Indian Ocean, controlling the economically vital trade routes from China, the Dutch East Indies and British India to Europe. The French Navy had originally deployed only two frigates in the region, Prudente and Cybèle, operating from Port Louis on Île de France. This force was subsequently augmented in the summer of 1796 by a large squadron of frigates under Contre-amiral Pierre César Charles de Sercey, which cruised in the East Indies during 1796 and 1797, suffering setbacks at Action of 9 September 1796 and the Bali Strait Incident. During 1798 the squadron dispersed, as his crews became increasingly mutinous and the Colonial Assembly of Île de France grew openly disdainful of his efforts, refusing to provide reinforcements or supplies to his ships.

To mitigate this disaffection, Sercey ordered two of his frigates, Prudente and Forte to cruise in the Bay of Bengal against British trade during the autumn of 1798. When these ships returned, Sercey had already sailed for the east, leaving instructions for the frigates to follow. These orders were however countermanded by the Governor of Île de France, Malartic, who ordered the frigates seized while they were in harbour. Although Sercey protested Malartic's actions, the governor issued new orders to the ships: Forte was sent northeast to operate in the Bay of Bengal off Calcutta while Prudente was partially disarmed and sold to a privateering concern to operate against trade as a commercial investment.

== Battle ==
Command of Prudente was given to Captain Emanuel-Hippolite Le Jolliff, who sailed to the region to the east of the British held Cape Colony to prey on transoceanic merchant shipping sailing to and from Cape Town. The cruise achieved some success, including the seizure of an American merchant ship from Canton, which had been given a prize crew of 17 and armed with 6-pounder guns from Prudente's quarterdeck, leaving the French frigate with only 30 guns including its main battery of 12-pounder long guns. At dawn on 9 February 1799, while sailing approximately 100 nautical miles (190 km) southwest of the coast of Natal a sail was seen to the southeast, approaching rapidly. Recognising a British frigate, La Joliff ordered his ships to separate at 07:00, the American ship sailing south while he took Prudente northwards, hoping to draw off the British ship so that the prize could escape.

The new arrival was HMS Daedalus, a 32-gun 12-pounder Royal Navy frigate under the command of Captain Henry Lidgbird Ball. Ball maintained pursuit of Prudente, running 6 nautical miles (11 km) behind his opponent until 10:00 when La Joliff swung his frigate to starboard with the wind, Ball following close behind. With the British frigate closing, la Joliff ordered his men to begin firing their stern-chasers at Daedalus and at 12:10 hauled up to engage, firing a broadside into the British ship. Ball shortened sail and brought his ship across the stern of Prudente, firing a devastating raking broadside into the French frigate at 12:25. Ball then drew Daedalus alongside Prudente and the ships fought a close range broadside duel, fire from Ball's ship bringing down the mizzenmast on Prudente after 15 minutes. It was only at 13:21, more than an hour after the battle had begun, that La Joliff acknowledged the damage to his ship and struck his colours.

== Aftermath ==
Prudente was badly damaged in the engagement and had lost heavy casualties, including 27 killed and 22 wounded. Losses and damage on Daedalus were much lighter, with only one sailor and one Royal Marine killed and eleven wounded. Ball conducted hasty repairs and then brought the captured Prudente into Table Bay on 15 February. There the captured ship was condemned by the port commander Captain George Losack: although Prudente was a high-quality ship the naval facilities at the Cape Colony were insufficient to conduct the necessary repairs and the French frigate was not subsequently commissioned into the Royal Navy. As a result, there were few rewards for the action, unusually the junior officers of Daedalus were not promoted in the aftermath of the battle. Among the prisoners taken from Prudente was a deserter from the Royal Navy named Thomas Tring, who was subsequently court martialed and hanged.

In the Indian Ocean theatre the loss of Prudente was compounded a few weeks later by the capture of Forte at the action of 28 February 1799, which left Sercey with a shortage of available warships. At the action of 11 December 1799 his last frigate, Preneuse, was intercepted and destroyed off Île de France. A commander without a command, the French admiral returned to France and subsequently retired.
