= Jacob Nagle =

American-born sailor and diarist (1761–1841)

Jacob Nagle (1761–1841) was an American and British soldier, sailor, and, above all, diarist who provides an exceptional first-hand account of many of the dramatic events of his lifetime. His journal covers the period from 1775 to 1841.

== Service in the American Revolutionary War ==
Nagle was born in Reading, Pennsylvania, and fought in the American Revolutionary War along with his father. He was in the Battle of Brandywine and in George Washington's artillery at Valley Forge. He resigned from the Continental Army in 1778 and enlisted in the tiny Continental Navy.

When construction on the USS Saratoga was delayed, Nagle took to sea as a privateer in 1780 on Fair American, then on Rising Sun in 1781. He was captured by the British and taken to St. Kitts in the Caribbean in chains. He was freed when the French Navy captured the island in 1782 but was almost immediately arrested again for aiding British sailors. He was then taken to Martinique. From that point on, he served in the Royal Navy.

== Service in the First Fleet ==
He sailed with the famous First Fleet expedition in 1787 as an able seaman on the expedition's naval escort Sirius. The expedition was charged with the task of founding the first British colony on the continent of Australia, in the territory of New South Wales.

Botany Bay, the First Fleet's designated destination in New South Wales, proved unsuitable for a colony, however, when the expedition landed there in the first month of the new year. The ships of the First Fleet subsequently moved up the New South Wales coastline, under the direction of Captain Arthur Phillip, soon finding refuge in a splendid harbour which would become known as Port Jackson.

Here, on 26 January 1788, Phillip officially founded the Colony of New South Wales, on the site of the future City of Sydney. This key historical event is marked annually in Australia by a public holiday and Australia Day celebrations.

== Shipwrecked in Norfolk Island ==
Sirius subsequently acted as a re-supply vessel and communications link between New South Wales, the Pacific Ocean colony of Norfolk Island, and England. The ship was wrecked on a reef on Norfolk Island in 1790 during one of its replenishment missions. Nagle would spend a year on the island until he was eventually collected by a British vessel and returned to England, arriving there in 1792.

== Life in India ==
He lived his version of the high life until press ganged aboard the Hector in that same year, serving on Hector until certain Bounty Mutineers were taken. In 1794, Nagle jumped to a new ship to go to Madras and Calcutta in India. In India, he linked with two women convicts who had escaped from Sydney and had set up a brothel.

== Service in the Napoleonic Wars ==
In 1795, Nagle returned to England and married. He and his wife had seven children over the ensuing years. In 1796, he served with Admiral Lord Nelson aboard the Blanche, and in 1798 he served on the Netley as "prize-master", which resulted in his making considerable sums of money from captured enemy shipping during the Napoleonic Wars. In 1802, a temporary peace was declared, and so he left the Navy and went to America to visit his family.

== Merchant mariner ==
He then entered the merchant marine, sometimes in American service and sometimes British. Nagle worked on shipping between Portugal and its colony in Brazil, basing himself in Lisbon where he lived from 1811 to 1821. He retired for good from the sea in 1824 shortly after his wife and all their children died of yellow fever.

== Journal and memoir ==
His journal provides a vivid record of the major events and new territories of these decades, and he wrote his Memoirs late in his life.

== See also ==
- First Fleet
- Journals of the First Fleet
