= Sampson Edwards =

British admiral

Admiral Sampson Edwards
- Born: c. 1744
- Died: 14 September 1840 (aged 95–96); Ringwood, Hampshire, United Kingdom
- Relatives: Richard Edwards (uncle); Valentine Collard (nephew)
- Military career
- Allegiance: Kingdom of Great Britain
- Service: Royal Navy
- Rank: Admiral

Admiral Sampson Edwards (c. 1744 – 14 September 1840) was a British naval officer.

== Career ==
Edwards commanded the Canada schooner at Newfoundland station, where she was wrecked in a gale of wind.

Edwards was promoted to Post-Captain on 16 October 1781.

Edwards was promoted to Rear-Admiral on 1 January 1801.

Edwards was promoted to Vice-Admiral on 13 December 1806.

Edwards was promoted to Admiral on 4 June 1814.

Edwards contributed £50 toward the building of the Royal Naval School, a boarding school for the sons of officers in the Royal Navy and Royal Marines from 1833 to 1910.

== Death ==
Edwards died on 14 September 1840 in Ringwood, Hampshire, at the age of 95.
