= HMS Railleur =

Three vessels of the Royal Navy have been named HMS Railleur:

- HMS Railleur (1783) was a French 14-gun sloop-of-war captured in 1783
- HMS Railleur (1797) was a French 20-gun sloop-of-war captured in 1797 and foundered in 1800
- HMS Railleur (1804) was the 20-gun sloop-of-war Henry, purchased in 1804 and sold in 1810
