= HMAT Supply (1759) =

Armed tender of the Royal Navy

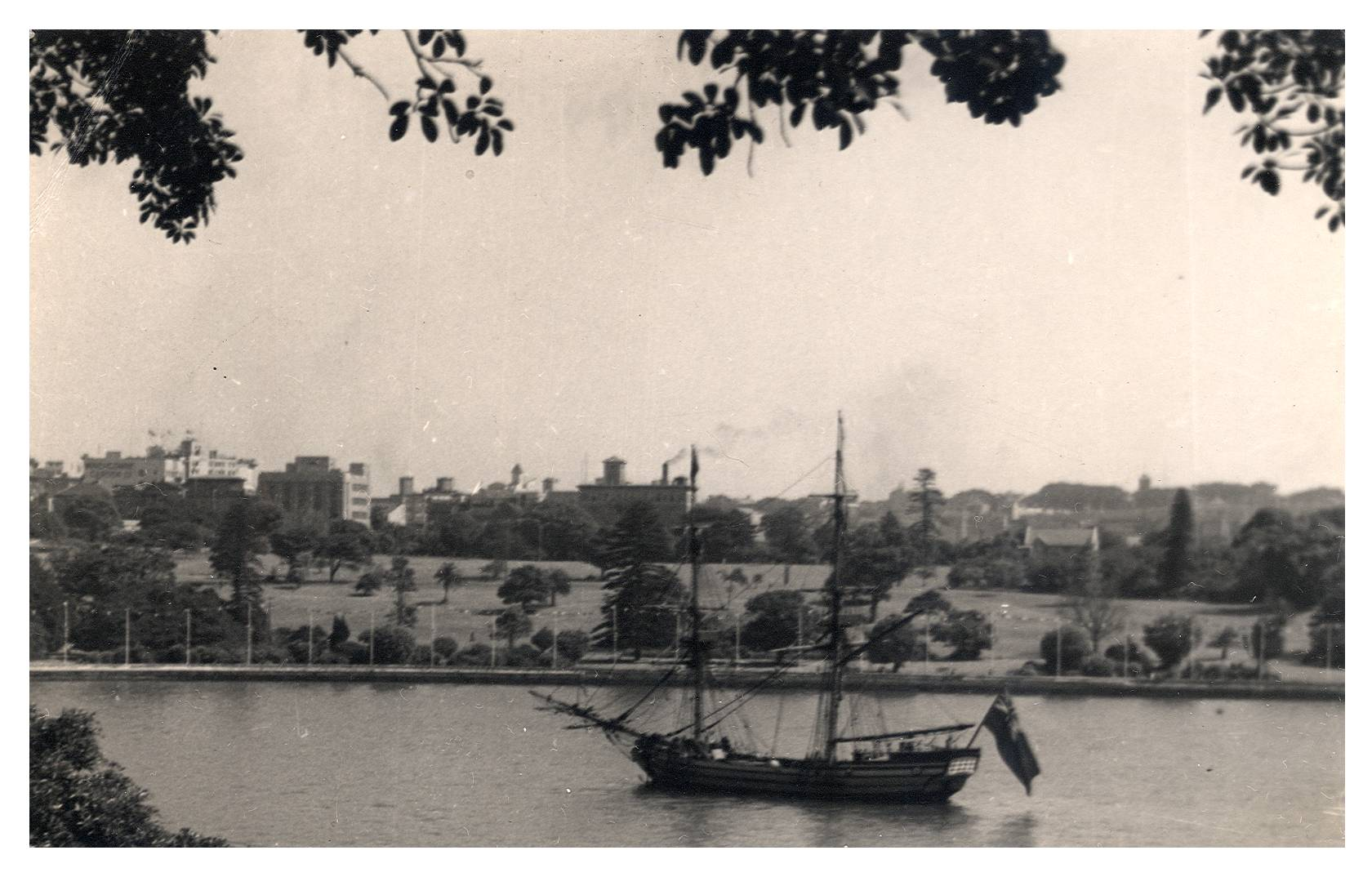
- Replica of HMAT Supply in Sydney Harbour in 1938

History

Great Britain
- Name: HMAT Supply
- Ordered: 4 April 1759
- Builder: Henry Bird, Rotherhithe
- Laid down: 1 May 1759
- Launched: 5 October 1759
- Commissioned: 17 October 1759
- Decommissioned: 21 April 1792
- Out of service: 17 July 1792
- Fate: Sold out of Navy service for £600

Great Britain
- Name: Thomas and Nancy
- Acquired: 1792 by purchase for £600
- Fate: Last listed in 1806

General characteristics
- Class & type: Yard Craft (1759-86); Armed Tender (1786-92)
- Tons burthen: 17476/94 or 186 (bm)
- Length: 79 ft 4 in (24.2 m) overall; 64 ft 11 in (19.8 m) (keel)
- Beam: 22 ft 6 in (6.9 m)
- Depth of hold: 11 ft 6 in (3.5 m)
- Propulsion: Sail
- Complement: 14 as yard craft (1759-86); 55 as armed tender (1786-92)
- Armament: As yard craft: 4 × 3-pounder guns + 6 × 1/2-pounder swivels; As armed tender: 4 × 3-pounder guns, 4 × 12-pounder carronades

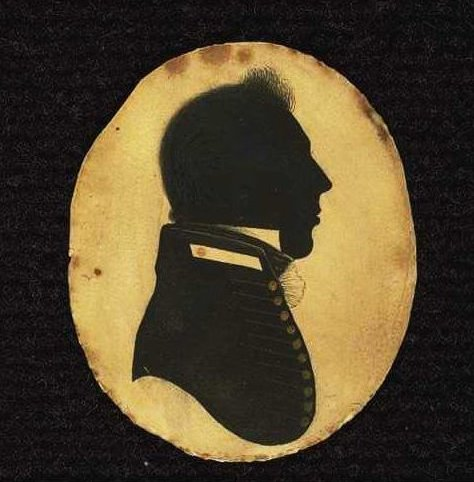
Lt. Henry Lidgbird Ball, Commander of HMAT Supply

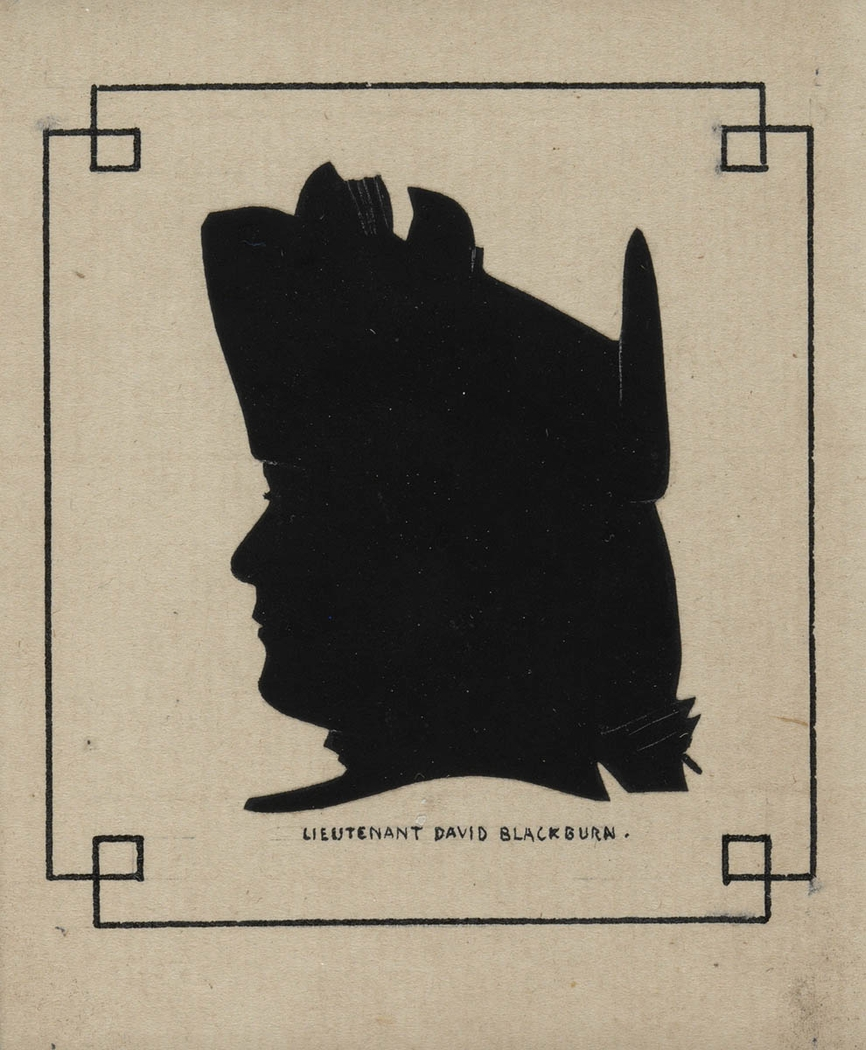
Lt. David Blackburn, Master of HMAT Supply

HMAT Supply was an 8-gun armed tender of the Royal Navy launched in 1759. She played an important part in the foundation of the colony of New South Wales. The Navy sold her in 1792. She then served commercially until about 1806.

HMAT Supply (1759) (Note: HMAT Supply is often referred to as HMS Supply when referencing her time as part of the First Fleet, however the Logs and Musters of the vessel clearly identify her as Supply Armed Tender, not HMS (His Majesty's Ship).) is not to be confused with the replacement vessel HMS Supply (1793), a 10-gun storeship, of 388 tons (bm), originally the American mercantile New Brunswick, which the Admiralty purchased in 1793 as an armed vessel for the colony at Port Jackson and was broken up there in 1806.

== Construction ==
Supply was designed in 1759 by shipwright Thomas Slade, as a yard craft for the ferrying of naval supplies. Construction was contracted to Henry Bird of Rotherhithe, for a vessel measuring 168 20/94 tons (bm) to be built in four months at £8.80 per ton. In practice, construction took about five months from the laying of the keel on 1 May 1759 to launch on 5 October. As built, the vessel was also larger than designed, measuring 174 76/94 tons (bm) and with a length overall of 79 ft 4 in (24.2 m), a beam of 22 ft 6 in (6.9 m), and a hold depth of 11 ft 6 in (3.51 m).

Rigged as a brig, she had two masts, and was fitted with four small 3-pounder cannons and six 1/2-pounder swivel guns. Her armament was substantially increased in 1786 with the addition of four 12-pounder carronades.

Her initial complement was 14 men, rising to 55 when converted to an armed tender for the First Fleet voyage in 1788.

== Service history ==
=== Naval service ===
Supply was used to transport naval supplies between the Thames and Channel ports from 1759 to 1786. Throughout this period, she was based at Deptford Dockyard, undergoing minor repairs as required to maintain seaworthiness.

As one of 2 Royal Navy escorts to the First Fleet, she left Spithead on 13 May 1787 and was the first to arrive in Botany Bay on 18 January 1788, as recorded in the journals of William Bradley and John Hunter of HMS Sirius, which arrived on 20 January. Supply was under the command of Captain Arthur Phillip (who had transferred from Sirius at Cape Town). She was captained by Henry Lidgbird Ball, the master was David Blackburn, and the surgeon was James Callam. Supply was also the first ship to sail into Port Jackson after the original Botany Bay landing was found unsuitable for settlement.

After the establishment of the initial settlement at Port Jackson, Supply was the link between the colony and Norfolk Island, making 10 trips. Following the loss of Sirius in 1790, she became the colony's only link with the outside world. On 17 April 1790, she was sent to Batavia for supplies, returning on 19 September, her captain having chartered a Dutch vessel, Waakzaamheid, to follow with more stores.

Supply left Port Jackson on 26 November 1791 and sailed via Cape Horn, reaching Plymouth on 21 April 1792.

A number of David Blackburn's letters to family and friends have survived. These letters describe the events of the voyage and the early days of settlement, including Blackburn's participation in the expedition to Norfolk Island to establish a settlement there in February 1788.

=== Later service ===
The Admiralty sold her at auction in July 1792 and her new owners renamed her Thomas and Nancy. She then carried coal in the Thames area until 1806.

=== Replacement ===
In October 1793, the Admiralty purchased the American mercantile ship New Brunswick, named her HMS Supply, and sent her out to New South Wales to replace her predecessor as an armed vessel for the colony at Port Jackson and she was broken up there in 1806.

== Postscript ==
A New South Wales Urban Transit Authority First Fleet ferry was named after Supply in 1984.

== See also ==
- Journals of the First Fleet
- Longitude watch K1
