= Waaksamheyd (ship) =

History

Dutch Republic
- Name: Waakzaamheid

General characteristics
- Tons burthen: 300 tons

Waakzaamheid (Waaksamheyd, Waakzamkeit) was a Dutch 300 ton burthen snow, which the Colony of New South Wales chartered to bring stores and supplies to the Colony and then transport Captain John Hunter to England to face a court-martial for the loss of HMS Sirius.

Captain Henry Lidgbird Ball of HMS Supply, while picking up supplies for the Colony of New South Wales in Batavia, chartered the Waakzaamheid to follow with more stores. Captain Detme Smit of the Waakzaamheid arrived at Port Jackson on 17 December 1790 with stores of rice, beef, pork, and flour.

Waakzaamheid left Port Jackson on 27 March 1791 with 125 men on board. She sailed via Batavia and then onto Mindanao. While seeking provisions on Mindanao, the shore party was attacked by natives, without any loss. Waakzaamheid, Hunter, master, finally arrived at Portsmouth on 8 April 1792.
