= HMS Sirius (1786) =

Sloop-of-war of the Royal Navy

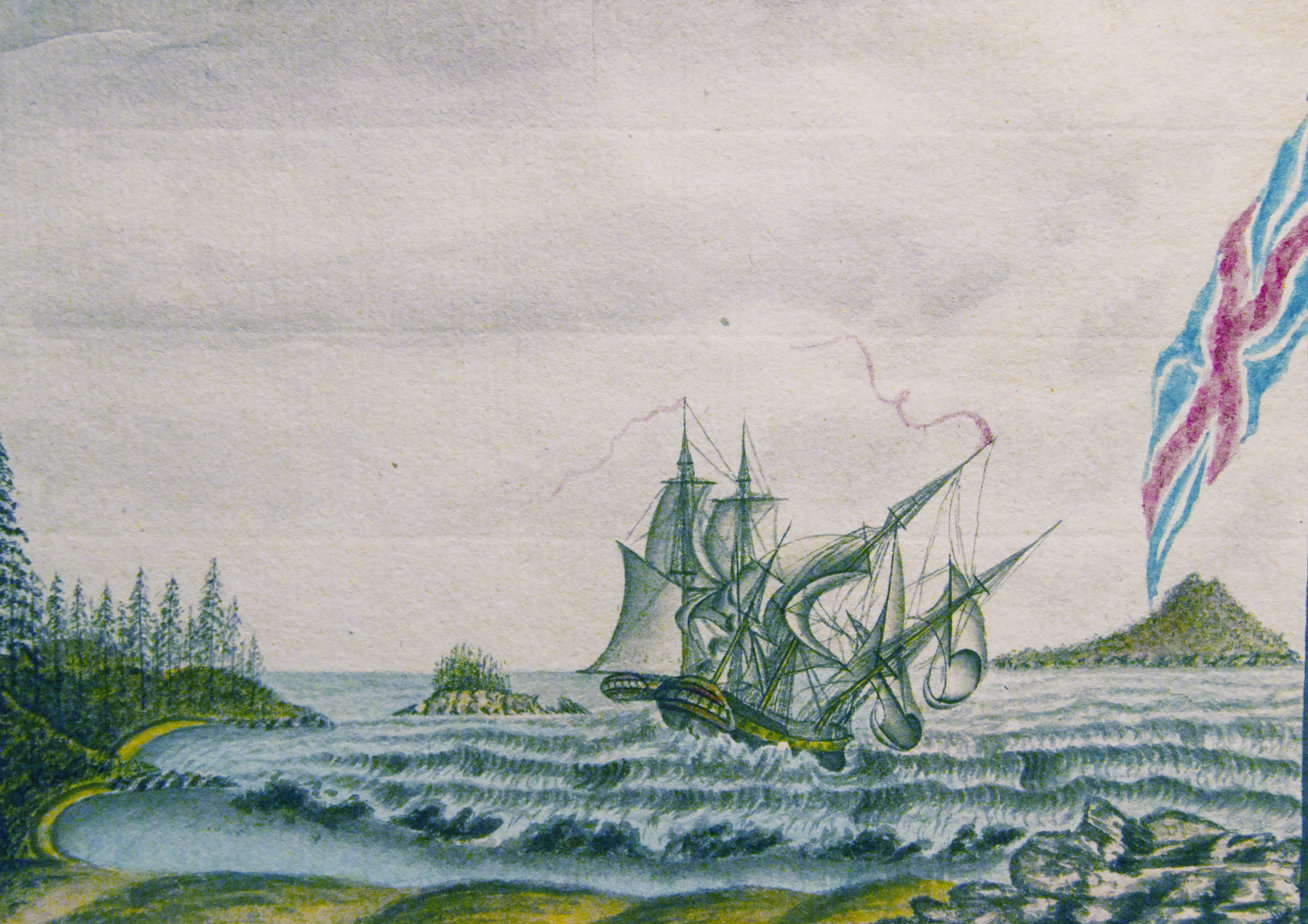
- The melancholy loss of HMS Sirius off Norfolk Island March 19th 1790, George Raper

History

Great Britain
- Name: HMS Sirius
- Builder: Watson, Rotherhithe
- Launched: 1780
- Acquired: November 1781
- Renamed: Berwick (as launched); HMS Berwick (1781–1786); HMS Sirius (1786–1790)
- Fate: Wrecked 19 March 1790 29°03′37″S 167°57′18″E

General characteristics
- Class & type: 10-gun ship
- Tons burthen: 51183/94 (bm)
- Length: 110 ft 5 in (33.7 m) (gundeck), 89 ft 8.75 in (27.3 m) (keel)
- Beam: 32 ft 9 in (9.98 m)
- Depth of hold: 13 ft (4 m)
- Sail plan: Full-rigged ship
- Complement: 50
- Armament: 10 guns: 4 × 6pdrs; 6 × 18pdr carronades

HMS Sirius was a 10-gun sloop-of-war of the Royal Navy, launched in 1781 as the merchant ship Berwick. She was the flagship of the First Fleet, which sailed from Portsmouth, England, in 1787 to establish the first European colony in New South Wales, Australia. Sirius played a critical role in supplying and protecting the fledgling colony, including transporting essential provisions from the Cape of Good Hope. On 19 March 1790, she was wrecked on a reef at Norfolk Island while landing supplies, leaving the colony with only a single naval vessel. Her wreck site and surviving artefacts are now protected as part of Australia’s maritime heritage.

== Construction ==
Sirius had been converted from the merchantman Berwick. There has been confusion over the early history of Berwick. A note about her by future New South Wales governor Philip Gidley King, describing her as a former 'East country man', was interpreted for many years as relating to the East Indies trade; however, analysis of the maritime nomenclature of the time suggests that this description referred instead to ships participating in the Baltic trade.

Berwick was likely built in 1780 by Christopher Watson and Co. of Rotherhithe, who also built another ship of the First Fleet, Prince of Wales. Berwick had a burthen of 511 83/94 tons (bm) and, after being burnt in a fire, was bought and rebuilt by the Royal Navy in November 1781, retaining her original name.

== As HMS Berwick ==
The newly purchased vessel was fitted out and coppered at Deptford Dockyard between December 1781 and April 1782, for a total sum of £6,152.11s.4d. When completed she carried 10 guns, four 6-pounder long guns, and six 18-pounder carronades. She was commissioned for service under her first commander, Lieutenant Bayntun Prideaux in January 1782, and went out to North America later that year. She spent the last part of the American War of Independence there, transferring to the West Indies in June 1784. Paid off in February 1785 she was initially laid up before being fitted for sea between September and December 1786 for service with the First Fleet. She was nominally rated as a sixth-rate, allowing her to be commanded by a post-captain, though she retained her armament of only 10 guns, and on 12 October 1786 Berwick was renamed Sirius, after the southern star Sirius.

== Voyage of the First Fleet ==
Sirius sailed from The Motherbank, Ryde, Isle of Wight on 13 May 1787 as the flagship of the eleven-vessel First Fleet, under the command of Captain Arthur Phillip (Governor-designate of the new colony). Phillip transferred to the Armed Tender HMS Supply at Cape Town, with Second Captain John Hunter remaining in command of Sirius. Also on board were Marine Major Robert Ross, who would be responsible for colony security and surgeons George Bouchier Worgan and Thomas Jamison. Midshipman Daniel Southwell recorded that Sirius was carrying the Larcum Kendall K1 marine chronometer used by Captain James Cook on his second and third voyages around the world. She arrived in Botany Bay on 20 January 1788, two days after Supply, according to the journals of Hunter and First Lieutenant (later Rear Admiral) William Bradley The 252-day voyage had gone via Rio de Janeiro and the Cape of Good Hope and covered more than 15,000 miles (24,000 km). It was quickly decided that Botany Bay was unsuitable for a penal settlement and an alternative location was sought. While waiting to move, a large gale arose preventing any sailing; during this period the French expeditionary fleet of Jean-François de Galaup, comte de Lapérouse arrived in Botany Bay. The colony was established at Sydney Cove in Port Jackson when Governor Phillip arrived on 26 January aboard Supply. Sirius arrived the following day.

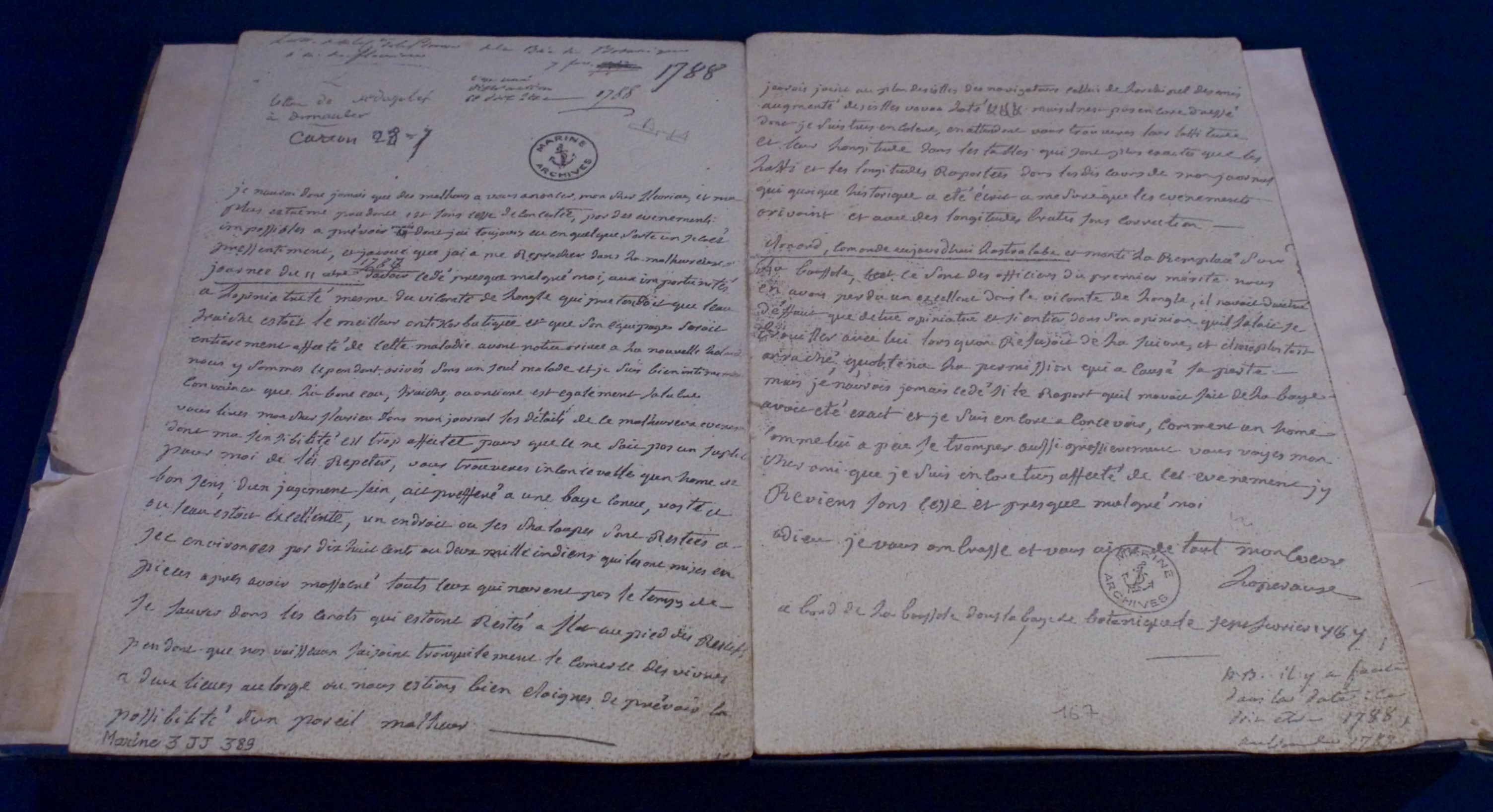
The last letter by Lapérouse, which was returned to Europe by HMS Andrew.

The British cordially received the French. Sirius's captains, through their officers, offered assistance and asked if Lapérouse needed supplies. However the French leader and the British commanders never met personally.

Lapérouse also took the opportunity to send his journals, some charts and some letters back to Europe with Sirius. After obtaining wood and fresh water, the French left on 10 March for New Caledonia, Santa Cruz, the Solomons, the Louisiades, and the western and southern coasts of Australia. The French fleet and all on board were never seen again. The documents carried by Sirius would be its only testament. Decades later it was discovered that Lapérouse's expedition had been shipwrecked on the island of Vanikoro.

Sirius left Port Jackson under the command of Hunter on 2 October 1788, when she was sent back to the Cape of Good Hope to get flour and other supplies. The complete voyage, which took more than seven months to complete, returned just in time to save the near-starving colony.

In 1789, she was refitted in Mosman Bay, which was originally named Great Sirius Cove after the vessel. The name lives on in the adjacent Sirius Cove (formerly "Little Sirius Cove").

On 19 March 1790, Sirius was wrecked on a reef at Norfolk Island while landing stores. Among those who witnessed the ship's demise from shore was Thomas Jamison, the surgeon for the penal settlement. Jamison would eventually become Surgeon-General of New South Wales. Sirius's crew was stranded on Norfolk Island until they were rescued on 21 February 1791. Hunter returned to England aboard Waaksamheyd where he faced court martial and was honourably acquitted. He was appointed as Phillip's successor as Governor of New South Wales in February 1795, though he did not return to the colony until September. One of the sailors on Sirius, Jacob Nagle, wrote a first-hand account of the ship's last voyage, wreck, and the crew's stranding. With the settlement in New South Wales still on the brink of starvation, the loss of Sirius left the colonists with only one navy ship.

== Legacy ==
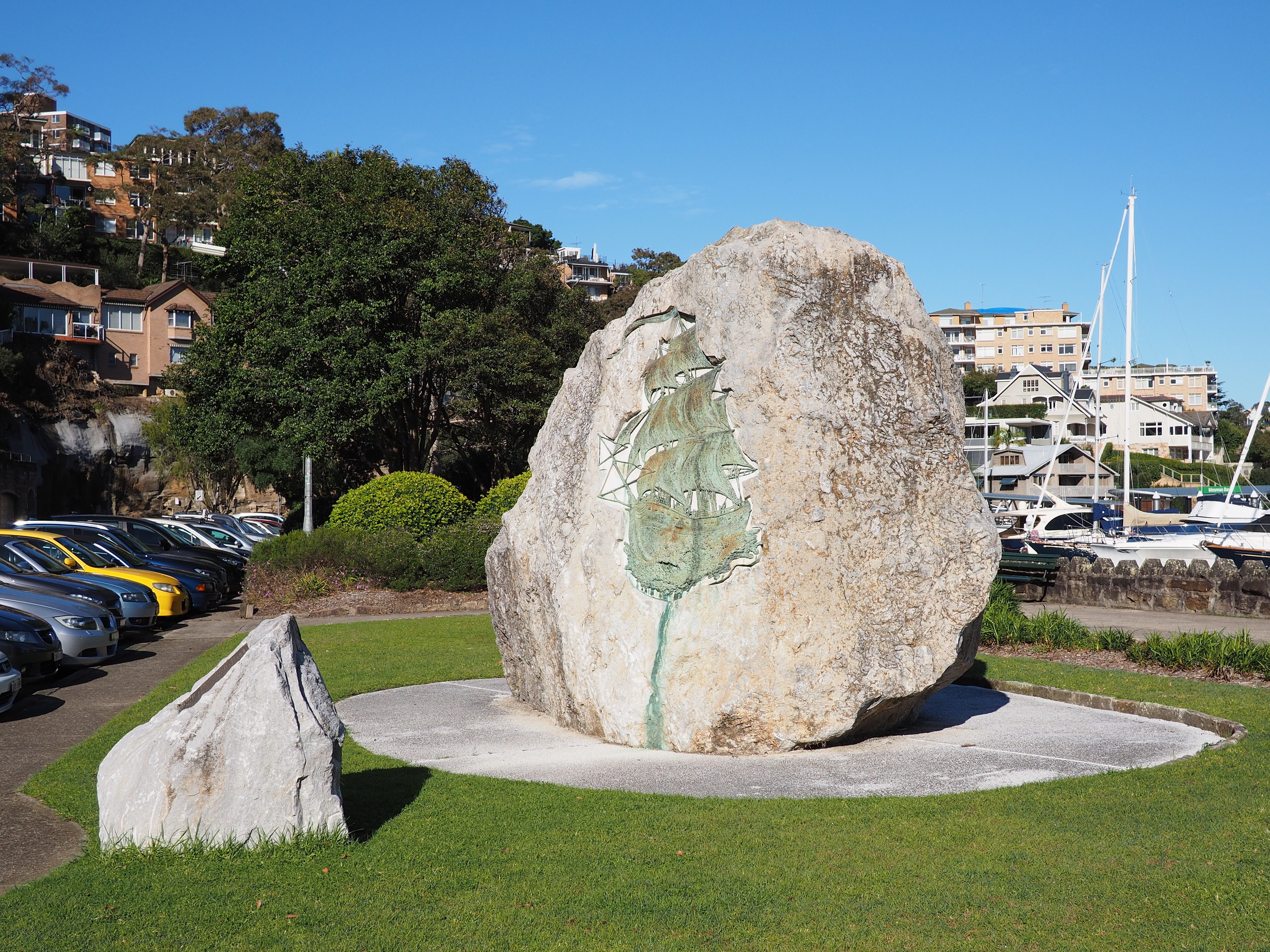
The HMS Sirius memorial in the Sydney suburb of Mosman.

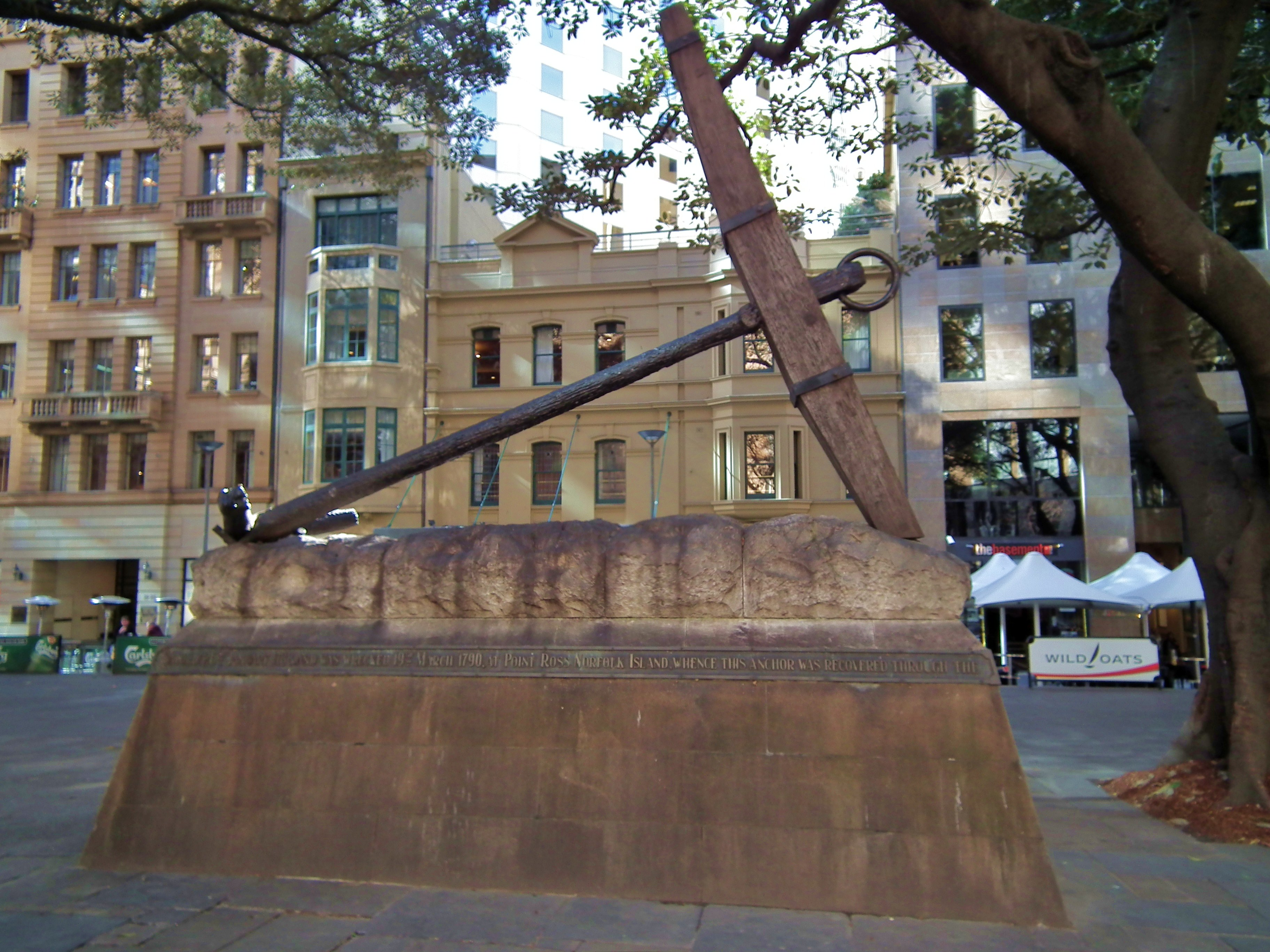
Anchor from HMS Sirius in Sydney.

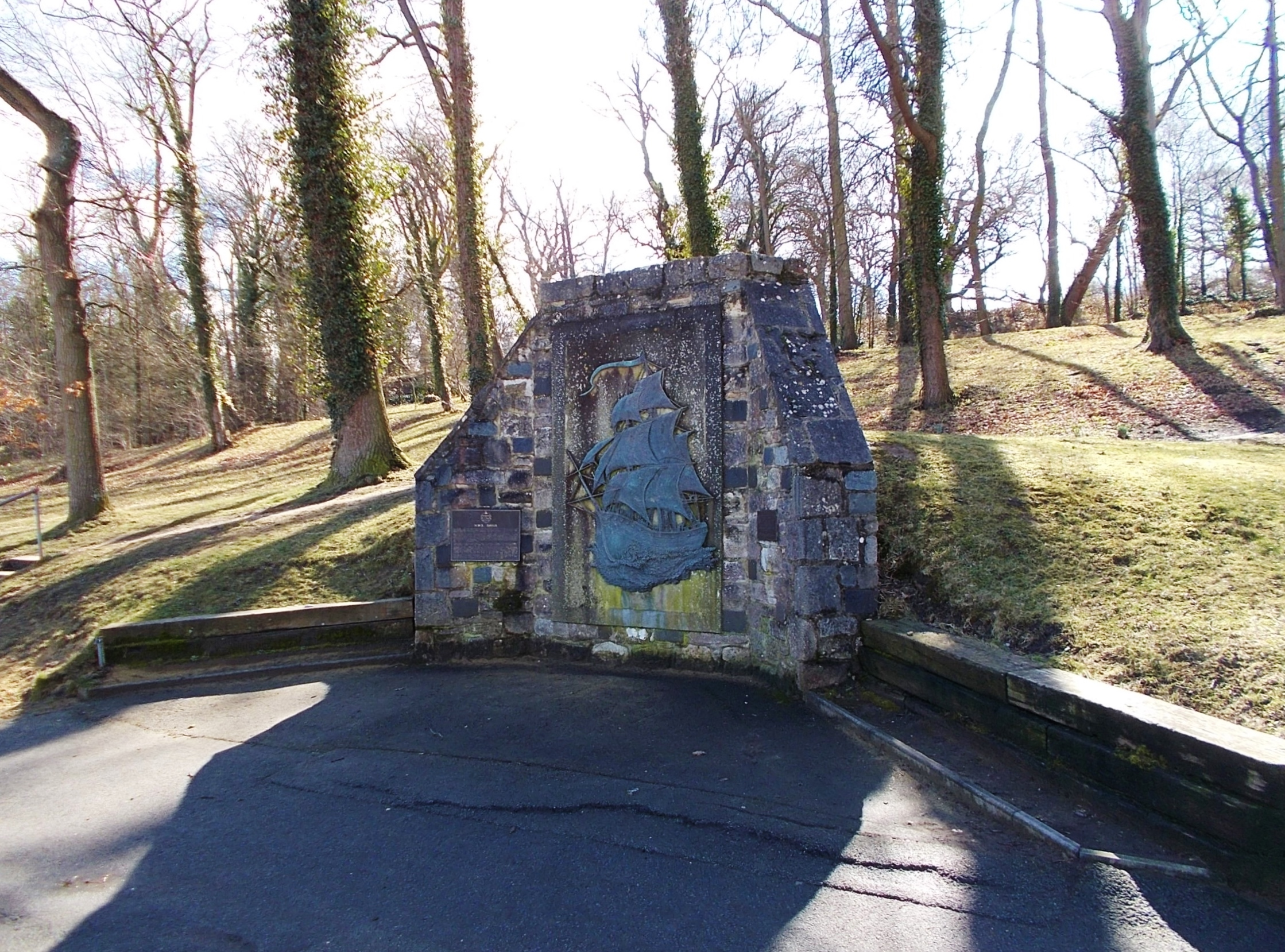
Monument erected in memory of HMS Sirius at Appley Park, Ryde, Isle of Wight, UK. The fleet sailed from offshore of this location.

Many artefacts have been retrieved from the Sirius wreck. They include three anchors and two carronades. Objects are displayed in the Norfolk Island Museum. Another anchor, as well as a cannon, are on display in Macquarie Place, Sydney. Other Sirius artefacts including an anchor can be viewed at the Australian National Maritime Museum in Sydney. A detailed 1:24 scale model of Sirius is displayed in the Powerhouse Museum, Sydney. Small models of all the First Fleet ships are displayed in the Museum of Sydney.

The Sirius wrecksite is protected by the Commonwealth Historic Shipwrecks Act 1976 and is listed on the Australian National Heritage List.

An Urban Transit Authority First Fleet ferry was named after Sirius in 1984. Bas-relief memorials to the ship were erected in the Sydney suburb of Mosman, Norfolk Island and Ryde, Isle of Wight in 1989, 1990 and 1991 respectively.

The scientific name of the tiny crustacean Mallacoota sirius recalls HMS Sirius. The specimens of this species were collected from the point on the reef where Sirius wrecked.

== See also ==
- Journals of the First Fleet
