= Henry Inman (police officer) =

- Born: Henry Inman; 4 June 1816; Portsea Island, Hampshire, England
- Died: 18 November 1895 (aged 79)
- Resting place: All Saints Churchyard, North Scarle, Lincolnshire
- Education: Private tutors, St Paul’s School Southsea, St Bees Theological College.
- Occupations: Cavalryman, Police Superintendent, Clergyman
- Employer: South Australia Police
- Organization: Colony of South Australia
- Known for: Founder and first to command the South Australia Police 1838, dismissed 1840
- Notable work: Laureate Cross of Saint Ferdinand, awarded 1836, First Carlist War
- Style: Captain, Auxiliary Legion; Superintendent, South Australia Police; Rector, Anglican Church
- Spouse(s): Mary Fooks Lipson (1820–1898), a daughter of Captain Thomas Lipson RN.
- Parent(s): Revd Dr James Inman DD (1776–1869) and Mary Inman (1782–1870)

Henry Inman (1816–1895) was an English cavalry officer, pioneer of South Australia, founder and first commander of the South Australia Police, overlander and Anglican clergyman.

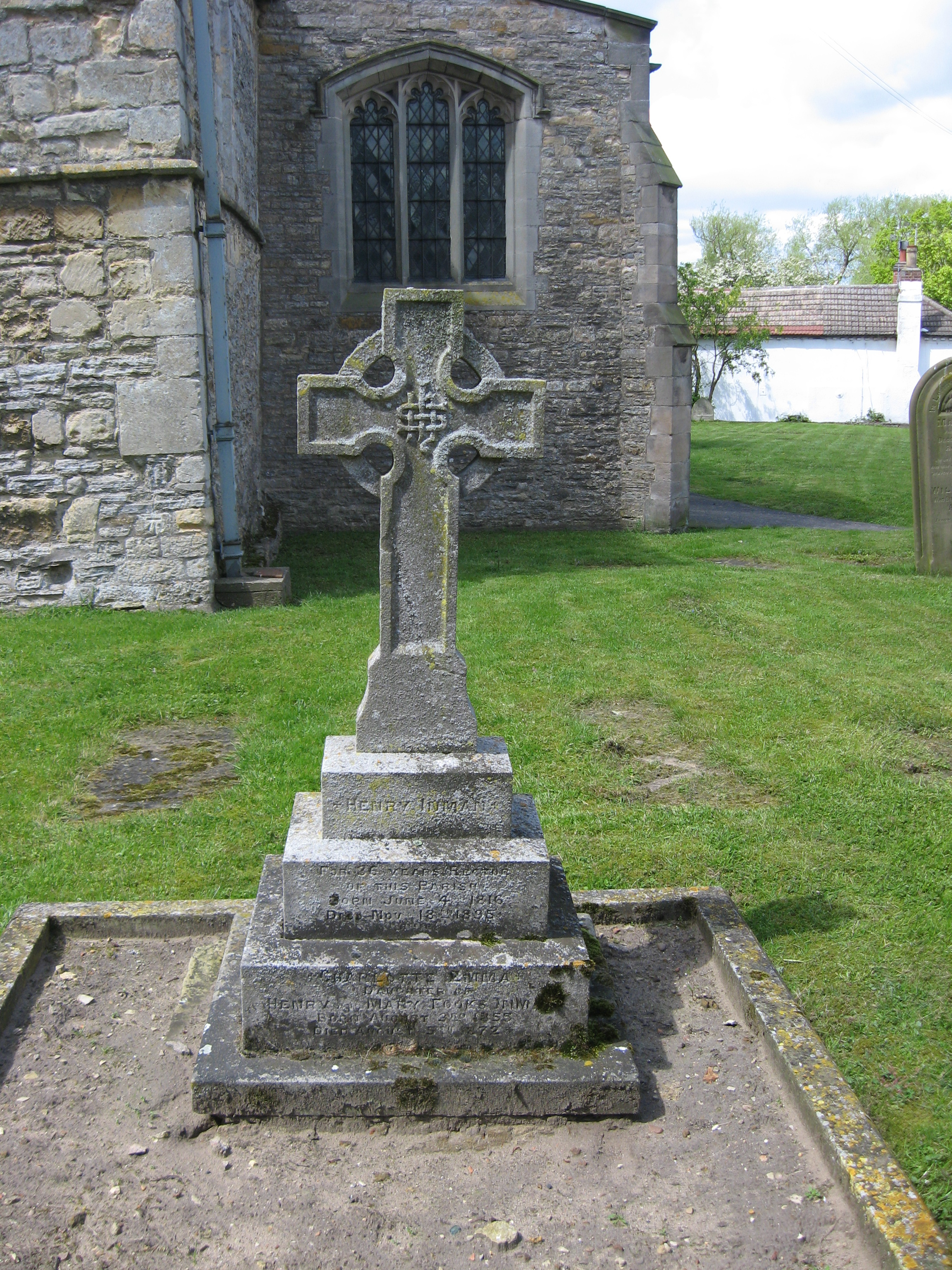
Henry Inman's grave, All Saints churchyard, North Scarle, UK.

== Origins ==
Inman was born 4 June 1816 at Portsea Island, Hampshire, the youngest son among seven children of Revd Dr James Inman DD (1776–1869) and Mary Inman (1782–1870). His father, Professor of Mathematics at the Royal Naval College, Portsmouth, sailed in Australian waters in 1803 as astronomer for Matthew Flinders. His mother, a daughter of Revd Richard Williams, rector of Oakham, Rutland, was a direct descendant of the mother of Sir Isaac Newton by her second husband. His eldest brother, James Williams Inman, was headmaster of The King's School, Grantham, Lincoln. Inman was educated privately, then at St Paul's School, Southsea, his father being chairman of the school board.

== Military service ==
In 1833, at age 17, Inman enlisted for the Portuguese Liberal Wars, in which England was formally neutral, first serving at the court of Empress Dona Maria II of Portugal, and then as a cadet lancer. Returning to England in 1834, in 1835 he joined the British Auxiliary Legion in the First Carlist War in Spain as a lieutenant in 1st (Queen Isabella's) Lancers, commanded by William Wakefield. Wakefield's brother was influential in plans to establish a free colony in South Australia, where Inman's father, another supporter of the colony, was among the first land investors. For individual gallantry in action Inman was awarded the Laureate Cross of Saint Ferdinand, then later promoted to captain and adjutant of the 8th Regiment.

== Arrival at South Australia ==
After the war, carrying a letter of introduction from Colonel Torrens, chairman of the Colonization Commission in England, to Colonel William Light, Surveyor General in South Australia, Inman sailed for Adelaide on the Royal Admiral, intending to join Light's survey parties. Arriving in January 1838, for the next four months Inman entered a short-lived partnership as a commission agent with two former Royal Admiral shipmates, Porter Helmore and Charles Calton. He also became a fast friend of pioneer entrepreneur J. B. Hack, who persuaded him not to join Light's hard-pressed surveyors. Hack knew that the first Governor of South Australia, John Hindmarsh, had already sought permission from Lord Glenelg to form a police force, and was preparing a cost estimate.

The Colonization Commissioners had originally postponed forming a regular police force, due to expense and lack of expected criminality from the initial cohort of free settlers; so there were only a few part-time special constables, plus a small guard of disgruntled Royal Marines attached to the Governor. Hindmarsh and the settlers were increasingly concerned that, without proper protection, escaped convicts from the eastern penal colonies would ravage them. Unbeknown to those in Adelaide, in June 1838 the Colonization Commissioners recruited from the London police two experienced sub-inspectors, James Stuart and William Baker Ashton, who were intended to create the force. Unbeknown to those in London, these plans had already been precipitated following a burglary, a murder, and two attempted murders in Adelaide during March 1838. As a private citizen, Inman took part in the pursuit and capture of one suspect.

== Foundation of South Australia Police ==
Hindmarsh created the South Australian Police Force (since renamed South Australia Police) on 28 April 1838, appointing 21-year-old Henry Inman as sole commander, with the rank of Inspector. In effect, if not by title, Inman was its first Police Commissioner. Inman then recruited “twenty active young men” and commenced founding the police, purchasing necessary horses and equipment. It was the first centrally controlled police force in Australia, and the first with jurisdiction over an entire colony. In accordance with instructions from Hindmarsh, Inman organised the force into two distinct divisions; foot police for the town of Adelaide and a para-military mounted police. The latter, with cavalry standards, were fully armed and prepared for mobile operations at the frontiers of settlement. At the time there was no exact parallel for such a police force, either in England or the other Australian colonies. When sub-inspectors Stuart and Ashton arrived in November 1838 they found the police already formed and operating. Both then served under Inman.

Over the following two years Inman made a decisive contribution to the growth of the police force, opening a barracks in Adelaide and police stations at several country locations. In August 1838 Inman led a police party in pursuit of two allegedly escaped convicts near Encounter Bay, arresting one in an unnamed river valley that, by association, have both since borne his name: Inman Valley and Inman River. In September 1838 Inman led the police party that accompanied Charles Sturt on an exploration to the Murray Mouth.

After the recall of Hindmarsh, Inman worked closely with his replacement, Governor Gawler, who arrived in October 1838. Gawler promoted Inman to Superintendent of Police, effective 17 October 1838. Among other things, the pair designed the first police uniforms. In December 1838, Inman accompanied Gawler on an exploration of the Encounter Bay region.

Tall and lanky, the strong and courageous Inman was an active and effective field commander, personally leading many investigations in the pursuit of bushrangers and other offenders. He set a strong Christian moral tone, such that none of the police were indolent or corrupt. However, he was such a disappointment as an administrator and financial manager that Gawler appointed a four-man Board of Police Commissioners in December 1839 to ensure oversight of the force. That same month, Inman accompanied Gawler and Sturt on a Murray River expedition, during which they discovered Mount Bryan, naming it after Henry Bryan, a fellow expeditioner who became lost and then perished.

On 19 January 1839 Henry Inman married Mary Fooks Lipson (1820–1898) at Holy Trinity Church, Adelaide. Mary was the daughter of Captain Thomas Lipson RN (1783–1863) and Elizabeth Emma Fooks (1790–1880), and was born at Rennes, Ille-et-Vilaine, Bretagne (Brittany), France, on 27 March 1820, while her father was on half-pay from the British Royal Navy. Her father had previously been commander of the Revenue cutter HMS Lapwing stationed at Mill Bay, Plymouth, Devon. In South Australia Thomas Lipson was prominently associated with the foundation of the marine affairs as first Harbourmaster and Collector of Customs. Through the marriage of other Lipson sisters, Inman later became brother in law to John Allan, George Strickland Kingston, and James Collins Hawker, though he had close association with Allan and Hawker only. Allan was brother in law to John Baker (Australian politician).

== Dismissal ==
With Gawler's support, Inman had augmented the force to 70 men by April 1840. Gawler dismissed Inman on 18 May 1840, after an inquiry revealed potential conflict of interest in supplying forage hay that Inman had bought from John Baker for the police horses. Admitting imprudence, Inman vehemently denied any criminal intent. Appreciated but unlamented, Inman was replaced by Thomas Shuldham O'Halloran as first to bear the title Police Commissioner.

== Overlander ==
At Hack's suggestion, Inman then embarked on overlanding for James Chisholm, a prominent pastoralist at Goulburn NSW. Accompanied by Chisholm's Adelaide agent Henry Field (1818–1909), their 11-man party, jointly led by Inman and Field, left Goulburn for Adelaide in late January 1841, droving 5,000 sheep. Through organisational folly, the party was undermanned and underarmed. They no sooner begun when Inman was attacked by Australian Aborigines on the Murrumbidgee River. Hit in the back by three spears, Inman was carried onward upon a cart litter but remarkably recovered. Seven weeks later, on 16 April 1841, at Chowilla near the NSW-SA border, about 300–400 Aboriginals, enraged by earlier clashes with violent overlanders, attacked the weak party. The sheep and goods were plundered, while the drovers narrowly escaped with their lives.

In June 1841, Inman was appointed by Governor George Grey as one of the four captains of the special constable volunteers in a 68-man police expedition, led by O’Halloran, that returned to the attack site to recover the sheep and protect other overlanders then due, in particular the party of Charles Langhorne (1812–1855). Upon arrival they found that Langhorne's party had been attacked at the Rufus River two days earlier, on 20 June 1841, resulting in the deaths of five Aboriginals and four Europeans. Although the Langhorne survivors and their cattle were rescued, none of the sheep were recovered and Inman was financially ruined. These events were a catalyst for further conflict at the Rufus in August 1841 resulting in at least 30 Aboriginal deaths—a conflict known as the Rufus River Massacre, part of the Australian frontier wars.

== Teacher and clergyman ==
Inman moved to Goulburn in 1841, as a settler, where his family later joined him. Unsuccessful as a settler, and being influenced by William Sowerby (1799–1875), first Anglican clergyman at Goulburn, Inman determined to take holy orders. After several years of preparatory studies, amid teaching at Sowerby's school, Inman moved to Sydney, where on 1 October 1846 he was appointed Mathematical Master at Sydney College, precursor to Sydney Grammar School. After a brief visit to Adelaide in 1847, he returned to England in 1848, along with his family, entering the Anglican ministry through St Bees Theological College. After ordination he served as a curate, first at Tarleton, then at Newburgh, Lancashire.

In 1859 he was appointed rector of All Saints, North Scarle, Lincolnshire, where he was to serve 36 years, until his death there 18 November 1895. Interred at All Saints churchyard, his obituarist stated that ‘his quiet and inoffensive manner gained for himself the regard and esteem of many of his parishioners. He was ever ready to render any assistance he possibly could: and in him the young especially will miss a true and kind-hearted friend when starting out in life’. Inman never fully overcame his financial tribulations, declaring bankruptcy in 1862, and leaving his widow a net estate of £108. Mary Inman died at nearby Swinderby on 20 January 1898.

Henry and Mary Inman had ten children, four boys and six girls. Of their six daughters none had children, while only one married. Their third son, Edward Master Lipson Inman, a Lieutenant in the 60th King's Royal Rifles, was killed in action, aged 27, on 28 January 1881 in the heroic charge at the Battle of Laing's Nek, Natal, South Africa, during the First Boer War.

There is no known photograph or portrait of Henry Inman and he published no memoir. Modern historians knew very little about Inman's life, and much of that quite inaccurate, until a biography was published in 2010.

== Sources ==
- "Despatch from Governor Grey to Lord John Russell (May 29, 1841)", Accounts and Papers 1843, Volume 3 (London: William Clowes and Sons), pp. 267–272. [This includes a deposition of Inman, about being attacked when he was droving sheep.]
- Bull, J. W. (1878). Early Experiences of Colonial Life in South Australia. Adelaide. see also Early Experiences of Colonial Life in South Australia
- Dutton, F. S. (1846). South Australia and its Mines. London: T. and W. Boone.
- Nettlebeck A. (1999), "Mythologising frontier: Narrative versions of the Rufus River conflict, 1841‐1899", Journal of Australian Studies, 23: 75–82; doi:10.1080/14443059909387476.
- O'Halloran, Thomas Shuldham (1904). "From Adelaide Along the River Murray to the Rufus and Lake Victoria". Proceedings of the Royal Geographical Society of Australasia: South Australian Branch. 7: 70–91.
- Slee, Max (2010). Inman: first commander of the South Australia Police. Adelaide: Seaview Press. ISBN 978-1-74008-559-5.
- Tolmer, Alexander (1882). Reminiscences of an Adventurous and Chequered Career at Home and at the Antipodes. Vol. 1 and 2. London. [Both volumes are available at the Internet Archive.]
