= St Bees Theological College =

Former theological college in England

Coordinates: 54.4936°N 3.5941°W

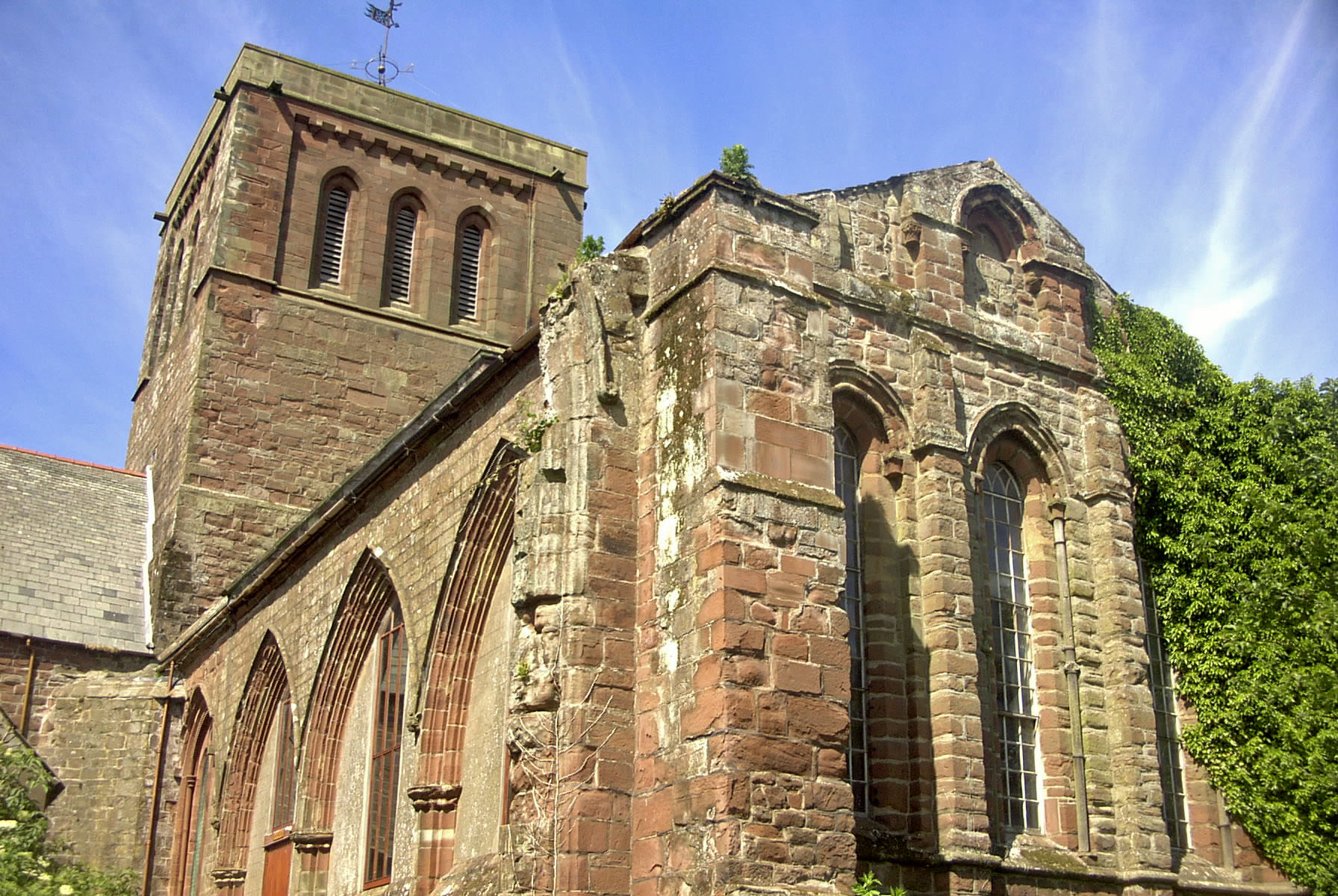
The monastic chancel of St Bees Priory, which was roofed to become the main lecture room of the college (interior shown below)

St Bees Theological College, close to the coast of Cumberland, was the first independent theological college to be established for the training of Church of England ordinands. It was founded in 1816 by George Henry Law, Bishop of Chester, in what was during those years the northern extremity of his diocese. For many subsequent years the vicar of St Bees was effectively both the principal of the college and also its proprietor.

The college drew students both from England and from Wales. It catered particularly for those prospective ordinands for whom the cost of a traditional university degree course would have been prohibitive. They attended lectures and had their library within the rebuilt chancel of St Bees Priory, whilst living in lodgings throughout the parish. Over 2,600 clergy are believed to have trained at the college during the course of its history. Lacking an adequate corporate administrative and financial basis, and also suffering from a loss of much individual interest from subsequent bishops of Chester and bishops of Carlisle, the theological college finally closed in 1895.

== Establishment ==
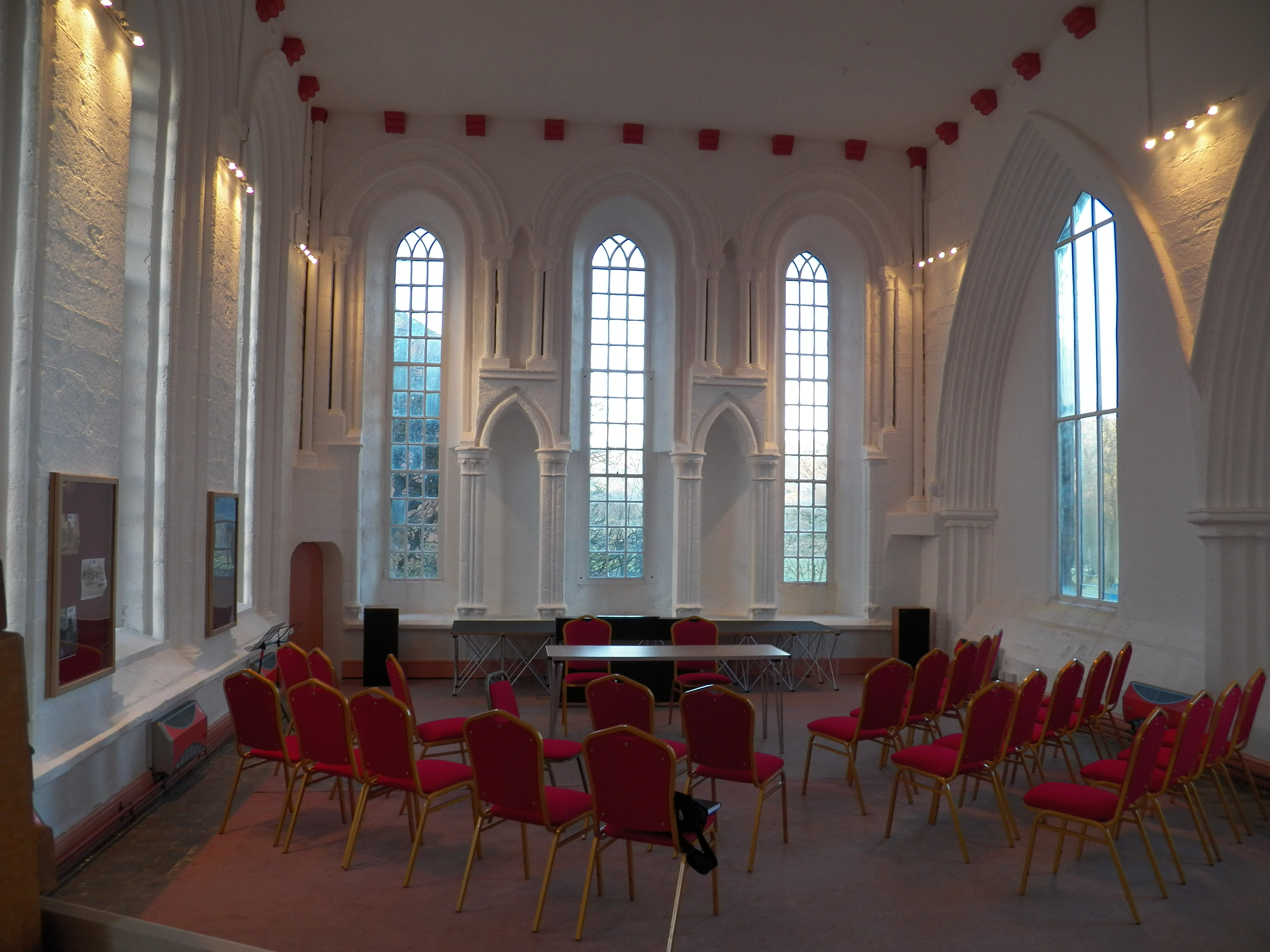
The interior of the monastic chancel, which was the first lecture room

Bishop George Henry Law of Chester had a severe problem with the shortage of new good clergy in his large and growing diocese. He had local connections with West Cumbria, and on a visit in 1816 saw an opportunity to found a college for training of ordinands at St Bees. The Lowthers had become very rich through their extensive coal mines in Whitehaven, but were now in a difficult position. They had manipulated the governors of St Bees School to lease the lucrative mineral rights of Whitehaven from St Bees School for a derisory amount by means of a forged document. This was now coming to light, mainly through the efforts of the Rev W Wilson, headmaster of St Bees School, who whistle-blew, but was sacked for his pains in 1816. But the story was out, and the Lowthers were anxious for an opportunity to restore their reputation. They were receptive to Bishop Law's suggestion that they fund the building of a college at St Bees.

The Lowthers offered to restore the ruined chancel of the monastic church to house the college, and donated land for a vicarage. They offered to Bishop Law the patronage of the living, which they held, so that the principal of the new college would also be the vicar of St Bees. Law grasped this opportunity, and so was born St Bees Theological College. This was to be a pioneering institution; the first Church of England College for the training of clergy outside the universities of Oxford and Cambridge.

By 1817 the repair work was complete. The roofless monastic chancel had been restored, and became the main lecture room for the college. News of the college soon spread, and it first opened to admit 20 students, who paid £5 a term. Although the principal would also perform all the duties of the vicar, the college was effectively a private business. Perhaps surprisingly, the college offered no accommodation, and students lodged in the village. Students had a very good chance of employment in the Diocese of Chester, and the cost of living and fees were much lower than at the two universities.

== Growth ==
The first principal, William Ainger, was only 31 when appointed, and had no previous experience of running a theological institution. However, the college prospered immediately, with numbers rising to 36 admissions in 1822. Ainger had to work alone until 1826, when the increasing scope of the training course obliged him to take on an assistant, the Rev. Richard Parkinson, and to double the fees to £10 a term. Although Ainger also carried out all the duties of a parish priest, he had the time and energy to make the reputation of the college grow. Shortly before Ainger's death in 1840 at the age of 55, St Bees College was mentioned specifically in national legislation along with Oxford and Cambridge, Durham and St David's College, Lampeter.

Ainger's successor was the Rev. Richard Buddicom, aged 60, who had quite a different theological standpoint and came from the evangelical wing of the church. He was an early supporter of the Church Missionary Society, and was elected to the newly built chapel of St George's, Everton, in 1813, where he remained until coming to St Bees. He had published a large body of sermons and had a huge reputation as a preacher. When he preached for the first time in Whitehaven, over 3,000 people came to hear him. Although principal, he took very seriously his responsibility for Whitehaven with 20,000 people, which was still part of the ecclesiastical parish of St Bees. Whitehaven had three chapels of ease; Trinity, St James and St Nicholas, each with a curate.

Buddicom died in 1846. His successor was Richard Parkinson, who had been a lecturer at the college until 1833, when he was appointed a Fellow of Manchester Collegiate church (now the cathedral). Under Parkinson College admissions rose, and he set about schemes for improving the college and buildings. He proposed to incorporate the college with a charter, so it could confer degrees, and to build residential accommodation. Parkinson offered to donate £5,000 personally. However, he would not surrender power to a proposed governing council of clergy and laity, and consequently the scheme failed. Had the college progressed in this way, it may well have survived into the 20th century. Instead, Parkinson applied his energies to extending the vicarage and improving the church.

Canon Parkinson died in 1858, and was succeeded by Rev. G. H. Ainger, the son of the first principal, William Ainger. He was to be known as the great builder of the college and restorer of the priory. The college continued to prosper, and during the 1860s annual admissions were frequently over 40. College life seems to have been particularly lively at this time, with many grand celebrations. There was a gala day at the Priory when Ainger was presented with a handsome portrait costing £100. The Militia band played, and a special train was put on from Whitehaven. On another occasion, the anniversary dinner of the college in 1862, no fewer than 25 toasts were proposed, which attracted the criticism of the Whitehaven Temperance Society.

The popularity of the college meant there had to be additional teaching facilities, and in 1863 a new building was completed to the design of William Butterfield, to provide two large lecture rooms. This still stands to the south of the priory and is known as the New College Halls. Ainger was principal until 1871, when he moved to be vicar of Rothbury.

== Decline ==
The new principal was Canon E H Knowles, who had been a mathematics and classics master at St Bees School from 1843 to 1864, then headmaster of Kenilworth Grammar School. He had close ties with the college, having married Revd. G. H. Ainger's sister.

College numbers initially dropped during the 1870s but picked up again in the 1880s, with a maximum yearly intake of 47 in 1883. However, although St Bees College had been a pioneering institution, the rest of the country had caught up. There were now numerous theological colleges modelled on the St Bees example, but mainly in large cities and affiliated in some way to a university. Standards were rising, and in 1893 the bishops of the Church of England agreed that a common entrance exam must be taken before non-graduates could enter a theological college. This dramatically affected the numbers at St Bees as it channelled theological candidates down the graduate route, which St Bees was unable to support. In addition it was still a private institution, and was run at financial risk by the principal. Consequently, Knowles, who was now 75, decided to give notice to close the college in December 1895.

== Legacy ==
St Bees Theological College had a productive and influential life in the history of the Church of England. It trained over 2,600 clergy for the ministry, and had been the model for the new breed of theological colleges. However, the seeds of failure were sown because of its remote geographical position, and the refusal of Parkinson to allow it to come fully under Church management.

== Present-day use of the buildings ==
The closure of the college resulted in three substantial halls becoming available for parochial use. The original lecture room, in the re-roofed monastic chancel, known as the Old College Hall, has had various uses, including as a music room by St Bees School, with which the college has sometimes been confused. It was restored in 2012 and is in regular parish use, and the rehearsal room for the priory choir.

The additional lecture rooms designed by Butterfield became known as the "New College Halls", and the lower hall was for a while a public library. They are now in parochial use for meetings and village organisations.

A few of the college archives survived within the St Bees parish records, now deposited with the Cumbria Archive Service at nearby Whitehaven.

== Principals of St Bees Theological College 1816–1895 ==
- 1816 William Ainger
- 1840 Richard Buddicom
- 1846 Richard Parkinson
- 1857 George Henry Ainger
- 1871 Edward Hadarezer Knowles

== Notable alumni of St Bees ==
- David Anderson, first bishop of Rupert's Land, Canada
- Frederic Hicks Beaven, bishop of Southern Rhodesia
- Charles Bullock, rector and author
- Charles Farrar Forster (before 1873)
- Henry Inman, pioneer of South Australia, rector at North Scarle.
- William Sowerby (1799–1875), the first Anglican clergyman at Goulburn, New South Wales, Australia.
