= List of shipwrecks in July 1844 =

The list of shipwrecks in July 1844 includes ships sunk, foundered, wrecked, grounded, or otherwise lost during July 1844.

== 1 July ==
List of shipwrecks: 1 July 1844
Ship	State	Description
Lord Hill	United Kingdom	The ship ran aground at Bridlington, Yorkshire. She was on a voyage from Bridlington to Sunderland, County Durham. She was refloated the next day and resumed her voyage.

== 2 July ==
List of shipwrecks: 2 July 1844
Ship	State	Description
Eiland	Sweden	The ship ran aground on the Haisborough Sands, in the North Sea off the coast of Norfolk, United Kingdom. She was on a voyage from Gothenburg to Oran, Algeria. She was refloated and put in to Great Yarmouth, Norfolk.

== 5 July ==
List of shipwrecks: 5 July 1844
Ship	State	Description
Sir William Wallace	United Kingdom	The ship was wrecked in the Strait of Belle Isle. Her crew were rescued.

== 6 July ==
List of shipwrecks: 6 July 1844
Ship	State	Description
Cameo	United Kingdom	The ship was lost off Kedgeree, India. She was on a voyage from Liverpool, Lancashire to Calcutta, India.
Elizabeth McDonald	(United Kingdom of Great Britain and Ireland) British North America	The schooner capsized in a squall off Prince Edward Island. Her crew were rescued.

== 7 July ==
List of shipwrecks: 7 July 1844
Ship	State	Description
Brothers	United Kingdom	The sloop ran aground in the Weser. She was on a voyage from Banff to Bremen.
Magdalena Dorothea	Russia	The ship sprang a leak and was beached near "Kukanos". She was on a voyage from Cardiff, Glamorgan, United Kingdom to Saint Petersburg.
Marshal Blucher	United Kingdom	The ship foundered in the Atlantic Ocean off the coast of Portugal. She was on a voyage from Lisbon to Falmouth, Cornwall. She was subsequently driven ashore and wrecked at Lisbon.

== 8 July ==
List of shipwrecks: 8 July 1844
Ship	State	Description
Ann	United Kingdom	The ship ran aground in the Danube upstream of "Beni".
Hannah	United Kingdom	The brig was abandoned in the Atlantic Ocean. Her crew were rescued by Scotland (United Kingdom).

== 9 July ==
List of shipwrecks: 9 July 1844
Ship	State	Description
Commercial	United Kingdom	The ship sprang a leak whilst on a voyage from South Shields, County Durham to Saint Petersburg, Russia. She put back to South Shields and was beached.
Vintage	United Kingdom	The ship struck rocks between Cullercoats and Tynemouth, Northumberland. She was on a voyage from Clackmannan to London. She was refloated and put in to South Shields. Subsequently repaired at North Shields.

== 11 July ==
List of shipwrecks: 11 July 1844
Ship	State	Description
Ayrshire	United Kingdom	The barque was beached on La Gomera, Canary Islands in a capsized condition. She became a wreck on 13 November.
Bon Père	France	The sloop ran aground off the Bout du Nez, on the Channel coast.
Eliza and Mary	United Kingdom	The ship ran aground in Pistolet Bay and was severely damaged. She was refloated the next day. Eliza and Mary was consequently condemned.
Robert Watts	United Kingdom	The ship ran aground off the coast of Sierra Leone.
Viscountess Canning	United Kingdom	The ship was driven ashore on the coast of Sierra Leone.

== 12 July ==
List of shipwrecks: 12 July 1844
Ship	State	Description
Patterson	(United Kingdom of Great Britain and Ireland) New South Wales	The schooner was driven ashore in the Richmond River. She was on a voyage from the Richmond River to Sydney.
Springflower	United Kingdom	The ship was driven ashore and damaged at Boscastle, Cornwall. She was refloated and taken in to Boscastle.

== 13 July ==
List of shipwrecks: 13 July 1844
Ship	State	Description
Isabella	United Kingdom	The ship was driven ashore at Redcar, Yorkshire. She was refloated and resumed her voyage.
Monica	United Kingdom	The ship was driven ashore at Redcar. She was refloated and resumed her voyage.

== 14 July ==
List of shipwrecks: 14 July 1844
Ship	State	Description
Alabama	United States	The ship ran aground off the Cordouan Lighthouse, Gironde, France. She was on a voyage from New Orleans, Louisiana to Bordeaux, Gironde.
Demouth	Greifswald	The ship was in collision with Hoseana (Hamburg) and foundered off Rendsburg, Duchy of Schleswig. She was on a voyage from Greifswald to an English port. Demouth was refloated on 27 July and taken in to Rendsburg.
Singapore	United Kingdom	The brig was driven ashore and wrecked 4 nautical miles (7.4 km) east of Rye, Sussex. Her crew were rescued by the fishing smack British Rover (United Kingdom). Singapore was on a voyage from Quebec City, Province of Canada, British North America to London.
Spence	United Kingdom	The West Indiaman was run aground and wrecked near Malin Head, County Donegal. Her crew were rescued. She was on a voyage from Trinidad to Londonderry.

== 15 July ==
List of shipwrecks: 15 July 1844
Ship	State	Description
Bourbonnais	France	The ship ran aground off Tahiti. She was towed off but consequently sank, Her crew were rescued.
Deux Frères	France	The schooner was wrecked on Agaléga, Mauritius. Her crew survived.
Ironsides	United Kingdom	The ship capsized at Pernambuco, Brazil. She was later righted.

== 16 July ==
List of shipwrecks: 16 July 1844
Ship	State	Description
Nostros Patrios	Spain	The ship was wrecked in the Bahamas. She was on a voyage from Barcelona to Havana, Cuba.

== 18 July ==
List of shipwrecks: 18 July 1844
Ship	State	Description
Phœnix	United Kingdom	The ship was driven ashore at Huna, Caithness. She was on a voyage from Montrose, Forfarshire to Liverpool, Lancashire. She was refloated and resumed her voyage.

== 20 July ==
List of shipwrecks: 20 July 1844
Ship	State	Description
John o'Gaunt	United Kingdom	John o'Gaunt (right). The barque was sunk off Brighton, Sussex in an experiment by Captain Warner using his "invisible shells".
Lady of the Isles	United Kingdom	The ship was driven ashore at Margate, Kent. She was on a voyage from London to Bideford, Devon. She was refloated and resumed her voyage.
Orion	United Kingdom	The barque was wrecked 150 nautical miles (280 km) north of Ichaboe Island, Portuguese West Africa. Her sixteen crew were rescued by a cutter from HMS Isis (Royal Navy).

== 21 July ==
List of shipwrecks: 21 July 1844
Ship	State	Description
Lord Ashburton	United Kingdom	The barque was driven ashore and wrecked at Strangford, County Antrim. Her crew were rescued. She was on a voyage from Liverpool, Lancashire to Saint John, New Brunswick, British North America. She was refloated on 31 August and beached at Portaferry, County Down. Subsequently sold and towed to Liverpool for repairs.
Storfursten	Sweden	The steamship ran aground off Helsinki, Grand Duchy of Finland. She was on a voyage from Stockholm to Turku, Grand Duchy of Finland, Reval and Saint Petersburg, Russia. She was refloated and taken in to Turku for repairs.
William Thompson	United Kingdom	The ship ran aground on the Gunfleet Sand, in the North Sea off the coast of Essex. She was on a voyage from Sunderland, County Durham to London. She was refloated.

== 22 July ==
List of shipwrecks: 22 July 1844
Ship	State	Description
Pandora	United Kingdom	The ship capsized in the Atlantic Ocean. Her crew were rescued by Isabella (United Kingdom). Pandora was on a voyage from Saint John, New Brunswick, British North America to Waterford.
St. George	United Kingdom	The ship ran aground and sank at "Ristrow". She was on a voyage from Quebec City, Province of Canada, British North America to Maryport, Cumberland.

== 23 July ==
List of shipwrecks: 23 July 1844
Ship	State	Description
Elisabeth and Antoinette	Netherlands	The ship ran aground on the Goodwin Sands, Kent, United Kingdom. She was on a voyage from Amsterdam, North Holland to Batavia, Netherlands East Indies. She was refloated and taken in to The Downs, and later to Gravesend, Kent.
George Ponsonby	United Kingdom	The ship foundered off Colonsay, Inner Hebrides. Her crew survived. She was on a voyage from Arklow, County Wicklow to Newcastle upon Tyne, Northumberland.
Susanna Wilhelmine	Danzig	The ship was driven ashore at Hela, Prussia. Her crew were rescued. She was on a voyage from Danzig to Leith, Lothian, United Kingdom. She was consequently condemned.

== 24 July ==
List of shipwrecks: 24 July 1844
Ship	State	Description
Juno	United Kingdom	The ship ran aground on the Spaniard Sand, in the North Sea off the coast of Kent. She was on a voyage from London to a Baltic port. She was refloated and taken in to Sheerness, Kent for repairs.
Orange	United Kingdom	The schooner capsized whilst on a voyage from Jamaica to Matanzas, Cuba. Her seven crew were rescued on 6 August by Vicksburg (United States) but one of them died that day.
Robert Napier	United Kingdom	The paddle steamer caught fire and was beached at Ballycastle, County Antrim. All on board were rescued. She was on a voyage from Londonderry to Liverpool, Lancashire. Subsequently repaired.

== 25 July ==
List of shipwrecks: 25 July 1844
Ship	State	Description
Henrik Johann	Lübeck	The ship was driven ashore and wrecked at Snogebæk, Denmark. Her crew were rescued. She was on a voyage from Lübeck to Uusikaupunki, Grand Duchy of Finland.
Naiade	United Kingdom	The brig ran aground on Stroma, Caithness. She was on a voyage from Sunderland, County Durham to Quebec City, Province of Canada, British North America. Naiade was refloated and taken in to Stromness, Orkney Islands.
Premier	United Kingdom	The East Indiaman was wrecked on Pulo Pajang, off the east coast of Borneo. All on board survived, but were taken prisoner. She was on a voyage from Hong Kong to "Bally Badong".

== 26 July ==
List of shipwrecks: 26 July 1844
Ship	State	Description
Bessy	(United Kingdom of Great Britain and Ireland) New South Wales	The schooner was wrecked in Anna Bay. Her crew survived.
Collins	United Kingdom	The ship ran aground off Havre de Grâce, Seine-Inférieure, France. She was later refloated.
Royal Admiral	United Kingdom	The East Indiaman, a barque, was wrecked at Bombay, India. She was on a voyage from Newport, Monmouthshire to Aden.
Victoria	United Kingdom	The ship ran aground off Havre de Grâce. She was later refloated.
Violet	United Kingdom	The ship ran aground off Havre de Grâce. She was later refloated.

== 27 July ==
List of shipwrecks: 27 July 1844
Ship	State	Description
Indian	United Kingdom	The ship was driven ashore at Pointe-aux-Trembles, Province of Canada, British North America. She was on a voyage from Montreal, Province of Canada to London. She was refloated on 28 July and resumed her voyage.

== 28 July ==
List of shipwrecks: 28 July 1844
Ship	State	Description
Duke of Clarence	United Kingdom	The ship was driven asher at Coalhouse Point, Kent. She was on a voyage from Danzig to Rochester, Kent. She was refloated the next day and taken in to Rochester.

== 30 July ==
List of shipwrecks: 30 July 1844
Ship	State	Description
Emerald	United Kingdom	The ship ran aground off Byrum, Denmark. She was on a voyage from Riga, Russia to Liverpool, Lancashire. She was refloated and resumed her voyage.
Mary	United Kingdom	The ship was driven ashore and wrecked at Port Gaverne, Cornwall.
Sarah	United Kingdom	The ship ran aground on the "Dronoroe Bank". She was on a voyage from Waterford to London. She was later refloated and resumed her voyage.
Trio	United Kingdom	The sloop was driven ashore and severely damaged at Trebarwith, Cornwall.
William Watson	United Kingdom	The brig sprang a leak and foundered in the Baltic Sea. One crew member was rescued by a Norwegian fishing smack. She was on a voyage from Riga to London.

== 31 July ==
List of shipwrecks: 31 July 1844
Ship	State	Description
Charles Phillips	United Kingdom	The ship was severely damaged at Porth-carn-hun, Cornwall.
Louisa	United Kingdom	The ship was severely damaged at Porth-carn-hun.
Pomona	United Kingdom	The ship was driven ashore on Oyster Island. She was on a voyage from Quebec City. Province of Canada, British North America to Sligo. She was refloated on 13 August and beached.
Robert and Ann	United Kingdom	The schooner was wrecked on Cap Spartel, Morocco. Her crew were rescued. She was on a voyage from Stockton-on-Tees, County Durham to Messina, Sicily.
Samuel & Elizabeth	United Kingdom	The ship was severely damaged at Porth-carn-hun.
Syren	United Kingdom	The schooner was wrecked at Cap Spartel. Her crew were rescued.
Temperance	United Kingdom	The ship was severely damaged at Porth-carn-hun.

== Unknown date ==
List of shipwrecks: Unknown date in July 1844
Ship	State	Description
Cervantes	United States	The whaler, a barque, was wrecked in Jurien Bay before 8 July.
Coronation	United Kingdom	The schooner ran aground on the Gunfleet Sand, in the North Sea off the coast of Essex. She was refloated and assisted into Harwich, Essex.
Desdemona	(United Kingdom of Great Britain and Ireland) British North America	The ship was driven ashore and wrecked at Arichat, Nova Scotia between 2 and 16 July. She was on a voyage from Pictou, Nova Scotia to Somerset, Massachusetts, United States.
Diana	United Kingdom	The ship was wrecked on Sanda Island. The wreck was towed in to Girvan, Ayrshire on 15 July.
Graf von Blucher	United Kingdom	The ship was lost near Montevideo, Uruguay before 25 July.
Hannah	United Kingdom	The brig was abandoned off Anticosti Island, Nova Scotia, British North America between 4 and 6 July. Her captain remained on board; he was rescued the next day by Catherine (United Kingdom).
Industrie	Russia	The ship was driven ashore near Büyükdere, Ottoman Empire before 16 July.
James	(United Kingdom of Great Britain and Ireland) New Zealand	The schooner was driven ashore by a southerly gale and wrecked in Palliser Bay on or about 8 July with the loss of two of her crew.
Judith	United Kingdom	The schooner was struck by lightning and foundered in the Atlantic Ocean. She was on a voyage from Bristol, Gloucestershire to Loanda, Brazil.
Liberty	United Kingdom	The ship was driven ashore on Gotland, Sweden. She was on a voyage from Vyborg, Sweden to Newcastle upon Tyne, Northumberland. She was refloated and put in to Christiansø, Denmark, where she arrived on 23 July in a sinking condition.
Lord Ashburton	United Kingdom	The ship was driven ashore near Strangford, County Antrim. She was on a voyage from Liverpool, Lancashire to Saint John, New Brunswick.
Louis XIV	France	The ship ran aground on the Indian Key. She was on later refloated and taken in to Key West, Florida Territory. She was consequently condemned.
Madras	United Kingdom	The barque caught fire and was scuttled in the River Thames at Deptford, Kent before 13 July.
Pontefract	United Kingdom	The ship was wrecked at Conway Inlet, Prince Edward Island, British North America before 30 July. She was on a voyage from Oran, French Algeria to Miramichi, New Brunswick, British North Americe.
Portland	United Kingdom	The barque capsized at Cienfuegos, Cuba before 7 July.
Royal Admiral	United Kingdom	The ship was wrecked near the Colaba Lighthouse, Bombay, India before 31 July. She was on a voyage from Newport, Monmouthshire to Aden.
Sir Lionel Smith	United Kingdom	The brig capsized in the Atlantic Ocean in a hurricane before 21 July. Her crew were rescued by Erie (United States). Sir Lionel Smith was on a voyage from New York to Montego Bay, Jamaica.
Tay	United Kingdom	The steamship ran aground on the Colorados. She was on a voyage from Jamaica to Havana, Cuba. She was refloated with assistance from the schooner Lee and steamship Congress (both United Kingdom) and taken in to Havana in a leaky condition.
Vladimir	Austrian Empire	The ship was lost in the Dardanelles.
Wasp	United Kingdom	The ship was driven ashore south of Kronstadt, Russia. She was on a voyage from London to Saint Petersburg, Russia. She was refloated on 14 July.
