= Charles Bullock =

Charles Bullock may refer to:

- Charles Bullock (rector) (1829–1911), British parish priest and author
- Charles J. Bullock (1869–1941), American economist
- Charles S. Bullock III (born 1942), American political scientist
- Chick Bullock (1898–1981), American jazz bandleader
