= William Sowerby =

William Sowerby may refer to:

- William Sowerby (clergyman)
- William Sowerby (politician)
