= Ronald Moon (priest) =

Australian Anglican priest (1932–2011)

Ronald Earl Moon (5 May 1932 – 15 September 2011) was an Australian Anglican priest who was an archdeacon and a cathedral dean in the 20th century.

Moon was educated at St John's College, Morpeth, and ordained both deacon and priest in 1956. After a curacy in Tumut (1956–57), he was the incumbent at Tarcutta from 1957 to 1963 and then of Binda (1963–66). He was then a field officer for the Anglican Diocese of Canberra and Goulburn from 1966 until 1970; and Rector of Cootamundra from 1971 to 1980. He then served at All Saints, Ainslie, Dubbo and Braidwood, and was then Dean of St Saviour's Cathedral, Goulburn, (1986–92). He was Archdeacon of Barker from 1992 to 1996.
