= Mesac Thomas =

Anglican bishop in Australia

The Right Reverend Mesac Thomas (10 May 1816 – 15 March 1892) was an Anglican bishop in Australia.

Thomas was born in Aberystwyth, Ceredigion (Cardiganshire), Wales, to Welsh parents: his father was a John Thomas of Shrewsbury; and his mother was Elizabeth, née Williams (daughter of Edward Williams, of Llwynyrhedydd). He was educated at Oswestry School, Shrewsbury and Trinity College, Cambridge, where he graduated B.A. in 1840 and M.A. in 1843. Ordained in 1840, he was a Curate at Bishop Ryder Church, Birmingham before holding incumbencies at Tuddenham and Attleborough.

In 1851 he became Secretary of the Colonial Church and School Society, a post he held for twelve years until his consecration as the inaugural Bishop of Goulburn in 1863. Thomas was consecrated on 25 March 1863 and installed on 8 April 1864. During his long incumbency he travelled widely within his diocese and oversaw the completion of the diocese's cathedral and a home for its future bishops. Bishop Thomas married on 7 November 1843 Mary Campbell Hasluck, the second daughter of Thomas Hinton Hasluck, of Handsworth, near Birmingham.

== Death ==
Thomas died at Bishopthorpe Manor in Goulburn, New South Wales, Australia on 15 March 1892 aged 75. In March 1892 his death (in office) was announced in British newspapers.

Church of England titles
New diocese	Bishop of Goulburn; 1863–1892	Succeeded by William Chalmers
