= William Chalmers (bishop) =

Anglican bishop in Australia

William Chalmers (1833 – 13 November 1901) was a missionary who became an Anglican bishop in Australia.

== Early life and education ==
Chalmers was born in London in 1833, the son of George Chalmers of Islington. He was educated at the High School of Dundee and at St Augustine's College, Canterbury. He later qualified for the degree of B.D. from Trinity College, Toronto in 1888, and received an honorary Doctor of Divinity (DD) degree from the college in 1892. He was also an honorary fellow of St Augustine's College, Canterbury.

== Ecclesiastical career ==
On leaving college in 1858, he was accepted by the Society for the Propagation of the Gospel for service in the Diocese of Labuan and Sarawak. He was admitted to the diaconate in 1858, and ordained in 1859, working as an SPG missionary, the first amongst the Land Dayaks of Sarawak. Health problems led to his emigrating to Victoria, Australia in 1861. He held incumbencies at Inglewood (1862–68), Malmsbury and Taradale (1868–70), Kyneton (1870–78), Geelong (1878–89) and Brighton, Melbourne, where he served as Vicar of St Andrew's Church (1889–92). In 1889 he was also appointed a Canon of Melbourne Cathedral.

Chalmers was elected to be the Bishop of Goulburn on 9 June 1892 and consecrated and installed on 1 November.

He died in office in Sydney in 1901 and is buried within the precincts of St Saviour's Cathedral, Goulburn.

== Family ==
Chalmers married, on 25 September 1866, a daughter of Mr. G. N. Francis, of Tarnagulla, Victoria.

Church of England titles
Preceded by Mesac Thomas	Bishop of Goulburn; 1892–1901	Succeeded by Christopher Barlow
