= Little Maplestead =

Village in Essex, England

Coordinates: 51.9748°N 0.6546°E

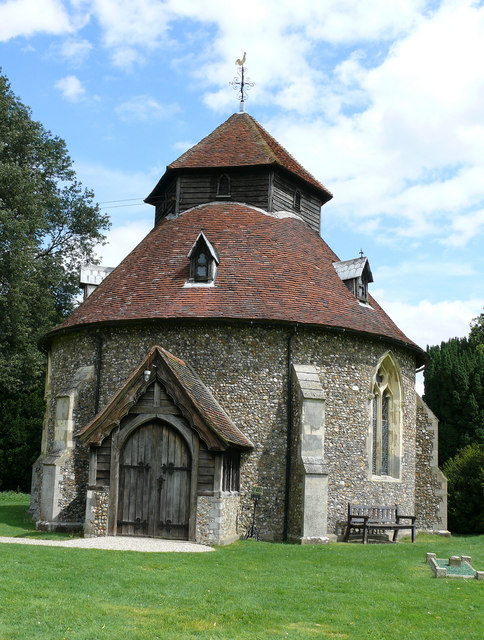
- Church of St John the Baptist

- Location within Essex
- Population: 257 (Parish, 2021)
- OS grid reference: TL8234
- Civil parish: Little Maplestead
- District: Braintree
- Shire county: Essex
- Region: East
- Country: England
- Sovereign state: United Kingdom
- Post town: HALSTEAD
- Postcode district: CO9
- Dialling code: 01787
- Police: Essex
- Fire: Essex
- Ambulance: East of England
- UK Parliament: Braintree

Little Maplestead is a village and civil parish in the Braintree district of Essex, England. At the 2021 census the parish had a population of 257.

== Amenities ==
Little Maplestead once had a Knights Hospitaller establishment called Little Maplestead Preceptory.

The round parish church, dedicated to St John the Baptist, is one of only four medieval round churches in England now surviving. It was built by the Knights Hospitallers. The circular nave has an arcade of six bays. The church dates from around 1335 but was practically rebuilt 1849–55. The church is a Grade II* listed building.

Much restoration took place in the 1850s, but the original design and composition of the rotunda that forms the nave remains, as do many of the earlier fittings. In March 2013 the church was granted £5,000 by the National Churches Trust, as part of a restoration fundraising effort with a target of £100,000, of which £42,000 had been raised.

In 1836, William Wallen published The History and Antiquities of the Round Church at Little Maplestead, Essex.

On the first Sunday in June, the Order of St John in Essex hold an annual service, where Knights and other officials of The Order from the county process in their formal mantels (ceremonial cloaks).

== Notable people ==
Little Maplestead is the home of X Factor 2010 winner Matt Cardle, actress Barbara Hicks, and former World and European Bridge Champion David Price.
