= William Wallen (architect, born 1807) =

British architect

William Wallen FSA (1807–1888) was an English architect who practised in London and Huddersfield, Yorkshire. He was also a campaigner for better architectural education and professional status.

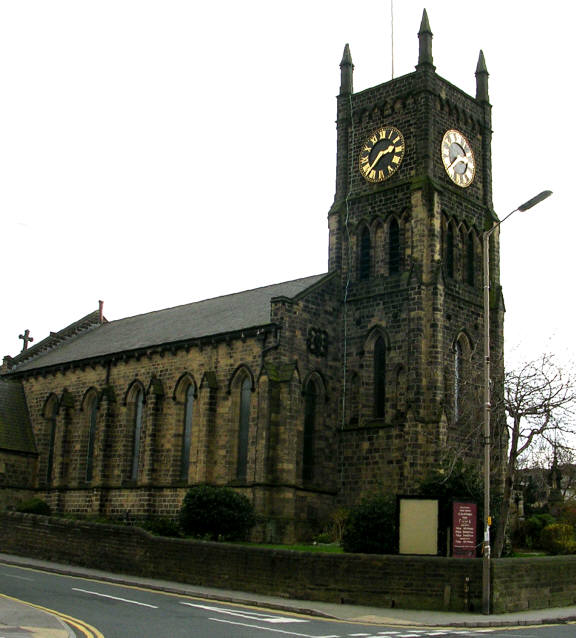
St John's Church, Farsley, designed by William Wallen, built in 1842.

== Biography ==
William Wallen, the son of John Wallen (1785–1865) and Maria Adams (1780–1825) was baptised at St. Marys, Stepney in 1807. William received architectural training from his father. In 1830, William married Frances Gill (1802–1895) and the following year, their son, William Sowerby Wallen, was baptised at Whitechapel, London. They lived with John Wallen's extended family in various homes in and around Norton Folgate, London. In 1838, William moved his practice to Huddersfield, Yorkshire. Frances had been born in nearby Notton, therefore, family connections may have influenced this move. By 1851, William, Frances, their son, William Sowerby and niece, Julia Gill, were living at 61 New North Rd, Huddersfield.

During 1853, William ceased to practice and it was later assumed by most historians that he had died. Statements made by civic leaders at this point in time indicate that William was highly regarded in both Huddersfield and within architectural circles; therefore, it is probable that his fate was not openly discussed. In reality, William was admitted to the Bootham Lunatic Hospital in September 1853 and remained a patient there until his death in 1888, aged 81 years. The exact nature of William's condition is not recorded; however, he apparently retained his research and communication skills. In 1871, taking part in Bootham's regular ‘programme of entertainments’ he delivered a lecture to his fellow inmates entitled, An Analysis of the Franco-Prussian War.

Frances supported herself as a schoolteacher; she died, aged 93, in Leeds. William Sowerby Wallen (1831–1870), became a Surgeon, practicing in Rotherhithe and also serving as Vice Surgeon to the 23rd Surrey Rifle Volunteer Corps. He died in Natal, South Africa.

== Architectural career ==
William Wallen received comprehensive tutelage in the office of his father, John Wallen, who was an Architect and the Principal Surveyor in London in the 1830s. William probably completed his training in 1828; however, there is no evidence that he undertook any independent projects during the following ten years. By 1831, John Wallen, William Wallen and William Beatson had formed a partnership that remained intact until 1836, when the firm ‘Wallen, Son and Beatson’ provided a substantial estimate for repairs to the fire damaged Christ Church in Spitalfields. On 24 March 1836, by mutual consent, Beatson withdrew from the partnership. During the partnership, William appears to have gained some autonomy allowing him to also pursue his antiquarian and educational interests. In 1838, he appeared in Huddersfield, Yorkshire, becoming the town's only qualified architect. William's career flourished. His many projects included the building of six new churches:

- 1838–40, St David, Holmbridge, near Huddersfield
- 1842-3 St John the Evangelist Church, Farsley, Bradford
- 1843-5 St Luke's Church, Milnsbridge, Huddersfield,
- 1844–6 Christ Church, Oakworth, Keighley,
- 1845-7 St Nicholas, Whitehaven, Cumbria (Cumberland).
- 1845-8 St Paul's Church, Shepley, Huddersfield.

Other Projects:

- 1840 Report for Clarke-Thornhill family re. condition of roofs at Fixby Hall
- 1843 National School and Master's House, Kirkheaton.
- 1846 Riding School, Huddersfield.
- 1848 Longley Hall Estate Office.
- 1849 George Hotel, Huddersfield. (William Wallen and Charles Child)
- 1851 Castle Hill Hotel.
- 1852 Restoration of Holme Bridge Church.
- 1853 Lecture Room, Aspley. This was Wallen's last project. He did not see its completion in 1854.

The Italianate façade of the George Hotel became Huddersfield's adopted architectural style as the town developed over following decade. Charles Child's role in the George Hotel project is disputed, being variously described as Wallen's clerk, contractor or contributing architect. Child completed the Aspley Lecture Room.

== Art and publication ==
Between 1828 and 1833 William Wallen exhibited artwork at the Royal Academy, London. Unlike other exhibiting architects, William described himself as a ‘painter’. His exhibits included several depictions medieval buildings, Dover Castle and four views being part of a series depicting the demolition of old London Bridge.

In 1836, William published The History and Antiquities of the Round Church at Little Maplestead, Essex. His work was dedicated to Rev. William Sowerby, Curate of St. Bridgets, Beckermet, Cumberland and was supported by 510 subscribers including several notable architects. A review, published in J.C. Loudon's Architectural Magazine(1836), considered the work to have little value from an architectural point of view. Nevertheless, the reviewer declared that Wallen's extensive topographical history and account of the Crusades were “both instructive and entertaining”. Contemporary historians suggest that Wallen's Little Maplestead has considerable antiquarian merit.

== Contributions to the architectural profession ==
Wallen had a close association with fellow architects, Edward Cresy (1792–1858) and George Ledwell Taylor (1888–1873). They would have shared an interest in professional groups such as the Architectural Society that were developing in the 1830s. In 1834, Cresy and Taylor were founding members of the Institute of British Architects (IBA) which later became the RIBA. With Cresy and Taylor as referees, Wallen became a fellow of the Society of Antiquaries, in 1835. These fledgling institutes were fertile ground for the ‘Battle of the Styles’ of the Victorian era, when Gothic and Classical architectural styles were selectively celebrated or reviled. Cresy resigned from the IBA soon after its inception, lamenting the opprobrium that was pervading his profession: “I laid the foundations with my friend Wallen for a society of men who would act in concert”. Wallen concurred with Cresy's sentiments in his lecture On Prejudice as to Style in Architecture, delivered to the Architectural Society in January 1838. Wallen mocked the prejudice and animosity pervading the architectural profession, encapsulating this absurdity in the following line: “the rose is a beautiful flower, but as a lily is not LIKE a rose, it is not beautiful”. This factionalism may have motivated Wallen to move to Huddersfield. Undaunted, he established the Yorkshire Architectural Society and remained an active member during the 1840s.
