= Barbara Hicks =

English film actress (1924–2013)

- Born: 12 August 1924; Wolverhampton, Staffordshire, England
- Died: 6 September 2013 (aged 89); Little Maplestead, Essex, England
- Occupation: Actress
- Years active: 1948—2000

Barbara Hicks (12 August 1924 – 6 September 2013) was an English film actress. She appeared in Terry Gilliam's 1985 cult film Brazil and Merchant Ivory Productions's 1992 Bafta award-winning Howards End.

== Biography ==
Hicks was born in Wolverhampton, Staffordshire, and lived at Little Maplestead, Essex. She was educated at Adcote School, Shropshire. After training at the Webber Douglas School of Dramatic Art, she made her first appearance on stage in 1948 at the Royal Court, Liverpool in Leo Marks’ Written for a Lady, which transferred to the Garrick Theatre, and became her West End debut.

She was married for 40 years to Lieutenant Colonel Peter Taylor (25 January 1913 – 26 March 2010). He was an outstanding front line commander who won two MCs serving with the 2/6th Bn Queen's Royal Regiment (West Surrey) in Italy in 1944.

Hicks appeared in Happy Birthday, Sir Larry, a National Theatre birthday tribute to Laurence Olivier, on 31 May 1987 in the presence of Olivier.

She was the mother of actor Giles Taylor.

== Filmography ==
Year	Title	Role	Notes
1953	Background	Mrs. Young	
1954	Conflict of Wings	Mrs. Thompson	
1954	Child's Play	Policewoman	
1956	Sailor Beware!	Little Girl's Mother	
1958	I Was Monty's Double	Hester	
1958	Nowhere to Go	Agnes the maid	uncredited
1959	Operation Bullshine	Sergeant Merrifield	
1960	A Touch of Larceny	Miss Price	uncredited
1961	His and Hers	Woman	
1961	Hand in Hand	Miss Roberts	
1961	A Matter of WHO	Margery	uncredited
1961	Petticoat Pirates	Physical Training Instructor	
1963	Doctor in Distress	Health Farm Receptionist	uncredited
1964	Smokescreen	Miss Breen	
1964	The Third Secret	Police Secretary	
1968	The Charge of the Light Brigade	Mrs. Duberly's maid	
1978	Death on the Nile	Village schoolmistress	uncredited
1980	The Wildcats of St Trinian's	Miss Coke	
1981	Memoirs of a Survivor	Woman on Waste Ground	
1982	Evil Under the Sun	Flewitt's Secretary	
1982	Britannia Hospital	Miss Tinker: Administration	
1982	A Shocking Accident	Aunt Joyce	
1983	Dombey and Son	Mrs. Pipchin	
1985	Brazil	Mrs. Alma Terrain	
1985	Morons from Outer Space	Stenographer	
1985	Cover Her Face	Miss Molpass	
1986	The Murder at the Vicarage	Miss Hartnell	
1988	We Think the World of You	Residents Assoc. Lady 1	
1989	Wilt	Ms Clinch	
1990	Press Gang	Virginia Hume	1 episode
1990	The Witches	Regina	uncredited
1992	Howards End	Miss Avery	
1992	Orlando	Second Older Woman	
1992	L'accompagnatrice		
1992	The Mirror Crack'd from Side to Side	Miss Hartnell	
1994	The Memoirs of Sherlock Holmes	Emily Garrideb	
1997	Remember Me?	Elderly sister	
1997	FairyTale: A True Story	City Woman	
1997	Déjà Vu	Housekeeper	
2000	Up at the Villa	Lulu Good	final film role
