= St Saviour's Cathedral, Goulburn =

Coordinates: 34°45′11″S 149°42′57″E

St Saviour's Cathedral
- Cathedral Church of Saint Saviour
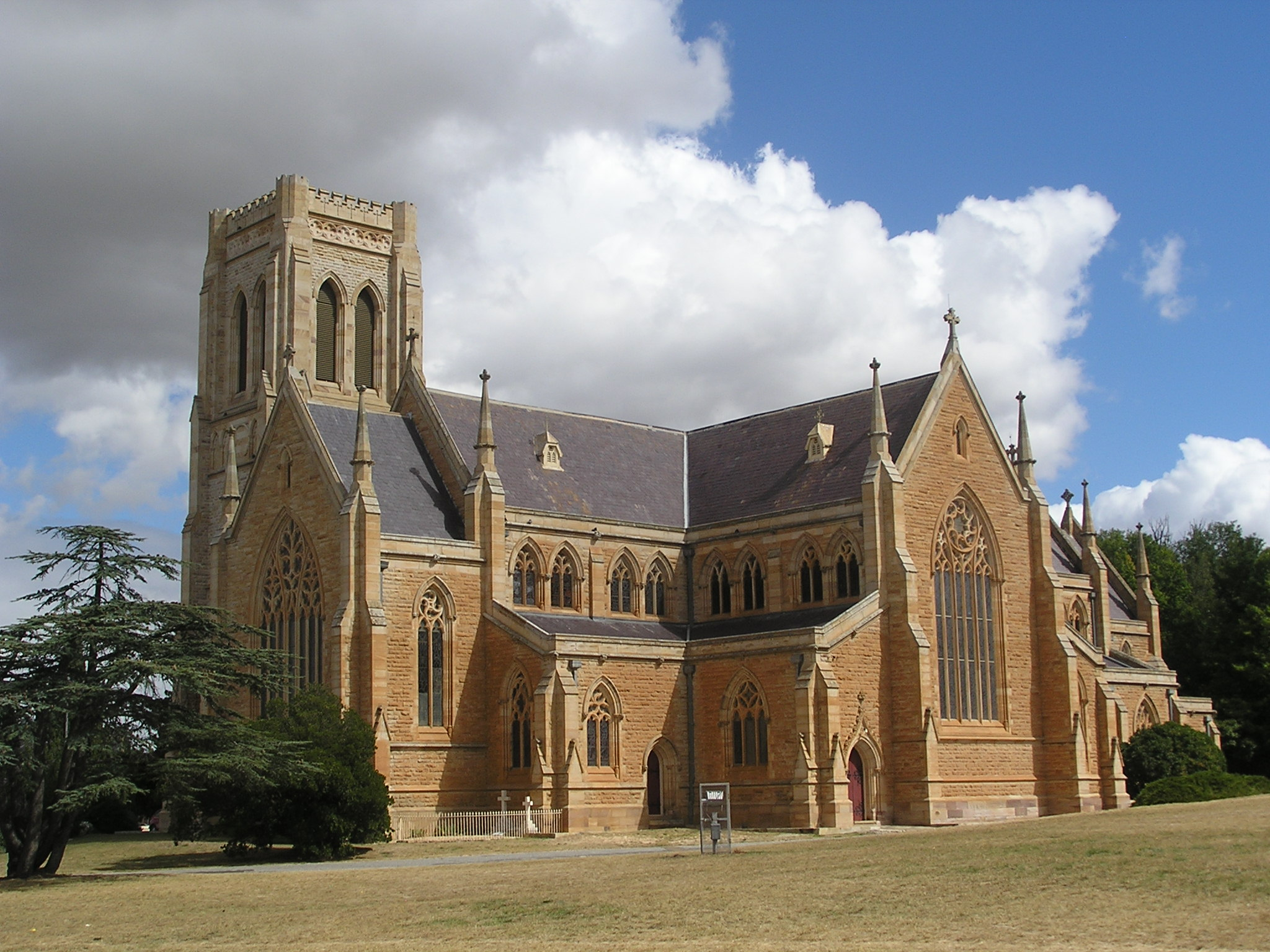

- Location in New South Wales
- Location: 170 Bourke Street, Goulburn, New South Wales
- Country: Australia
- Denomination: Anglican Church of Australia
- Website: goulburncathedral.org.au

History
- Former name: Church of Saint Saviour
- Status: Cathedral
- Founded: 14 January 1874
- Founder: Mesac Thomas
- Dedication: Jesus in his title of Saviour
- Dedicated: 1884

Architecture
- Functional status: Active
- Architects: Edmund Blacket (1817–1883); Cyril Blacket (1857–1937); Arthur Blacket (1848–1928)
- Architectural type: Victorian Revival
- Years built: 1874–1884

Specifications
- Length: 45.7 metres (150 ft)
- Width: 16.4 metres (54 ft)
- Materials: Pyrmont sandstone; Slate roofing

Administration
- Province: New South Wales
- Diocese: Canberra and Goulburn

Clergy
- Dean: Gavin Krebs

New South Wales Heritage Register
- Official name: St Saviour's Cathedral
- Type: Built
- Criteria: a., b., c., d., e., f., g.
- Designated: 20 April 2009
- Reference no.: 01798

St Saviour's Cathedral is an Australian Anglican cathedral. It is the cathedral church of the Anglican Diocese of Canberra and Goulburn in Goulburn, New South Wales. The cathedral is dedicated to Jesus in his title of Saviour. The current dean is the Very Reverend Gavin Krebs. It was added to the New South Wales State Heritage Register on 20 April 2009.

== History ==
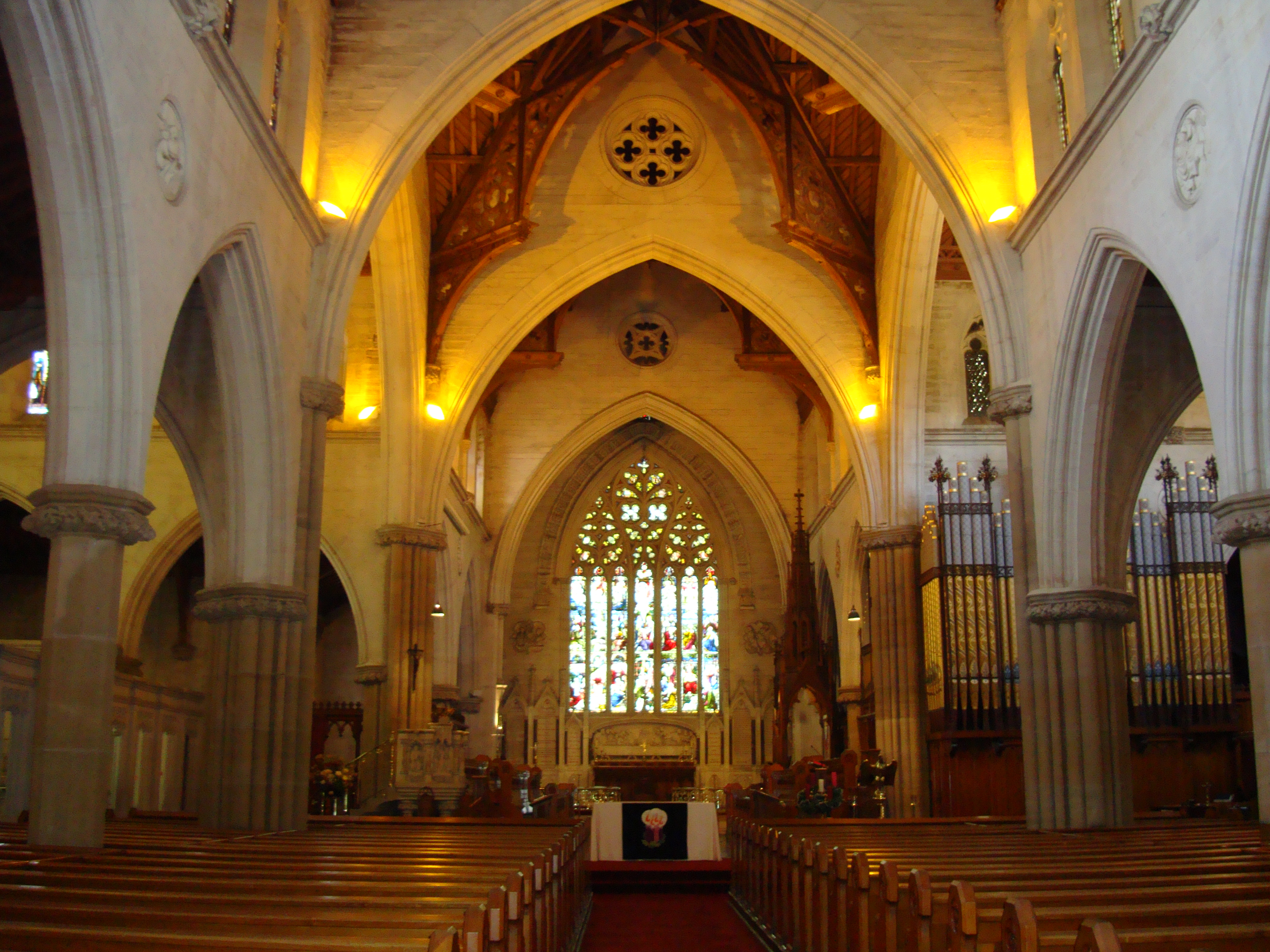
Cathedral interior

In 1840 a simple brick church to the designs of a Sydney architect, James Hume, was erected. This Church of Saint Saviour was in the manner of English parish churches with a bold square western tower and a simple axiality complementing the Georgian town plan. Built by James Wilson, a convict arriving in the colony aboard the Lord Sidmouth in 1819, and his relation Henry Wilson, the foundation stones were obtained from the quarries known as Munoz's on Church Hill. James Wilson died during construction of the church after falling from the roof. A painting of the original church hangs in the narthex of the current cathedral.

By the early 1860s, when the Diocese of Sydney could not functionally minister to the Goulburn area, it was decided that the Diocese of Goulburn should be created. Accordingly, Bishop Mesac Thomas was consecrated in 1861 and the need for a cathedral church came to be considered. When the brick church was taken down the bricks were reused in the floor of the current cathedral.

== Construction ==
=== Cathedral ===
It was not until 1871 that cathedral plans came to be actively considered. Three years later, on 15 January 1874, the foundation stone of the cathedral church was laid. The Cathedral Church of Saint Saviour was designed by Edmund Blacket, a noted Colonial ecclesiastical architect. Blacket had already had some involvement with the church site at Goulburn. In 1843 he had designed a pulpit for James Hume's original brick church which was approved by Bishop Broughton and then installed.

Since Blacket's cathedral was to take 10 years to construct, Blacket was also asked to design a smaller pro-cathedral and parish Sunday school. This building was completed in 1874 and still stands within the cathedral precinct, to the west of the cathedral itself. The first Anglican church, St Saviour's, was completed in 1839 and this later became the pro-cathedral. The first resident Anglican priest of that church was William Sowerby, who had been trained at St Bees Theological College in Cumberland, England, and moved to Australia in 1836 to answer the call for more clergy. Sowerby later became the first dean of St Saviour's.

The Blacket cathedral is one of the architect's more notable works. It was the only cathedral he designed unencumbered by distance, financial stringency and unsympathetic clients. It was a favourite building and Blacket spent much of the last nine years of his life working on it. Blacket gave to the cathedral a crucifix which he had carved in his youth; a controversial gift which the authorities hid away for many years. The cathedral is unmistakably a Blacket church, on a grand scale, with nave, aisles, transepts, chancel, porches and tower. It has large and elaborate stone traceried windows and an interior with a heavily carved hammer beam roof, clustered columns and foliage capitals, elaborately moulded arcades and chancel arch and the use of figurative roundels in the nave, transepts and chancel. The tower and spire, however, were never completed. The cathedral cost 20,000 pounds at the time of its completion in 1884.

Many attempts were made subsequent to Blacket's death in 1883 and the completion of the cathedral proper one year later; to complete the cathedral's tower and spire but all these attempts were to no avail. In 1909, Edmund's son Cyril prepared documents for the completion of the tower and spire. A commemorative stone was even laid within the tower base to signal recommencement of the tower building but nothing more was done. In the 1920s, a Melbourne architect, Louis A. Williams, was asked to advise the diocese on the state of the tower footings. He reported that "as a result of my examination of the structure and [Blacket] drawings, I can assure you that the present tower stump and footings are of ample strength to bear the proposed superstructure." Still no further work was undertaken.

Some ten years later, Williams and a Sydney architect, Sir Charles Rosenthal, produced a joint scheme for the new cathedral tower and spire. Again, however, no work issued from all this activity. Perhaps this inactivity resulted from particularly pessimistic analyses of the tower foundations to carry the weight of the building. The stringencies imposed by World War Il also dampened enthusiasm and restricted available monies. It was not until 1984 and the introduction of the Australian Bicentennial commemorative program that funds became available for the completion of the tower and spire. A grant of $1,000,000 was announced in that year by the Premier of New South Wales and the Diocese of Canberra and Goulburn agreed to provide additional funds.

=== Tower spire project ===
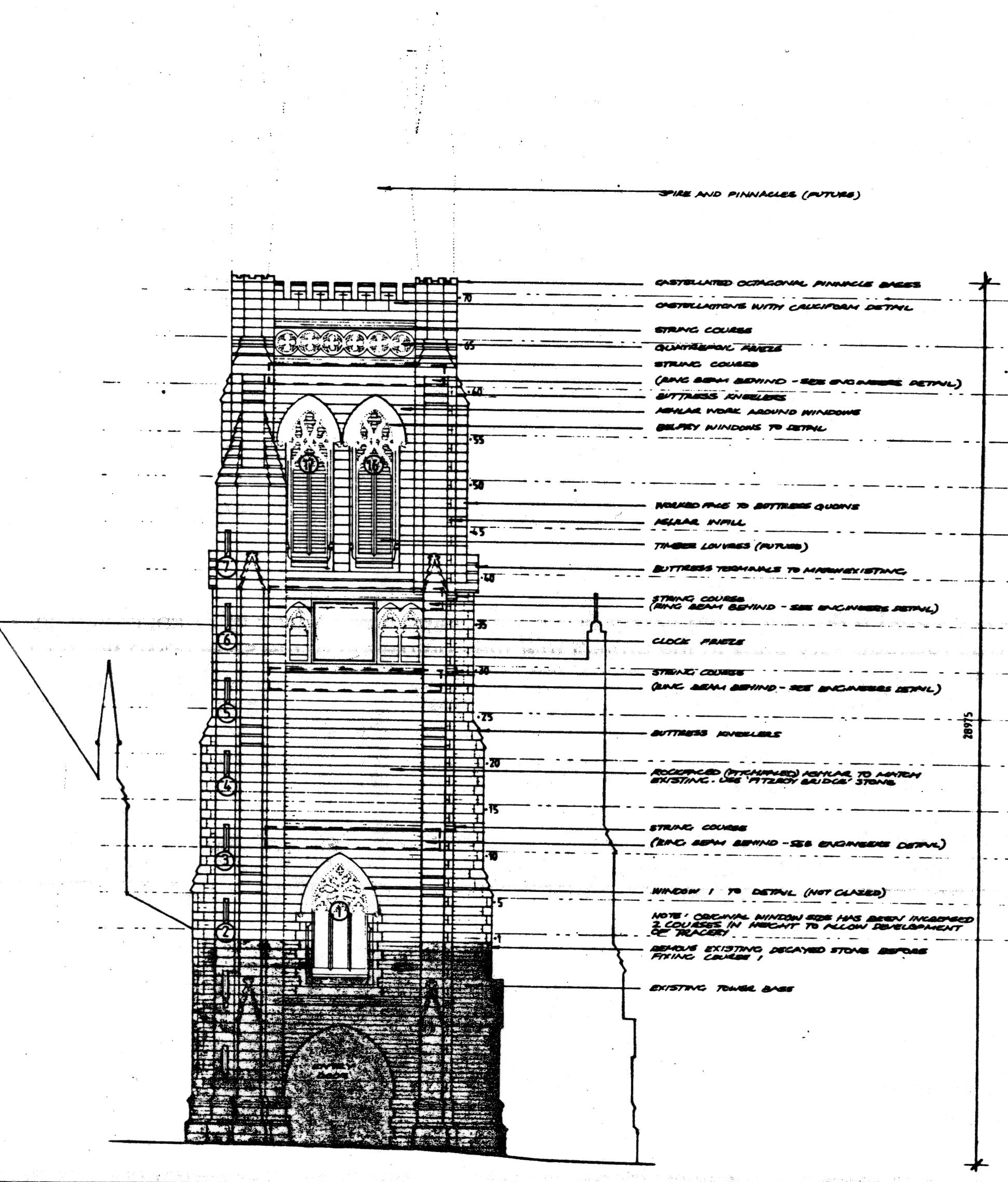
Architectural drawing Of the New Tower, Peter Freeman & Partners Pty Ltd 1986

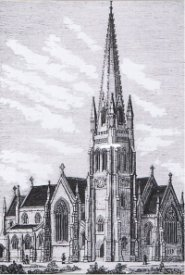
Artist impression of what the completed cathedral would look like

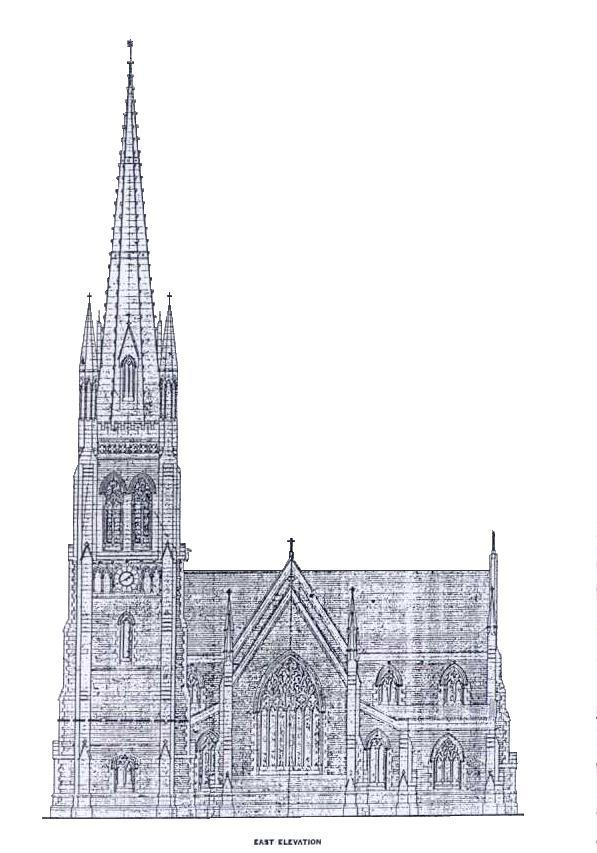
East elevation of the cathedral with spire

A series of tasks were early identified as critical to the project's success. The first task was the undertaking of a thorough geotechnical examination of the existing tower founding material. This investigation showed quite clearly that the existing footings to the tower were not adequate to carry the load of the intended tower and spire. Nine metre bore holes were drilled through the existing foundations and a footing/soil profile was established. This soil profile showed that beneath the sandstone and lime concrete footings was a 1.5 to 2.0 metre band of sandy clay, and weathered sandstone, which was judged inadequate to carry the tower loads, particularly under the stress of wind and seismic loading.

As a result of this study, engineering documentation was prepared for the underpinning of the existing tower. This work involved the excavation of the interior of the tower base to a depth of 8.5 metres. For this excavation, "drives" were taken out diagonally under each buttress for a length of four metres. These drives were then excavated clean and a reinforced concrete structure poured into the drive. The drive was then sealed and an adjacent area excavated. This process was continued until the tower walls were underpinned. This underpinning work was made more complex by the requirement to preserve intact the grave of Bishop Chalmers, directly to the east of the tower wall. At the completion of underpinning, the tower core was filled with mass concrete. During the excavation preparatory to the underpinning work, considerable ground water was also encountered at the cathedral sub-floor level. This ground water had followed the underlying rock strata and pooled at the cathedral east end and tower walls. Drainage of this sub-floor water is part of the associated cathedral conservation project.

A second task faced by the project team was the preparation of adequate "base" drawings for the tower project, and for the related conservation project that was to proceed simultaneously with the tower. Fortunately, the team was aided in this work by the Australian Survey Office, who undertook the photo grammetrical survey of the entire cathedral. Base plans had also to be produced of every stone course within the proposed building, to allow an early understanding of stone sizes and quantities.

A third task was the investigation of suitable stone types and sources for the proposed building. The demolished remains of a local stone bridge, the Fitzroy Bridge, which once spanned the Wollondilly River east of Goulburn were available. This stone, though plentiful in quantity and though from the same quarry source, was not adequate in quantity or dimension to fulfil the requirements for the proposed tower and spire. A search for the original quarry was begun and it was eventually found just east of a small town called Marulan, some 30 kilometres east of Goulburn. The quarry, which had not been disturbed for almost a hundred years, was an archaeological site, but not suited to the extraction of stone in the quantities required by the project. The costs of re-opening the quarry were outside the resources of the project. Other sources were investigated and eventually an operational quarry north of Sydney was selected for the supply of stone to the project. This quarry, Central Coast Quarries, had the ability to provide the quantities of stone work required as well as the capacity to produce profiled stone. The Fitzroy Bridge stone was used for the "rock faced: body work, being appropriately sized for that use. When the project commenced other sources became known, particularly another source of (original) Marulan stone left unused at another Goulburn church.

The final task of this first, investigative phase was for the consultant team to visit other bell towers and spires within Australia. Only one other "completion" project of similar size and philosophical intent has been completed in Australia. That project, at Bendigo in Victoria, was visited by the consultant team and considerable data was exchanged with that project's architects.

On 1 August 1986 the stonemasons commenced work at the Goulburn site. The team had been assembled from Goulburn and environs, which had a rich and continuing tradition of stonemasonry work. The project manager and a specialist setter-out draughtsman were brought out from England to assist the project as no similar expertise existed within Australia.

Initially, the stonemasons were engaged in preparing the Fitzroy Bridge stone for the rock faced work. The setter-out draughtsman commenced the preparation of stone "shop drawings" for use by the masons. Working from a 1:100 scale plans and elevations, the draughtsman prepared drawings scheduling every stone in the building. Full-size drawings were then prepared of architectural elements, such as windows, string course, profiles and friezes. From these full-size drawings profiles for all stones were prepared as well as isometric drawings for each "special" stone were made available to the stonemasons. With the profile and isometric shop drawings, the masons prepared the worked stone for the project.

Parallel with this activity, engineering drawings were prepared for the concrete structure within the tower. This structure was required to stabilise the tower upper structure and support the thirteen bell bell-peal to be hung on the tower. Considerable work was done on the likely loadings imposed by the large bell peal and the concrete internal frame adopted as a result.

On 1 August 1986, the stonemasons commenced work at the Goulburn site. The team had been assembled from Goulburn and environs, which had a rich and continuing tradition of stonemasonry work. The project manager and a specialist setter-out draughtsman were brought out from England to assist the project as no similar expertise existed within Australia.

Building commenced in February 1987. The first work was to remove the existing Church of Saint Saviour's tenor bell, the existing (temporary) roof, and the weathered render to the top of the wall. During this work, the 1909 commemoration stone was discovered. It has always been a tenet of the consultant's work on the project that their building would resemble Edmund Blacket's original design as closely as possible. In accordance with this principal, it was decided very early that the tower/spire would be a mass masonry structure, with the concrete substructure introduced only as demanded by seismic and bell ringing loads. The mass structure employed was of face sandstone with 'through' stones as required, with a mass brickwork backing making up the rest of the wall. This dry press brickwork was to be laid integrally with the stonework in garden bond.

The spire is yet to be completed.

== Modifications and dates ==
- 1893: Reredos added
- c. 1900: Rood screen, later removed at an unknown date
- 1903: Bishop Thomas Memorial Chapel
- 1903: Organ relocated
- 1916: Original high altar replaced by the larger Bishop Barlow memorial altar
- 1920: Installation of electric lighting to replace gas lighting
- 1922: Soldiers' Memorial Chapel installed
- 1980: Provision of Lady Chapel
- 1988: Tower constructed
- 1988–2006: Bells installed
- 1994: Nave altar installed by extending the chancel westwards
- 1999: Narthex modified to provide improved entry and welcoming space
- 1999: Ascension Chapel installed in the western gallery
- 2006: Organ completed to Blacket's original design
- not known: Heating

The spire remains an unfinished work.

== Description ==
The cathedral building is made of sandstone from a quarry at Marulan, except for the pillars which are of Pyrmont sandstone. The roof is natural slate. The cathedral is unmistakably a Blacket church, on a grand scale, with nave, aisles, transepts, chancel, porches and tower. It has large and elaborate stone traceried windows and an impressive interior with a heavily carved hammer beam roof, clustered columns and foliage capitals, elaborately moulded arcades and chancel arch, and a use of figurative roundels in the nave, transepts and chancel.

The stone carving of the medallions depicting the life of Jesus was the first professional commission for William Priestly MacIntosh in 1883, who had trained as a stone carver in Edinburgh before migrating to Australia and studying under Lucien Henry at the Sydney Mechanics School of Arts.

The main dimensions of St Saviour's Cathedral are:

- Internal length, east–west is 45.7m.
- Internal widths, Nave & aisles, north to south is 16.4m.
- Transepts, north to south is 29.2m, east to west is 16.4m.

The cathedral was reported to be in generally good repair as at 13 November 2008 except for some specific problems:

- The cathedral roof allows water entry.
- The reredos is separating from the eastern wall.
- There are some areas of sandstone deterioration: on the sanctuary wall to the south of the high altar and at the base of the font.
- Several of the stained glass windows require maintenance because of bowing.
- Some floor brickwork either side of the nave altar has subsided.

The parish hall, originally the pro-cathedral, opened 1875

The original stone portion of this building was the pro-cathedral and is the portion of the present hall nearest to Bourke Street. In 1913 a stone extension was constructed on the western side to enlarge the hall and in 1923 a brick toilet block was added, again on the western side. In 2008, also on the western side toilet doors and an awning were added and the kitchen was modified.The roof is tiled following the fires of 1925 and 1961.

The cathedral office, originally the diocesan registry, opened 1924. This is a single storey brick building in the south-west corner of the precinct.

Landscaping

The landscaping of the precinct consisting of the fencing of the property; gardens, trees and shrubs including the topping tree planted after completion of the tower in 1988; terracing and paving; garth wall in the north-west corner; the stone retaining wall in the vicinity of the western end of the cathedral; and the rock monument celebrating the centenary of the cathedral and accompanying tree planting on the Cathedral Green. Two Cedar of Lebanon trees planted by Dame Alice Chisolm. A garden and walkway on the south side of the cathedral established in 2007 as a memorial to Louise Fell.

== Bells ==
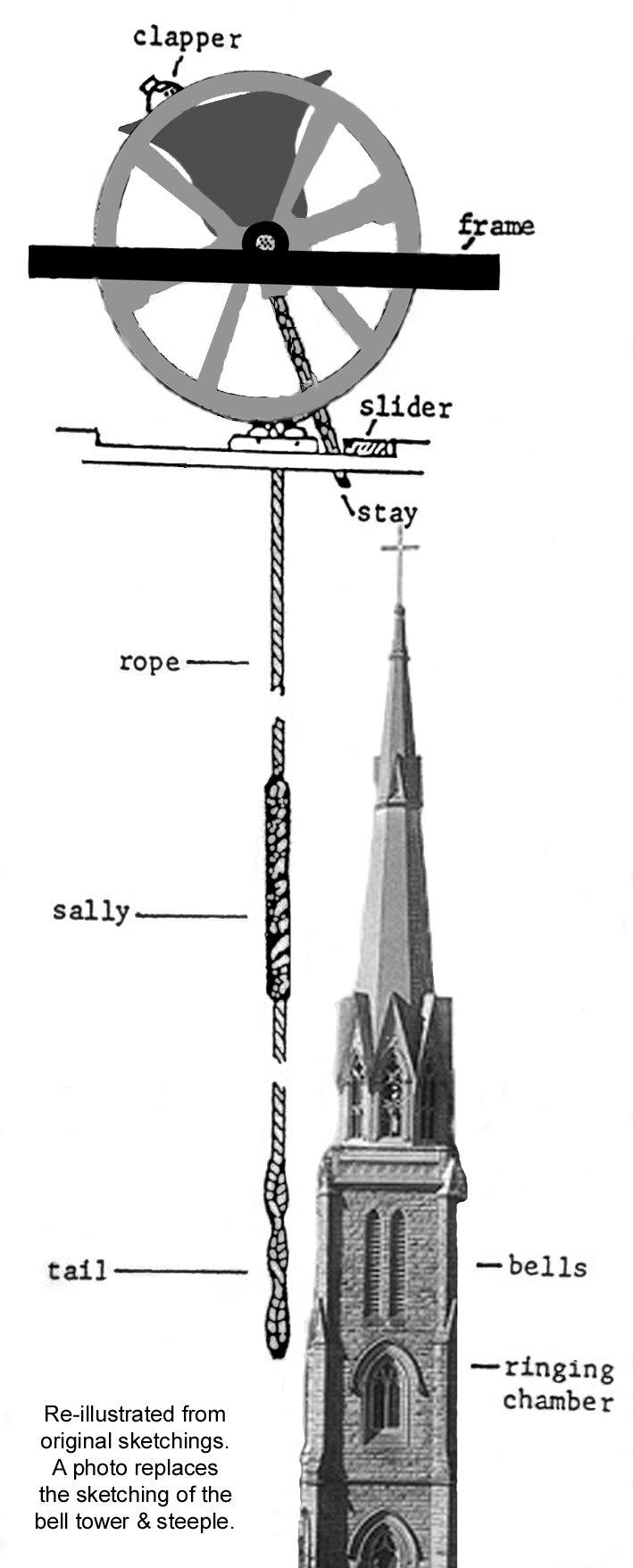
A diagram of the bells set up in the tower

St Saviour's has twelve bells. Eight of these were obtained from St Mark's Church in Leicester, England. They were restored at John Taylor Bell Foundry in Loughborough. The eight bells were "baptised", in the grounds of the cathedral, by the then Archbishop of Canterbury, Robert Runcie, and installed ready to ring by October 1988. The eight bells were named after the ships of the First Fleet. In increasing order of size, they are: Supply, Friendship, Lady Penrhyn, Prince of Wales, Charlotte, Scarborough, Alexander and the Tenor bell Sirius, which is the largest bell at 21 long hundredweight (1,100 kg).

In 1985 a grant was received from the Bicentennial Authority to enable the completion of the tower and spire and to install the rest of the bells which were included in Blacket's original 1871 design. In 1993 two more bells, Golden Grove and Fishburn were added to the top of the bell ring to give the cathedral a ring of ten bells. The final two trebles, Endeavour and Borrowdale, were added in May 2005, thus completing the peal of twelve bells.

Ringing tower bells requires training for several months. The bells swing through a full 360° so that they can be rung in a specific order. The ringer must control the swing of the bell so that they ring in the correct place. Bellringers do not ring by a musical score but by numbers. Special sequences can be rung so that every combination of the bells are rung.

The Service Bell is named Mesac, after the first bishop. It is the fourteenth bell in the tower but is not part of the full circle peal. The Mesac Bell is the original bell out of the St Saviour's Church and was created at the Whitechapel Bell Foundry. St Saviour's belltower is the only regional tower in the Southern Hemisphere to boast a peal of 12+1 bells, attracting many national and international ringers to the tower.

Number	Name	Year Cast	Weight		Namesake
Number	Name	Year Cast	kg	cwt	Namesake
Treble	Borrowdale	2004	244	4.81	HMS Borrowdale
2nd	Endeavour	2003	237	4.66	HMS Endeavour
3rd	Golden Grove	1993	257	5.05	HMS Golden Grove
4th	Fishburn	1993	277	5.45	HMS Fishburn
5th	Supply	1987	307	6.04	HMS Supply
6th	Friendship	1872	307	6.04	HMS Friendship
6th flat	Arthur Phillip	2005	377	7.42	Arthur Phillip
7th	Lady Penrhyn	1872	404	7.96	HMS Lady Penrhyn
8th	Prince of Wales	1872	424	8.34	HMS Prince of Wales
9th	Charlotte	1872	550	10.82	HMS Charlotte
10th	Scarborough	1872	589	11.60	HMS Scarborough
11th	Alexander	1872	809	15.92	AMS Alexander
Tenor	Sirius	1872	1,106	21.78	HMS Sirius

== Organ ==
The organ was built in 1884 by Forster and Andrews of Hull and was originally placed in the west gallery. In 1902 the organ was moved from the gallery to its present position in the chancel end of the south aisle, where it was reconfigured and provided with tubular-pneumatic action. Restored in 1978–79 by Brown and Arkley, the action was changed to electro-pneumatic. The organ has 3 manuals and 37 speaking stops.

== Heritage listing ==
Commenced in 1874 and finally dedicated in 1884, St Saviour's Cathedral is of state significance because it is considered as one of the finest designs by the colonial ecclesiastical architect Edmund Thomas Blacket. It reflects the characteristics of a Victorian Gothic style church in its materials, design and details. Blacket also designed the parish hall adjacent to the cathedral which was used as the pro-cathedral before the new cathedral was finished. The cathedral has a grand scale with nave, aisles, transepts, chancel, porches and tower; large and elaborate stone traceried windows and an interior with a heavily carved hammer beam roof, clustered columns and foliage capitals, elaborately moulded arcades and chancel arch, and a use of figurative roundels in the nave, transepts and chancel. The tower was not completed until 1988/9.

The cathedral site is the place from which the Anglican Diocese of Goulburn developed. It also provides physical evidence of the growth and importance of Goulburn as a regional centre in the latter half of the 19th century. The building has social and spiritual significance for both Anglicans and the broader community as a place of worship. It is the centre of the diocese; it draws visitors for its aesthetic value and for the significant cultural collection associated with the cathedral.

The cathedral's moveable collection shows a high degree of consistency between the design of the building and its contents. Two unique features are a pulpit crucifix carved by Blacket in 1842 and, within Australia, the 14 MacIntosh medallions depicting the life of Christ. The cathedral provides a tangible connection with the Community of the Ascension, the first religious order for men in Australia, through the relocation to the cathedral precinct of a number of items associated with the members. The cathedral's twelve bells give it the distinction of being the only regional tower in the Southern Hemisphere with such a peal and the thirteenth bell, the Flat 6th, allows for special ringing effects.

St Saviour's Cathedral was listed on the New South Wales State Heritage Register on 20 April 2009 having satisfied the following criteria.

The place is important in demonstrating the course, or pattern, of cultural or natural history in New South Wales.

St Saviour's Cathedral is historically significant for the important role it played in the growth and consolidation of the Anglican Church in southern New South Wales. It provides physical evidence of Goulburn as a major ecclesiastical centre in the latter half of the 19th century and the emergence of Goulburn as the main commercial and administrative centre in the region. The cathedral precinct is historically important as the place from which the Diocese of Goulburn developed. The diocese originally comprised 1/3 of New South Wales until divided with the Riverina diocese in 1884. When the new cathedral was opened in 1884 it continued to be the spiritual and administrative centre of a very large diocese. Although the bishop relocated his residence and the diocesan registry to Canberra in 1950, the cathedral building has remained in use as the Canberra-Goulburn diocese's cathedral.

The place has a strong or special association with a person, or group of persons, of importance of cultural or natural history of New South Wales's history.

The cathedral was designed by the influential colonial ecclesiastical architect Edmund Thomas Blacket who dominated ecclesiastical architecture in New South Wales for forty years. Blacket was associated with the place as early as 1843 when he designed the pulpit for the Old St Saviour's Church at a request from Bishop William Broughton. He also designed the parish hall (originally the pro-cathedral which opened in 1875). Blacket died in 1883 and the cathedral was completed by his sons, Cyril and Arthur, both of whom continued the Blacket architectural practice.

The cathedral is also associated with the early career of Edmund Cooper Manfred who acted as Blacket's site representative and later went on to be a notable architect in Goulburn. From 1880 to 1914, Manfred designed a large number of houses, ecclesiastical buildings, shops, hotels, the town hall, the hospital and the first swimming pool. His work clearly shows the architectural influence of Blacket.

Notable people with an association with the cathedral and included in the Australian Dictionary of Biography. are clergy such as Dean William Sowerby, Bishop Mesac Thomas, Bishop E. H. Burgmann and landowners such as Campbell, Gibson and Faithfull.

The place is important in demonstrating aesthetic characteristics and/or a high degree of creative or technical achievement in New South Wales.

St Saviour's Cathedral exemplifies the characteristics of a Victorian Gothic style church in its use of materials, design and detail. The cathedral is one of Edmund Blacket's most notable works. The building has a grand scale, with nave, aisles, transepts, chancel, porches and tower; large and elaborate stone traceried windows and an interior with a heavily carved hammer beam roof, clustered columns and foliage capitals, elaborately moulded arcades and chancel arch and a use of figurative roundels in the nave, transepts and chancel. The cathedral is a landmark building in Goulburn, strategically located to be viewed along the axis of Montague street from Auburn Street (Old Hume Highway) and along Bourke Street. It also has a strong architectural dialogue with the Roman Catholic cathedral of Saint's Peter and Paul further along Bourke Street.

The place has a strong or special association with a particular community or cultural group in New South Wales for social, cultural or spiritual reasons.

The cathedral plays an important role as a central place of worship and prayer for the Anglican congregation of the Diocese of Canberra and Goulburn. The cathedral attracts around 6,000 visitors per year as a place of worship, its architectural value, its culturally significant moveable collection and for its concerts and exhibitions. It plays an important role in the annual Goulburn Mulwaree Festival of Heritage and Roses (incorporating Cathedral Week) and is used in tourism promotion of the town.

The place has potential to yield information that will contribute to an understanding of the cultural or natural history of New South Wales.

The burials on the site have the potential to reveal information about persons associated with the cathedral.

The place is important in demonstrating the principal characteristics of a class of cultural or natural places/environments in New South Wales.

The cathedral is a notable example of the work of the influential colonial ecclesiastical architect Edmund Thomas Blacket. It is considered a fine example of a Victorian Gothic sandstone cathedral.

== Deans and bishops ==
=== Deans of Goulburn ===
The following individuals have served as Deans of Goulburn:

Ordinal	Name	Term start	Term end	Notes
1	William Sowerby	1863	1875	
2	William Henry Pownell	1891	1895	
-	post vacant	c. 1908	1947	
3	Arnold Collingwood King	1947	1966	
4	Ronald Earl Moon	1986	1992	
5	Godfrey Charles Fryar	1993	1998	Later the Bishop of Rockhampton, 2003.
6	Kenyon Vincent McKie	1999	2004	
7	Phillip Noel Saunders	2004	2022	
8	Gavin Andreas Krebs	2024	incumbent	

=== Incumbents of St Saviour's ===
The following individuals have served as incumbents at St Saviour's:

Ordinal	Name	Term start	Term end	Notes
1	William Sowerby	1838	1875	
2	Alfred Teed Puddicombe	1876	1896	
3	William Charles Pritchard	1896	1901	
4	William Martin	1901	1903	
5	Arthur Robert Bartlett	1903	1913	
6	George Albert Carver	1914	1921	
7	John William Ward	1921	1927	
8	Arthur Philip Wales	1927	1932	
9	Gordon Hamilton Hirst	1932	1937	
10	Kenneth Lesley McKeown	1937	1941	
11	Arnold Collingwood King	1941	1966	
12	Harold Ernest Palmer	1967	1981	
13	Lyall Alexander Turley	1981	1985	
14	Ronald Earl Moon	1986	1992	
15	Godfrey Charles Fryar	1993	1998	
16	Kenyon Vincent McKie	1999	2004	
17	Phillip Noel Saunders	2004	2022	
17	Gavin Andreas Krebs	2024	incumbent	

== See also ==
- List of Anglican churches in the Diocese of Sydney
- List of Edmund Blacket buildings
- List of cathedrals in Australia
