= North Scarle =

Village and civil parish in the North Kesteven district of Lincolnshire, England

Coordinates: 53.193520°N 0.729669°W

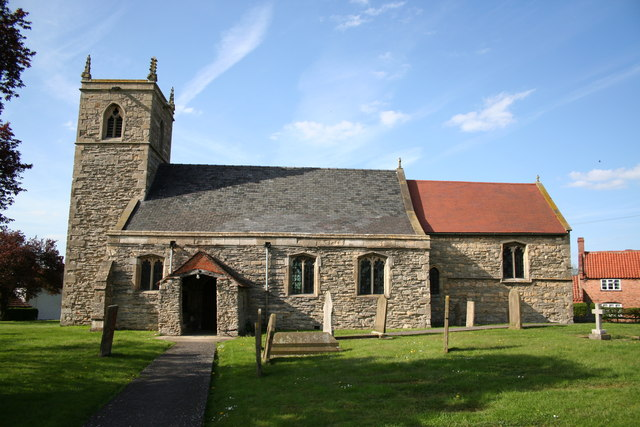
- All Saints' Church, North Scarle

- Location within Lincolnshire
- Population: 640 (2011)
- OS grid reference: SK849670
  - London: 120 mi (190 km) S
- District: North Kesteven
- Shire county: Lincolnshire
- Region: East Midlands
- Country: England
- Sovereign state: United Kingdom
- Post town: Lincoln
- Postcode district: LN6
- Police: Lincolnshire
- Fire: Lincolnshire
- Ambulance: East Midlands
- UK Parliament: Sleaford and North Hykeham

North Scarle is a village and civil parish in the North Kesteven district of Lincolnshire, England. The population of the civil parish at the 2011 census was 640. The village is situated close to the River Trent, about 8 miles (13 km) south-west from the city and county town of Lincoln, and on the county boundary with Nottinghamshire.

The parish church is dedicated to All Saints and is a Grade I listed building dating from the 12th century, although it was destroyed by fire in 1342 and rebuilt directly after. In 1898 it was extensively restored and a north aisle was built by Sir Ninian Comper.

The 19th-century clergyman and Australian police commander Henry Inman was rector of All Saints for 36 years and is interred in the churchyard.

Village amenities include a village hall, post office, heritage centre, The White Hart public house, a Methodist hall, a sports and social club and playing fields, and a Primary School. There is also a miniature railway.
