= Royal Admiral (1828 ship) =

History

United Kingdom
- Name: Royal Admiral
- Owner: William Bottomly
- Builder: William Bottomly, King's Lynn
- Launched: 26 May 1828
- Fate: Wrecked 1844

General characteristics
- Tons burthen: 414 (bm)
- Length: 113 ft 4 in (34.5 m)
- Beam: 28 ft 7 in (8.7 m)
- Propulsion: Sail

Royal Admiral was a 414-ton timber three-masted barque, built at King's Lynn, England in 1828 and used as a merchant ship. Royal Admiral first served for trade to India. She subsequently sailed to Australia on four occasions carrying convicts, from Portsmouth to Port Jackson in 1830, from Dublin to Port Jackson in 1833 and 1834, and from Woolwich to Hobart Town in 1842, as well as several emigrant and cargo voyages.

== Career ==
On her first convict voyage, under the command of David Fotheringham and surgeon S. Rutherford, she departed Portsmouth on 5 July 1830 and arrived in Sydney on 8 November 1830. She had embarked 193 male convicts; there were four convict deaths en route.

For her second convict voyage, under the command of David Fotheringham and surgeon Andrew Henderson, Royal Admiral departed Dublin, Ireland on 4 or 5 June 1833, and arrived in Sydney on 26 October. She had embarked 220 male convicts, five of whom died en route.

On her third convict voyage, under the command of David Fotheringham and surgeon J. Osborne, Royal Admiral departed Dublin on 27 September 1834 and arrived in Sydney on 22 January 1835. She had embarked 203 male convict and had two convict deaths en route.

Royal Admiral also sailed from Falmouth, Cornwall on 26 September 1837 with 112 pioneering settlers bound for Port Adelaide, South Australia, arriving 18 January 1838. A notable passenger on this voyage was Henry Inman who was to become the founding commander of the South Australian Police Force.

She returned to Sydney on 27 September 1839 with 220 free emigrants and 8 passengers who had left Liverpool on 2 May 1839 and Rio on 7 July 1839. She left Sydney for London with general cargo and 20 passengers on 10 January 1840. By the end of that year, she was back in Port Adelaide with cargo and passengers including 142 emigrants in steerage.

On her fourth convict voyage Royal Admiral, William T. Fell, master, sailed from London on 7 May 1842. She sailed via the Cape and arrived at Hobart on 24 September. She had embarked 204 female convicts and suffered two convict deaths on the voyage.

== Fate ==
Royal Admiral was wrecked on the coast of India on 26 July 1844. She was under the command of Captain Garbutt, and sailing from Newport to Aden, when she wrecked upon the Prong, near Colaba light-house. Materials were saved, but ship and cargo were lost. The 1844 volume of Lloyd's Register shows her master as G. Weakner, her owner as Bottomly, and her trade Newport—Aden. The entry has the notations "Wrecked" against her name.
