= Charles Bullock (rector) =

British ecclesiastical rector and author

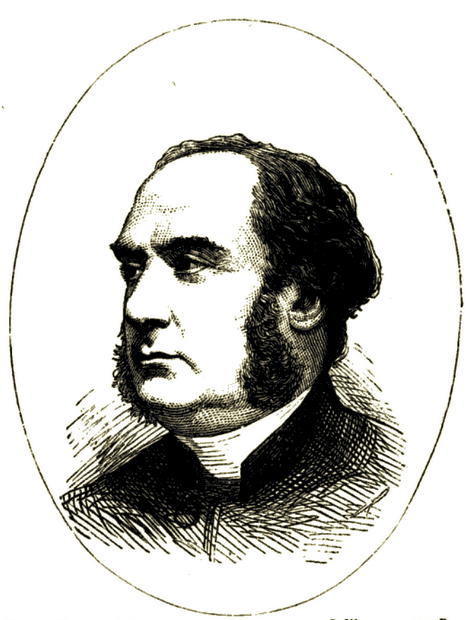
Charles Bullock (1879)

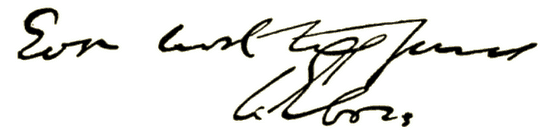
Signature

Rev. Charles Bullock, B.D., (24 February 1829 – 23 September 1911) was a British ecclesiastical rector and author. He was also the founder and editor of popular religious magazines.

== Early life and education ==
Charles Bullock was born in 1829.

He was educated at St Bees Theological College, Cumberland.

== Career ==
=== Clergyman ===
He was ordained in 1855 to the curacy of Rotherham, South Yorkshire. He removed, in 1856, to Ripley, North Yorkshire, near Harrogate, and afterwards held the sole charge of Christ Church, Luton, in Bedfordshire. In 1859, he became curate of St. Nicholas', Worcester, of which parish the Canon William Henry Havergal was rector; and on his retirement, in 1860, Bishop Henry Pepys appointed Bullock as his successor. He held this post for fourteen years, during which period, the old church was restored, at a cost of more than £3,000, and a rectory house built.

In 1874, he removed to Blackheath, in order to devote himself to writing. In recognition of his services in this direction, the Archbishop of Canterbury conferred on him the degree of B.D.

An Evangelical Anglican, Bullock started the "Robin Dinners" for poor children at Christmas.

=== Author and editor ===
The magazines edited by Bullock were The Fireside (first published in 1864), Home Words, which in its localized form was known throughout the country, and The Day of Days, for Sunday reading. In 1876, he founded Hand and Heart, as a penny illustrated Church of England newspaper; its title later changed to The Church Standard, as more in keeping with its distinctive features. Hand and Heart became a monthly social and temperance paper.

Bullock was the author of many widely read religious books including, The Way Home; or, the Gospel in the Parable, which was translated into Norwegian; England's Royal Home; The Home Life of the Prince Consort; Doubly Royal; What Church? or, The Only Faith and Fold; Words of Ministry; The Best Wish; Earthly Stories with Heavenly Meanings; The Syrian Leper; The Parents' Gift: a Help to Early Prayer and Praise; Heart Cheer for Home Sorrow; The Forgotten Truth; Hugh Stowell: a Life and its Lessons; The Sunday-School Gift; What do we owe Him?; Can Nothing be Done?; Within the Palace Gates; and Robin's Carol, and what came of it.

== Death ==
Charles Bullock died 23 September 1911.
