= William Sowerby (cleric) =

English clergyman

William Sowerby (1799–1875) was an English cleric who served in Cumberland before moving to New South Wales, Australia. He was the first Anglican priest at Goulburn and took a keen interest in the education, health and social welfare of the local population.

== Early career ==
William Sowerby was born on 31 August 1799 at Castle Sowerby near Penrith, Cumberland, England. He was the son of a farmer, William Sowerby. At the age of 16, after clerical tutelage, he became a school teacher and in 1823, he entered St Bees College to study for the ministry. William was ordained in 1826 becoming curate to St. Bridget Beckermet, Cumberland.

It is apparent that Sowerby had a close association with the emerging campaigner for better architectural education and professional status, William Wallen (1807-1888). In 1836, Wallen dedicated his book, The History and Antiquities of the Round Church at Little Maplestead, to the Rev. William Sowerby, “with sentiments of respect and esteem”.

== Career in Australia ==
Sowerby was one of the first to respond to an appeal by Bishop Broughton for clergy to serve in New South Wales. On 31 October 1837, William and his wife, Hannah (née Grayson), reached Sydney aboard the Andromache and became the first Anglican clergyman at Goulburn, including St Saviour's Cathedral, Goulburn. During the early 1840s, Sowerby kept a school for 'the sons of highly respectable families' and took a keen interest in the institutions of the growing town. He also ministered to the convict gangs at Towrang, attended executions and from 1852, he was chaplain at Goulburn Gaol. Nevertheless, he actively agitated against the transportation of convicts. Sowerby advocated for life assurance and was an agent and trustee of the Goulburn Savings Bank. For many years, he was the treasurer of the Goulburn District Hospital. He died from chronic diarrhea on 22 November 1875 at Goulburn and was buried in the Anglican cemetery.
